= USS Philadelphia (LPD-32) =

US Navy San Antonio-class amphibious transport dock

USS Philadelphia (LPD 32)
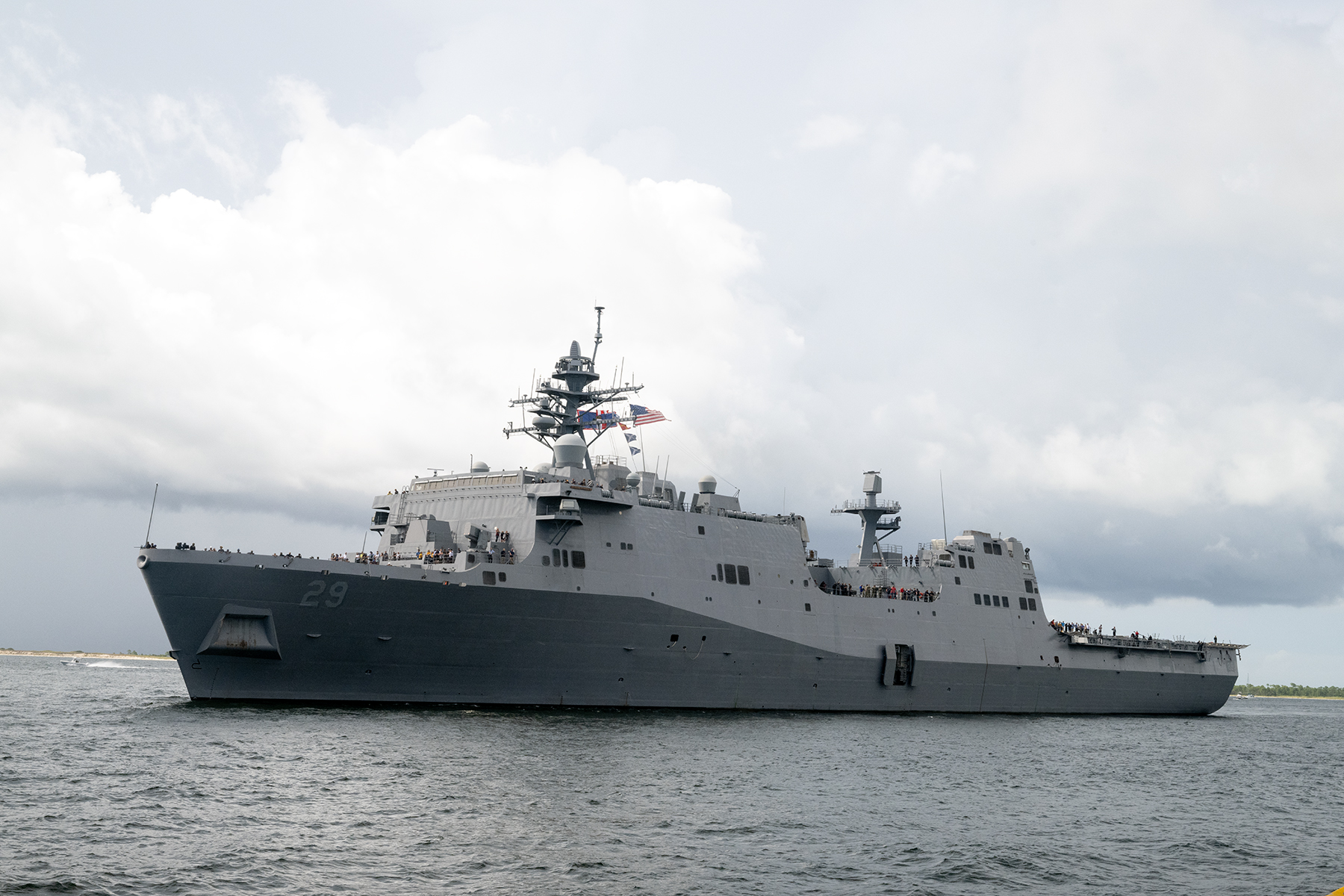
- Philadelphia's sister ship USS Richard M. McCool Jr.

History

United States
- Name: Philadelphia
- Namesake: Philadelphia
- Ordered: 31 March 2023
- Builder: Ingalls Shipbuilding
- Laid down: 3 March 2026
- Sponsored by: Maureen Paparo
- Identification: Hull number: LPD 32

General characteristics
- Class & type: San Antonio-class amphibious transport dock
- Displacement: 25,000 tons full
- Length: 208.5 m (684 ft) overall; 201.4 m (661 ft) waterline
- Beam: 31.9 m (105 ft) extreme; 29.5 m (97 ft) waterline
- Draft: 7 m (23 ft)
- Propulsion: Four Colt-Pielstick diesel engines, two shafts, 40,000 hp (30,000 kW)
- Speed: 22 knots (41 km/h; 25 mph)
- Boats & landing craft carried: 2 x LCACs (air cushion) or; 1 x LCU (conventional)
- Capacity: 699 (66 officers, 633 enlisted); surge to 800 total.
- Complement: 28 officers, 333 enlisted
- Armament: 2 x 30 mm Bushmaster II cannons, for surface threat defense; 2 x Rolling Airframe Missile launchers for air defense
- Aircraft carried: Two MV-22 tilt rotor aircraft may be launched or recovered simultaneously.

USS Philadelphia (LPD 32), will be a Flight II San Antonio-class amphibious transport dock for the United States Navy. She will be the seventh United States Navy vessel named for the city of Philadelphia. Secretary of the Navy Carlos Del Toro announced the ship's name while visiting Philadelphia's historic Independence Hall, during Navy and Marine Corps Week festivities in October 2023. Also announced was ship sponsor Maureen Paparo, wife of Admiral Samuel Paparo, 64th Commander of the U.S. Pacific Fleet.
