= USS Travis Manion =

US Navy San Antonio-class amphibious transport dock

USS Travis Manion (LPD 33)
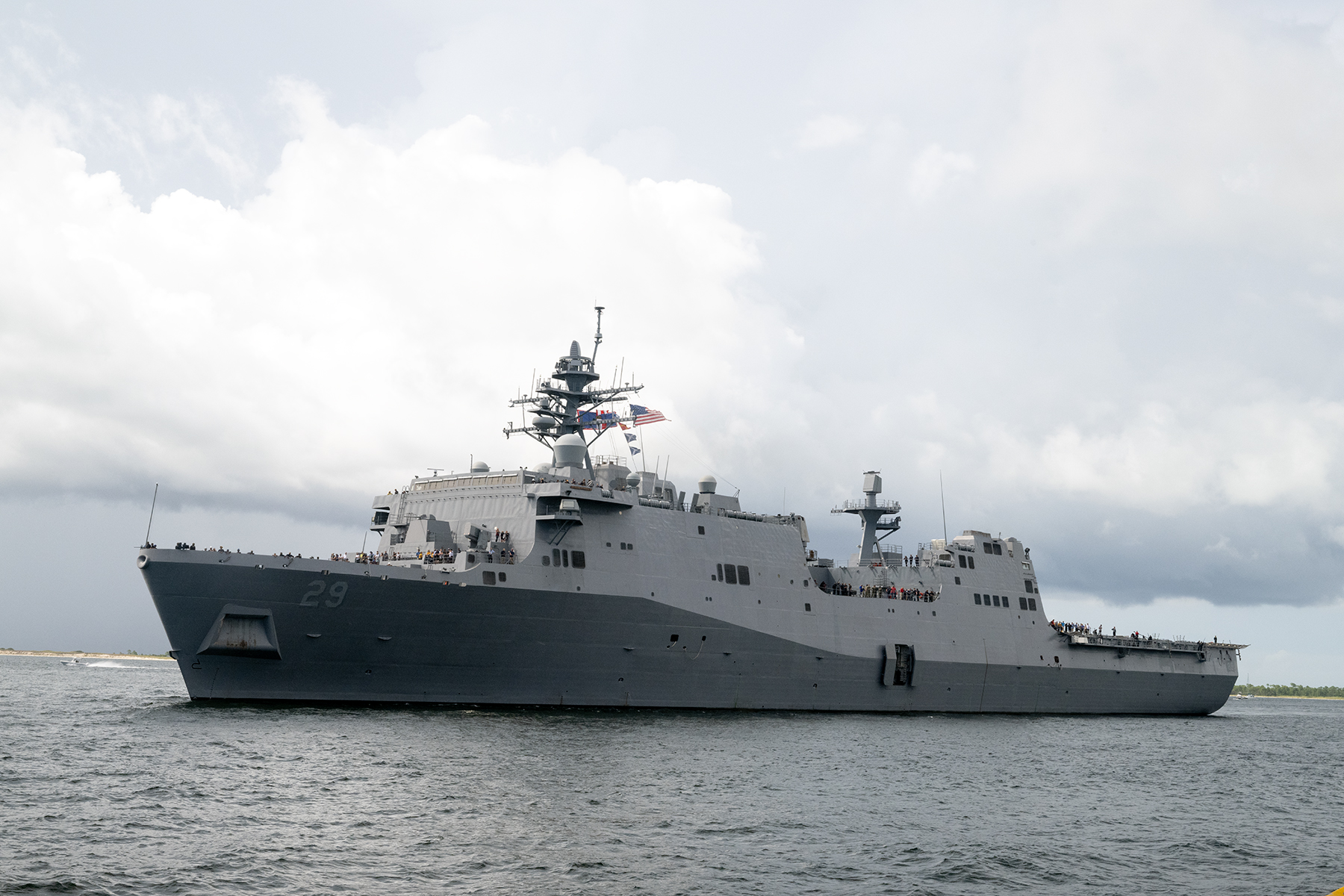
- Travis Manion's sister ship USS Richard M. McCool Jr.

History

United States
- Name: Travis Manion
- Namesake: Travis Manion
- Ordered: 24 September 2024
- Builder: Ingalls Shipbuilding
- Sponsored by: Ryan Manion
- Identification: Hull number: LPD 33

General characteristics
- Class & type: San Antonio-class amphibious transport dock
- Displacement: 25,000 tons full
- Length: 208.5 m (684 ft) overall; 201.4 m (661 ft) waterline
- Beam: 31.9 m (105 ft) extreme; 29.5 m (97 ft) waterline
- Draft: 7 m (23 ft)
- Propulsion: Four Colt-Pielstick diesel engines, two shafts, 40,000 hp (30,000 kW)
- Speed: 22 knots (41 km/h; 25 mph)
- Boats & landing craft carried: 2 x LCACs (air cushion) or; 1 x LCU (conventional)
- Capacity: 699 (66 officers, 633 enlisted); surge to 800 total.
- Complement: 28 officers, 333 enlisted
- Armament: 2 x 30 mm Bushmaster II cannons, for surface threat defense; 2 x Rolling Airframe Missile launchers for air defense
- Aircraft carried: Two MV-22 tilt rotor aircraft may be launched or recovered simultaneously.

USS Travis Manion (LPD 33) will be a Flight II San Antonio-class amphibious transport dock for the United States Navy. Secretary of the Navy Carlos Del Toro announced the ship's name during a ceremony with the Travis Manion Foundation in January 2025. Also announced was ship sponsor Ryan Manion, sister of 1st Lieutenant Travis Manion.
