= USS Pittsburgh =

Five ships of the United States Navy have been or will be named USS Pittsburgh in honor of Pittsburgh, Pennsylvania:

- USS Pittsburgh (1861) (alternately spelled Pittsburg) was an ironclad gunboat that served during the American Civil War.
- USS Pittsburgh (CA-4), originally named USS Pennsylvania (ACR-4), was an armored cruiser serving during World War I.
- USS Pittsburgh (CA-70), the original name of USS Canberra (CA-70), that was changed just before launch to honor the loss of HMAS Canberra (D33), which was lost during the Battle of Savo Island in the Pacific War.
- USS Pittsburgh (CA-72), originally named Albany, was a Baltimore-class cruiser that served during World War II, and notable for losing her bow in a typhoon, and yet surviving.
- USS Pittsburgh (SSN-720) was a Los Angeles-class submarine decommissioned in 2019.
- USS Pittsburgh (LPD-31) is a San Antonio-class amphibious transport dock, currently under construction.
