= USS Pittsburgh (LPD-31) =

US Navy San Antonio-class amphibious transport dock

USS Pittsburgh (LPD 31)
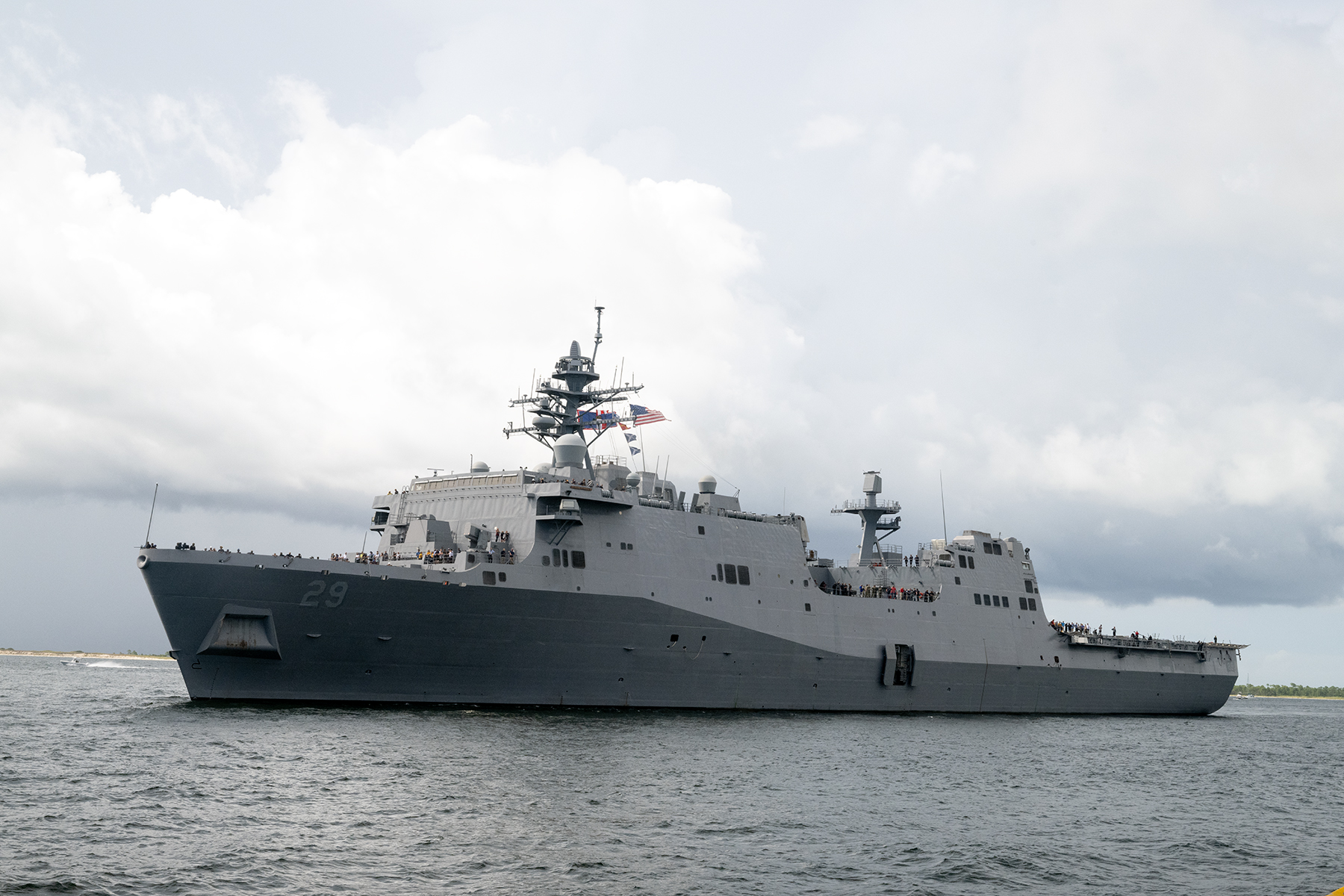
- Pittsburgh's sister ship USS Richard M. McCool Jr.

History

United States
- Name: Pittsburgh
- Namesake: Pittsburgh
- Ordered: 3 April 2020
- Builder: Ingalls Shipbuilding
- Laid down: 2 June 2023
- Identification: Hull number: LPD 31
- Status: Under construction

General characteristics
- Class & type: San Antonio-class amphibious transport dock
- Displacement: 25,000 tons full
- Length: 208.5 m (684 ft) overall; 201.4 m (661 ft) waterline
- Beam: 31.9 m (105 ft) extreme; 29.5 m (97 ft) waterline
- Draft: 7 m (23 ft)
- Propulsion: Four Colt-Pielstick diesel engines, two shafts, 40,000 hp (30,000 kW)
- Speed: 22 knots (41 km/h; 25 mph)
- Boats & landing craft carried: 2 x LCACs (air cushion) or; 1 x LCU (conventional)
- Capacity: 699 (66 officers, 633 enlisted); surge to 800 total.
- Complement: 28 officers, 333 enlisted
- Armament: 2 x 30 mm Bushmaster II cannons, for surface threat defense; 2 x Rolling Airframe Missile launchers for air defense
- Aircraft carried: Two MV-22 tilt rotor aircraft may be launched or recovered simultaneously.

USS Pittsburgh (LPD-31), a Flight II San Antonio-class amphibious transport dock for the United States Navy, will be the fifth United States Navy vessel named after Pittsburgh. Secretary of the Navy Kenneth Braithwaite officially announced multiple ship names, including Pittsburgh, during his visit to the oldest U.S. Navy commissioned ship afloat, USS Constitution, on 15 January 2021. Her keel was laid down 2 June 2023.
