= USS San Antonio =

San Antonio–class amphibious transport dock

USS San Antonio (LPD-17)
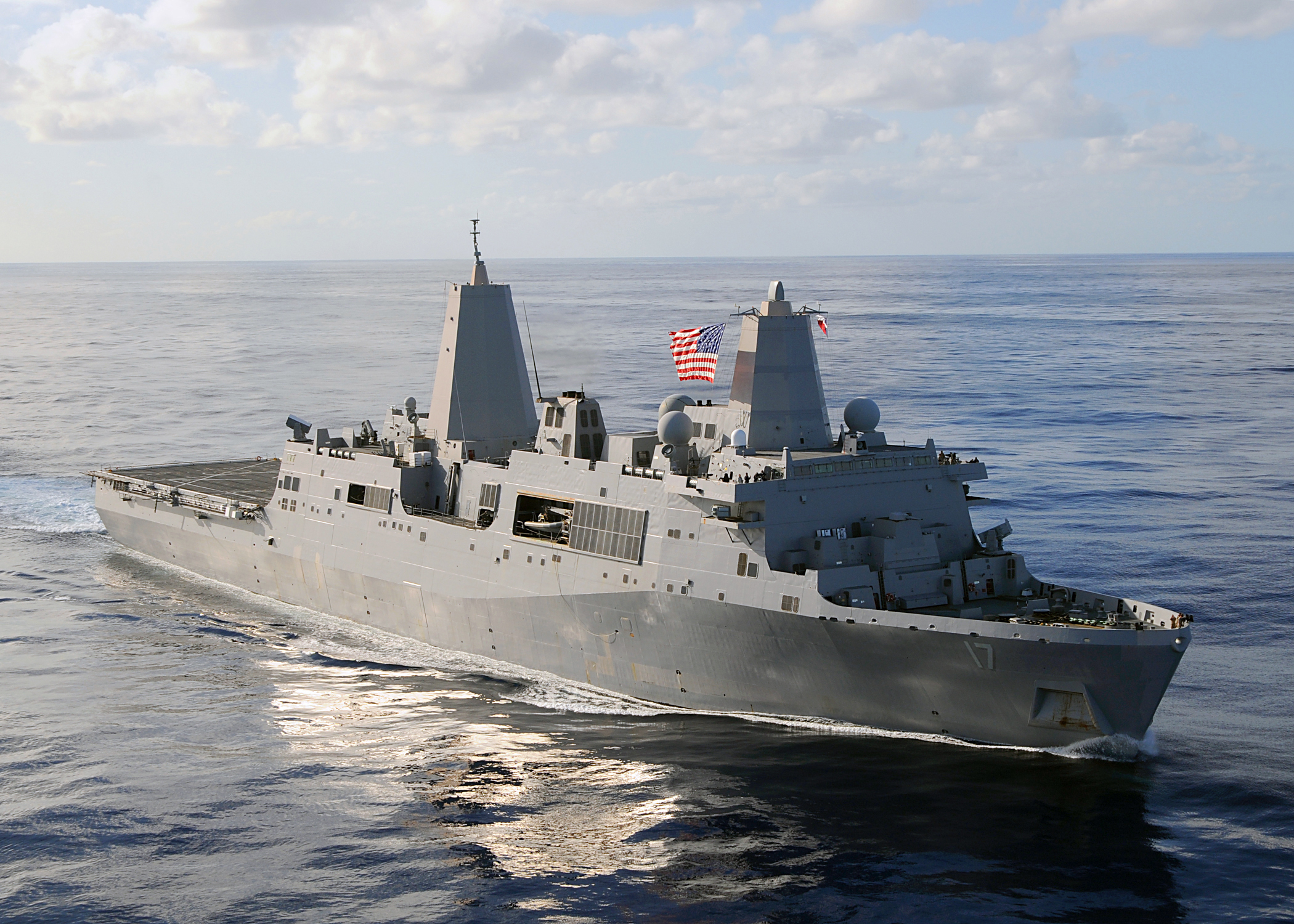
- USS San Antonio underway in the Atlantic Ocean in 2008

History

United States
- Name: San Antonio
- Namesake: San Antonio
- Awarded: 17 December 1996
- Builder: Northrop Grumman Ship Systems
- Laid down: 9 December 2000
- Launched: 12 July 2003
- Sponsored by: Sen. Kay Bailey Hutchison
- Commissioned: 14 January 2006
- Home port: Naval Station Norfolk
- Identification: MMSI number: 366997034; Callsign: NSAT; Pennant number: LPD-17
- Motto: Never Retreat, Never Surrender
- Status: in active service
- Notes: Program cost $18.6 billion; Unit cost $1.7 billion (FY 2011)
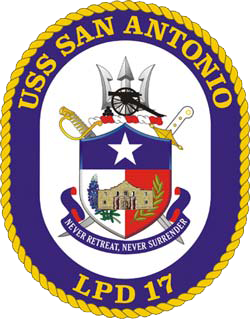
- Badge

General characteristics
- Class & type: San Antonio-class amphibious transport dock
- Displacement: 25,000 tons full
- Length: 684 ft 1 in (208.5 m) overall, 660 ft 9 in (201.4 m) waterline
- Beam: 104 ft 8 in (31.9 m) extreme, 96 ft 9 in (29.5 m) waterline
- Draft: 23 ft 0 in (7 m)
- Propulsion: Four Colt-Pielstick diesel engines, two shafts, 40,000 hp (30 MW)
- Speed: 22 knots (41 km/h)
- Boats & landing craft carried: Two LCACs (air cushion); OR; One LCU (conventional)
- Capacity: 699 (66 officers, 633 enlisted); surge to 800 total.
- Complement: 363 (28 officers, 335 enlisted)
- Electronic warfare & decoys: Radar: AN/SPS-48E, AN/SPQ-9B, AN/SPS-73.; EW: AN/SLQ-25A Nixie, AN/SLQ-32A(V)2, Mark 36 SRBOC, MK 53/Nulka.
- Armament: Two 30 mm MK46 cannons for surface threat defense; Two Rolling Airframe Missile launchers for air defense
- Aircraft carried: Four MH-60S Seahawk (Knighthawk) helicopters or two MV-22 tilt rotor aircraft may be launched or recovered simultaneously.

USS San Antonio (LPD-17), the lead ship of her class of amphibious transport dock or landing platform dock, is the first ship of the United States Navy to be named for the city of San Antonio, Texas.

== Construction ==
=== Design improvements ===
San Antonio is the first U.S. Navy vessel to incorporate new crew comfort features, including bunks with increased headroom, in-rack fans, and pull-out laptop computer shelves.

She is also the largest U.S. Navy vessel to incorporate stealth features, with close attention paid to exterior shaping. Shaping features include:

- Major antennas are mounted on platforms inside two Advanced Enclosed Mast/Sensor systems rather than on traditional mast yardarms that expose antennas to the environment.
- Deck edges are bounded by shaped bulwarks rather than lifeline stanchions. These bulwarks are hollow and double as storage lockers, eliminating locker clutter on decks.
- Exterior equipment is recessed or flush-mounted where possible, giving the ship a clean exterior appearance. Any equipment that cannot be flush-mounted (such as ladders) incorporate shaping features of their own.
- The boat-handling crane at the center of the ship folds into a clean shape when not in use.
- The anchor and anchor pocket are shaped to minimize radar backscatter.

=== Contract award and build ===
On 17 December 1996, the U.S. Navy awarded a contract to an industrial alliance led by Northrop Grumman Ship Systems (formerly Litton Avondale), with General Dynamics Bath Iron Works, Raytheon Electronic Systems, and Intergraph Corporation, to design and construct the first of an anticipated 12 ships under the Navy's LPD-17 program.

The keel was laid down on 9 December 2000. The ship was launched on 12 July 2003 and christened on 19 July by Senator Kay Bailey Hutchison of Texas. She was originally scheduled to be commissioned 17 July 2002, but was delayed by problems at the Avondale shipyard, which resulted in her being towed from New Orleans to the Northrop Grumman shipyard at Pascagoula, Mississippi, in December 2004 for completion.

The Navy took delivery three days before Hurricane Katrina hit in August 2005. Work was delayed further when the ship became a base for regional relief efforts, including accommodations for some shipyard workers, the National Guard, Navy diving and salvage personnel, and government officials. The ship's final cost was $840 million over budget.

=== Commissioning ===
She was finally commissioned 14 January 2006, at NS Ingleside, Texas. Guest speakers included former U.S. President George H. W. Bush. Senator Hutchison, the ship's sponsor, gave the crew the customary first command, "Man our ship, and bring her to life!" After commissioning she was sent to her home port of Norfolk, Virginia.

== Ship history ==
=== 2003 ===
San Antonio was built by Northrop Grumman Ship Systems in New Orleans, the 684-foot, 25,000-ton vessel was launched on 12 July 2003, and christened one week later. She had been scheduled to be commissioned on 17 July 2002 but was delayed by poor performance at the Avondale shipyard, which resulted in her being towed from New Orleans to the Northrop Grumman shipyard at Pascagoula, Mississippi, in December 2004 for completion. The ship was unable to move under her own power at that time, despite having been christened more than a year earlier.

=== 2009 ===
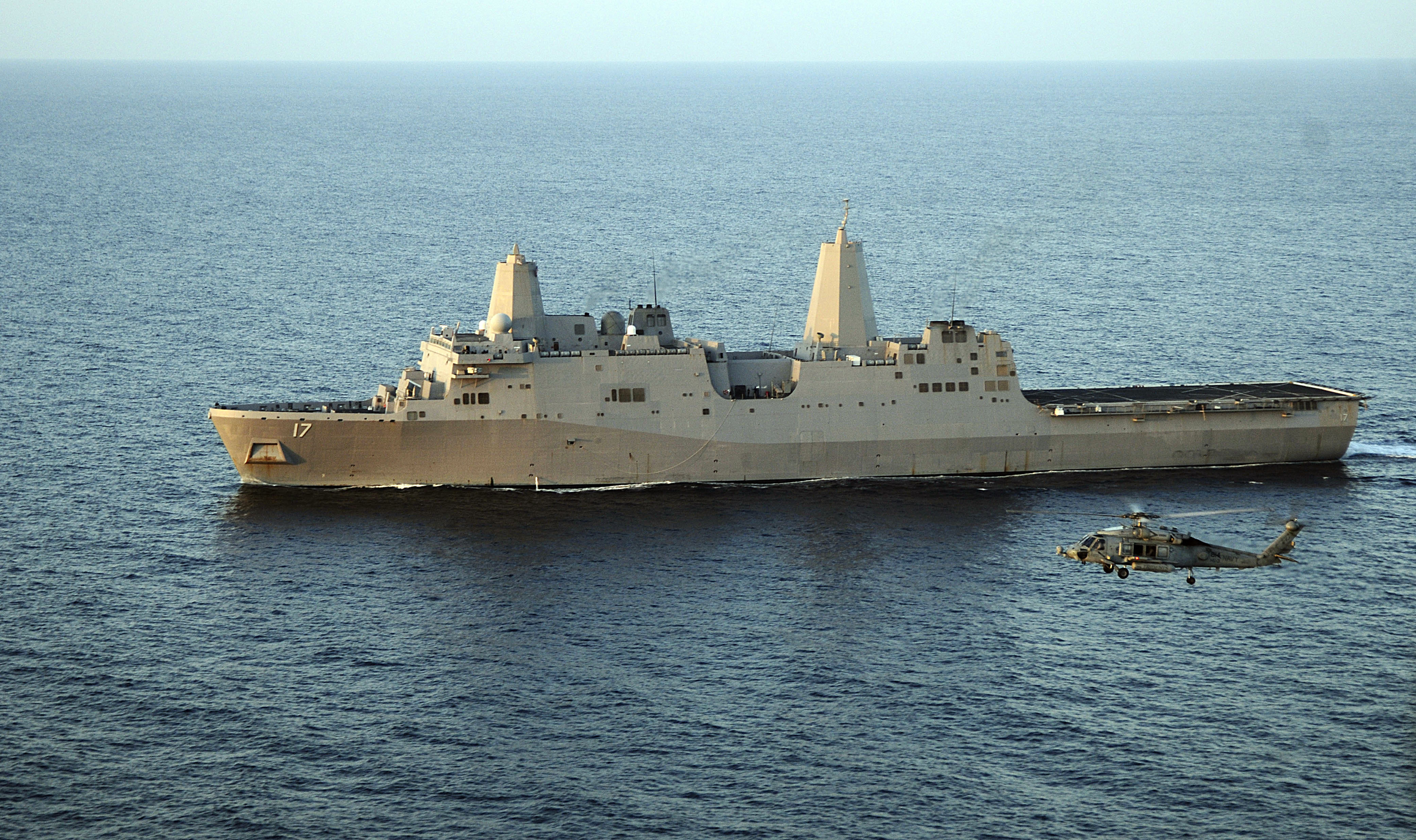
USS San Antonio as the CTF-151's flagship

In 2009, San Antonio served as a flagship for Combined Task Force 151, the multinational antipiracy naval force off Somalia. During the ship's time off Africa, the crew boarded 20 foreign vessels and discovered hidden explosives on one of them. The ship returned to Norfolk on 27 March 2009.

=== 2013 ===
In August 2013, the Navy confirmed that San Antonio had entered into the eastern Mediterranean Sea. They stressed it was a long-planned action and not related to the arrival of destroyers that had been stationed there due to the conflict in Syria. Officials thought it prudent to keep the ship near the destroyers, given the situation. In October 2013, Al Qaeda operative Abu Anas al-Libi was seized in Libya and then transferred to San Antonio to await transport to the United States for a trial and questioning.

=== 2016 ===
On 12 October 2016, San Antonio and the destroyer Mason were transiting through the southern end of the Red Sea when missiles were fired at them from Houthi-controlled territory in Yemen. Neither ship was harmed. In response to the attack on Mason and San Antonio, the destroyer Nitze launched five cruise missiles against three radar sites in Yemen that U.S. officials believe targeted the U.S. ships.

On 21 October, San Antonio deployed to the Mediterranean Sea as part of Operation Odyssey Lightning to replace amphibious assault ship Wasp, which was carrying out operations against ISIS. San Antonio carried UH-1 Y Hueys and AH-1 W Cobras from the 22nd Marine Expeditionary Unit's Aviation Combat Unit, VMM-264; Marine Harrier fighters were part of the operation aboard Wasp.

=== 2025 ===
San Antonio left Norfolk base on 1 August 2025 alongside her sister ship Fort Lauderdale, USS Iwo Jima, and two destroyers to the South Caribbean as a deployment for Operation Southern Spear.

== Criticism ==
Nearly three years after commissioning, problems persisted with this first-in-class vessel. On 27 January 2006, a contract worth over $6 million was awarded to Northrop Grumman, for the post-shakedown availability of San Antonio. Work was expected to be completed by April 2007. On 22 June 2007, Secretary of the Navy Donald C. Winter sent a letter to Northrop Grumman outlining problems with the ship, from leaks to steerage issues, stating, "Twenty-three months after commissioning of LPD-17, the Navy still does not have a mission-capable ship."

One week prior to deployment, refrigerated storage went down. Refrigerated units were craned onto the flight deck to store deployment provisions while repairs were conducted. On the day of deployment, the stern gate failed to function, causing a delay of two days.

In November 2008, two months into her maiden deployment, San Antonio had been forced to undergo an unplanned maintenance stop in Bahrain due to leaks in its lubricating oil piping system.

During a February 2009 transit of the Suez Canal, with both shafts at full power, one shaft suddenly went into reverse, sending the vessel careening out of control and narrowly missing other ships and running aground.

During an antipiracy mission in February 2009, a crewmember was killed in a small boat accident in the Gulf of Aden. The ship's captain, Commander Eric C. Cash, was reprimanded over the incident at an admiral's mast by Admiral J.C. Harvey Jr., the commander of Fleet Forces Command. The ship's executive officer refused a mast over the same incident and was court-martialed in October and November 2010. During the trial, his defense team presented evidence of the ship's numerous deficiencies and lack of written procedures as contributing to the accident. The executive officer was acquitted of the charges on 5 November 2010. He stated that the ship's officers had been pressured by the Navy to declare the ship ready to deploy, though they knew that she still had significant, unresolved problems.

In response to these problems, the Navy obtained approval to hire a sufficient number of supervisors of shipbuilding officers in 2009.

In October 2010, the Department of Defense (DoD) released a report outlining numerous engineering flaws in the San Antonio. A top aide in the DoD was quoted as saying that Northrop Grumman's ships are "not effective, suitable, and not survivable in combat". The report also blamed Raytheon, a subcontractor providing fiber optics, electrical, and antimissile systems for the San Antonio, for "persistent engineering deficiencies."

In April 2011 after nearly two years of constant repair work at various shipyards in Norfolk, Virginia, the Navy started an investigation into the constant mechanical and engineering issues with the San Antonio. The executive director of the regional maintenance command managing the work was relieved and transferred, as were the senior waterfront operations personnel. The Navy said that two contractors, Earl Industries, the prime contractor, and Fairbanks Morse, the engine manufacturer, were unwilling or unable to provide complete documentation into what was fixed on the ship and how. As a result, the Navy suspended Norfolk Ship Support Activity's oversight authority.

On 6 May 2011, the Navy canceled its maintenance contract with Earl Industries, citing, "improper work performed and concern regarding Earl Industries' quality assurance program and the company's ability to control the quality and documentation of work it performs."

On 26 May 2011, after ten days of sea trials, the ship's power plants were declared fit for duty. The ship completed the trials on 15 June 2011 and was scheduled for a short training deployment from July to August 2011. In July 2011, the San Antonio's diesel engine's intercoolers were found to be mechanically deficient after the ship failed to gain full power, causing the ship to return to be repaired. The repairs also found deficiencies in work performed by Earl Industries. The repairs were completed on 3 August 2011.

As of August 2011, the Navy said that all problems with the ship's engines have been corrected, including "foreign material exclusion plugs left in the drain piping system, use of incorrect material, and improper installation and sealing of gaskets".

== Awards ==
- 2012 Battle Effectiveness award.
- 2017 Combat Action Ribbon.

== Ship's coat of arms ==
The colors of the shield and star are adapted from the Texan state flag. The star also commemorates the "Lone Star" and first United States Navy ship to bear the name San Antonio. Red is the color for valor and sacrifice, blue is for loyalty, and white is for purity of purpose. The Alamo honors the men who were killed fighting for the independence of Texas from Mexico. The bluebonnets refer to the beauty and majesty of Texas and the olive branch highlights the ship's peacekeeping mission. The trident and cannon represent the old and new weaponry. The cannonballs and 19th-century cannon were similar to weapons used by the brave men who defended the Alamo. The trident, symbol of sea prowess, also represents the "mobility triad" for which USS San Antonio was built. The crossed Navy and Marine Corps swords represent co-operation and teamwork of the United States Navy and the United States Marine Corps.
