= USS Fort Lauderdale =

Amphibious transport dock ship

USS Fort Lauderdale (LPD-28)
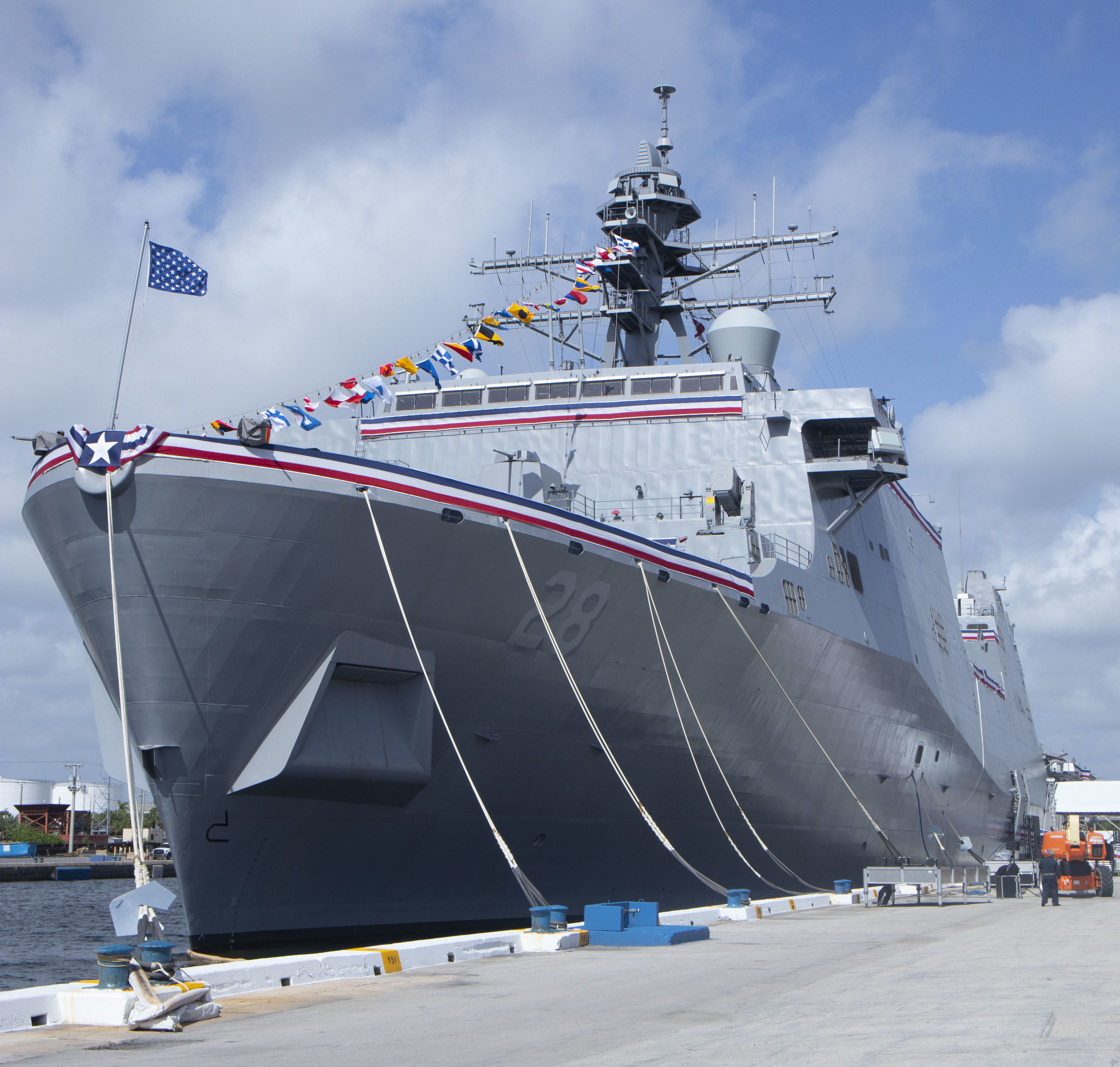
- USS Fort Lauderdale before her commissioning ceremony

History

United States
- Name: Fort Lauderdale
- Namesake: City of Fort Lauderdale
- Awarded: 19 December 2016
- Builder: Ingalls Shipbuilding
- Cost: US$1.793B (FY2016)
- Laid down: 13 October 2017
- Launched: 28 March 2020
- Sponsored by: Meredith Berger
- Christened: 21 August 2021
- Acquired: 11 March 2022
- Commissioned: 30 July 2022
- Home port: Norfolk
- Identification: Pennant number: LPD-28
- Motto: Together We Fight
- Status: in active service
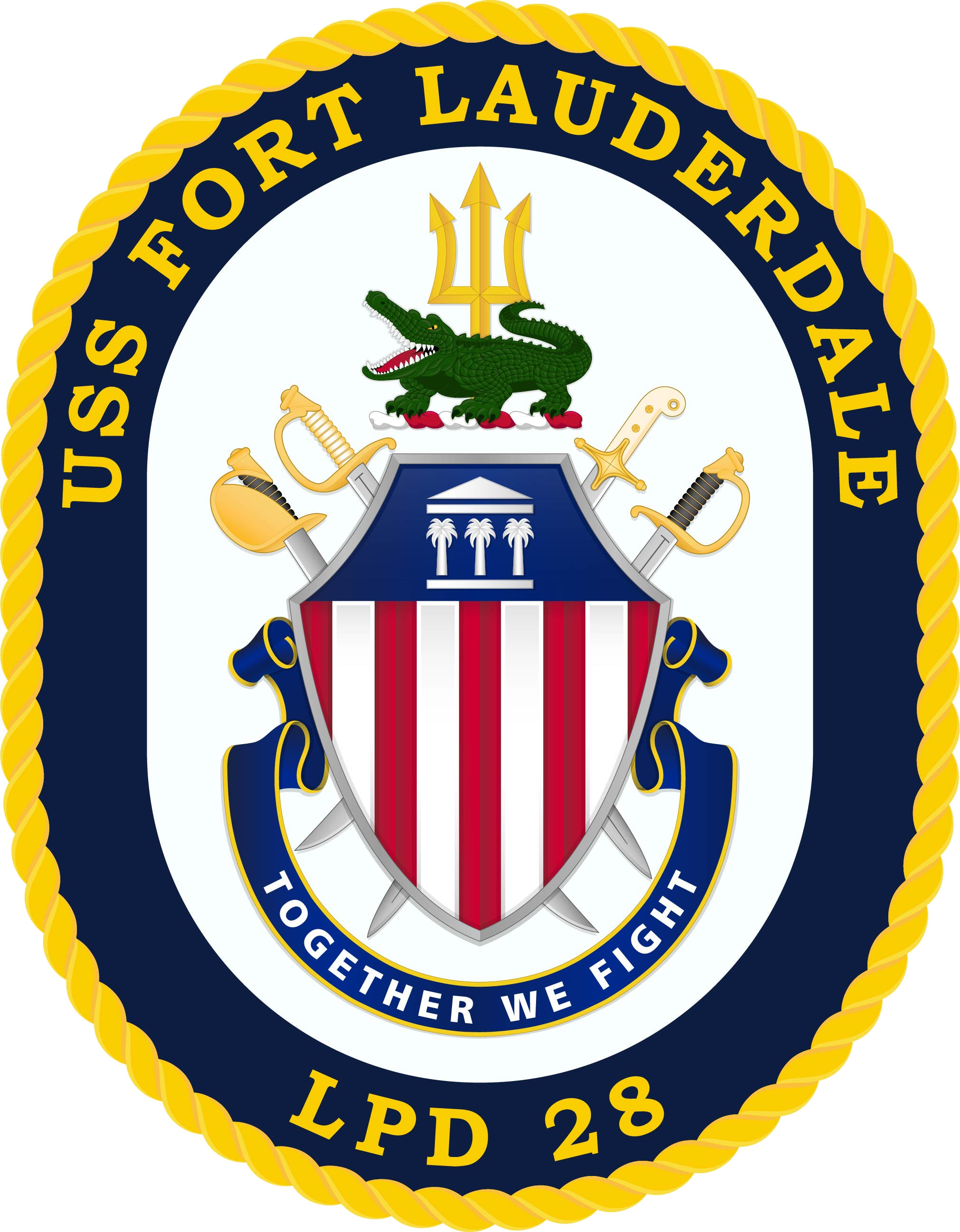
- Badge

General characteristics
- Class & type: San Antonio-class amphibious transport dock
- Displacement: 25,000 tons full
- Length: 208.5 m (684.1 ft) overall; 201.4 m (660.8 ft) waterline
- Beam: 31.9 m (104.7 ft) extreme; 29.5 m (96.8 ft) waterline
- Draft: 7.0 m (23.0 ft)
- Propulsion: Four Colt-Pielstick diesel engines, two shafts, 40,000 hp (29,828 kW)
- Speed: 22 knots (41 km/h)
- Boats & landing craft carried: 2 × LCACs (air cushion); or 1 × LCU (conventional)
- Capacity: 699 (66 officers, 633 enlisted); surge to 800 total.
- Complement: 28 officers, 333 enlisted
- Armament: 2 × 30 mm Bushmaster II cannon, for surface threat defense; 2 × Rolling Airframe Missile launchers for air defense
- Aircraft carried: 4 CH-46 Sea Knight helicopters or 2 MV-22 tilt rotor aircraft may be launched or recovered simultaneously.

USS Fort Lauderdale (LPD-28) is the twelfth Flight I San Antonio-class amphibious transport dock ship of the United States Navy. The ship is the first U.S. naval warship to be named for Fort Lauderdale, Florida.

== Design ==
Fort Lauderdale features design improvements developed in connection with the Navy's development of a next-generation dock landing ship, known as the LX(R)-class amphibious warfare ship. The LX(R) is intended to replace current Whidbey Island-class and Harpers Ferry-class dock landing ships. In 2014, the Navy commenced design of LX(R) based on a modified San Antonio-class design. Because this design work is in progress, the Navy has created design innovations and cost-reduction strategies around the San Antonio-class design, and the Navy believes that it can apply these innovations and strategies to Fort Lauderdale, allowing her to be built at reduced cost. The main design features intended to reduce the cost of Fort Lauderdale compared to the San Antonio-class on which she is based are simplified bow works, replacement of the forward and aft composite masts with steel masts, removal of structures from the boat valley, and a stern gate which is open at the top. This will make Fort Lauderdale a "transitional ship" between the current San Antonio-class design and future LX(R) vessels.

Fort Lauderdale incorporates high temperature superconductor-based mine protection degaussing system built by American Superconductor to reduce the magnetic signature of the ship.

== History ==
On 9 March 2016, the ship was given the name Fort Lauderdale, and the contract to build her was awarded to HII's Ingalls Shipyard on 19 December 2016. Fort Lauderdale's keel was laid down on 13 October 2017, at Ingalls Shipyard in Pascagoula, Mississippi. She was launched on 28 March 2020, and her acceptance trials were completed on 31 January 2022. The ship was commissioned during a ceremony in her namesake city of Fort Lauderdale, Florida, on 30 July 2022. She arrived at her homeport in Norfolk, Virginia on 4 August 2022.

In June 2024, Fort Lauderdale was part of Maryland Fleet Week at Baltimore Inner Harbor.

USS Fort Lauderdale left Norfolk base on 14 August 2025 alongside sister ship USS San Antonio, LHD USS Iwo Jima and two destroyers to the South Caribbean as a deployment for Operation Southern Spear.
