= USS New Orleans (LPD-18) =

US Navy amphibious transport ship

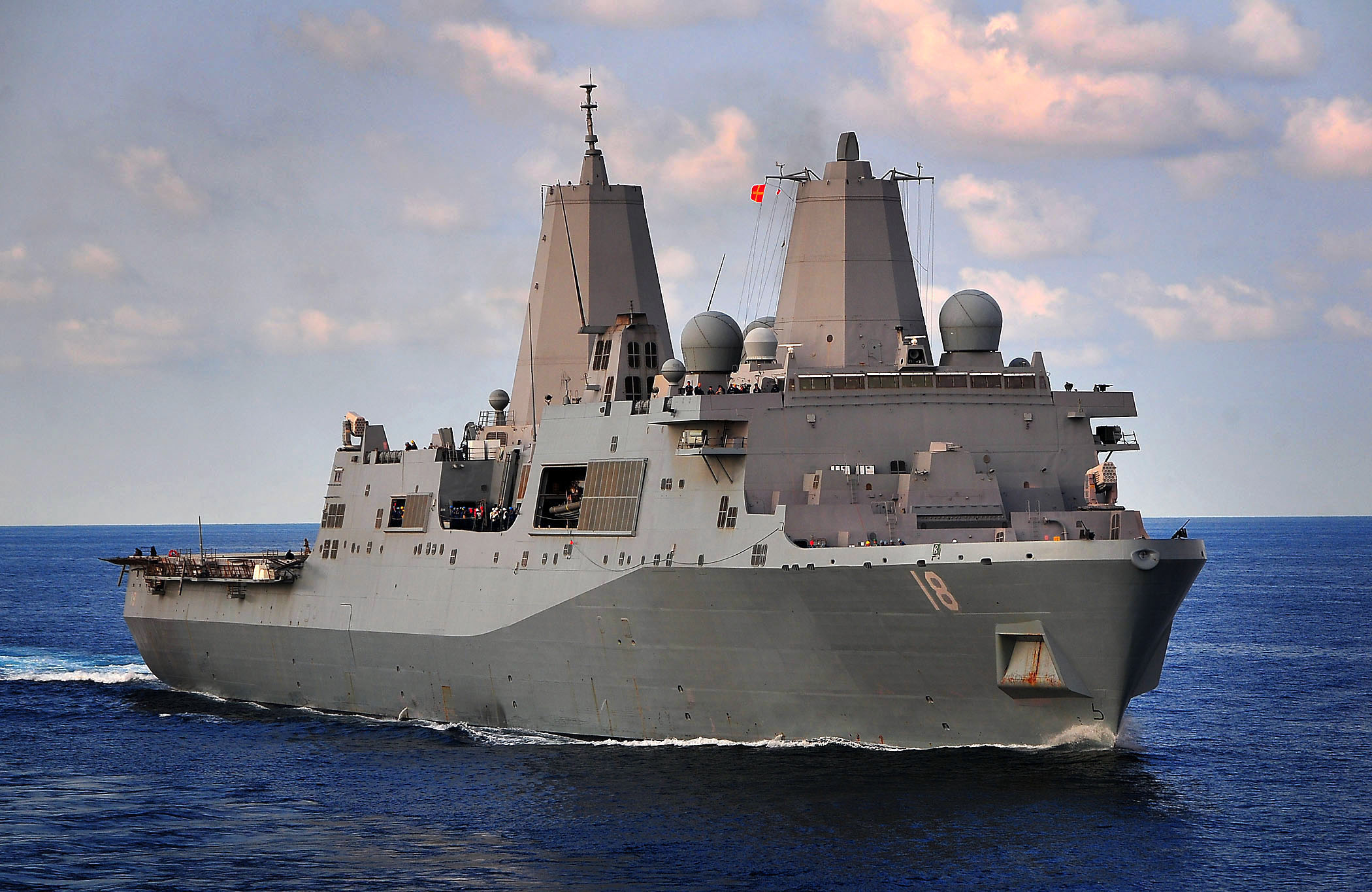
- USS New Orleans on 2 July 2009

History

United States
- Name: New Orleans
- Namesake: New Orleans
- Ordered: 18 December 1998
- Builder: Northrop Grumman Ship Systems
- Laid down: 14 October 2002
- Christened: 20 November 2004
- Launched: 11 December 2004
- Commissioned: 10 March 2007
- Home port: Sasebo
- Identification: MMSI number: 200700018; Callsign: NOLA; Pennant number: LPD-18
- Motto: Victory From the Sea
- Status: in active service
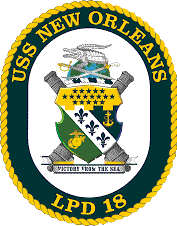
- Badge

General characteristics
- Class & type: San Antonio-class amphibious transport dock
- Displacement: 24,433 tons full
- Length: 208.4 m (684 ft) overall, 201.4 m (661 ft) waterline
- Beam: 32 m (105 ft) extreme, 29.5 m (97 ft) waterline
- Draft: 7 m (23 ft)
- Propulsion: Four Colt-Pielstick diesel engines, two shafts, 40,000 hp (30,000 kW)
- Boats & landing craft carried: Two LCACs (air cushion) or one Landing Craft Utility (conventional)
- Capacity: 700 marines (66 officers, 633 enlisted) w. surge to 800 total
- Complement: 33 officers, 364 enlisted
- Armament: 2 × 30 mm Bushmaster II guns for surface threat defense; 2 × RIM-116 Rolling Airframe Missile launchers for air defense & missile defense
- Aircraft carried: Four CH-46 Sea Knight helicopters or two MV-22 "Osprey" tilt rotor aircraft may be launched or recovered simultaneously.

USS New Orleans (LPD-18), a San Antonio-class amphibious transport dock, is the fourth commissioned ship of the United States Navy to be named after the city of New Orleans, Louisiana.

== History ==
=== Construction ===
The contract to build her was awarded on 18 December 1998 to Northrop Grumman Ship Systems of New Orleans, Louisiana, and her keel was laid down on 14 October 2002. The ship was christened on 20 November 2004, sponsored by Carolyn Shelton, the wife of General Henry H. Shelton, former chairman of the Joint Chiefs of Staff. The ship was launched three weeks later, on 11 December. The ship completed her builder's trials on 26 October 2006.

=== Commissioning ===
New Orleans was commissioned on 10 March 2007 in New Orleans, Louisiana. After commissioning, she steamed to San Diego, California via the Panama Canal to join the U.S. Pacific Fleet. The ship arrived at her new homeport of Naval Base San Diego on 3 May 2007 and was assigned to Amphibious Squadron Five.

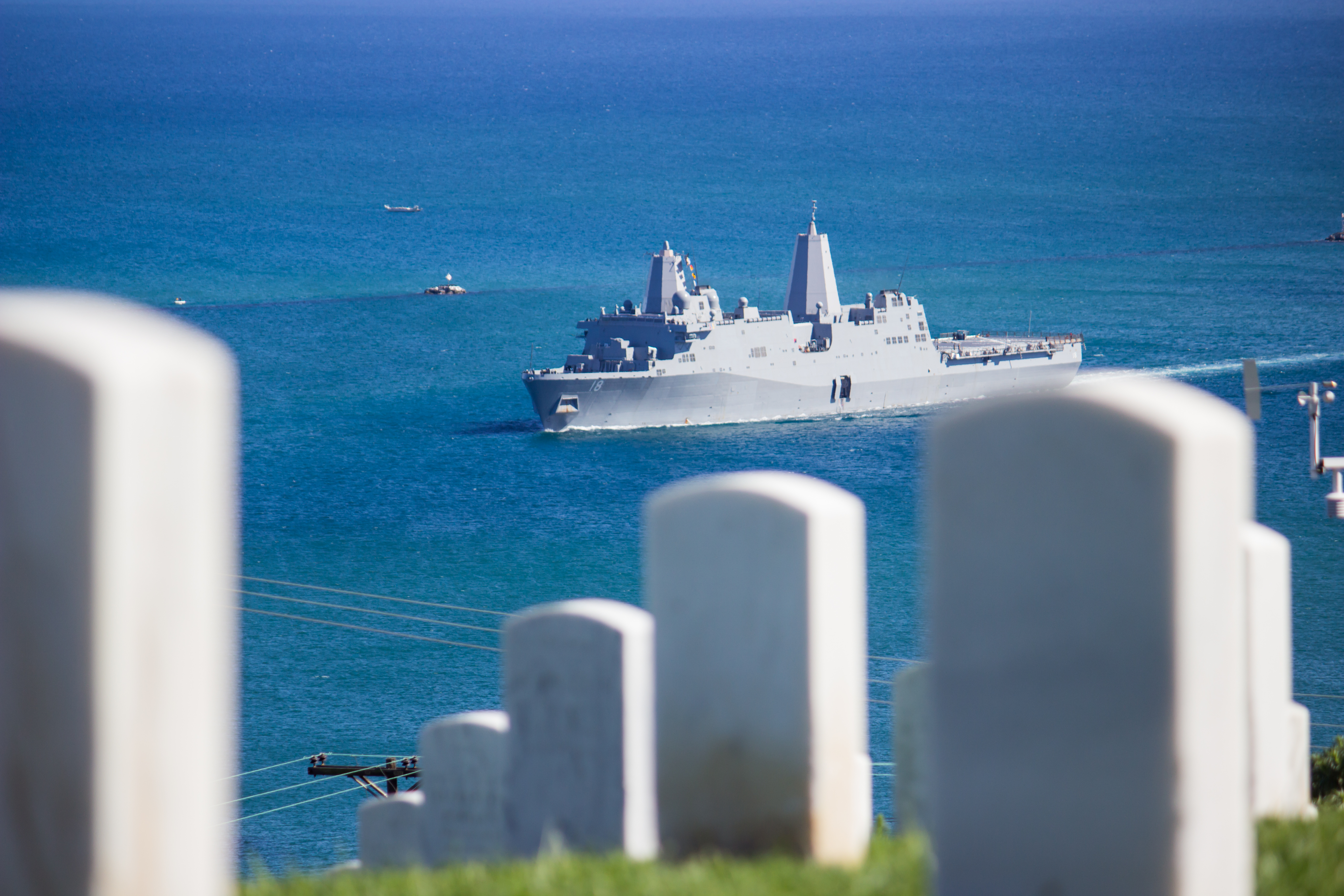
USS New Orleans entering San Diego

=== Fielding and issues ===
After arriving in San Diego, New Orleans required 400,000 more man-hours of construction to bring her to fully operational status. In August 2008, the ship failed her INSURV inspection. The INSURV inspectors documented 2,600 deficiencies, including problems with the steering system, broken ventilation fans, inoperable elevators, corrosion on the flight deck, and an unreliable propulsion system. "USS New Orleans was degraded in her ability to conduct sustained combat operations," the INSURV report said. US Navy officials reported that 85% of the deficiencies were minor issues and that most of the deficiencies had already been corrected.

On 9 January 2009, New Orleans departed San Diego on her initial deployment, as part of a five-ship expeditionary strike group (ESG) that also included USS Boxer and USS Comstock. The Boxer ESG and the 13th Marine Expeditionary Unit included more than 4,000 sailors and marines.

=== Collision with USS Hartford ===
On 20 March 2009 New Orleans was involved in a collision with the attack submarine USS Hartford in the Strait of Hormuz. Fifteen sailors on Hartford suffered minor injuries and the fuel tank on New Orleans was ruptured causing an oil spill of 25,000 gallons of diesel marine fuel. After the incident both vessels were able to continue under their own power.

=== Southern Partnership Station 2010 Deployment ===
After proving herself mission ready and fully recovered from 2009's collision with USS Hartford, New Orleans took part in Exercise Dawn Blitz. The joint exercise between 3rd Fleet and 1st Marine Expeditionary Force provided a training opportunity for 8,000 Sailors and Marines aboard 8 participating ships to practice amphibious assault and Blue/Green coordination in preparation for deployment.

From June through September, New Orleans deployed for the Southern Partnership Station 2010 to conduct combined maritime operations with Partner Nation navies in conjunction with multinational amphibious exercises. Embarked partner navies from across the world experienced some of the newest navy technology and the finest tactical and nautical expertise.

During her 2010 deployment, New Orleans conducted counter narcotics operations and made port visits to Manzillo, Mexico; Callao, Peru; and Balboa, Panama. In each port, New Orleans volunteered in community relations (COMREL) projects at orphanages and small villages. New Orleans crew dutifully represented the U.S. by upholding high standards of conduct and community service, and embarked members of the Mexican, Peruvian, Argentinean, Brazilian, Colombian, and Uruguay Navies were impressed by the professionalism and capability of the U.S. military.

=== First LPD-17 Class to Undergo Deperming ===
On 11 July 2011, New Orleans pulled into Point Loma's deperming slip, becoming the first of her class to undergo deperming. The evolution required 6 days and 96 cables wrapped around the ship by hand. By running electrical current through the cables, she reduced her magnetic signature to minimize vulnerability to mines. Upon completion, she passed through a degaussing range 14 times, displaying a magnetic signature less than that of most destroyers.

=== 2011 Fifth Fleet Deployment ===
New Orleans departed on 14 November 2011, for her third deployment. En route to 5th Fleet, she visited Cambodia to train with their navy. Both nations participated in joint man overboard drills as well as visit, board, search, and seizure (VBSS) exercises. She also pulled into Changi, Singapore, before chopping into 5th Fleet. Upon arrival in 5th Fleet, New Orleans was selected as the U.A.E. Ambassador's venue for his reception, hosting 300 international delegates in Abu Dhabi. She received accolades from ESG-5 for the successful execution of the event.

=== 2015 Exercises ===
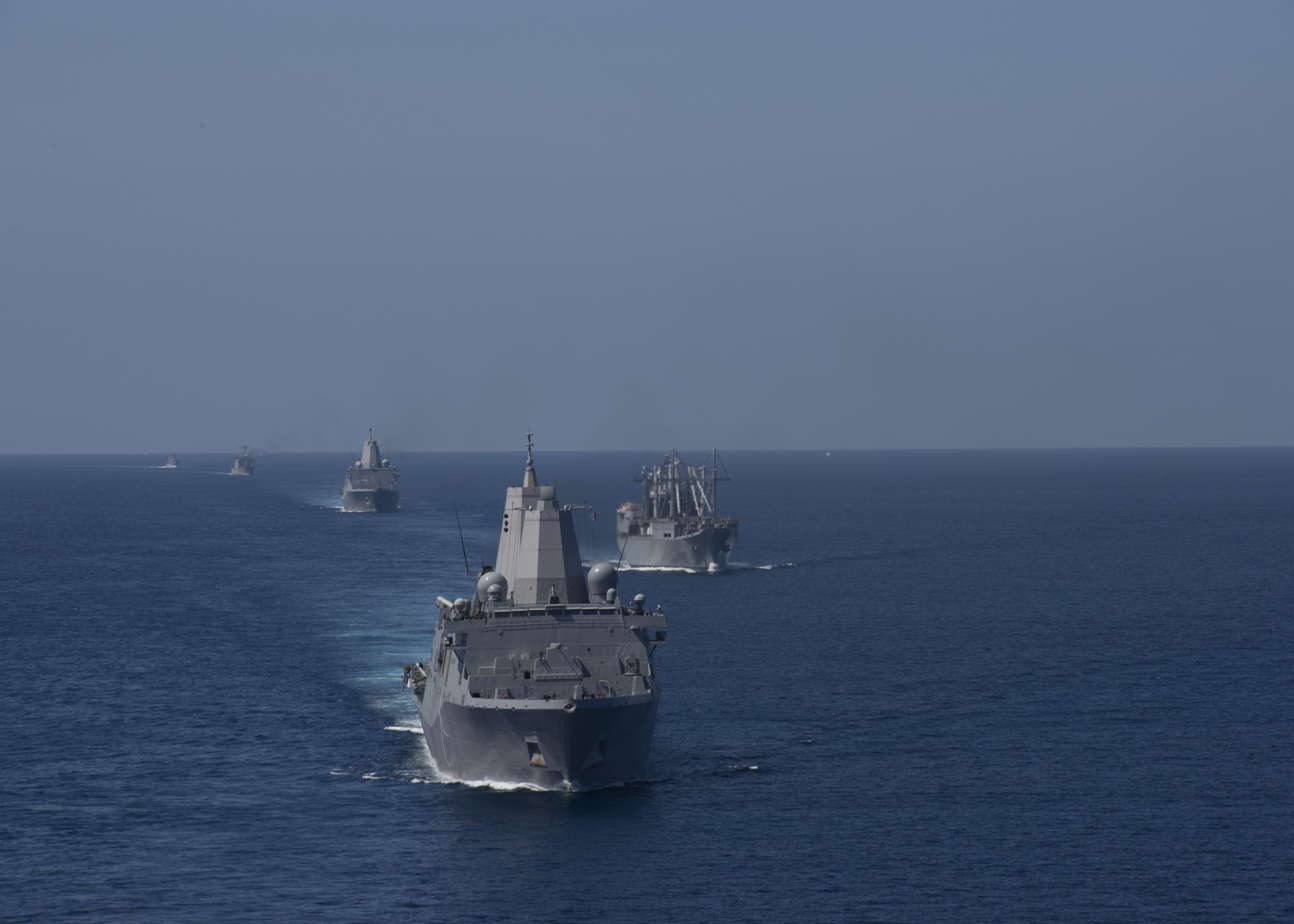
New Orleans sailing with SS Curtiss, USS Somerset, ARM Usumacinta, and ARM Revolucion, during Dawn Blitz, 1 September 2015.

In September, New Orleans joined other BOXARG units in support of Dawn Blitz 2015. This multi-national amphibious exercise showcased the tremendous capabilities of amphibious power projection.

She commenced her Composite Training Unit Exercise (COMPTUEX) in October. BOXARG COMPTUEX was designed to be the most challenging live scenario training event for an ARG/MEU to date, exercising all warfare areas to include amphibious warfare, surface warfare, air warfare, and command and control.

New Orleans got underway again in December to earn her certification for deployment. During the final days of the Certification Exercise (CERTEX), an MV-22 assigned to USS Boxer suffered a mishap on short approach to New Orleans during a routine passenger movement. New Orleans’ crew stabilized the aircraft, safely disembarked the passengers and flight crew, and then made preparations for an unplanned pier-side movement to Naval Station North Island in order to safely crane the stricken aircraft off the flight deck. Upon removing the aircraft, New Orleans got back underway for a successful completion of CERTEX.

=== 2016 WESTPAC Deployment ===
On 12 February 2016, New Orleans departed San Diego for a seven-month deployment and embarked Marines from 13th Marine Expeditionary Unit (MEU), sailors from Assault Craft Unit (ACU) 1, Assault Craft Unit (ACU) 5 and Beach Master Unit (BMU) 1 as part of the Boxer Amphibious Ready Group (ARG), comprising USS New Orleans (LPD-18), USS Boxer (LHD-4) and USS Harpers Ferry (LSD-49). The first stop on deployment was in Hawaii where New Orleans conducted four days of amphibious operations bringing thousands of Marines to the beach via MV-22 Ospreys and landing craft air cushions (LCAC) for extensive sustainment training.

On 8 March 2016, USS New Orleans participated in the Ssang Yong exercise. Ssang Yong was a multinational exercise with Republic of Korea Navy and Marine Corps, Australian Army, US Navy, and New Zealand Army forces that performed a variety of military operations from disaster relief to expeditionary operations.

The next mission for New Orleans was supporting coalition operations in Fifth Fleet and conducting maritime security operations in the Gulf of Aden. On 6 May 2016, it was reported that the U.S. staged the USS Boxer ARG, off the coast of Yemen with roughly 4,500 U.S. Marines of the 13th MEU in the flotilla to provide support to coalition forces in Yemen fighting AQAP militants.

On 16 June 2016, Boxer ARG took part in Operation Inherent Resolve; AV-8BII Harriers of the 13th MEU began airstrikes against ISIL in Iraq and Syria. On 29 June 2016, New Orleans hit a major milestone in the deployment as she anchored off the coast of Camp Buehring, Kuwait to offload nearly 1,000 tons of vehicles and machinery for an agricultural wash down, before returning to Manama, Bahrain for mid-deployment maintenance.

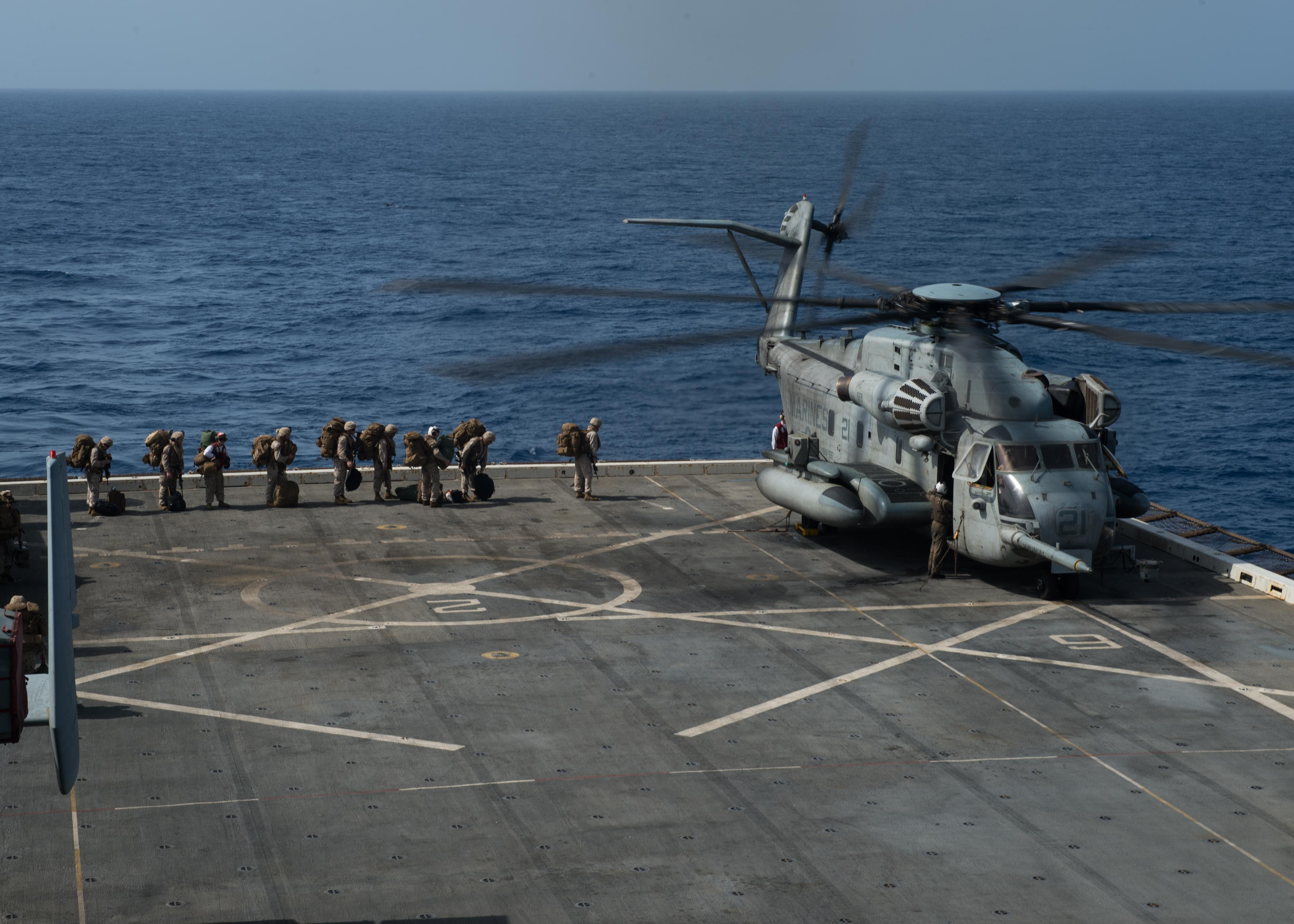

A week later, New Orleans sailed back into 7th Fleet and entered port on 25 July to visit Colombo, Sri Lanka. In this port, New Orleans had the opportunity to enhance US Navy bilateral ties with the Sri Lankan Navy, and exchange best practices on Humanitarian Assistance and Disaster Relief (HADR). The visit included several receptions, daily ship tours, sports events with Sri Lankan and US Navy/Marine Corps personnel, and HADR training held by embarked Marines.

The captain and Sri Lankan dignitaries cut cake during a reception on New Orleans' flight deck In August, New Orleans made a port visit in Bali, Indonesia for a few days, then shortly after stopped in Pearl Harbor, Hawaii. New Orleans completed her WESTPAC deployment, returning to San Diego on 16 September 2016.

=== Maintenance Phase ===
On 9 January 2017, USS New Orleans moved into the Dry-dock Ships Selected Availability (DSRA) at BAE Systems shipyard. The crew and hundreds of contractors went through an extensive list of repairs and upgrades to the ship's hull, tanks, ventilation, auxiliary, propulsion, and combat systems. After 10 months being dry docked, on 28 November New Orleans was undocked and begun preparation for work ups.

Over the next six months, USS New Orleans accomplished moving the crew back onboard from the barge, Engineering Light-Off Assessment (LOA), and Combat Systems Light-Off. By mid-October, New Orleans went underway for the first time in 23 months for Contractor Sea Trials. The DSRA and the maintenance phase officially ended with the completion of Type Commander (TYCOM) Sea Trials in mid-November.

=== PACBLITZ 2019 ===
In March 2019, New Orleans participated in Exercise Pacific Blitz 19 (PACBLITZ), an exercise that combines logistics and amphibious concepts from exercises Pacific Horizon and Dawn Blitz. PACBLITZ involved 5,000 Marines and Sailors from Marine Expeditionary Force and 5,000 Sailors spread across several installations, including Naval Base San Diego, Marine Corps Base Camp Pendleton, Marine Corps Air Station Miramar, Naval Surface Warfare Center Port Hueneme and Naval Air Station Point Mugu. The amphibious transport dock USS Somerset (LPD-25), guided-missile destroyer USS Michael Murphy (DDG-112), maritime prepositioning ship USNS William R. Button (T-AK-3012) and aviation logistics ship SS Curtiss (T-AVB-4) also participated. The exercise was three weeks long of fast-paced amphibious operations where New Orleans launched and recovered multiple LCACs, AAVs, and LCUs off of San Clemente and Camp Pendleton beaches as well as MV-22 Ospreys.

=== First LPD/LSV Stern Gate Marriage ===
New Orleans became the first San Antonio-class amphibious transport dock ship to successfully complete a "stern gate marriage" with an Army logistics support vessel (LSV) while moored in Pearl Harbor on 24 October 2019. A "stern gate marriage" is a maneuver in which a craft's bow ramp is lowered onto a ship's stern gate for vehicle and cargo transfer. The Army's USAV CW3 Harold C. Clinger (LSV-2) was able to safely lower its stern gate into New Orleans’ well deck, then Marine Corps vehicles were quickly driven onto New Orleans. The successful marriage demonstrates just one more method by which the San Antonio-class can support a myriad of potential missions from humanitarian aid and disaster relief to amphibious assault.

=== 2019 Homeport Shift to Forward Deployed Naval Force-Japan ===
New Orleans joined the U.S. 7th Fleet amphibious force in Sasebo, 1 November 2019, transiting the Pacific Ocean from her former homeport of San Diego. Her addition increased the total strength of amphibious ships in Japan to five, joining USS America (LHA 6), USS Green Bay (LPD 20), USS Ashland (LSD 48) and USS Germantown (LSD 42).

=== 20.1 FDNF-J Patrol ===
In spring of 2020, New Orleans embarked on her maiden voyage as Forward-Deployed Naval Forces-Japan (FDNF-J) for patrol shortly after the homeport shift. She made her presence felt in the East China Sea conducting operations in support of United Nations sanctions against vessels suspected of conducting illegal transfers of oil and other goods to and from North Korea. She maintained mission readiness throughout the COVID-19 pandemic, executing a COVID-free 7th Fleet patrol.

=== 2025 fire ===
On August 20, 2025, the ship had a fire aboard for 12 hours off the coast of Okinawa, Japan. Two sailors sustained minor injuries.

=== 2026 Iran and Strait of Hormuz crisis ===
In March 2026, The Wall Street Journal reported that USS Tripoli had been deployed, and was en route, to the Middle East to provide support for Operation Epic Fury. Tripoli is part of an amphibious ready group (ARG), and is being accompanied by USS San Diego and New Orleans. The ARG is reportedly transporting around 2,200 Marine Corps personnel from the Okinawa-based 31st Marine Expeditionary Unit (MEU) and will join the USS Abraham Lincoln-led Carrier Strike Group 3 which is already deployed in the region.

San Diego and New Orleans crossed the strait one day prior to Tripoli which was approaching the northern exit of the Strait of Malacca on 17 March 2026 as per the AIS tracking data accessed by the CNN. As of 20 March, the ships are located to the south of Sri Lanka and is expected to enter the Arabian Sea the following week and will reach the war theatre around 22–23 March.

Meanwhile, the POTUS has explained in a press conference that he is not "putting troops anywhere" though he would not tell the journalists even if he had taken such decision. However, Reuters cited multiple US security officials saying that the Trump administration is still "considering deploying thousands of U.S. troops to reinforce its operation in the Middle East". The ARG deployment might also be used to free or open the Strait of Hormuz or assaulting the Kharg Island. There has been no firm decision.

On 19 March 2026, Newsmax reported that USS Rushmore might join the Tripoli Amphibious Ready Group since San Diego, which initially sailed with Tripoli and New Orleans, is expected to "hang back" to the Pacific for maintenance which was in the Philippine Sea. On the other hand, the US military also accelerated the deployment of the Boxer Amphibious Ready Group from San Diego.
