= USS Richard M. McCool Jr. =

US Navy amphibious transport ship

USS Richard M. McCool Jr. (LPD-29)
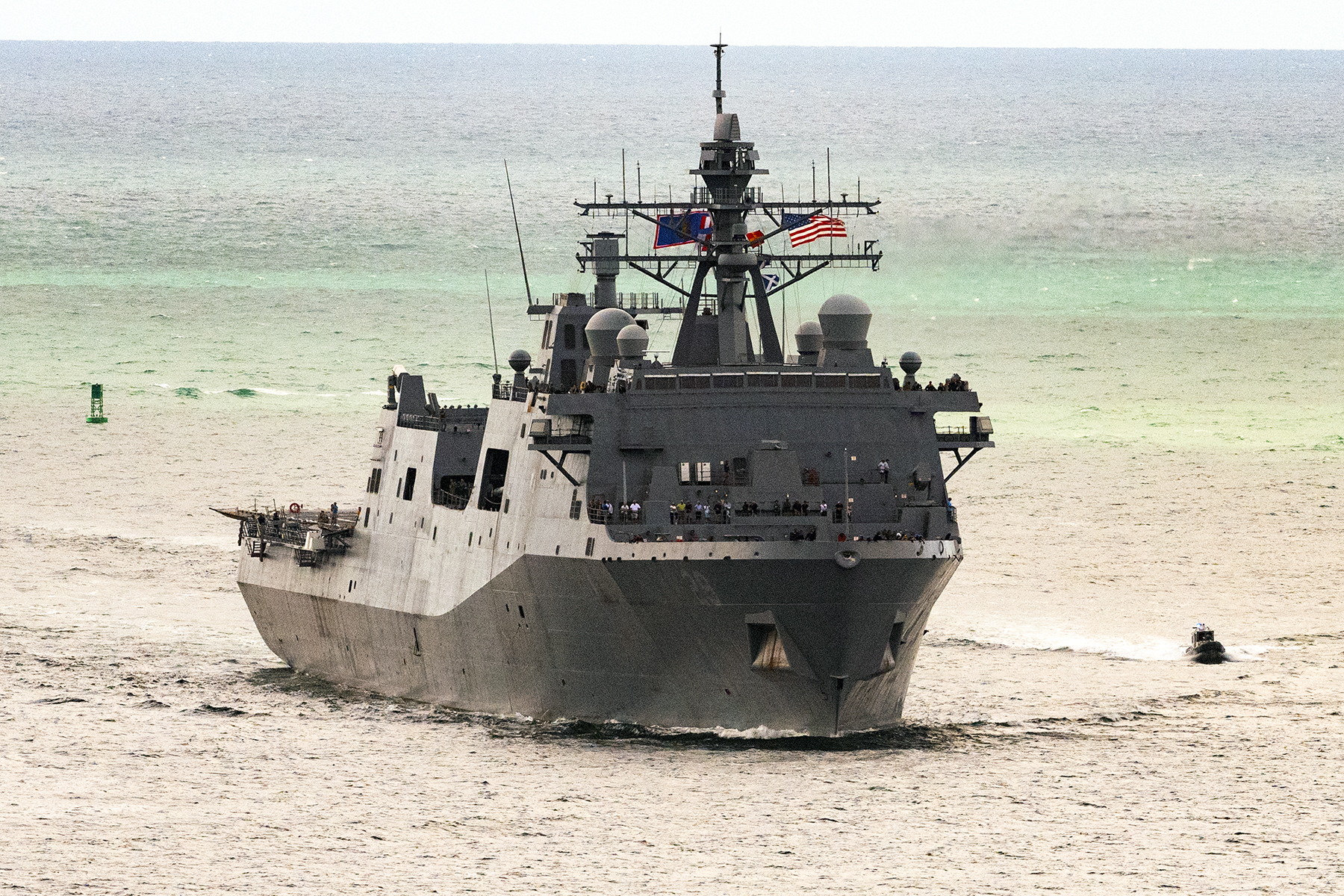
- USS Richard M. McCool Jr. (LPD-29) arrives at Naval Air Station Pensacola

History

United States
- Name: Richard M. McCool Jr.
- Namesake: Richard Miles McCool
- Awarded: 23 February 2018
- Builder: Ingalls Shipbuilding
- Cost: US$1.4B (FY2017)
- Laid down: 12 April 2019
- Launched: 5 January 2022
- Sponsored by: Shana McCool, Kate Oja
- Christened: 11 June 2022
- Acquired: 11 April 2024
- Commissioned: 7 September 2024
- Home port: Norfolk
- Identification: Pennant number: LPD-29
- Motto: Certa ut unitas non ut singuli, "Fight as a unit, not as individuals"
- Status: in active service
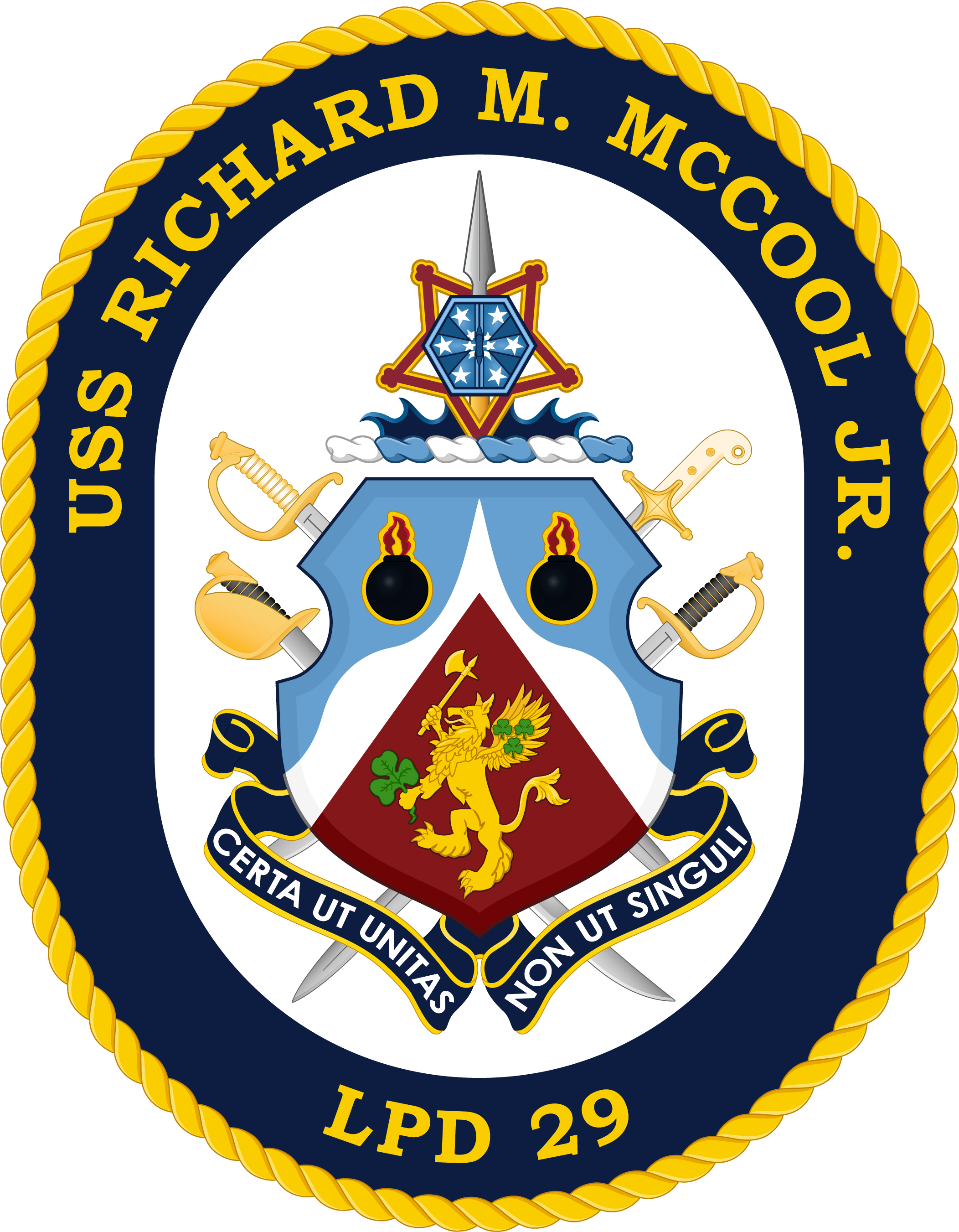
- Badge

General characteristics
- Class & type: San Antonio-class amphibious transport dock
- Displacement: 25,000 tons full
- Length: 208.5 m (684 ft) overall, 201.4 m (661 ft) waterline
- Beam: 31.9 m (105 ft) extreme, 29.5 m (97 ft) waterline
- Draft: 7 m (23 ft)
- Propulsion: Four Colt-Pielstick diesel engines, two shafts, 40,000 hp (30 MW)
- Speed: 22 knots (41 km/h)
- Boats & landing craft carried: 2 x LCACs (air cushion) or; 1 x LCU (conventional)
- Capacity: 699 (66 officers, 633 enlisted); surge to 800 total.
- Complement: 28 officers, 333 enlisted
- Sensors & processing systems: AN/SPS-73(V)18 - Next Generation Surface Search Radar; AN/SPY-6(V)2 EASR Rotating Radar
- Armament: 2 x 30 mm Bushmaster II cannons, for surface threat defense; 2 x Rolling Airframe Missile launchers for air defense
- Aircraft carried: Four CH-46 Sea Knight helicopters or two MV-22 tilt rotor aircraft may be launched or recovered simultaneously.

USS Richard M. McCool Jr. (LPD-29) is the 13th and final Flight I San Antonio-class amphibious transport dock of the United States Navy. She is named after US Navy officer and Medal of Honor recipient Richard M. McCool, Jr. Richard M. McCool Jr. was built by Ingalls Shipbuilding in Pascagoula, Mississippi. She was christened on 11 June 2022, formally delivered to the US Navy on 11 April 2024, and commissioned on 7 September 2024.

== Design ==
Like her immediate predecessor, USS Fort Lauderdale (LPD-28), Richard M. McCool Jr. was designed be a "transitional ship" between the current San Antonio-class Flight I design and future Flight II vessels, starting with USS Harrisburg (LPD-30), and as such will feature design improvements developed in connection with the Navy's development of the LX(R)-class amphibious warfare ship, (which is intended to replace the current Whidbey Island-class and Harpers Ferry-class dock landing ships). Richard M. McCool Jr. incorporates the changes that were introduced in Fort Lauderdale intended to reduce the cost compared to the San Antonio-class, including: simplified bow works, replacement of the forward and aft composite masts with steel masts, removal of structures from the boat valley, and a stern gate which is open at the top. In addition, unlike Fort Lauderdale, Richard M. McCool Jr. uses the Enterprise Air Surveillance Radar (EASR) volume air search radar.
