= San Antonio-class amphibious transport dock =

Warship class of the US Navy

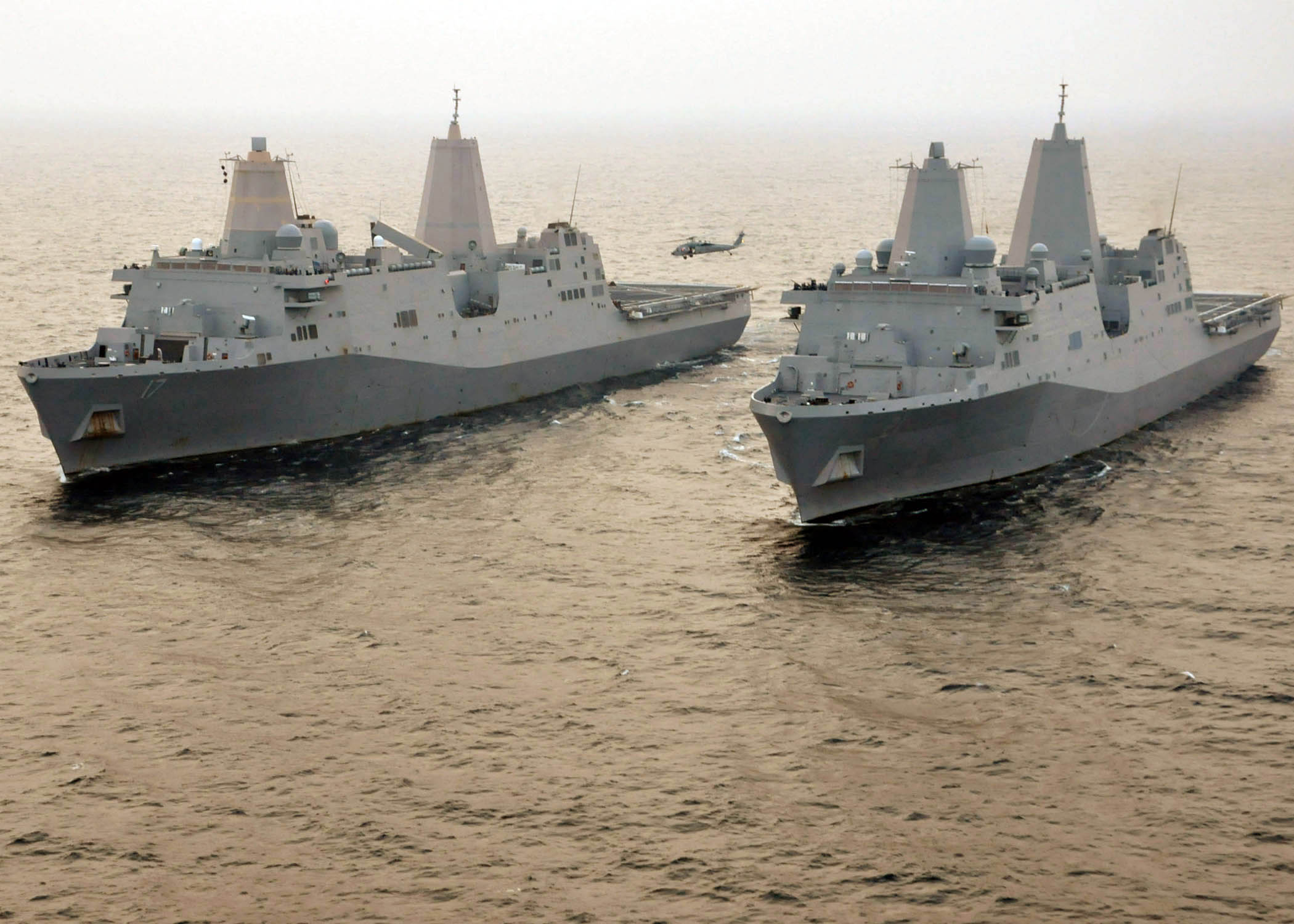
- USS San Antonio (L) and USS New York (R) in June 2011

Class overview
- Builders: Avondale Shipyard (before 2014); Ingalls Shipbuilding (after 2014)
- Operators: United States Navy
- Preceded by: Austin-class amphibious transport dock; Newport-class tank landing ship; Charleston-class amphibious cargo ship; Whidbey Island-class dock landing ship
- Cost: $1.602 billion (avg. for class, FY2012); $2.021 billion (last ship, FY2012)
- Built: 2000–present
- In commission: 2006–present
- Planned: 26 (13 for Flight I and 13 for Flight II)
- On order: 3
- Building: 3
- Completed: 13
- Active: 13

General characteristics
- Type: Amphibious transport dock
- Displacement: 25,300 t (full)
- Length: 684 ft (208 m)
- Beam: 105 ft (32 m)
- Draft: 23 ft (7.0 m), full load
- Propulsion: Four sequentially turbocharged marine Colt-Pielstick diesel engines, two shafts, 41,600 shp
- Speed: In excess of 22 knots (25 mph; 41 km/h)
- Boats & landing craft carried: 2 × LCACs (air cushion) or; 1 × LCU (conventional); and; 14 × Amphibious Assault Vehicles
- Complement: Crew: 28 officers, and 333 enlisted sailors; Landing force: 66 officers, and 633 enlisted troops
- Sensors & processing systems: AN/SPS-48G, AN/SPQ-9B
- Electronic warfare & decoys: AN/SLQ-32
- Armament: 2 × Bushmaster II close-in-guns; 2 × RIM-116 Rolling Airframe Missile launchers; 2 × 8 cell Mark 41 Vertical Launching System for quad-packed ESSMs (not fitted); Several twin M2 Browning machine gun turrets
- Aircraft carried: Launch or land up to two MV-22 Osprey tilt-rotor aircraft simultaneously with room to place four MV-22s on the flight deck and one in the hangar deck

The San Antonio class is a class of amphibious transport docks, also called a "landing platform, dock" (LPD), used by the United States Navy. These warships replace the Austin-class LPDs (including Cleveland and Trenton sub-classes), as well as the Newport-class tank landing ships, the Anchorage-class dock landing ships, and the Charleston-class amphibious cargo ships that have already been retired.

Twelve ships of the San Antonio class were originally proposed, their original target price was US$890 million; as built, their average cost is $1.6 billion. Defense Authorization for Fiscal Year 2015 included partial funding for the twelfth San Antonio-class ship. As of December 2022 eleven warships of this class were in service with the U.S. Navy, with an additional three ships under construction. The Navy decided in 2018 to produce a second flight of 13 planned LPD Flight II ships, for a total of 26 in the LPD 17 class; LPD 30, Harrisburg, is the first Flight II ship.

== Design ==
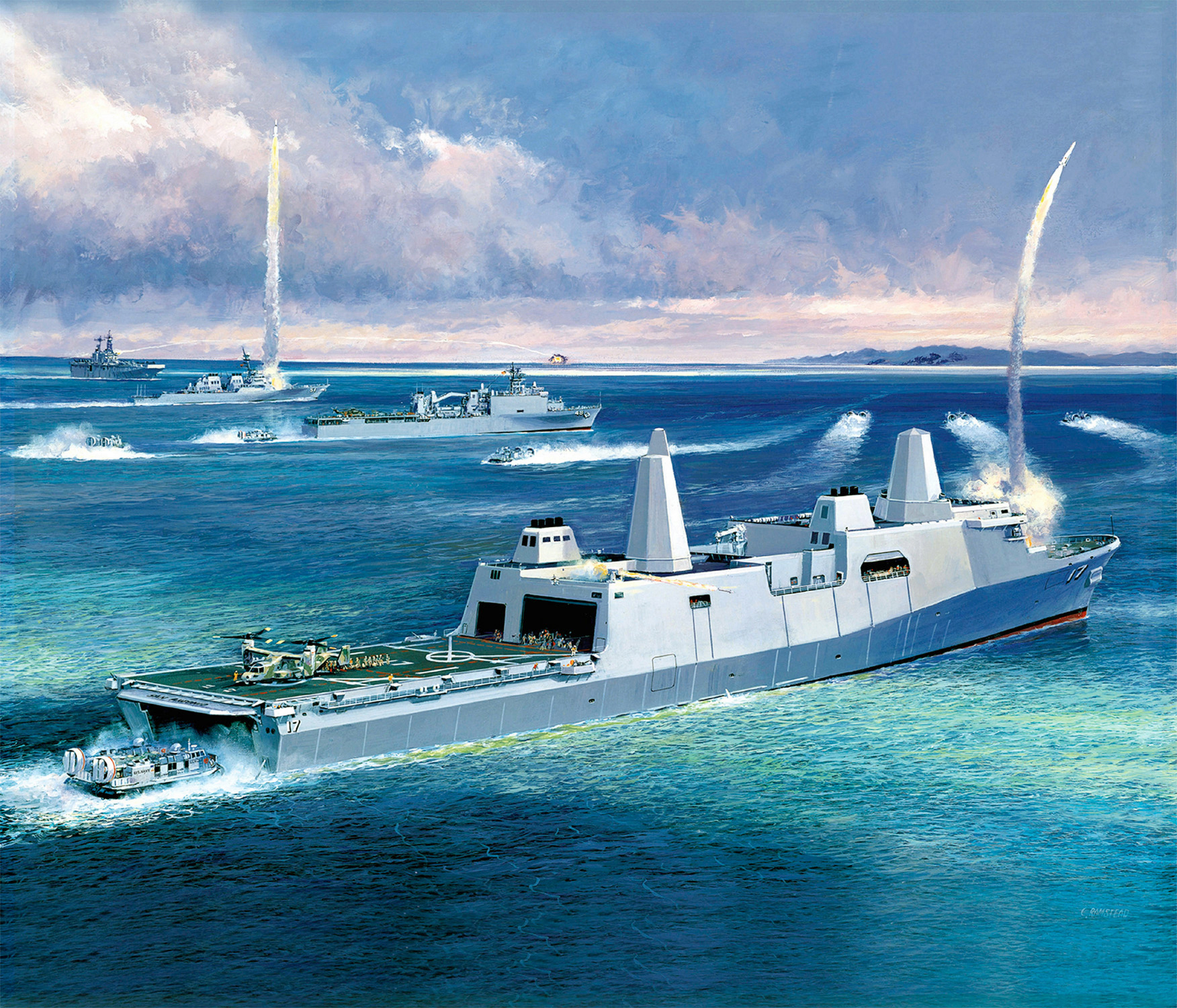
Artist's concept of the San Antonio Class amphibious transport dock ships

The San Antonio class was designed to provide the Navy and U.S. Marine Corps with modern, sea-based platforms that are networked, survivable, and built to operate with 21st century transformational platforms, such as the MV-22 Osprey, the (since canceled) Expeditionary Fighting Vehicle (EFV), Landing Craft Air Cushion (LCACs), and future means by which Marines are delivered ashore. The ship is more than 45 percent larger than the Austin class, displacing more than 25,000 tons at full load. It carries fewer troops, but has twice as much space for vehicles, landing craft, and aircraft. The ships are also suited to act as recovery ships for spacecraft, with a floodable well deck at the back of the vessel into which a capsule can float; Portland was the recovery ship for the Orion capsule of the Artemis 1 uncrewed Moon-orbiting mission on 11 December 2022.

The project embraced a "Design for Ownership" philosophy; a concurrent engineering approach that injects operator, maintainer, and trainer input into the design development process. The goal was to ensure that operational realities are considered throughout the total ship design, integration, construction, test and life cycle support of the new ships and their systems. This process was intended to improve combat readiness, enhance quality of life, and reduce Total Ownership Costs, and resulted in numerous changes during the project.

The San Antonio class has significant survivability features and computer technology. In addition to Rolling Airframe Missile (RAM) protection from air threats, the class was designed to minimize radar signature. Techniques that reduce radar cross-section (RCS) make the ships more difficult to locate and target. Enhanced survivability features include improved nuclear blast and fragmentation protection and a shock-hardened structure. The fiber-optic shipboard-wide area network (SWAN) connects onboard-integrated systems. The network will allow "plug in and fight" configuration, updating and replacing hardware more easily when newer technology becomes available. Moreover, the class has extensive communications, command, control, and intelligence systems to support current and projected expeditionary warfare missions of the 21st century.

The class is fitted with the integrated Ship Self-Defense System (SSDS). The system fuses the radars and other sensors and controls the weapons systems for an automated fast reaction capability against air threats.

The Advanced Enclosed Mast/Sensors (AEM/S) System mast, a 93-foot-high octagonal structure 35 feet in diameter, is constructed of a multi-layer frequency-selective composite material. It is designed to permit the ship's own sensor frequencies with very low loss while reflecting other frequencies. The tapered octagonal shape of the AEM/S is designed to reduce the radar cross section, and enclosing the antennas provides improved performance and greatly reduces maintenance costs. The composite mast was replaced by a conventional mast starting from USS Fort Lauderdale as a transition to the LX(R)-class amphibious warfare ship design.

The San Antonio-class also incorporates the latest quality of life standards for the embarked Marines and sailors, including sit-up berths, a ship services mall, a learning resource center, and a fitness center. Medical facilities include two operating rooms and 124 beds. Additionally, they are the first USN ships designed to accommodate sailors and Marines of both sexes as part of the crew and embarked troops.

By mid-2016, the Navy and Marine Corps were studying installing a vertical launch system (VLS) into San Antonio-class ships so they could field larger offensive missiles. The original ship concept included two 8-cell Mk 41 VLS in the bow, which is being reexamined to add Tomahawk cruise missiles to support Marines ashore with little modification to the combat system.

== History ==
Following the extended problems and incidents experienced by USS San Antonio, the U.S. Department of Defense's Director, Operational Test and Evaluation (DOT&E), stated in 2010 that the ships are "capable of operating 'in a benign environment', but not effective, suitable and not survivable in a combat situation". The DOT&E found in 2011 that the first ship of the class, USS San Antonio, had several deficiencies which rendered it "not operationally effective, suitable, or survivable in a hostile environment". In April 2015, the USN proposed adding a 12th ship to the class, which will be built at Ingalls in exchange for a destroyer to be named later. On 4 December 2015, the 12th ship was ordered.

=== Derivatives ===
U.S. senator Kay Hagan has asked if the LPD-17 construction line should be extended to a twelfth ship as a bridge to building the LX(R) (formerly LSD(X)) on the same hull, but the USN has indicated that the requirements of the LX(R) have not yet been settled and that the LPD-17 hull might be too large for such a mission. However, Commandant James F. Amos had also endorsed dropping LSD in favor of continued LPD production.

In October 2014, Secretary of the Navy Ray Mabus signed an internal memo recommending that the LX(R) warship be based on the existing San Antonio-class design. The LPD-17 design was selected over a foreign variant, and an entirely new design to meet required capability, capacity, and cost parameters. Official selection of basing the LX(R) off the LPD-17 design still has to come with Milestone A approval. The National Defense Authorization Act for Fiscal Year 2015 included partial funding for a twelfth San Antonio-class ship (LPD-28). In early 2014, Huntington Ingalls Industries (HII) displayed its Flight IIA version of the LPD-17 hull for the Navy's LX(R) amphibious ship. The design is further modified by removing some of the higher-end capabilities of the San Antonio class to create an "amphibious truck" to replace the Whidbey Island and Harpers Ferry landing ship docks. The Flight IIA has improved command and control (C2) features over the LSDs, half the medical spaces of the LPD-17, a smaller hangar, no composite masts, two unspecified main propulsion diesel engines (MPDE), two spots for LCACs or one LCU, a reduced troop capacity (500), and a crew of about 400 sailors. In January 2015, the Navy and Marine Corps decided to go with the modified LPD-17 hull for the LX(R) program.

Chief of Naval Operations Greenert considered using some of the extra space in the San Antonio class to mount modular equipment in the same fashion as the littoral combat ships. As part of their bid to offer "Flight II" LPD-17s for the dock landing ship replacement contract, HII has suggested fitting out the ships to carry the Aegis Ballistic Missile Defense System. Although there is no formal requirement for the BMD variant, HII report unofficial support for it within the U.S. Navy, such that it will be modeled in wargame scenarios in 2016 and 2017. It could accommodate up to 288 Mk41 VLS missile tubes and a radar with 1000 times the sensitivity of the SPY-1D radar of the Burke destroyers.

=== Flight II ===
On 2 August 2018, the U.S. Navy and Huntington Ingalls signed a contract for long lead items for LPD-30, the first of the 13-ship more affordable Flight II class. The contract was for US$165.5M. The cost goal is US$1.64B for the first ship and $1.4B for subsequent ships. LPD-30 will be fitted with a Raytheon AN/SPY-6 Enterprise Air Surveillance Radar, an upgrade over the AN/SPS-48 currently in LPD-17s. Huntington Ingalls will build the new flight exclusively. On 26 March 2019, Huntington Ingalls announced the award of a US$1.47 billion, fixed-price incentive contract for LPD 30 (14th ship and first of Flight II). On 10 October 2019, the name of the ship was announced as USS Harrisburg for Harrisburg, Pennsylvania, the state's capital. On 3 April 2020, Huntington Ingalls announced that it was awarded a $1.5 billion contract modification for the construction of USS Pittsburgh, named for Pittsburgh, Pennsylvania.

The Flight II ships are intended to provide the mission currently provided by the Whidbey Island-class dock landing ships and incorporate more than 200 changes over the Flight I ships. The mission provided by Flight II ships will include airport, seaport, and hospital operations and incorporate modifications to the ships’ well decks.

As of March 2023, the US Navy is proposing to temporarily halt acquiring additional San Antonio-class ships beyond LPD-32. This move would be part of a "strategic pause," according to Navy Secretary Carlos Del Toro, that would allow the force to better examine what they need to get out of the ships and how many they ultimately need. Under this plan, LPD-32 would be purchased in the 2022–2023 fiscal year.

In August 2024, Congress authorized the Navy to begin a multi-year procurement of three ships. The multi-year procurement deal, spanning FY25 to FY29, will save an estimated $901M compared to individual ship buys. These three ships are excluded from this page's "on order" counts until formally executed.

== Ships of the class ==
Name	Hull number	Builder	Laid down	Launched	Commissioned	Home port	Status
Flight I
San Antonio	LPD-17	Avondale	9 December 2000	12 July 2003	14 January 2006	Norfolk, Virginia	Active
New Orleans	LPD-18	Avondale	14 October 2002	11 December 2004	10 March 2007	Sasebo, Nagasaki	Active
Mesa Verde	LPD-19	Ingalls	25 February 2003	19 November 2004	15 December 2007	Norfolk, Virginia	Active
Green Bay	LPD-20	Avondale	11 August 2003	11 August 2006	24 January 2009	San Diego, California	Active
New York	LPD-21	Avondale	10 September 2004	19 December 2007	7 November 2009	Norfolk, Virginia	Active
San Diego	LPD-22	Ingalls	23 May 2007	7 May 2010	19 May 2012	Sasebo, Nagasaki	Active
Anchorage	LPD-23	Avondale	24 September 2007	12 February 2011	4 May 2013	San Diego, California	Active
Arlington	LPD-24	Ingalls	26 May 2008	23 November 2010	8 February 2013	Norfolk, Virginia	Active
Somerset	LPD-25	Avondale	11 December 2009	14 April 2012	1 March 2014	San Diego, California	Active
John P. Murtha	LPD-26	Ingalls	6 February 2012	30 October 2014	8 October 2016	San Diego, California	Active
Portland	LPD-27	Ingalls	2 August 2013	13 February 2016	14 December 2017	San Diego, California	Active
Flight I (Transitional)
Fort Lauderdale	LPD-28	Ingalls	13 October 2017	28 March 2020	30 July 2022	Norfolk, Virginia	Active
Richard M. McCool Jr.	LPD-29	Ingalls	12 April 2019	5 January 2022	7 September 2024	Norfolk, Virginia	Active
Flight II
Harrisburg	LPD-30	Ingalls	28 January 2022	5 October 2024			Launched
Pittsburgh	LPD-31	Ingalls	2 June 2023				Under construction
Philadelphia	LPD-32	Ingalls	3 March 2026				Under construction
Travis Manion	LPD-33	Ingalls					Authorized
TBD	LPD-34	Ingalls					Authorized
TBD	LPD-35	Ingalls					Authorized

== Gallery ==
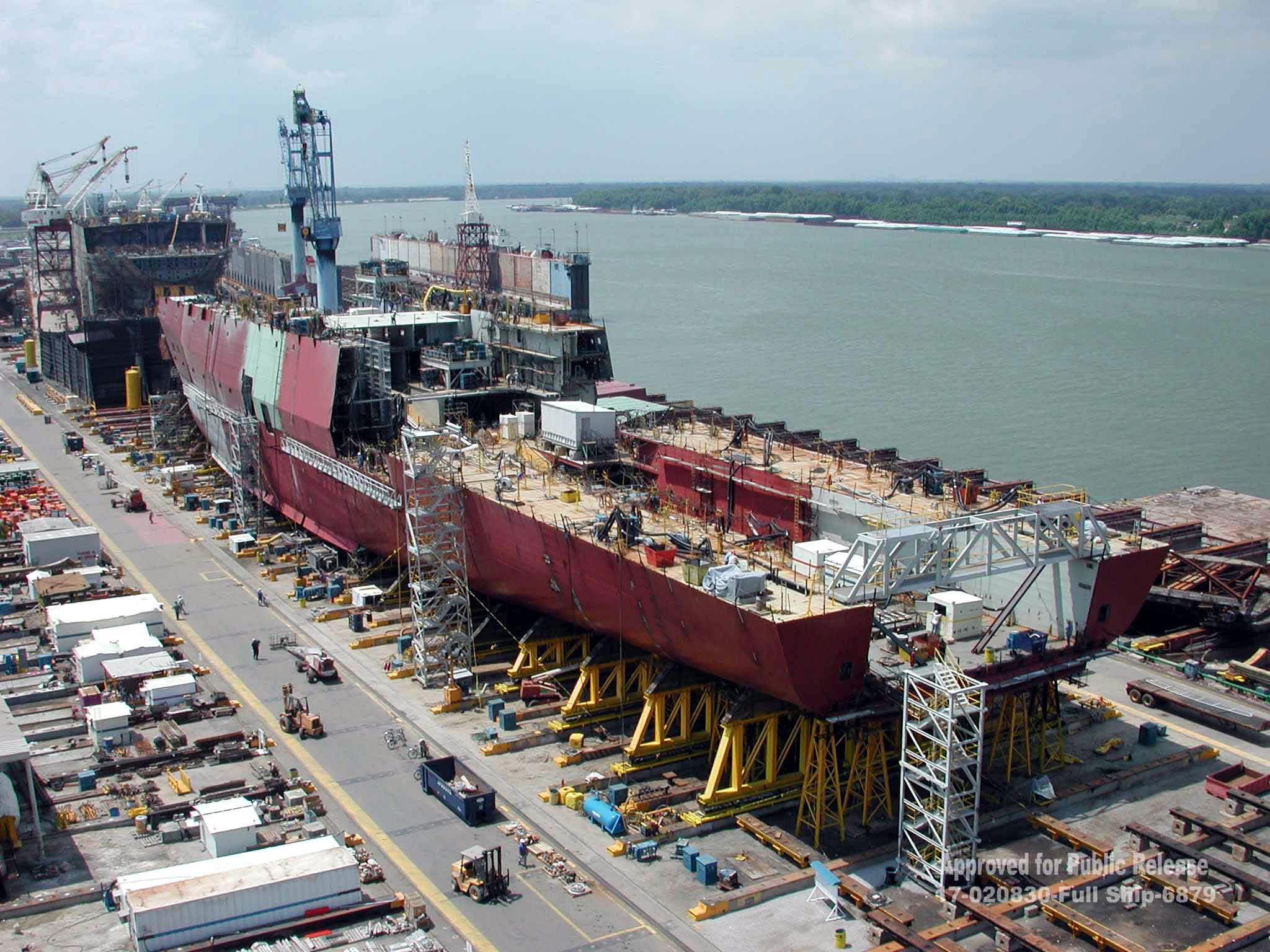
USS San Antonio during construction at Avondale, 2002

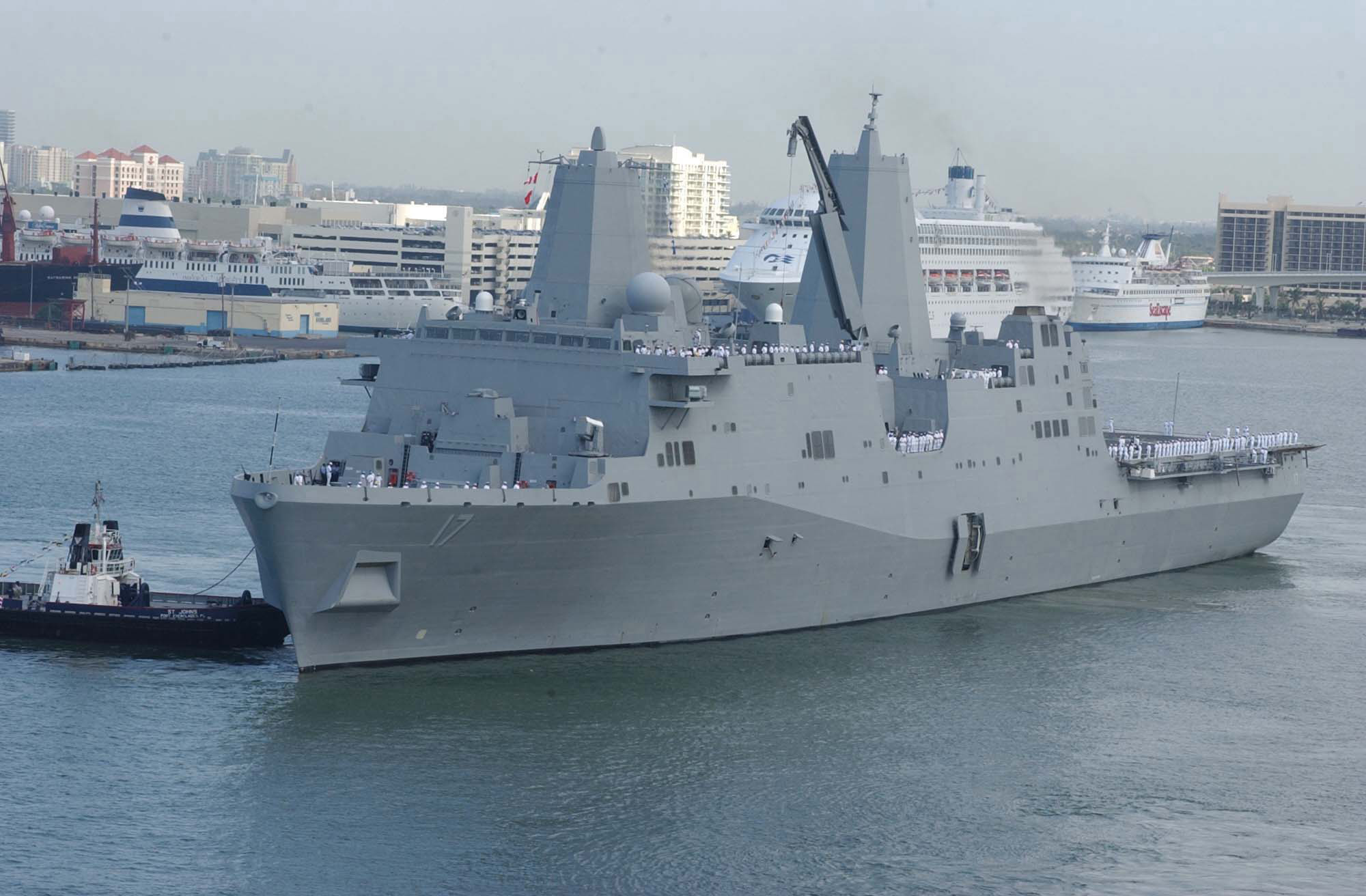
Port-bow view of USS San Antonio.

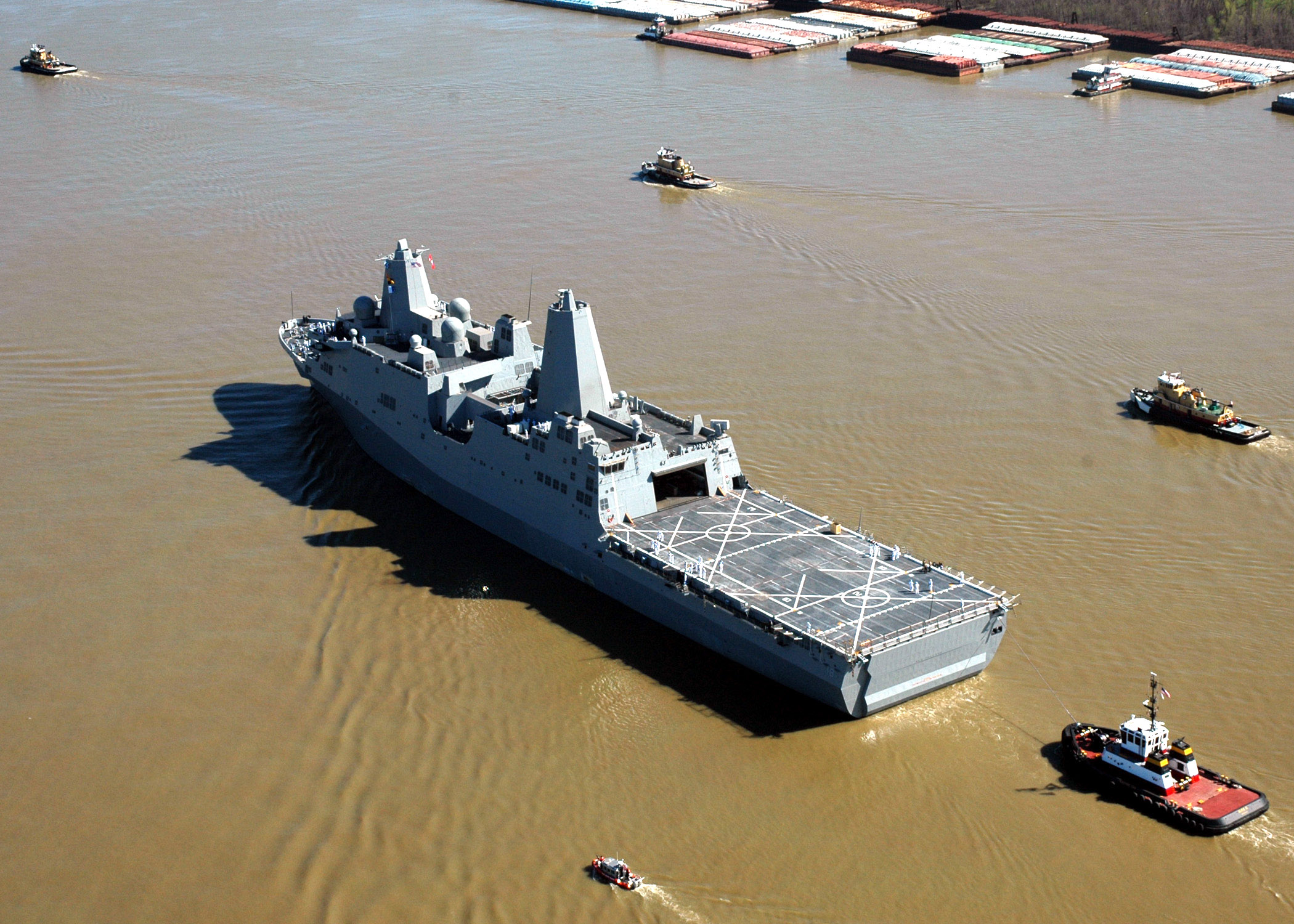
Port-quarter view of USS New Orleans.

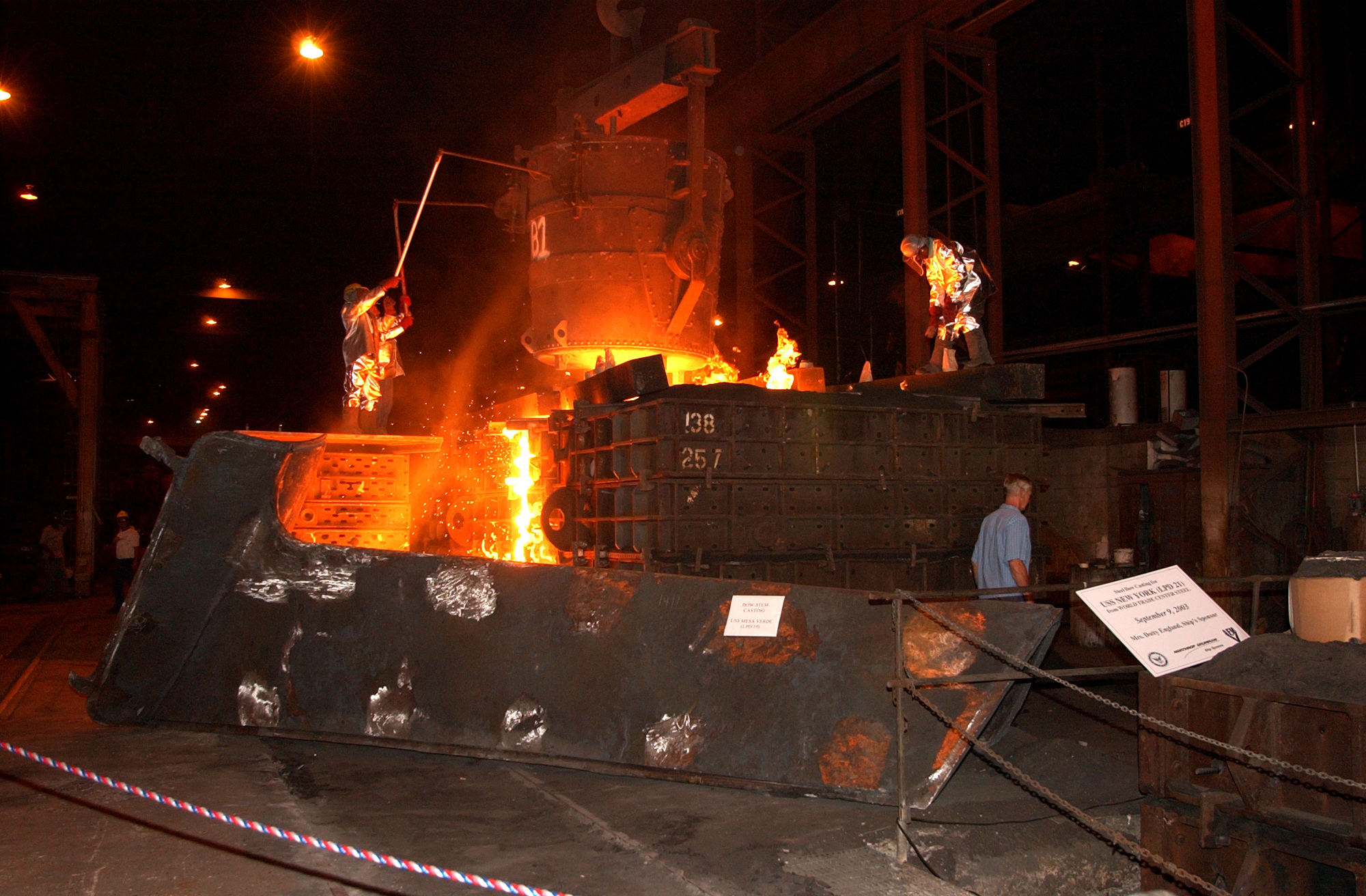
Steel from the World Trade Center is poured for construction of USS New York

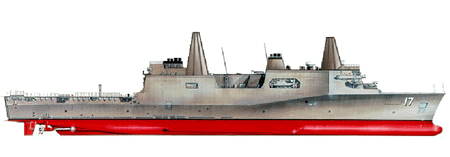
Elevation of LPD-17-class ship.

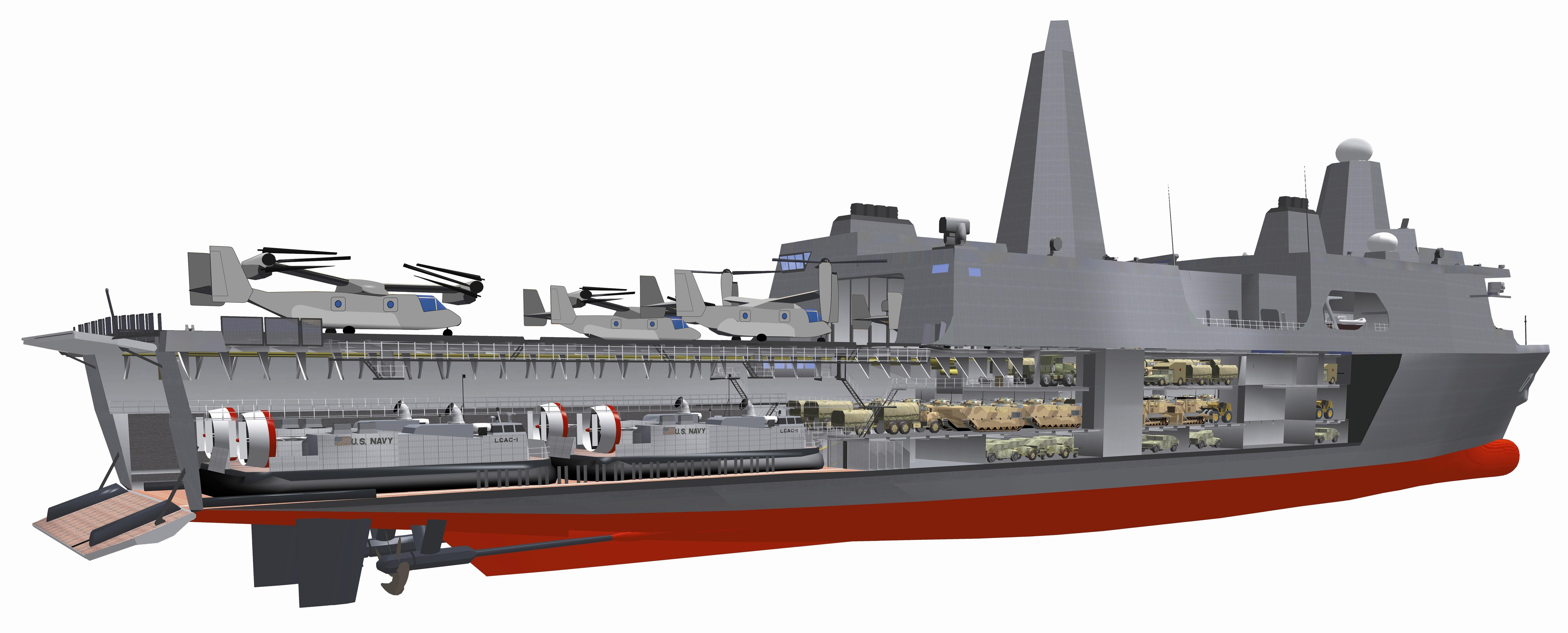
Cutaway illustration of the U.S. Navy's San Antonio-class amphibious transport dock ship (LPD).
