= USS Harrisburg (LPD-30) =

San Antonio-class amphibious transport dock

USS Harrisburg (LPD 30)
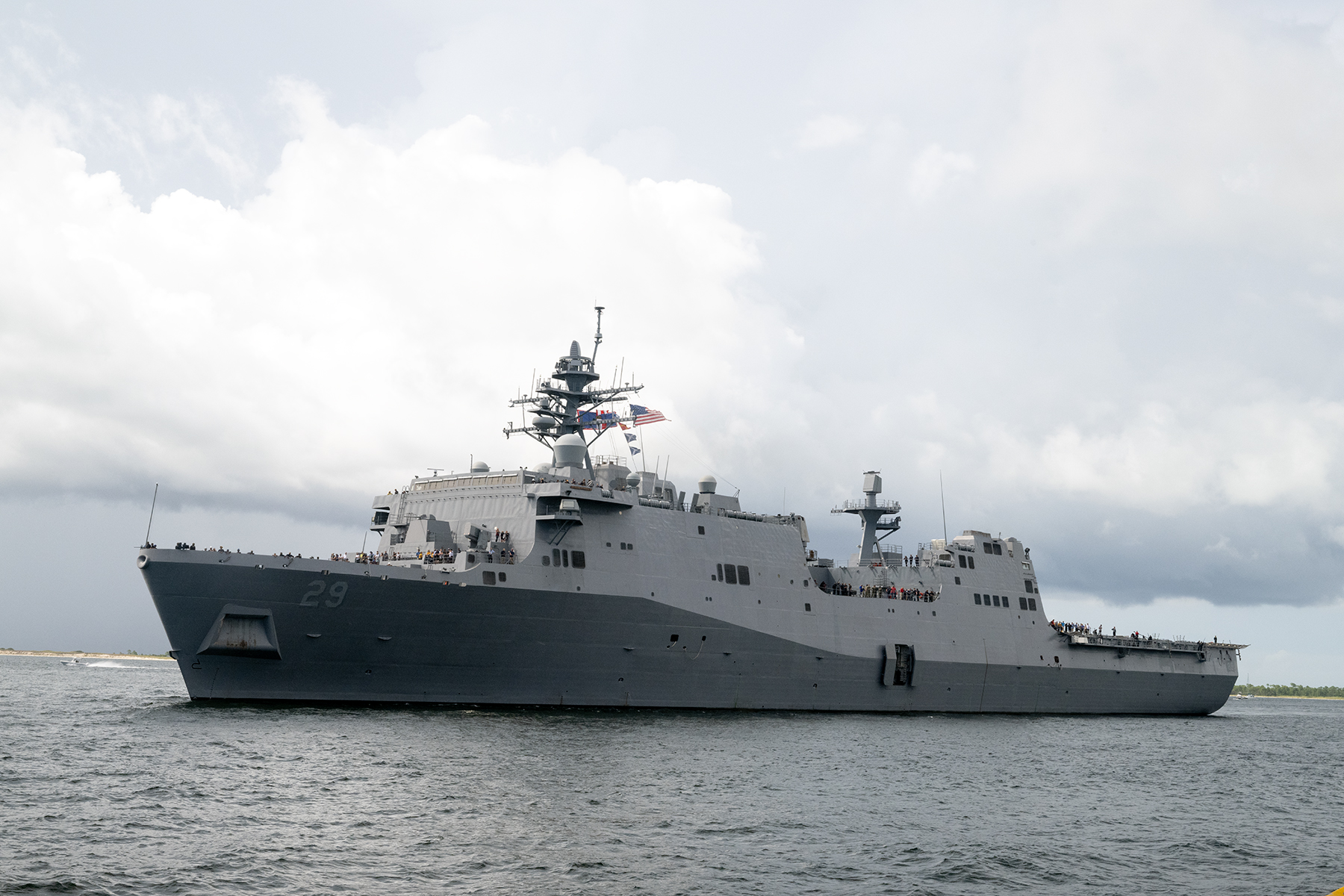
- Harrisburg's sister ship USS Richard M. McCool Jr.

History

United States
- Name: Harrisburg
- Namesake: Harrisburg
- Awarded: 26 March 2019
- Builder: Ingalls Shipbuilding
- Laid down: 28 January 2022
- Launched: 5 October 2024
- Sponsored by: Alexandra Curry
- Christened: 11 January 2025
- Commissioned: Est. Summer 2027
- Identification: Hull number: LPD 30
- Motto: Let Justice Be Done
- Status: Under construction
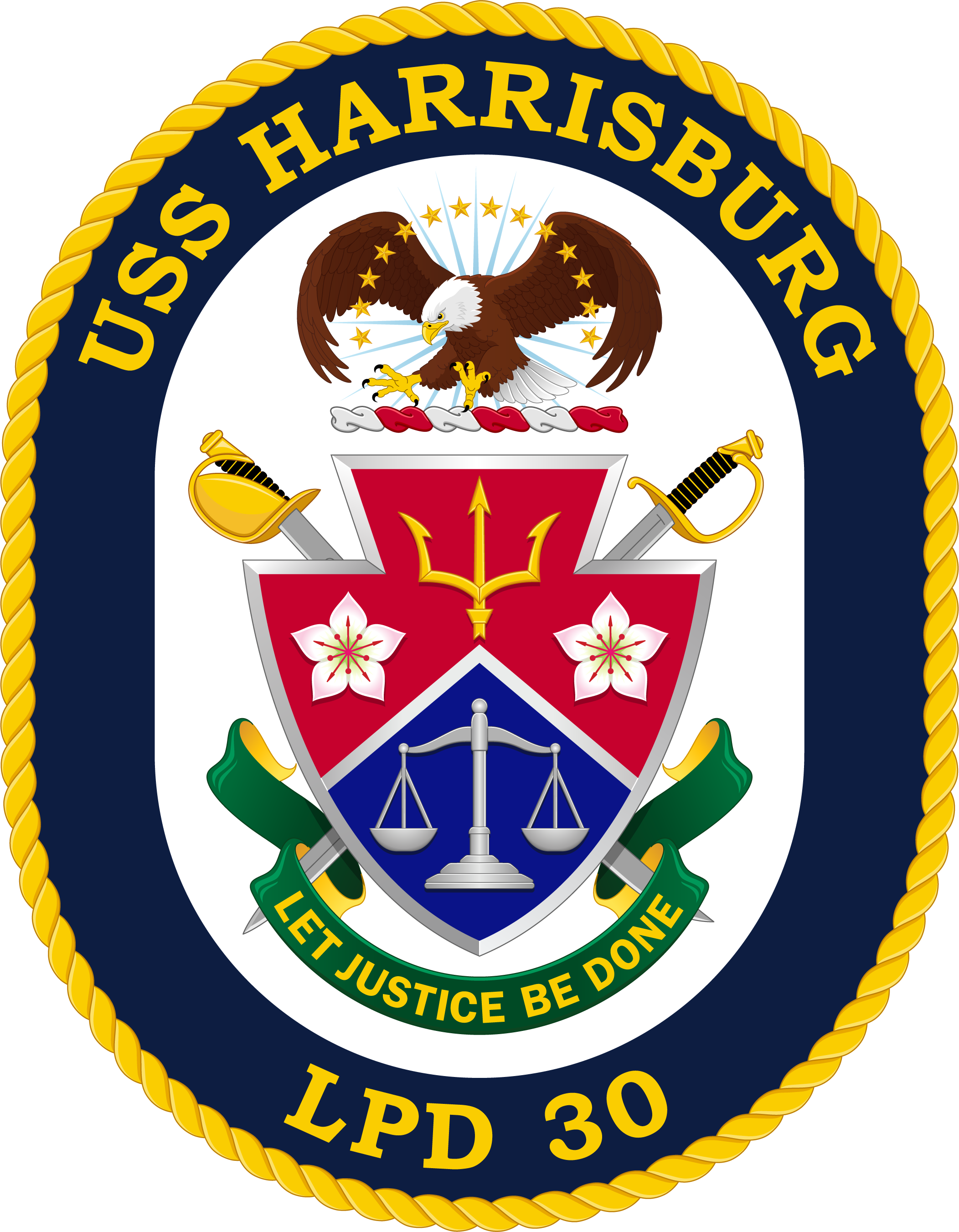
- Badge

General characteristics
- Class & type: San Antonio-class amphibious transport dock
- Displacement: 25,000 tons full
- Length: 208.5 m (684 ft) overall; 201.4 m (661 ft) waterline
- Beam: 31.9 m (105 ft) extreme; 29.5 m (97 ft) waterline
- Draft: 7 m (23 ft)
- Propulsion: Four Colt-Pielstick diesel engines, two shafts, 40,000 hp (30 MW)
- Speed: 22 knots (41 km/h)
- Boats & landing craft carried: 2 x LCACs (air cushion) or; 1 x LCU (conventional)
- Capacity: 699 (66 officers, 633 enlisted); surge to 800 total.
- Complement: 28 officers, 333 enlisted
- Armament: 2 x 30 mm Bushmaster II cannons, for surface threat defense; 2 x Rolling Airframe Missile launchers for air defense
- Aircraft carried: Two MV-22 tilt rotor aircraft may be launched or recovered simultaneously.

USS Harrisburg (LPD-30) will be the 14th San Antonio-class amphibious transport dock ship of the United States Navy. She will be the second ship in naval service named after the city of Harrisburg, Pennsylvania. Harrisburg is being built at Pascagoula, Mississippi, by Ingalls Shipbuilding. The ship will be the first Flight II variant of the San Antonio-class.
