= Harpers Ferry-class dock landing ship =

US class of dock landing ships

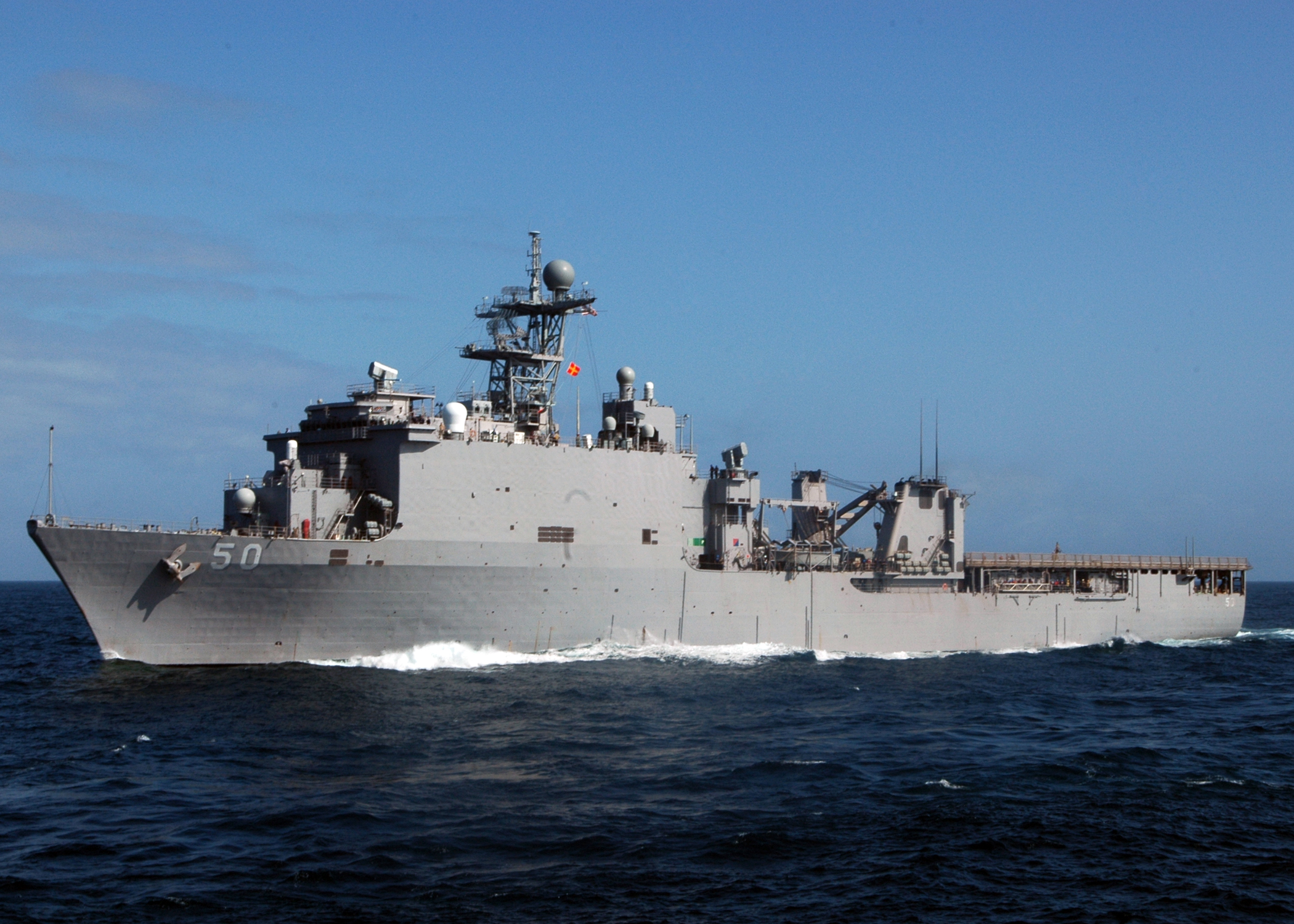
- USS Carter Hall

Class overview
- Name: Harpers Ferry class
- Builders: Avondale Shipyard
- Operators: United States Navy
- Preceded by: Whidbey Island class
- Succeeded by: LX(R) class
- Cost: $324.2 million
- In commission: 1995–present
- Planned: 4
- Completed: 4
- Active: 4

General characteristics
- Type: Dock landing ship
- Displacement: 15,939 tons
- Length: 609 ft 7 in (185.8 m)
- Beam: 84 ft (26 m)
- Draft: 19 ft 6 in (5.94 m)
- Propulsion: Four Colt Pielstick, 16-cylinder diesels twin turbo, two shafts, 33,000 shp (25,000 kW)
- Speed: 24.5 kn (45.4 km/h; 28.2 mph)
- Boats & landing craft carried: 2 LCACs or 1 LCU or four LCM-8 or 9 LCM-6
- Complement: 24 officers, 397 enlisted sailors, Surge + 504 Marines
- Armament: 2 × 25 mm Mk 38 cannons; 2 × 20 mm Phalanx CIWS mounts; 2 × RIM-116 Rolling Airframe Missile (RAM) launchers; 6 × .50 caliber M2HB machine guns

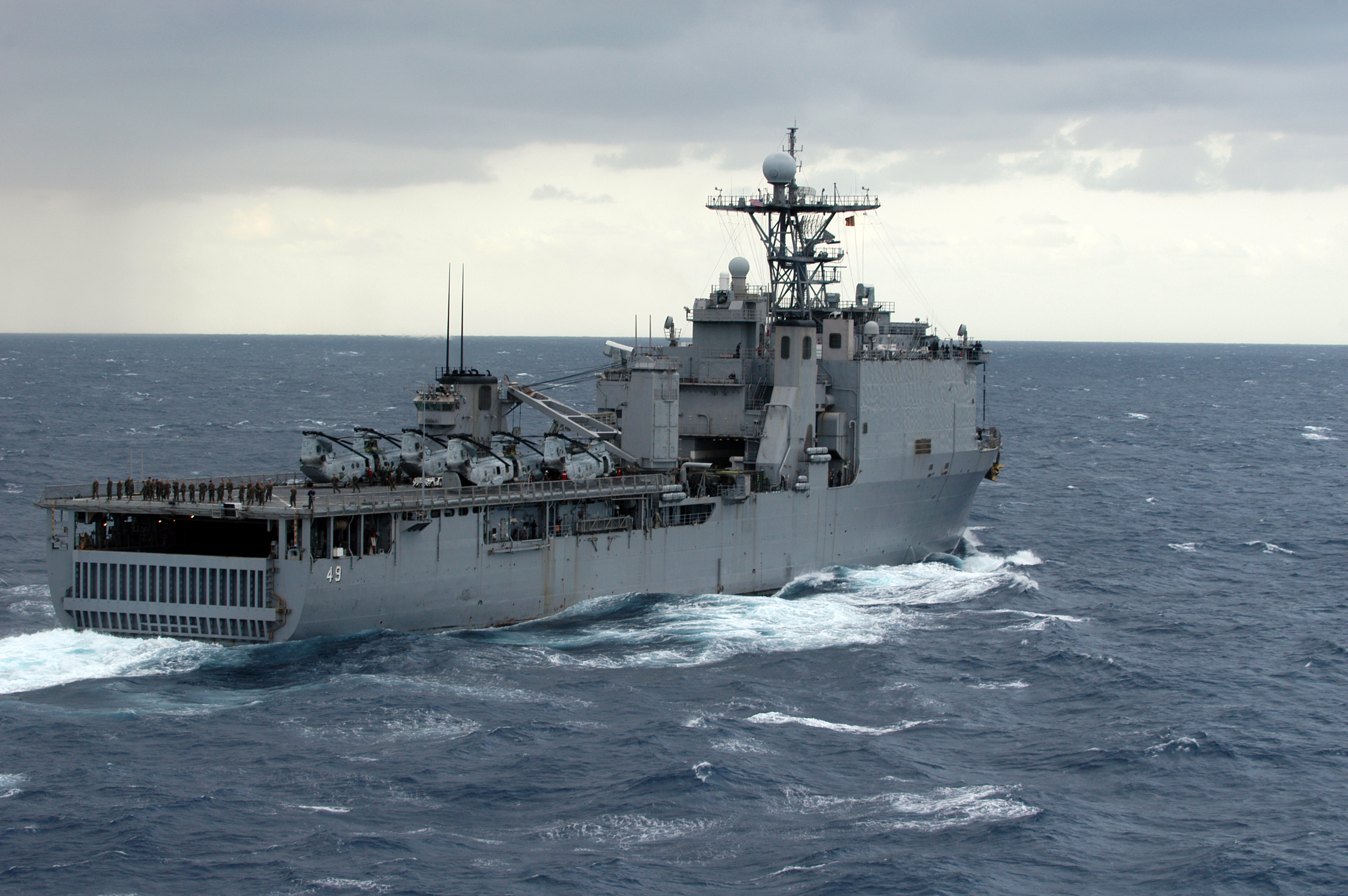
Stern view of USS Harpers Ferry

The Harpers Ferry class of the United States Navy is a class of dock landing ships completed in the early 1990s. Modified from the Whidbey Island class, the design sacrifices landing craft capacity for more cargo space, making it closer to an amphibious transport dock type, but was not designated as such. Externally, the two classes can be distinguished by the positions of weapons: The Harpers Ferry class has the Phalanx CIWS mounted forward, and the RAM launcher on top of the bridge, while the Whidbey Island has the opposite arrangement.

As of 2009, all ships of the class were scheduled to undergo a midlife upgrade to ensure they remain in service through 2038. The ships were upgraded each year through 2013, and the last ship was modernized in 2014. In 2009, ships homeported on the East Coast underwent upgrades at Metro Machine Corp., and ships based on the West Coast received upgrades at General Dynamics National Steel and Shipbuilding Company in San Diego.

Major elements of the upgrade package include diesel engine improvements, fuel and maintenance savings systems, engineering control systems, increased air conditioning/chill water capacity, and replacement of air compressors. The ships also replaced steam systems with all-electric functionality that will decrease maintenance.

== Harpers Ferry–class ships ==
Ship Name	Hull No.	Builder	Laid Down	Launched	Commissioned	Homeport	Status
Harpers Ferry	LSD-49	Avondale Shipyard	15 April 1991	16 January 1993	7 January 1995	Naval Base San Diego (CA)	Active
Carter Hall	LSD-50	Avondale Shipyard	11 November 1991	2 October 1993	30 September 1995	Naval Amphibious Base Little Creek (VA)	Active
Oak Hill	LSD-51	Avondale Shipyard	21 September 1992	11 June 1994	8 June 1996	Naval Amphibious Base Little Creek (VA)	Active
Pearl Harbor	LSD-52	Avondale Shipyard	27 January 1995	24 February 1996	30 May 1998	Naval Base San Diego (CA)	Active

== See also ==
Equivalent amphibious warfare ships of the same era

- Rotterdam class
- Albion class
- Galicia class
- Foudre class
- Ōsumi class

== Sources ==
- US Navy Type Information
- Hutchinson, R. (2002) Jane's Warship Recognition Guide HarperCollins: London, New York.
