= Stability conditions =

Standard loading conditions to which watercraft are subjected

The stability conditions of watercraft are the various standard loading configurations to which a ship, boat, or offshore platform may be subjected. They are recognized by classification societies such as Det Norske Veritas, Lloyd's Register and American Bureau of Shipping (ABS). Classification societies follow rules and guidelines laid down by International Convention for the Safety of Life at Sea (SOLAS) conventions, the International Maritime Organization and laws of the country under which the vessel is flagged, such as the Code of Federal Regulations.

Stability is normally broken into two distinct types: intact and damaged.

== Intact stability ==
The vessel is in normal operational configuration. The hull is not breached in any compartment. The vessel will be expected to meet various stability criteria such as GMt (metacentric height), area under the GZ (righting lever) curve, range of stability, trim, etc.

=== Intact conditions ===
==== Lightship or Light Displacement ====
The vessel is complete and ready for service in every respect, including permanent ballast, spare parts, lubricating oil, and working stores but is without fuel, cargo, drinking or washing water, officers, crew, passengers, their effects, temporary ballast or any other variable load.

==== Full load departure or full displacement ====
Along with all the Lightship loads, the vessel has all systems charged meaning that all fresh water, cooling, lubricating, hydraulic and fuel service header tanks, piping and equipment systems are filled with their normal operating fluids. Crew and effects are at their normal values. Consumables (provisions, potable water and fuel) are at 100% capacity. Ammunition and/or cargo is at maximum capacity. The vessel is at its limiting draft or legal load line.

==== Standard condition ====
This is only for military vessels. Along with all the Lightship loads, the vessel has all systems charged meaning that all fresh water, cooling, lubricating, hydraulic and fuel service header tanks, piping and equipment systems are filled with their normal operating fluids. Crew and effects are at their normal values. Consumables (provisions, potable water and fuel) are at 50% capacity. Ammunition and/or cargo is at 100% capacity. This condition is normally used for range and speed calculations.

==== Light arrival ====
Along with all the Lightship loads, the vessel has all systems charged meaning that all fresh water, cooling, lubricating, hydraulic and fuel service header tanks, piping and equipment systems are filled with their normal operating fluids. Crew and effects are at their normal values. Consumables (provisions, potable water and fuel) are at 10% full load. Ammunition and/or cargo is at 100% capacity.

== Damaged stability ==
The vessel in the assessed "Worst Intact Condition" is analytically damaged by opening various combinations of watertight compartments to the sea. The number of compartments and their location are dictated by IMO regulations, SOLAS conventions, or other applicable rules. Typically these conditions are identified by the compartment(s) damaged ex: "Hold #3 and Water Ballast Tank 4 Port"

== See also ==
- Naval architecture
- Hull (watercraft)
- Society of Naval Architects and Marine Engineers
- Ship stability
- Displacement (ship)
