= Sevastopol (disambiguation) =

Sevastopol is a port city in Crimea.

Sevastopol may also refer to:

== Places ==
- Sevastopol, Indiana, an unincorporated community in the US
- Sevastopol, Wisconsin, a town in the US
- 2121 Sevastopol, a main-belt binary asteroid discovered in 1971

== Ships ==
- Russian ironclad Sevastopol, an armored frigate that was converted to an ironclad while under construction
- Russian battleship Sevastopol (1895), a Petropavlovsk-class pre-dreadnought battleship scuttled during the Russo-Japanese War of 1904–1905
- Russian battleship Sevastopol (1911), a Gangut-class battleship that participated in World War I and World War II before she was scrapped in 1949
- Russian battlecruiser Sevastopol (1939), a Soviet Kronshtadt-class battlecruiser that was never completed
- Russian amphibious assault ship Sevastopol, a Mistral-class amphibious assault ship, ultimately sold instead to Egypt in 2016 as ENS Anwar El Sadat

== Other uses ==
- Sevastopol Sketches or Sevastopol, a book by Leo Tolstoy
- "Sevastopol", a 2011 song by Moby from Destroyed
- "Sevastopol", a 2010 song by Heaven Shall Burn from Invictus (Iconoclast III)
- Sevastopol, a fictional space station in the 2014 video game Alien: Isolation
- Sevastopol, a fictional Russian submarine in Mission: Impossible – Dead Reckoning Part One and its sequel The Final Reckoning

== See also ==
- Battle for Sevastopol, a 2015 Ukrainian-Russian film about Lyudmila Pavlichenko
- Defence of Sevastopol, a 1911 Russian film about the Siege of Sevastopol
- Russian ship Sevastopol, a list of Russian naval warships
- Sebastopol (disambiguation)
- Sevastopolsky (disambiguation)
- Siege of Sevastopol (disambiguation)
