= Amphibious Assault Ship Project =

Canadian naval procurement plan

The Amphibious Assault Ship Project was a proposed procurement project by the Government of Canada for the Royal Canadian Navy (RCN). However, no such project was incorporated into the Government's defence plan Strong, Secure and Engaged released in 2017 and cost challenges with other naval procurement projects under the National Shipbuilding Procurement Strategy led to no movement on the idea until some renewed interest in late 2025.

This idea came about as part of the development of the Joint Support Ship Project of the Royal Canadian Navy and the need to improve the strategic sealift and amphibious assault capability of the Canadian Forces. Many of the capabilities required for strategic sealift were to be included in the Joint Support Ship Project, however, a dedicated amphibious assault ship was favoured by some, such as then Chief of the Defence Staff Rick Hillier.

By late 2008, the project appeared to have been placed on hold, if not cancelled. By 2013 the project was again being discussed as the result of a proposal made by the Thales (DCNS) to provide the Mistral-class amphibious assault ship design. In mid-2014, both DCNS and SNC Lavalin offered three ships at a cost CAD$2.6 billion (2 billion euro). SNC Lavalin proposed to construct the vessels, while DCNS would design them and STX France would consolidate the hulls for arctic operations. The Royal Canadian Navy also trained with the French Navy on a Thales-built amphibious assault ship. However, the project was abandoned due to budget constraints.

== Background ==
In 2005 Chief of Defence Staff, General Rick Hillier and Director of Maritime Requirements, Captain (N) Peter Ellis told the Standing Committee on National Defence in the House of Commons that the Canadian Forces required strategic sealift capacity for operations in the 21st century. The Minister of National Defence at that time, David Pratt, was directly involved in several major procurement projects totaling $7.0 billion including the Joint Support Ship Project and what became the Amphibious Assault Ship Project, declaring that in the next decade the Canadian Forces must expect to engage in the sort of operations it has experienced over the past decade.

== Concept ==
According to the Direction générale de l'Armement (DGA), as well as the French newspaper La Tribune, the Royal Canadian Navy had shown "strong interest" in purchasing two Mistral-class amphibious assault landing helicopter dock (LHD) from France. A Mistral-class ship can carry a significantly large military force with equipment and vehicles in "fighting order", enabling the Canadian Forces to face armed opposition ashore.

As conceived, the Amphibious Assault Ship Project envisioned a ship that could carry personnel and equipment that could rapidly disembark in waves using landing craft and/or helicopters such as the CH-47 Chinook. The ship would be able to disembark personnel and equipment, and support to them in the face of armed opposition. The warship could also be used in support of humanitarian operations since it would have a large hospital on board designed for treating combat casualties. The ship will be able to carry a battalion-size able to conduct noncombatant evacuation operation around the world.

The Canadian Alliance Party had issued a call for procuring four "support / amphibious ships, at least one dedicated helicopter / light carrier". First considered in the year 2000, whether the Amphibious Assault Ship Project ever made it to the design stage is still unclear. The Royal Canadian Military Institute had proposed to obtain four ships similar to the British Bay-class landing ship dock.

=== Aircraft ===
As with any amphibious assault ship, a possible Canadian amphibious assault ship would be expected to carry a number of transport helicopters as well as aircraft for possible offensive and defensive roles. The staff of the Canadian Forces had requested that the ship be capable of carrying a minimum of six attack helicopters along with seventeen medium helicopters or 12 heavy-lift helicopters. In 2003, Major General (ret.) Lewis MacKenzie declared that Canada must consider buying the aircraft carrier-capable version of the F-35 Lightning II.

== Mistral-class concept rejection ==
In 2014 the Department of Defence looked at the possibility of acquiring two already complete Mistral-class amphibious assault ships from France. These vessels had been originally ordered by Russia in 2010 but the delivery was halted following the illegal annexation and occupation of Crimea by Russia. As a result France began looking for other potential buyers including Canada and Egypt. After an examination process and several training cruises on the vessels, in 2015 the Deputy Defence Minister John Forster advised Defence Minister Jason Kenney not to go ahead with the purchase. Forster cited how the purchase and operating costs of the vessels would stress resources on the already over budget $39 billion National Shipbuilding Procurement Strategy. Due to the negative impact it would have on the construction on other vessels needed to replace Canada's aging surface combat fleet, the Department of National Defence withdrew interest in purchasing the vessels. The two Mistral vessels would end up being sold to the Egyptian Navy in 2015 becoming ENS Anwar El Sadat and ENS Gamal Abdel Nasser.

== Possibility of an Arctic amphibious capability ==
In December 2025, the Canadian Broadcasting Corporation reported that the RCN was looking at the possibility of recommending the purchase of amphibious ships that could operate in Canada's Arctic waters and elsewhere. Such vessels might be equipped with both helicopters and landing craft, likely hovercraft. No recommendation had yet been made to the government. The purchase of a vessel similar to the theoretical, LPD-like landing platform Arctic (LPA) or the simpler landing ship infantry (Arctic) (LSI(A)) has been floated by independent observers. Later during 2026 Vice-Admiral Topshee, then Commander of the RCN, commented further on such a purchase. His key points were:

- "The RCN is currently at the conceptualization, identification and options analysis phase of the procurement process. This includes identifying whether other options exist to meet the key requirements.
- There is no formal capital equipment project yet.
- Therefore, no firm timeline has been identified.
- The envisioned vessel would be used to support the army and allow it to operate/intervene anywhere in the world, with the priority being in Canada's Arctic.
- A primary purpose for the vessel would be to provide sustained humanitarian assistance/disaster relief throughout the year, even during the Arctic winter.
- The implications of such a vessel on the remainder of the Canadian Armed Forces (CAF) (army, air force and special operations forces) need to be determined.
- The combat amphibious approach envisioned is the "British one" – landing where the enemy is not – rather than the "American one" – being able to conduct opposed landings.
- From these requirements, the navy envisions a Polar Class 2 vessel that is similar to the Netherlands navy’s Rotterdam-class landing platform dock (LPD), that has a strong air component including: helicopters and UAVs; and surface connectors (landing craft, floats, etc.) that can move supplies to shore.
- The supply requirement means that a well-deck-like capability is essential in order to be independent of the need for port infrastructure, but perhaps with side access in order to optimize the vessel’s stern for ice breaking.
- The vessel would have self-defence weaponry only.
- The ability of the Canada's shipyards to build the vessel must still be determined. However, Vice-Admiral Topshee thinks that among the three relevant shipyards, the capacity likely exists."

== See also ==
- Joint Support Ship Project
- Marine Commando Regiment
- List of amphibious warfare ships
