= Sebastopolis =

Sebastopolis (Ancient Greek: Σεβαστόπολις or Σεβαστούπολις) may refer to:

- Sebastopolis in Caria, a town of ancient Caria, now in Turkey
- Sebastopolis in Colchis, a former name of Sukhumi, Georgia
- Sebastopolis in Mysia, a former name of Sandarlik, Turkey
- Sebastopolis in Pontus near Sulusaray, Turkey
- Sebastopolis in Thrace, a former city in Turkey
- Sevastopol, a city in Crimea

== See also ==
- Sebaste (disambiguation) (several cities & episcopal sees)
- Sebastopol (disambiguation)
- Sevastopol (disambiguation)
