= ENS Gamal Abdel Nasser =

Egyptian Navy amphibious assault ship

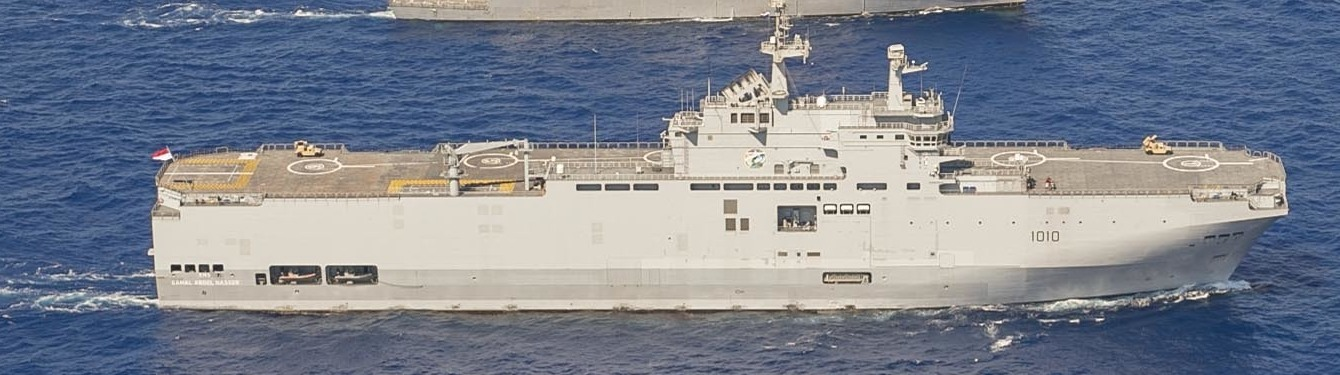
- ENS Gamal Abdel Nasser in 2022

Russia
- Name: Vladivostok
- Ordered: June 2011
- Builder: STX France Chantiers de l'Atlantique shipyard, Saint-Nazaire, France; United Shipbuilding Corporation Baltiysky Zavod shipyard, St. Petersburg, Russia
- Laid down: 1 February 2012
- Launched: 15 October 2013
- Status: Sea trials completed, Contract cancelled

Egypt
- Name: Gamal Abdel Nasser
- Namesake: Gamal Abdel Nasser
- Acquired: 23 September 2015
- Commissioned: 2 June 2016
- Home port: Safaga, Egypt
- Identification: MMSI number: 622121040; Callsign: SUAJ; Hull number: L1010; Deck Code: GN
- Status: In service

General characteristics
- Class & type: Mistral-class amphibious assault ship
- Displacement: 16,500 tonnes (empty); 21,300 tonnes (full load); 32,300 tonnes (with ballasts)
- Length: 200 m (660 ft)
- Beam: 32 m (105 ft)
- Draught: 6.3 m (21 ft)
- Installed power: 3 × Wärtsilä 16V32 (3 × 6,200 kW (8,300 hp))
- Speed: 18.8 knots (34.8 km/h; 21.6 mph)
- Range: 10,800 km (5,800 nmi) at 18 knots (33 km/h; 21 mph); 19,800 kilometres (10,700 nmi) at 15 knots (28 km/h; 17 mph)
- Armament: 4 × AN/TWQ-1 Avenger mobile SAM (32 FIM-92 Stinger missiles)
- Aircraft carried: 2 unmanned helicopters Schiebel Camcopter S-100
- Aviation facilities: Helicopter deck and hangar

ENS Gamal Abdel Nasser (L1010) is an Egyptian Navy amphibious assault ship, a type of helicopter carrier, of the French-designed Mistral class. She was originally built for the Russian Navy and underwent sea trials. Subsequently, the contract was cancelled by France and an agreement on compensation was reached with the Russian government. Egypt and France concluded the deal to acquire the two former Russian Mistral for roughly 950 million euros.

== History ==
The Russian government placed an order for the ship in 2011. The construction of the ship would be shared between the countries with France building about 60 percent and Russia 40. Work started in France, in Saint-Nazaire, on 1 February 2012 and in the Russian Baltiysky Zavod shipyard in St. Petersburg in October 2012. Russia would send her parts to France for final assembly. The ship was expected to join the Russian Navy in 2015. The ship was launched on 15 October 2013. The ship began her first sea trials on 5 March 2014.

Savings in construction costs were anticipated, due to the use of commercial off the shelf parts, rather than requiring every system to be designed to military standards.

The Russian acquisition of French Mistral-class amphibious assault ships was considered to be the largest defense deal between Russia and the West since World War II.

The 2014 Russian military intervention in Ukraine triggered rising international criticism. France was under political pressure from other nations to sanction Russia by cancelling or suspending delivery of the two Mistral-class vessels.

On 3 September 2014, French President François Hollande released an announcement that France was suspending the delivery of Vladivostok to Russia due to the ongoing War in Donbas.

By 13 September 2014, a partial ceasefire was in place in Ukraine. This improvement in conditions in Ukraine was sufficient for French authorities to allow Vladivostok to go to sea for her acceptance trials. French Defence Ministry sources said a decision on the delivery of Vladivostok would be taken by mid-November. On 25 November, it was announced that delivery of the two ships was to be postponed indefinitely. Russia threatened legal action over the postponement. In August 2015 the two governments reached agreement on terms for cancelling the contract; France would keep the ships and fully reimburse Russia.

On 7 August 2015, a French diplomatic source confirmed that President Hollande discussed the matter with Egyptian President Abdel Fattah el-Sisi during his visit to Egypt during the inauguration of the New Suez Canal in Ismailia. Subsequently, Egypt and France concluded the deal to acquire the two former Russian Mistral for roughly 950 million euros, including the costs of training Egyptian crews. Speaking on RMC Radio, Jean-Yves Le Drian, French Defence Minister, said that Egypt had already paid the whole price for the helicopter carriers.

On 2 June 2016, DCNS delivered the ex-Vladivostok, renamed Gamal Abdel Nasser. The flag transfer ceremony took place in the presence of Egyptian and French Navies' Chiefs of Staff, Admiral Rabie and Admiral Rogel, Hervé Guillou, chairman and chief executive officer of DCNS, Laurent Castaing, chairman and chief executive officer of STX France, and senior Egyptian and French officials. Before sailing to Alexandria, the ship participated in a joint exercise between the Egyptian and French Navies. On 16 September 2016, DCNS delivered the second ship Anwar El Sadat which also participated in a joint exercise with the French Navy before arriving at her home port of Alexandria.

== Aircraft ==
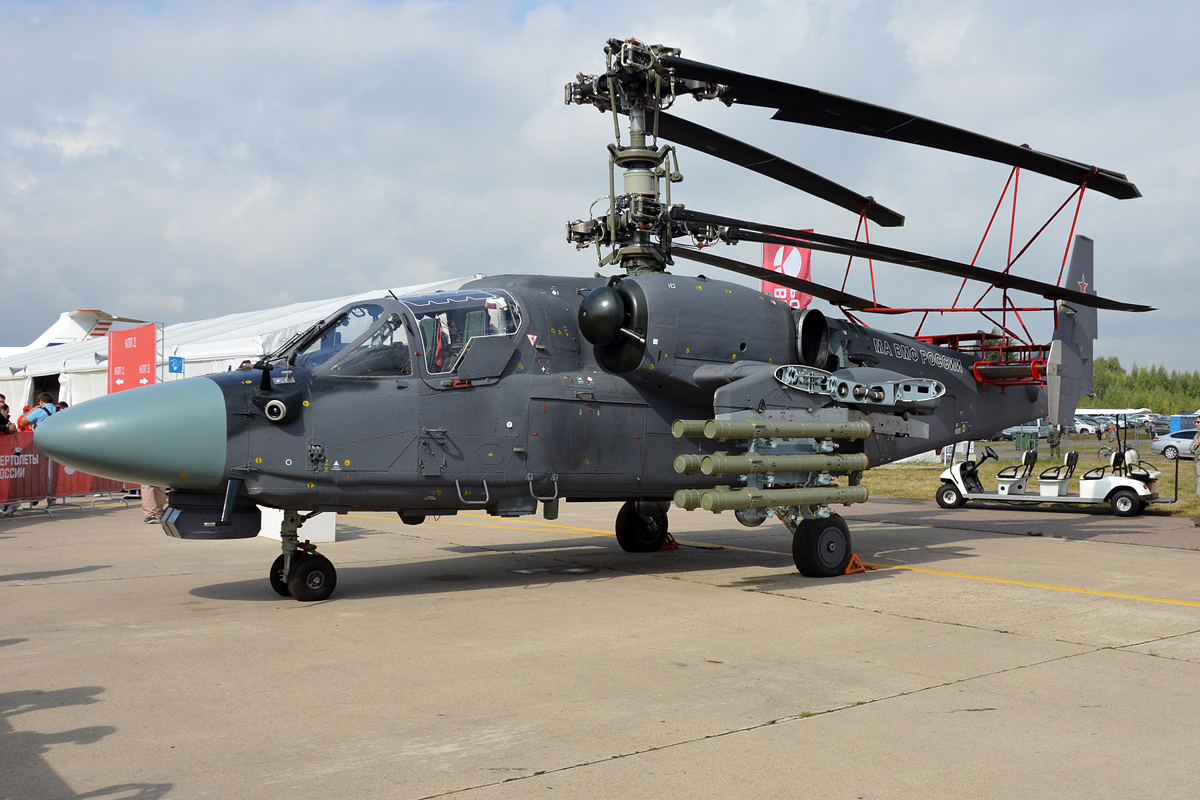
Ka-52K Katran, the ship-based attack helicopter is likely to serve on Egypt's Mistral carriers.

Since receiving its two Mistral-class carriers, Egypt had issued an international tender for the procurement of new maritime helicopters. The Egyptian Navy and Air Force studied several offers for helicopters to use on both carriers. European and Russian manufacturers entered the bidding procedure; NHIndustries and Airbus Helicopters were reported to have offered their NH90 and Tiger helicopters, while Russian Helicopters offered its Ka-52K helicopter. By May 2017, the tender had reached its final stage, Russian Helicopters stated that it would immediately enter into pricing negotiations if the company won the tender. In June 2017, Russia announced it had won the tender to provide Ka-52K helicopters. The head of the FSVTS, Dmitry Shugayev, said that pre-contract work was underway, including final agreement on the helicopter's technical concept and other financial conditions. Egypt is likely to buy the same package intended for the Russian Navy, which includes Ka-52K attack helicopters and Ka-29/31 utility helicopters, before the contract was cancelled by France.

== Military exercises ==
=== Cleopatra 2016 ===
In June 2016, Gamal Abdel Nasser took part in military exercises jointly conducted by the Egyptian and French navies in the Mediterranean Sea. The drills were held under the code name Cleopatra 2016 and lasted for several days, they were the first for the ship after being delivered to Egypt earlier that month. The exercises included a number of activities such as both forces planning and managing naval combat missions.
