= Russian ship Sevastopol =

At least six ships of the Imperial Russian Navy, Soviet Navy or Russian Navy have been named Sevastopol after the Siege of Sevastopol (1854–1855) or the city of the same name.

- Russian schooner Sevastopol (1815) - 14-gun schooner that was broken up after 1833.
- Russian ironclad Sevastopol - armored frigate that was converted to an ironclad while under construction
- Russian battleship Sevastopol (1895) - Petropavlovsk-class pre-dreadnought battleship scuttled during the Russo-Japanese War of 1904–1905
- Russian battleship Sevastopol (1911) - Gangut-class battleship that participated in World War I and World War II before she was scrapped in 1949
- Soviet cruiser Sevastopol - Kresta I-class cruiser launched in 1967 and scrapped in 1991.
- Russian amphibious assault ship Sevastopol - Mistral-class amphibious assault ship subsequently sold to Egypt before delivery.
