= ENS Anwar El Sadat =

Egyptian amphibious assault ship

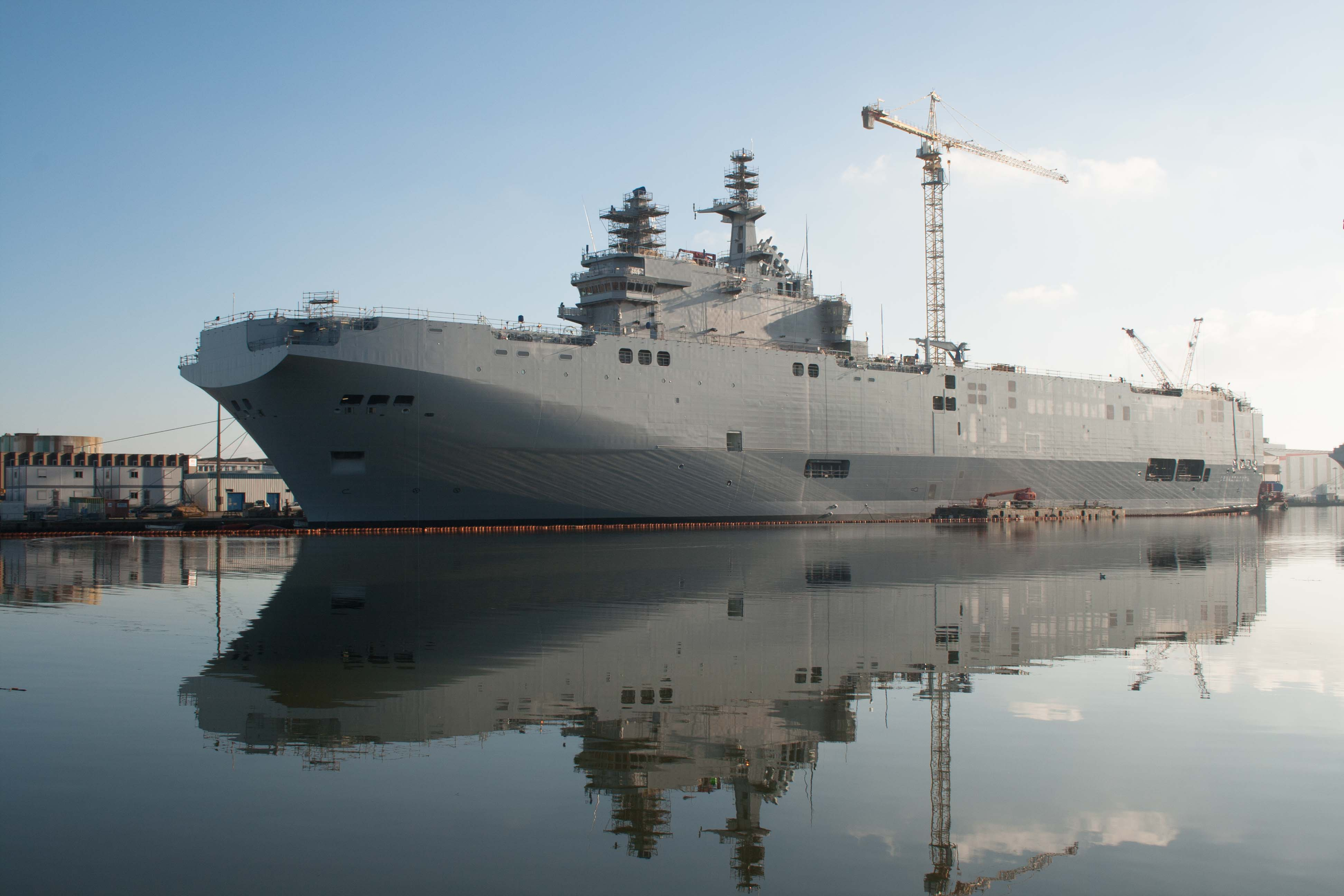
- Sevastopol fitting out in Saint-Nazaire, December 2014

History

Russia
- Name: Sevastopol
- Ordered: June 2011
- Builder: STX France Chantiers de l'Atlantique shipyard, Saint-Nazaire, France; United Shipbuilding Corporation Baltiysky Zavod shipyard, St. Petersburg, Russia
- Laid down: 18 June 2013
- Launched: 20 November 2014
- Status: Contract cancelled

Egypt
- Name: Anwar El Sadat
- Namesake: Anwar Sadat
- Acquired: 16 September 2016
- Home port: Alexandria
- Identification: MMSI number: 622121041; Callsign: SUPE; Hull number: L1020; Deck Code: AS
- Status: In service

General characteristics
- Class & type: Mistral-class amphibious assault ship
- Displacement: 16,500 tonnes (empty); 21,300 tonnes (full load); 32,300 tonnes (with ballasts)
- Length: 199 m (653 ft)
- Beam: 32 m (105 ft)
- Draught: 6.3 m (21 ft)
- Installed power: 3 × Wärtsilä 16V32 (3 × 6,200 kW (8,300 hp))
- Speed: 18.8 knots (34.8 km/h; 21.6 mph)
- Range: 10,800 km (5,800 nmi) at 18 knots (33 km/h; 21 mph); 19,800 kilometres (10,700 nmi) at 15 knots (28 km/h; 17 mph)
- Armament: 4 × AN/TWQ-1 Avenger mobile SAM (32 FIM-92 Stinger missiles)
- Aircraft carried: 2 unmanned helicopters Schiebel Camcopter S-100
- Aviation facilities: Helicopter deck and hangar

ENS Anwar El Sadat (L1020) is an Egyptian Navy amphibious assault ship, a type of helicopter carrier, of the French Mistral class. It was built in France originally for the Russian Navy as part of a contract for two of these warships and underwent sea trials. The contract with Russia was subsequently cancelled by France and an agreement on compensation was reached with the Russian government. Egypt and France eventually concluded a deal to acquire the two warships for roughly 950 million euros.

== History ==
The Russian government placed an order for this and another warship in 2011. The construction of these ships would be shared between both countries, with France building about 60 percent and Russia 40 percent. Work started in Saint-Nazaire, France, on 18 June 2013, and in the Russian Baltiysky Zavod shipyard in St. Petersburg on 4 July 2013. Russia would send its parts to France for final assembly. The ship was originally expected to join the Russian Navy in 2015. After final assembly of the main structures in France the ship was then scheduled to go to St. Petersburg, Russia, for the outfitting of additional Russian-specific weapons and subsystems.

The Russian acquisition of these two French Mistral-class amphibious assault ships was considered to be the largest defense deal between Russia and the West since World War II.

In 2014, as criticism of Russian intervention in Ukraine grew, France came under increasing pressure to cancel or suspend the delivery of the two Mistral-class hulls, tentatively named Vladivostok and Sevastopol. Some commentators suggested France try to find alternative customers for the two vessels. In August, 2015, the two governments reached agreement on terms for cancelling the contract; France would keep the ships and fully reimburse Russia.

On 7 August 2015, a French diplomatic source confirmed that President Hollande had discussed the matter with Egyptian President Abdel Fattah el-Sisi during his visit to Egypt for the inauguration of the New Suez Canal in Ismailia. Subsequently, in October 2015, Egypt and France concluded a deal to acquire the two formerly Russian-bound warships for roughly 950 million euros, which included the costs of training Egyptian crews. Speaking on RMC Radio, Jean-Yves Le Drian, French Defence Minister, said that Egypt had already paid the whole price for the helicopter carriers.

Beginning in February 2016, 180 Egyptian sailors began training in Saint-Nazaire, France, on the newly renamed landing helicopter dock Gamal Abdel Nasser, with the support of the DCNS (Direction des Constructions Navales Services) and STX France instructors and Défense Conseil International.

On 16 September 2016, DCNS delivered the Anwar El Sadat, which participated in a joint exercise with the French Navy before arriving at its home port of Alexandria on 6 October 2016, coinciding with the country's celebrations of the 43rd anniversary of the 1973 October War against Israel.

== Aircraft ==
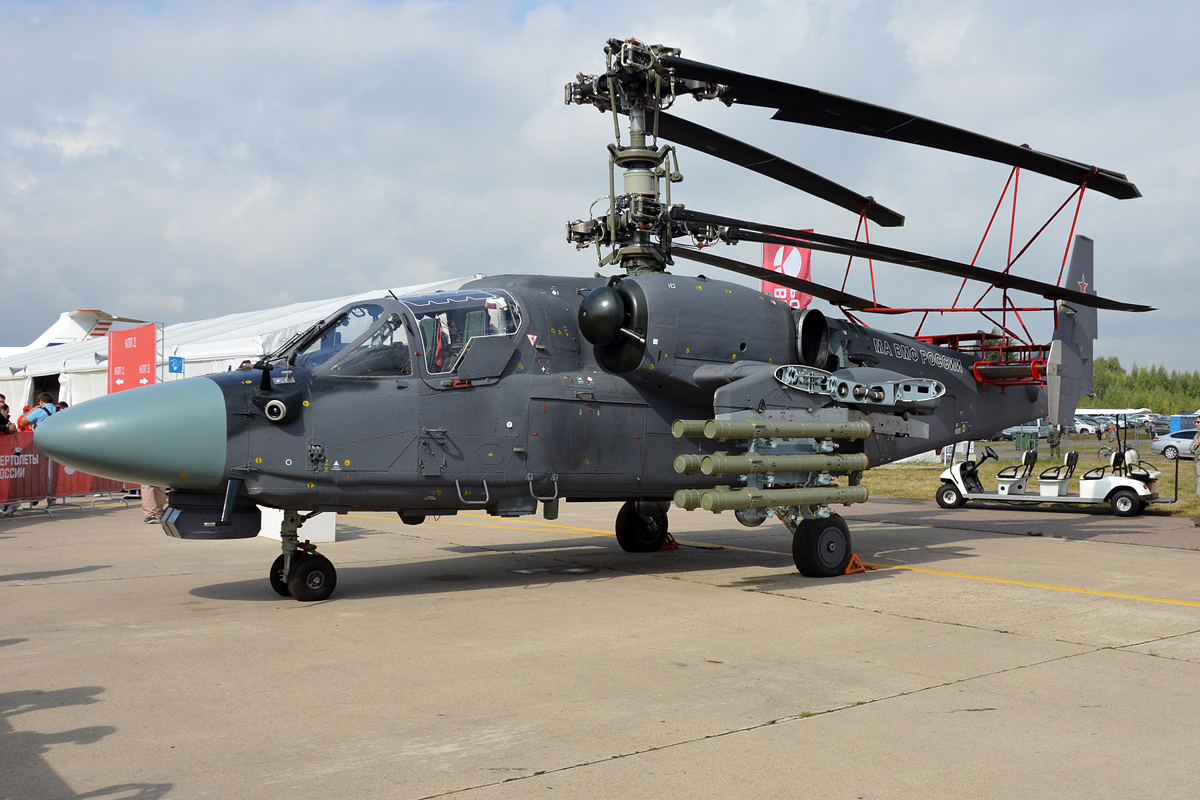
Ka-52K Katran, the ship-based attack helicopter likely to serve on Egypt's Mistral carriers

Since receiving its two Mistral-class carriers, Egypt had issued an international tender for the procurement of new maritime helicopters. The Egyptian Navy and Air Force studied several offers for helicopters to use on both carriers. European and Russian manufacturers entered the bidding procedure; NHIndustries and Airbus Helicopters were reported to have offered their NH90 and Tiger helicopters, while Russian Helicopters offered its Ka-52K helicopter. By May 2017, the tender had reached its final stage, Russian Helicopters stated that it would intermediary enter into pricing negotiations if the company won the tender. In June 2017, Russia announced it had won the tender for providing the Ka-52K. The head of the FSVTS, Dmitry Shugayev, said that pre-contract work was underway, including final agreement on the helicopter's technical concept and other financial conditions. Egypt is likely to buy the same package intended for the Russian Navy, which includes Ka-52K attack helicopters and Ka-29/31 utility helicopters, before the contract was cancelled by France.

== Military exercises ==
=== Cleopatra 2016/2 ===
In October 2016, Anwar El Sadat took part in military exercises jointly conducted by the Egyptian and French navies in the Mediterranean Sea. The drills were held under the code name Cleopatra 2016/2, they were the first for the ship after being delivered to Egypt the previous month. The exercises included a number of activities such as both forces planning and managing naval combat missions.
