= Sebastopol (disambiguation) =

Sebastopol or Sevastopol is a city on the Crimean peninsula.

Sebastopol may also refer to:

== Places ==
=== Australia ===
- Sebastopol, New South Wales, a parish in Clarendon County, New South Wales
- Sebastopol, Waljeers, a parish in Waljeers County, New South Wales
- Sebastopol, an unincorporated parish in Yancowinna County, New South Wales
- Sebastopol, South Australia, a locality in Wattle Range Council
- Sebastopol, Victoria, a suburb of Ballarat

=== Canada ===
- Sebastopol, Ontario, a community in the township of Perth East, Perth County
- Sebastopol Township, Ontario, amalgamated into Bonnechere Valley township, Renfrew County

=== France ===
- Boulevard de Sébastopol, a street in Paris
- Théâtre Sébastopol, an opera house in Lille

=== United States ===
- Sebastopol, California, a city in Sonoma County
- Sebastopol, Nevada County, California, an unincorporated community
- Sebastopol Plantation House, an a National Register of Historic Places listing in St. Bernard Parish, Louisiana
- Sebastopol, Michigan, a ghost town in Ottawa County
- Sebastopol, Mississippi, a town in Leake and Scott counties
- Sebastopol, a village in Jenkins Township, Luzerne County, Pennsylvania
- Sebastopol House Historic Site, an historic site in Seguin, Guadalupe County, Texas
- Sebastopol, Texas, an unincorporated community in Trinity County

=== Other places ===
- Sebastopol, Torfaen, a suburb of Pontypool, Wales, United Kingdom
- Sébastopol, Mauritius, a place in Mauritius
- Sebastopol, a village in Meinerzhagen, Germany
- Sebastopol, in Dooniver, Achill Island, County Mayo, Ireland
- Sebastopol, a mountain in Aoraki / Mount Cook National Park, New Zealand

== Music ==
- Sebastopol (band), an English alternative-rock band
- Sebastopol (album), a 2001 album by Jay Farrar

== Other uses ==
- Sebastopol (mortar), a large 19th-century Ethiopian artillery mortar
- Sebastopol (ship), a clipper ship
- Sebastopol, sister ship of the French minesweepers Inkerman and Cerisoles, lost in November 1918 on Lake Superior
- Sebastopol goose, a breed of goose
- Sebastopol, a domino game

== See also ==
- Réaumur–Sébastopol station, a Paris Metro station
- Sebastopolis (disambiguation)
- Sevastopol (disambiguation)
