= Siege of Sevastopol =

Siege of Sevastopol may refer to:

- Siege of Sevastopol (1854–1855), during the Crimean War
- Siege of Sevastopol (1941–1942), during the Second World War
- Siege of Sevastopol (panorama), a 1904 painted panorama by Franz Roubaud

== See also ==
- Sevastopol (disambiguation)
