= Sebaste =

Sebaste (Greek: Σεβαστή) was a common placename in classical Antiquity. Sebaste was the Greek equivalent (feminine) of the Latin Augusta. Ancient towns by the name sought to honor Augustus or a later Roman emperor.

Sebaste may refer to:

== Places in Turkey ==
- Sivas, a city in Sivas Province
  - as Sebastea or Sebaste di Armenia, a former Metropolitan archbishopric, now a Latin Catholic titular see
- Sebaste in Phrygia, town of ancient Phrygia, now in Turkey
- Elaiussa Sebaste, or Sebaste in Cilicia, near modern Ayas, in Mersin Province
- Cabira, later called Sebaste during Roman times
- Niksar, in modern Tokat Province, called Sebaste during Roman times
- Pompeiopolis, later called Sebaste during Roman times
- Sivaslı, a city in Uşak Province, once known as Sebaste

== Other places ==
- Sebastia, Nablus, or Sebaste in Palæstina, a village in the West Bank, known as Samaria before 30 BCE and Sebaste in Latin
- Sebaste, Antique, a municipality in the Philippines

== People ==
- Beppe Sebaste (1959–2026), Italian writer, poet, translator, and journalist

== See also ==
- Sevastopol
- Sebasteia
- Sebastopolis (disambiguation)
- Sebastos (Augustus)
