= Sevastopolsky =

Sevastopolsky (masculine), Sevastopolskaya (feminine), or Sevastopolskoye (neuter) may refer to:

- Sevastopolskaya (Moscow Metro), a station on the Serpukhovsko-Timiryazevskaya Line
- Sevastopolskaya (rural locality), a rural locality (a stanitsa) in Maykopsky District of the Republic of Adygea, Russia
- Sevastopolsky District, one of the historical administrative divisions of Moscow, Russia

== See also ==
- Dasha from Sevastopol (Dasha Sevastopolskaya) (1836–1892), Russian nurse during the siege of Sevastopol
- Sevastopolsky Vals, a song composed by Konstantin Listov (1900–1983)
