= Sebastopolis (Caria) =

Town of ancient Caria

Coordinates: 37°29′09″N 29°08′15″E

Sebastopolis (Ancient Greek: Σεβαστόπολις), also known as Saleia, was a town of ancient Caria, inhabited during Hellenistic, Roman, and Byzantine times. It minted coins in antiquity.

Its site is located near Kızılca in Asiatic Turkey.
