= Schiebel Camcopter S-100 =

Austrian UAV rotorcraft

Camcopter S-100
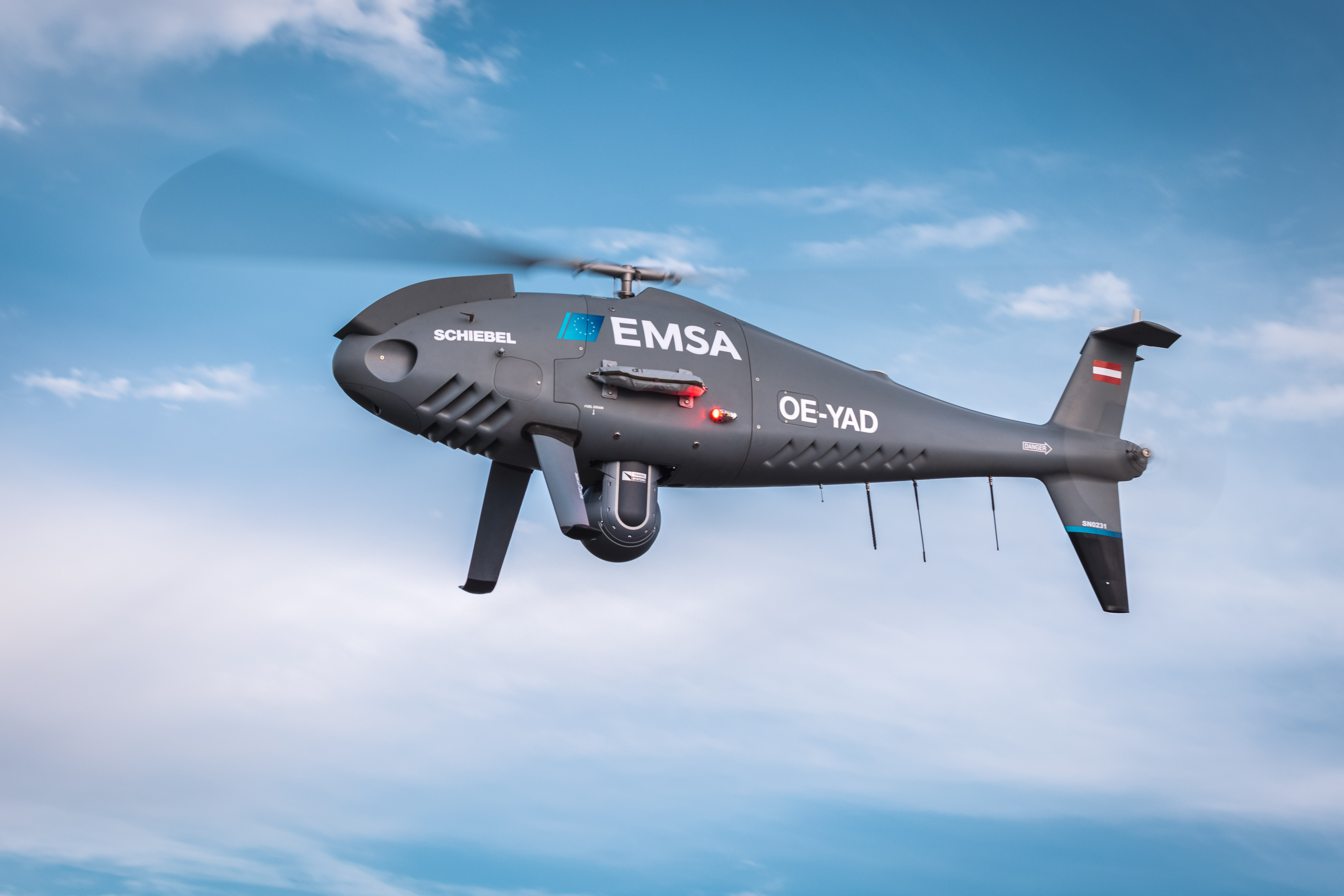
- Camcopter S-100 in operation for European Maritime Safety Agency, 2021

General information
- Type: UAV
- Manufacturer: Schiebel, Austria
- Status: in service
- Primary users: French Navy Royal Navy; United States Navy
- Number built: > 540

History
- Introduction date: 2005

The Schiebel Camcopter S-100 is an Austrian unmanned aerial vehicle (UAV) using a rotorcraft design.

== Design and development ==
Produced by the Austrian company Schiebel, it was developed from 2003 to 2005. With a maximum take-off weight (MTOW) of 200 kg (440 lb), its endurance is 6 hours (extendable to over 10 hours with optional external AVGAS fuel tanks fitted). It has a maximum speed of 220 km/h (140 mph) and a ceiling of 5,500 m (18,000 ft). It is powered by a 41 kW (55 hp) Schiebel Wankel engine and can carry various payloads, such as electro-optics and infrared sensors. The primary radio link between ground station(s) occupy the 5030-5091 MHz band. A secondary link in the UHF band would operate within 433.2125 MHz to 434.4625 MHz.

On 12 March 2012 Schiebel announced that it successfully tested a company-developed heavy-fuel engine. This heavy-fuel engine allows for the use of JP-5, Jet A-1 or JP-8 jet fuels. These fuels, which are standard on marine vessels, are safer to store and handle than gasoline.

On 7 February 2013, Schiebel flight tested a Thales Group I-Master surveillance radar system on the Camcopter at its Wiener Neustadt, Austria, facility. The I-Master system, weighing 30 kg (66 lb), provides ground moving target indication and synthetic-aperture radar operations.

== International customers ==
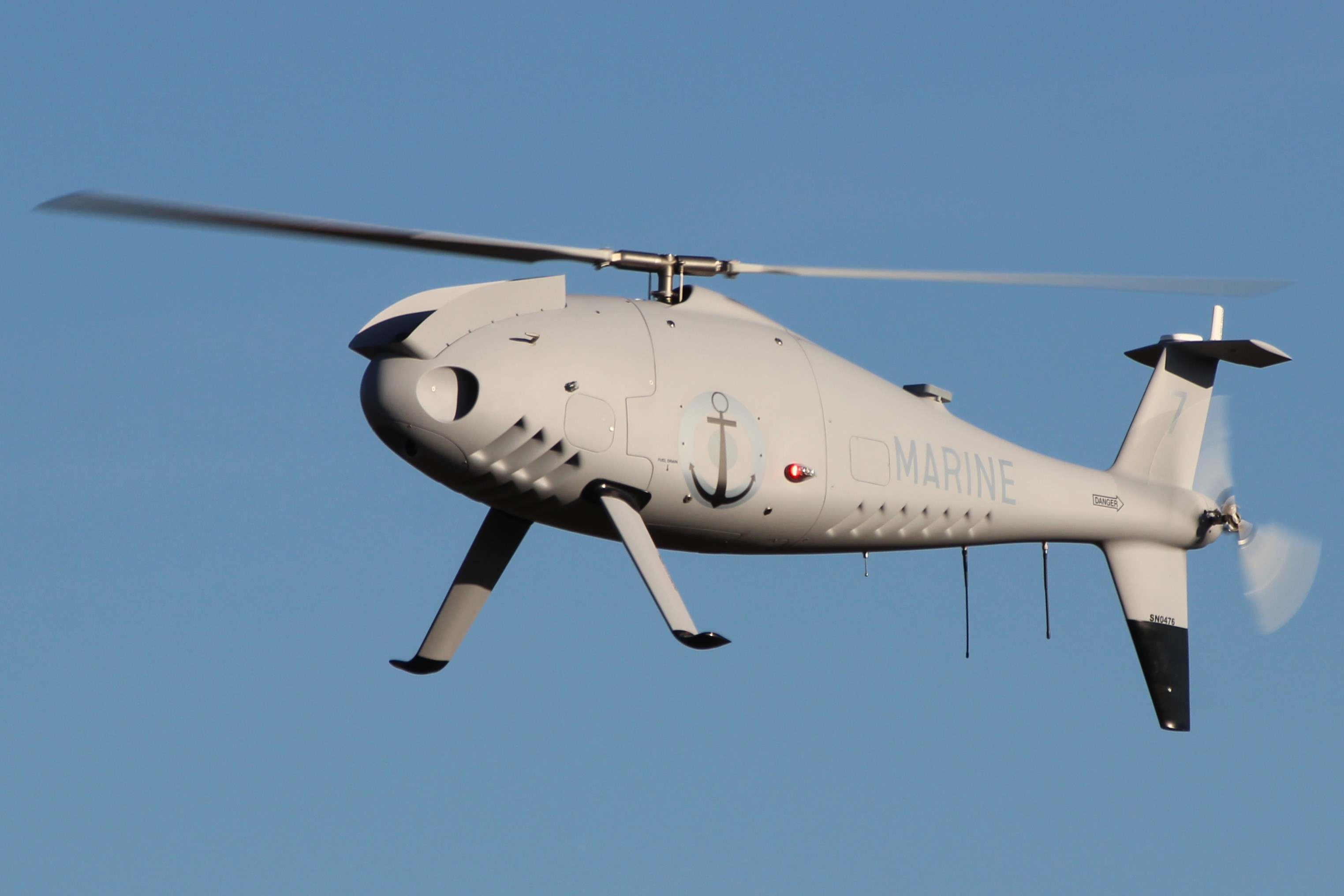
An S-100 operated by the French Navy

The launch customer for the S-100 was the UAE Army, which ordered 40 aircraft with an option for 40 more. The aircraft was ordered by three more undisclosed nations, with total orders reaching 200.

The Camcopter underwent sea trials on the Indian Navy's INS Sujata (P56) during October 2007. Flight testing occurred aboard a Pakistan Navy Tariq-class destroyer in the Arabian Sea on 16 March 2008, with further naval testing on 14 April 2008 on the Spanish Guardia Civil vessel Rio Miño off Gran Canaria.

The German Navy conducted testing during three weeks in August and September 2008 on the Braunschweig-class corvettes Braunschweig and Magdeburg, respectively. More than 130 takeoffs were conducted, and the UAV maintained unaided on-deck stability in greater than 15° flight deck roll conditions.

The French Navy performed test flights during September and October 2008, with a Camcopter spending four days on a barge in the Atlantic Ocean and a further three days on the frigate Montcalm (D642).

Libya ordered four Camcopters in 2009, which were placed under command of the Khamis Brigade.

Jordan ordered two S-100s with L3Harris Wescam MX-10 EO-IR payloads in July 2010 and accepted delivery in February 2011.

In November 2011 the Camcopter demonstrated flights from the French Gowind-class corvette L'Adroit. At the same time, the Gorizont (Horizon) Air S-100, a Russian license-built version of the UAV was successfully tested aboard the Coast Guard patrol cutter Rubin. Russia intends to equip all Rubin-class patrol boats with these UAVs.

In 2010 the Chinese Navy purchased 18 of these systems. Two years later, in May 2012, an unmanned UAV believed to be a Camcopter S-100 was photographed operating from the fantail of a Chinese Type 054A frigate.

In April 2012, the Camcopter became the first unmanned helicopter to fly from an Italian Navy vessel when it was flight tested from the MM Bersagliere (F-584). In February 2014, the Italian Navy chose the S-100 as its primary unmanned aerial system for shipboard operations, where it will be used for intelligence, surveillance and reconnaissance (ISR). It will additionally support other activities, such as search and rescue and natural disaster recovery. They are currently assigned to the 4° Gruppo Elicotteri (4th Helicopter Sqn.) based at the Grottaglie Naval Air Station near Taranto.

In December 2014, the Camcopter went through a series of trials in Bizerte, Tunisia, to serve within the Tunisian Army. Schiebel selected the Italian company Leonardo to supply AESA-based SAR radar for the systems which were to enter service in 2017.

In February 2017, the Royal Australian Navy awarded a contract to provide an unrevealed number of Camcopter systems, plus three-years support. The type is operated by 822X Squadron RAN, which is responsible for trialling UAVs.

In 2018, the Belgian Navy conducted a week-long testing of the Camcopter, assessing its utility for maritime surveillance and search and rescue.

In early 2023, the Royal Navy selected the system for operations in an intelligence-gathering, surveillance and reconnaissance role. It is named "Peregrine" in Royal Navy service, after HMS Peregrine, the former Royal Naval Air Station Ford. Equipped with the Thales I-Master radar and other sensors, it was initially intended to begin operations in the Persian Gulf in mid-2024. In February 2025, it was announced that a Peregrine UAV had successfully completed a number of sorties from the flight deck of HMS Lancaster, a frigate engaged in anti-narcotic operations in the Gulf of Oman.

In August 2025, the Government of Canada awarded two contracts to MDA, which had partnered with Schiebel to offer the Camcopter S-100 and in-service support to the Royal Canadian Navy. The contracts cover the acquisition of two systems with options for the purchase of a further four. Initial operating capability was expected in 2027/8, with FOC in 2032.

The Hellenic Navy acquired the Camcopter to complement the FDI frigates. 4 systems (8 vehicles) were ordered in February 2026.

== Airframe losses ==
On 10 May 2012, an Austrian engineer from Schiebel was killed and two South Korean colleagues were injured when a Camcopter S-100 crashed into their control vehicle during a test flight in the South Korean city of Incheon.

On 28 May 2013, Somalia's Harakat al-Shabaab al-Mujahideen reportedly shot down a Camcopter S-100 operated by the U.S. military, and released photographs of the wreckage.

On 25 August 2015, forces in Yemen shot down a Camcopter S-100 operated by the United Arab Emirates Army in the area of Mukayris of southern Yemen.

On 28 August 2020, a Camcopter S-100 owned by the European Maritime Safety Agency and operated by the Croatian Ministry of Maritime Affairs, Transport and Infrastructure crashed shortly after takeoff from Brač Airport, causing a fire which destroyed 150 hectares (370 acres) of macchia. No injuries were reported.

On 20 April 2022, it was claimed that Ukrainian forces shot down a Horizon Air S-100 operated by the Russian Armed Forces using a man-portable air-defense system. The images showed the wreckage of a Russian VM-V helicopter target (decoy) with its manufacturer AO TsNTU Dinamika (Russian: АО ЦНТУ «Динамика») written on the plate.

French Navy losses:

Early in November 2022, the French Navy reported the loss of one of their UAVs in the sea. The cause was reported to be technical (failure of the engine control unit). It followed the loss of their first UAV in 2012, also in the sea.

A third UAV is reported damaged at sea following an engine over temperature/engine fire during a training flight from Dixmude LHD on November 9th 2024. This event is subject to the safety investigation M-2024-24-A led by BEA-é.

== Operators ==
=== Military users ===
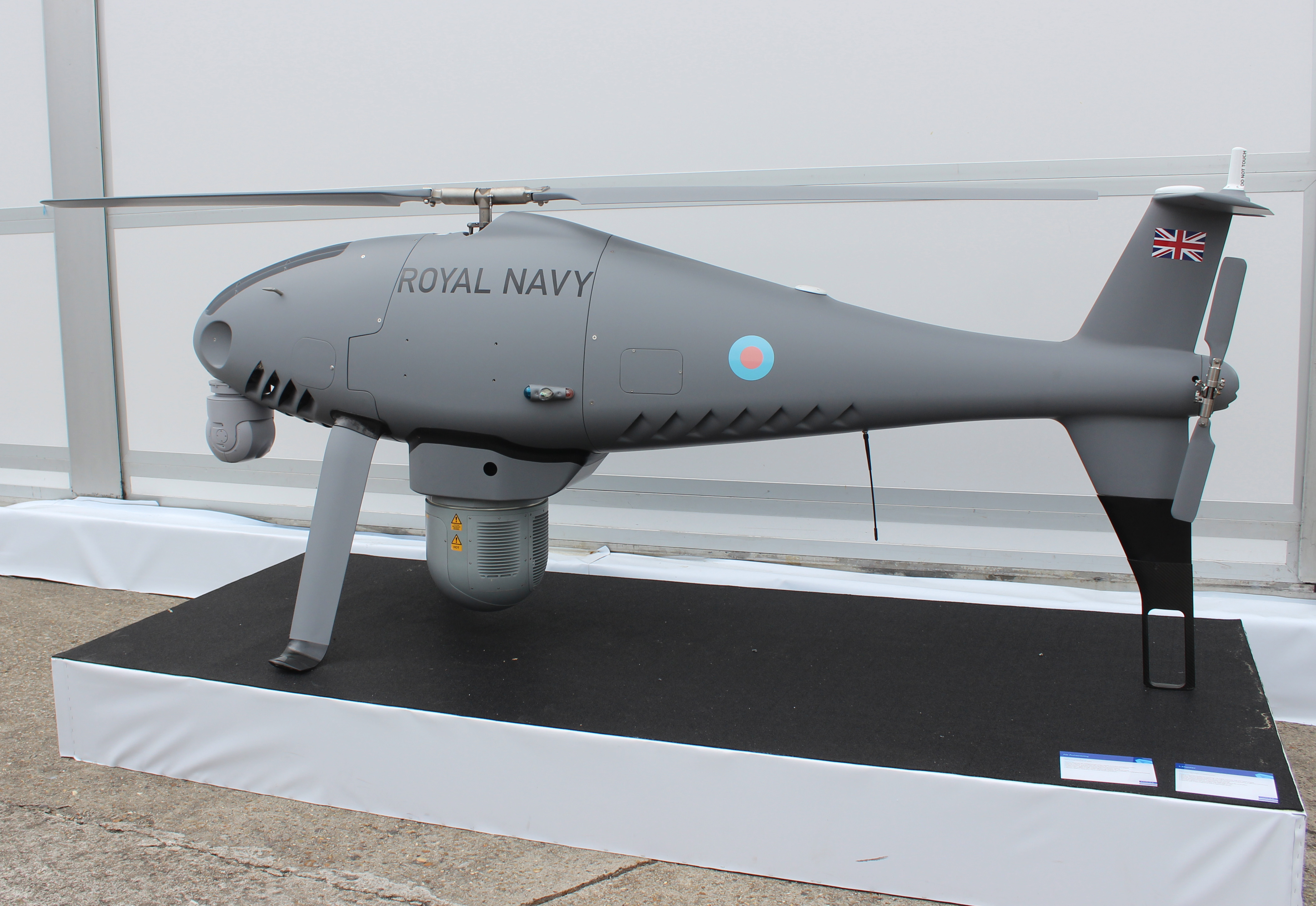
UAS Peregrine System (Camcopter S-100) in Royal Navy colour scheme at the Thales stand at the Paris Air Show 2023

- Australia (will be phased out from the end of June 2024)
- Bangladesh (Bangladesh Navy)
- Belgium
- Canada (CU-179 Peregrine)
- Egypt
- France (French Navy e.g. from Mistral-class landing helicopter dock)
- Greece
- Iceland (Icelandic Coast Guard)
- India (Indian Navy)
- Indonesia (Indonesian Navy)
- Italy
- Jordan
- Libya
- Malaysia
- Mozambique
- Pakistan (Pakistan Navy)
- Thailand
- Tunisia
- United Arab Emirates
- United States
- United Kingdom (Royal Navy Fleet Air Arm, under the name Peregrine)
  - 700X Naval Air Squadron

=== Non-military users ===
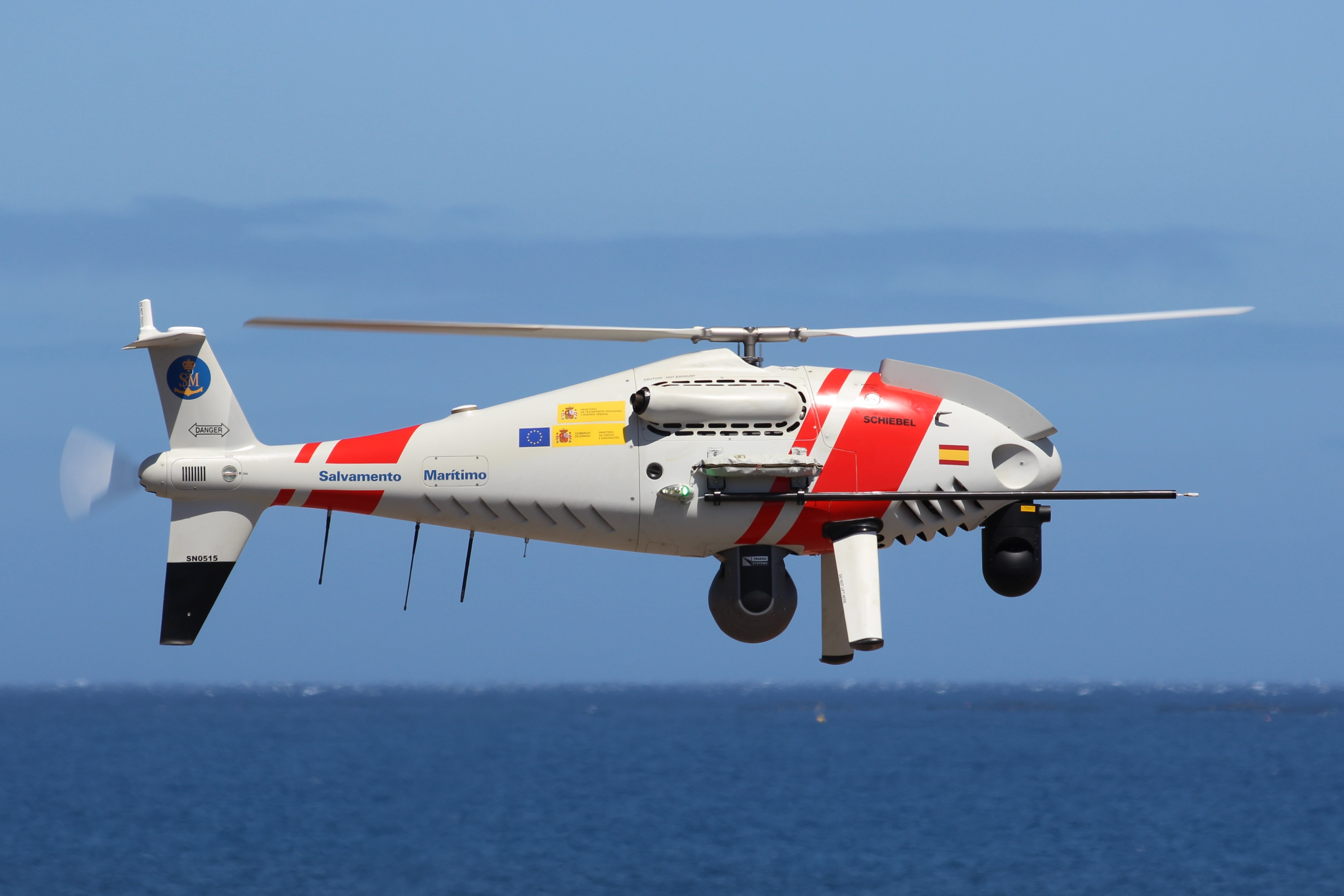
Camcopter S-100 of SASEMAR, Maritime Safety and Rescue Society, Spain

- Chile
  - Carabineros de Chile
- Croatia
  - Ministry of Maritime Affairs, Transport and Infrastructure
- Finland
  - Finnish Border Guard
- Malta
  - Migrant Offshore Aid Station
- Europe
  - European Maritime Safety Agency
  - Organization for Security and Co-operation in Europe
- Romania
  - Romanian Border Police
- Russia
  - Russian Coast Guard
- Spain
  - Maritime Safety and Rescue Society
- United Kingdom
  - HM Coastguard
  - National Police Air Service
- Norway
  - Nordic Unmanned

== Specifications ==
Data from Schiebel.net (General); Armada International (Powerplant 1); Schiebel.net (Powerplant 2)

General characteristics

- Crew: None
- Capacity: 50 kg (110 lb)
- Length: 3.11 m (10 ft 2 in)
- Width: 1.24 m (4 ft 1 in)
- Height: 1.12 m (3 ft 8 in)
- Empty weight: 110 kg (243 lb)
- Max takeoff weight: 200 kg (441 lb)
- Fuel capacity: 57 L (15.5 gal) AVGas 100 LL
- Powerplant: 1 × Schiebel S1 Wankel engine, 41 kW (55 hp) (basic)
- Powerplant: 1 × Schiebel heavy fuel S2 Wankel engine (optional)
- Main rotor diameter: 3.4 m (11 ft 2 in)

Performance

- Maximum speed: 220 km/h (140 mph, 120 kn)
- Cruise speed: 190 km/h (120 mph, 100 kn)
- Never exceed speed: 240 km/h (150 mph, 130 kn)
- Range: 180 km (110 mi, 97 nmi)
- Endurance: 6 hours
- Service ceiling: 5,500 m (18,000 ft)
- g limits: +3.5 g to –1 g

Armament

- Hardpoints: 2
- Missiles: 2x Lightweight Multirole Missile

== See also ==
Related lists

- List of unmanned aerial vehicles
