= Federal Service for Military-Technical Cooperation =

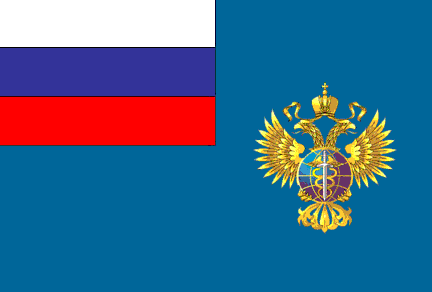
- Abbreviation: FSVTS

Agency overview
- Formed: 2004

Jurisdictional structure
- Federal agency: RUS
- Operations jurisdiction: RUS
- Governing body: Government of Russia
- General nature: Federal law enforcement

Operational structure
- Headquarters: Ovchinnikovskaya Nab., 18/1, Moscow
- Elected officer responsible: Dmitry Medvedev, Prime Minister of Russia
- Agency executive: Dmitry Shugaev, Director
- Parent agency: Government of Russia

Website
- http://www.fsvts.gov.ru/

The Federal Service for Military-Technical Cooperation (Russian: Федеральная служба по военно-техническому сотрудничеству, Federalnaya sluzhba po voenno-tekhnicheskomu sotrudnishestvu; abbreviated ФСВТС России, FSVTS Rossii) is a Russian government service regulating Military-Technical Cooperation issues. The service reports to the President, and is subject to jurisdiction of the Ministry of Defense. The organizational structure consists of the Central Office and its representative offices in foreign states.

Since January 30, 2017, it has been led by Dmitry Shugaev and under directly authority of the Russian Ministry of Defense.

== History ==
Since 2000, the Russian Federation has established a sufficiently effective system to manage military-technical cooperation between the Russian Federation and foreign states, incorporating the Federal Service for Military-Technical Cooperation (from December 1, 2000 till 16 August 2004, it was called The Committee for Military-Technical Cooperation; Комитет Российской Федерации по военно-техническому сотрудничеству с иностранными государствами) as its critical enabler. The Federal Service for Military-Technical Cooperation is empowered with control and supervision functions in the military-technical cooperation area.

Regulations for the Federal Service for Military-Technical Cooperation were approved by Decree of the Russian President from August 16, 2004 No. 1083 "On the Federal Service for Military-Technical Cooperation".

== Activities ==
1. To perform control and supervision functions in the area of military-technical cooperation in compliance with laws of the Russian Federation;
2. To participate jointly with other federal government authorities in elaboration of state policy in the area of military-technical cooperation and submit in the established manner relevant proposals to the President of the Russian Federation, the Government of the Russian Federation, and Defense Ministry of the Russian Federation;
3. To ensure jointly with other federal government authorities implementation of key state policy guidelines in the area of military-technical cooperation as set by the President of the Russian Federation;
4. Within its competence and jointly with other federal government authorities, to implement state regulations in the area of military-technical cooperation.

== Directors ==
- Aleksander Fomin (2012 - 2017)
- Dmitry Shugaev (since 2017)
