= Schiebel =

Austrian manufacturer of mine detectors and UAVs

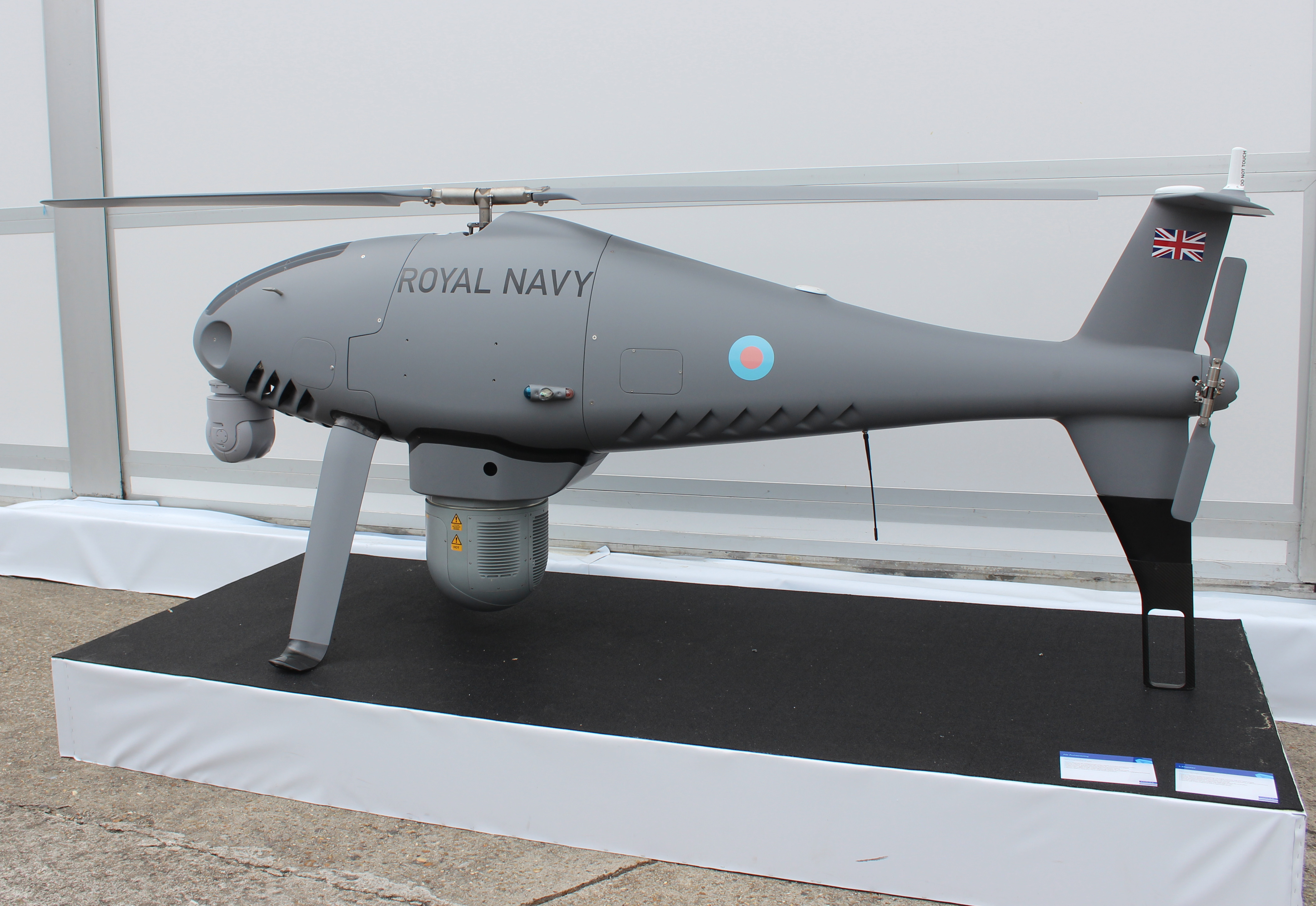
UAS Peregrine System Camcopter S-100 at the Thales stand at the Paris Air Show 2023

Schiebel Corporation is an Austrian company that manufactures mine detectors and helicopter UAVs. It is based in Vienna.

The company was founded in 1951 as a manufacturer of small electronic components, for example for washing machines, and started with the engineering of mine detectors in the mid-1980s. Since the mid-1990s, the company is also engaged in constructing UAVs.

The company has its factory in Wiener Neustadt.

== Products ==
- Camcopter S-100
- Camcopter S-300
