= RFA Cardigan Bay =

2006 Bay-class dock landing ship of the Royal Fleet Auxiliary

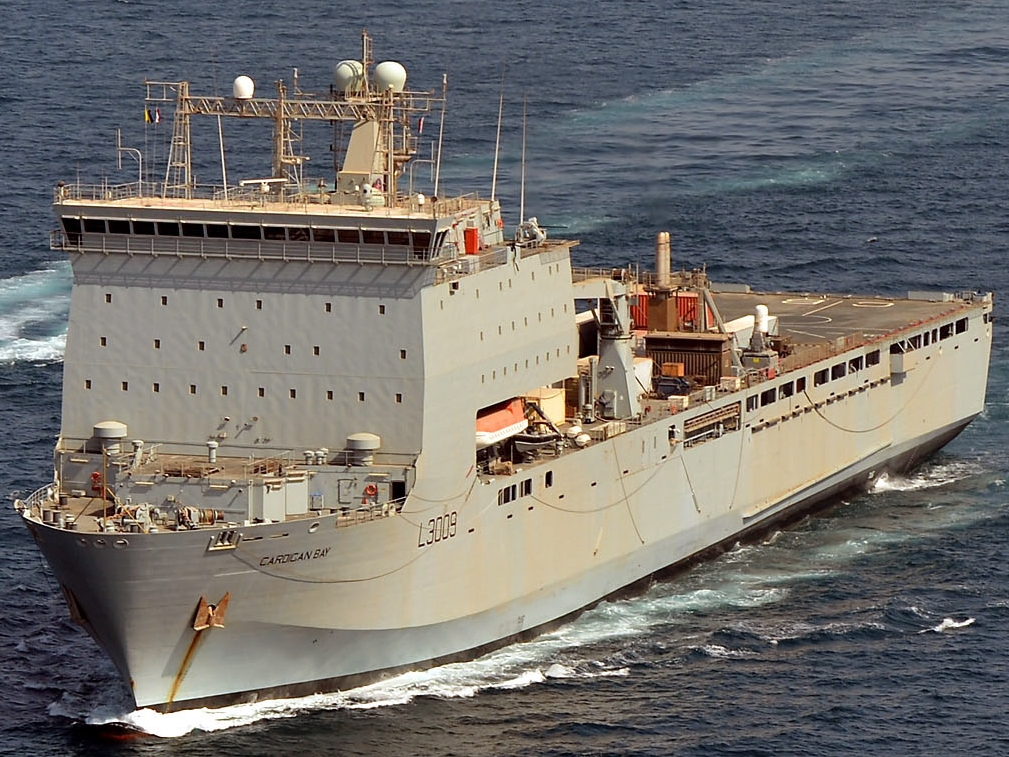
- RFA Cardigan Bay in the Middle East, August 2012

History

United Kingdom
- Name: RFA Cardigan Bay
- Ordered: 19 November 2001
- Builder: BAE Systems, Govan, Glasgow
- Laid down: 13 October 2003
- Launched: 8–9 April 2005
- In service: 18 December 2006
- Home port: Falmouth
- Identification: Pennant number: L3009; IMO number: 9240782; International call sign: GCID; Deck code: CB
- Status: Reported starting refit as of April 2026

General characteristics
- Class & type: Bay-class landing ship dock
- Displacement: 16,160 t (15,905 long tons) full load
- Length: 579.4 ft (176.6 m)
- Beam: 86.6 ft (26.4 m)
- Draught: 19 ft (5.8 m)
- Propulsion: 2 × Wärtsilä 8L26 generators, 6,000 hp (4.5 MW); 2 × Wärtsilä 12V26 generators, 9,000 hp (6.7 MW); 2 × azimuth thrusters; 1 × bow thruster
- Speed: 18 knots (33 km/h; 21 mph)
- Range: 8,000 nmi (15,000 km; 9,200 mi) at 15 kn (28 km/h; 17 mph)
- Boats & landing craft carried: 1 LCU or 2 LCVP in well deck; Mexeflote powered rafts
- Capacity: 1,150 linear metres of vehicles (up to 24 Challenger 2 tanks or 150 light trucks); Cargo capacity of 200 tons ammunition or 24 TEU containers
- Troops: 356 standard, 700 overload
- Complement: 60
- Armament: 2 × DS30B Mk 1 30 mm guns; 2 × Phalanx CIWS; 4 × 7.62mm Mk.44 Miniguns (may be replaced by Browning .50 caliber heavy machine guns as of 2023); 6 × 7.62mm L7 GPMGs
- Aircraft carried: Not routinely carried but a temporary hangar can be fitted.
- Aviation facilities: Flight deck can operate helicopters up to Chinook size

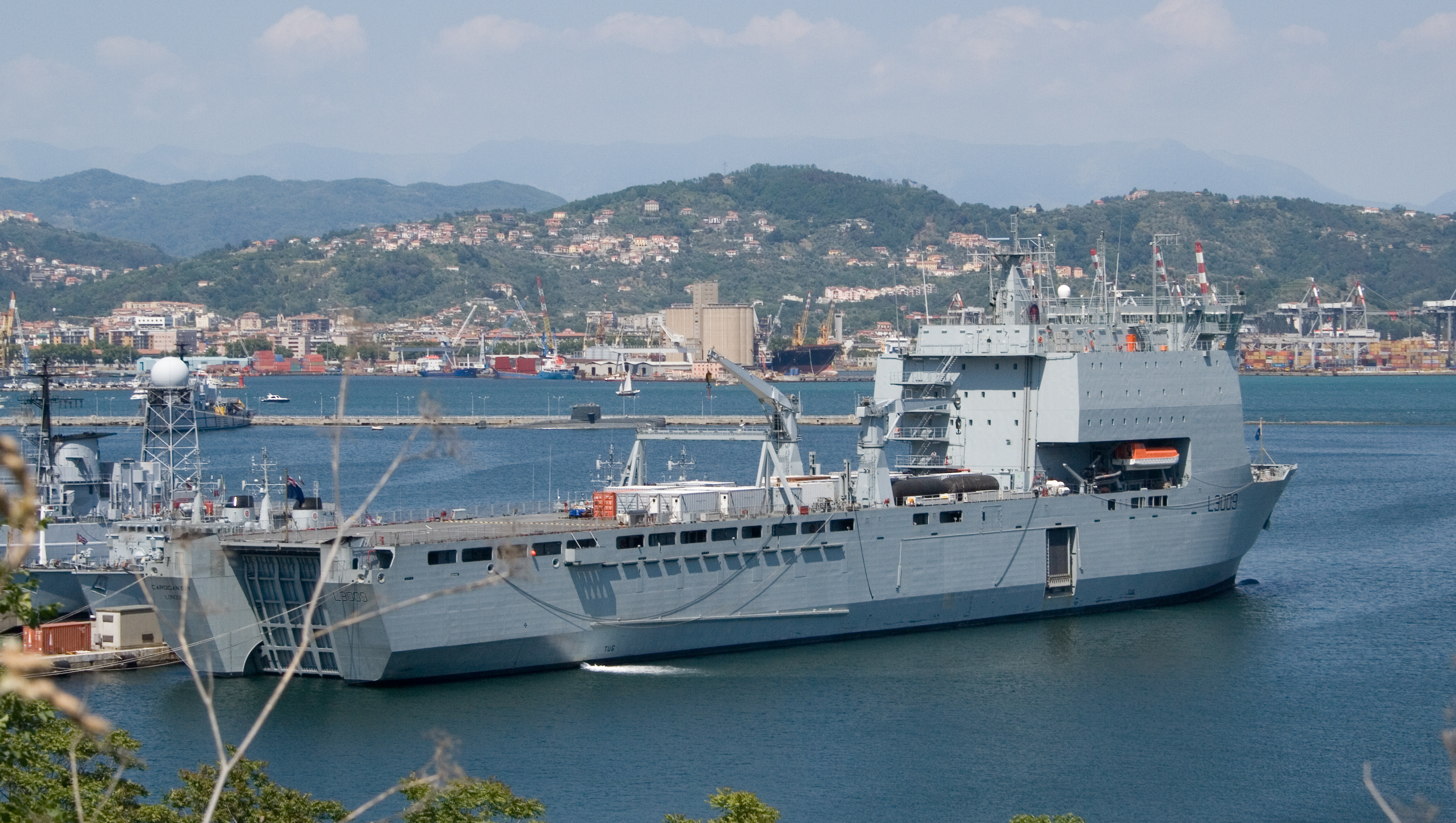
RFA Cardigan Bay at La Spezia in 2009

RFA Cardigan Bay is a Bay-class landing ship dock of the Royal Fleet Auxiliary (RFA). Built by BAE Systems, the ship was dedicated into the RFA at the end of 2006.

== Design and construction ==
The Bay class was designed as a replacement for the Round Table-class logistics ships operated by the RFA. The new design was based on the Royal Schelde Enforcer design; a joint project between the Dutch and Spanish resulting in the Rotterdam-class and Galicia-class amphibious warfare ships. The main difference with the British ships is the lack of a helicopter hangar. The ships were originally designated "auxiliary landing ship logistics" or ALSL, but this was changed in 2002 to "landing ship dock (auxiliary)" or LSD(A), better reflecting their operational role. Four ships were ordered; two from Swan Hunter, and two from BAE Systems Naval Ships.

The Bay-class ships have a full load displacement of 16,160 tonnes (15,900 long tons). Each is 579.4 feet (176.6 m) long, with a beam of 86.6 feet (26.4 m), and a draught of 19 feet (5.8 m). Propulsion power is provided by two Wärtsilä 8L26 generators, providing 6,000 horsepower (4.5 MW), and two Wärtsilä 12V26 generators, providing 9,000 horsepower (6.7 MW). These are used to drive two steerable azimuth thrusters, with a bow thruster supplementing. Maximum speed is 18 knots (33 km/h; 21 mph), and the Bay-class ships can achieve a range of 8,000 nautical miles (15,000 km; 9,200 mi) at 15 knots (28 km/h; 17 mph). For self-defence, Cardigan Bay is armed with two 30 mm DS30B cannons, four Mk.44 miniguns (replaced by .50 heavy machine guns as of 2023), six 7.62mm L7 GPMGs, and two Phalanx CIWS. The standard ship's company consists of 60 officers and sailors.

As a sealift ship, Cardigan Bay is capable of carrying up to 24 Challenger 2 tanks or 150 light trucks in 1,150 linear metres of space. The cargo capacity is equivalent of 200 tons of ammunition, or 24 twenty-foot equivalent unit containers. During normal conditions, a Bay-class ship can carry 356 soldiers, but this can be almost doubled to 700 in overload conditions. Helicopters are not routinely carried on board, but a temporary hangar can be fitted and the flight deck is capable of handling helicopters up to the size of Chinooks, as well as Merlin helicopters and Osprey tiltrotor aircraft. The well dock can carry one LCU Mark 10 or two LCVPs, and two Mexeflotes can be suspended from the ship's flanks. Two 30-ton cranes are fitted between the superstructure and the flight deck.

Cardigan Bay and sister ship Mounts Bay were ordered from BAE on 19 November 2001. Cardigan Bay was laid down at BAE's shipyard at Govan, Scotland on 13 October 2003. Plans to launch the ship on 8 April 2005 were frustrated by high winds and unusually low tides; the naming ceremony was carried out that day, and the actual launching took place the next day, with more favourable tide conditions. Cardigan Bay was dedicated on 18 December 2006, the third of the class to enter service with the RFA.

== Operational history ==
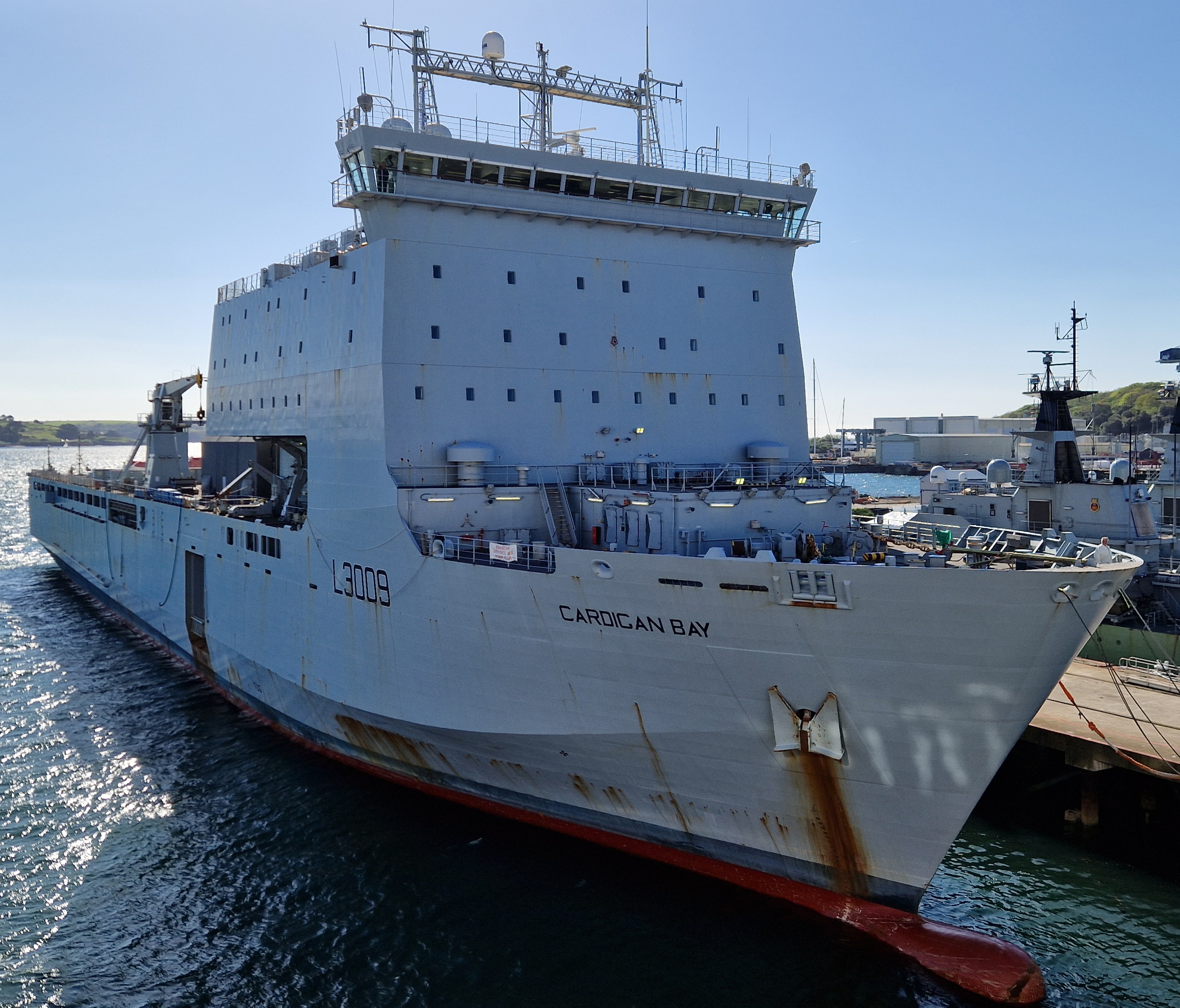
RFA Cardigan Bay undergoing refit at Falmouth, 4 May 2025 (Credit: T Brogan)

Cardigan Bay has been deployed as part of the Royal Navy Response Force Task Group, carrying elements of 40 Commando.

In June 2011, the vessel headed to Yemen to aid with the potential evacuation of British citizens affected by the ongoing unrest in the country. In July 2011, she docked at Berbera, and a landing craft from Cardigan Bay landed two BvS 10 Viking armoured vehicles and Royal Marines of 539 Assault Squadron in Somaliland. They penetrated several miles of "bandit country" to meet up with an important clan chief and take him back to Cardigan Bay for a meeting with MI6 and Foreign Office officials. This was part of Exercise Somaliland Cougar, an operation to train Somali coastguards in anti-piracy techniques and to establish relationships with tribal leaders.

In 2013, Cardigan Bay exercised with the COUGAR 13 task group.

While east of Suez, Cardigan Bay participated in several exercises including IMCMEX 2014. Upon her return to the UK, Cardigan Bay underwent a major refit in Falmouth followed by sea trials and FOST in April 2017 in preparation for deployment later in the year. By June 2017, Cardigan Bay was back in the Indian Ocean and assisted HMS Monmouth in the rescue of a crewman from the sunken tanker Rama 2.

For the past number of years, Cardigan Bay has been the support ship usually based at HMS Jufair supporting Royal Navy mine countermeasures operations as part of Operation Kipion. In May 2021, she was temporarily relieved in that role by RFA Lyme Bay. In May 2022 it was reported that the ship had completed refit in Falmouth and was earmarked to return to the Persian Gulf, replacing Lyme Bay. In February 2023, the autonomous minehunting vessel RNMB Harrier arrived in Bahrain to begin trials of autonomous systems in hot weather. The autonomous vessel was intended to operate from Cardigan Bay.

In 2023, it was reported that Cardigan Bay would eventually be replaced in her mine countermeasures support role by ships that would be acquired and converted into an MCM command and support role for autonomous systems in the RFA. One of these ships was reported as likely to replace Cardigan Bay and some of the other vessels in 9 Mine Countermeasures Squadron. Cardigan Bay would then be returned to a primary amphibious operations role.

In April 2024, Cardigan Bay deployed to the Mediterranean to assist in the delivery of humanitarian supplies to Gaza during the Gaza war. American soldiers and sailors working on building the Gaza floating pier were reported to use Cardigan Bay as a dormitory. In August 2024, it was reported that Cardigan Bay was returning to the U.K. for refit and was being replaced in the Mediterranean by RFA Mounts Bay. The vessel returned to the U.K. in early September. However, due to acute personnel shortages and labour action by RFA sailors over low pay, the movement of the vessel to the Falmouth shipyard for refit was delayed. In October, she was transferred to Falmouth to await refit. Although reported in dry dock for refit in February 2025, it was subsequently reported that her refit would not begin until 2026. Her refit was then reported to have been initiated as of April 2026.
