= Enforcer (ship design) =

Ship design

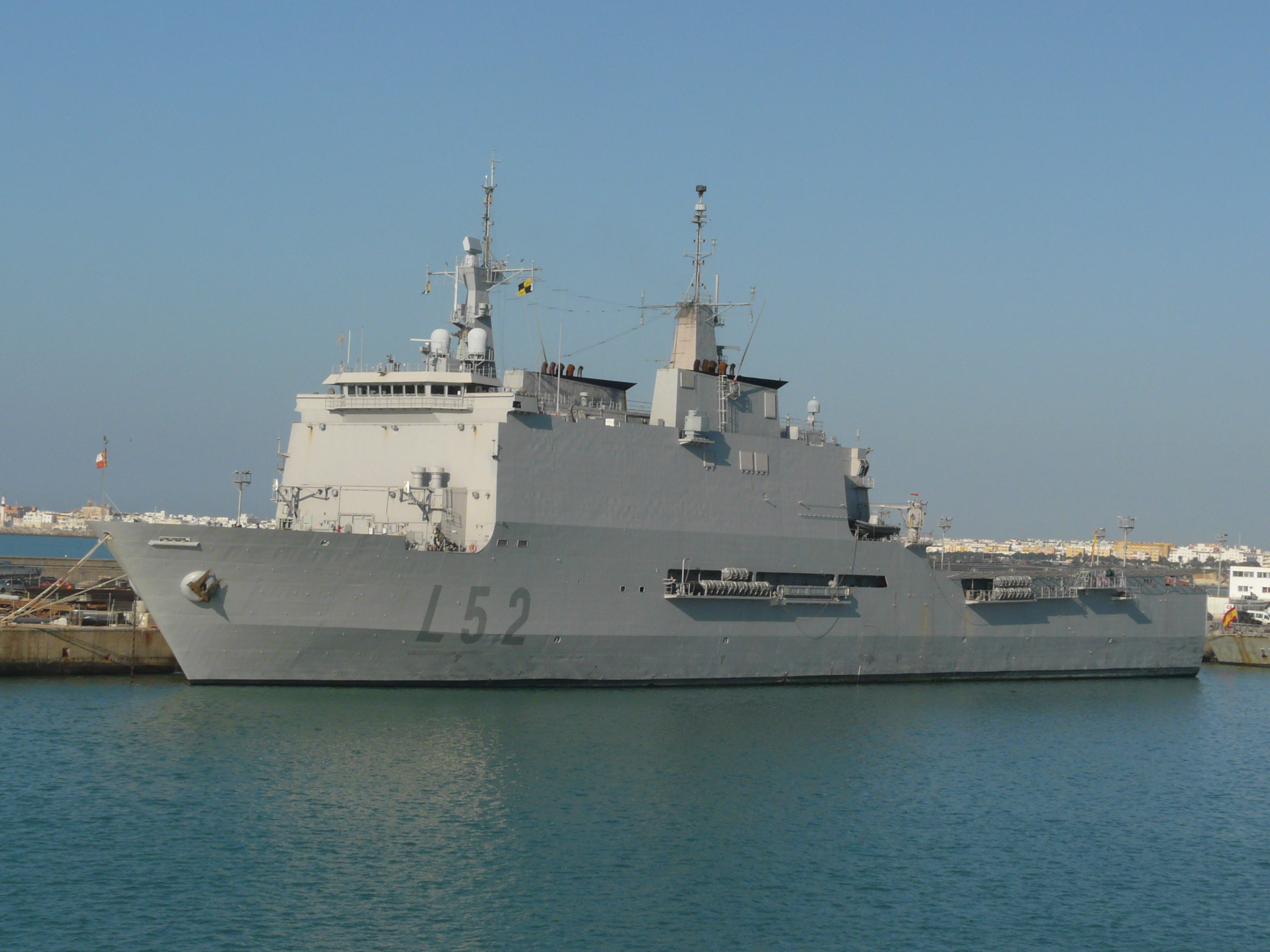
- Castilla in 2009

Class overview
- Name: Enforcer
- Builders: Damen Schelde Naval Shipbuilding; Damen Shipyards Galați; Empresa Nacional Bazán; Swan Hunter; BAE Systems Maritime
- Operators: Royal Netherlands Navy; Royal Navy; Royal Australian Navy; Spanish Navy
- Subclasses: Galicia-class; Rotterdam-class; Bay-class
- Built: 1996-2006
- In commission: 1998-present
- Completed: 8
- Active: 8

General characteristics
- Type: Landing Platform Dock

The Enforcer is a ship design created by Royal Schelde (now Damen Schelde Naval Shipbuilding) following the design and building of HNLMS Rotterdam. HNLMS Rotterdam was jointly developed by the Royal Netherlands Navy and the Spanish Navy.

Development began in the 1980s, when the Royal Netherlands Navy began investigating ways to provide an amphibious transport capability. In 1994, preliminary design work began. The Spanish government proposed in 1990 to collaborate on the design. A Memorandum of Understanding was signed in June 1992. Development of the base design occurred during 1993, after which the navies turned to local companies for further design work and construction: Royal Schelde in the Netherlands, and Bazán (which became Navantia in 2005) in Spain.

Royal Schelde completed one ship to the Rotterdam class, with HNLMS Rotterdam constructed between 1995 and 1998. Bazan/Navantia completed two ships to the Galicia-class design.

After building Rotterdam, Royal Schelde developed the "Enforcer Family": four variants of the Enforcer design intended for export sale. Increased modularity, less powerful propulsion systems, and increased use of commercial construction standards allowed the company to offer the export variants at lower prices.

The Enforcer design also served as the basis of a second ship for the Royal Netherlands Navy; HNLMS Johan de Witt, which was laid down in 2003 and commissioned in 2007. The design was used for the British Bay-class landing ships. Four vessels were built for the Royal Fleet Auxiliary by two shipyards between 2002 and 2007, with one sold in 2011 to the Royal Australian Navy.

The Enforcer design was considered a contender for the Indian Navy Multi-Role Support Vessel programme.

== Enforcer redesign ==
In 2023 Damen released its updated portfolio of Enforcer Landing Platform Dock (LPD). This update saw a significant redesign to facilitate new equipment, material upgrades, improved internal logistics and greater levels of design 'flexibility'. The new portfolio consists of seven sibling designs that range in size and by extension the size of internal facilities / capacity (embarked military force, crew size, aviation spots, hangar capacity etc.). The largest design (Enforcer 18028) is 180 metres in length and capable of embarking a force of 590-790 personnel with a crew of 155; the smallest (Enforcer 12026) is 120 metres with an embarked force of 200-270 and a crew of 90.

The new Enforcer design is highlighted as a contender for a possible UK / Netherlands amphibious requirement with both nations exploring options for joint acquisition of a new common LHP design to replace the three Bay-class and two Albion-class ships, plus RFA Argus of the Royal Navy and Royal Fleet Auxiliary (known as the Multi-Role Support Ship program), as well as the two Rotterdam-class LPDs and the four Holland-class offshore patrol vessels of the Royal Netherland Navy (Known as LPX program).

== Ships based on Enforcer design ==
Here is a list of ships that are based on the Enforcer design.

Royal Netherlands Navy
Name	Laid down	Launched	In service	Out of service	Notes
HNLMS Rotterdam (L800)	25 January 1996	27 February 1997	18 April 1998	-	In active service
HNLMS Johan de Witt (L801)	18 June 2003	13 May 2006	30 November 2007	-	In active service
Spanish Navy
Galicia (L51)	May 1996	21 July 1997	29 April 1998	-	In active service
Castilla (L52)	May 1997	14 June 1999	29 June 2000	-	In active service
Royal Fleet Auxiliary
RFA Largs Bay (L3006)	28 January 2002	18 July 2003	28 November 2006	April 2011	Sold to RAN in April 2011
RFA Lyme Bay (L3007)	22 November 2000	3 September 2005	26 November 2007	-	In active service
RFA Mounts Bay (L3008)	25 August 2002	9 April 2004	13 July 2006	-	In active service
RFA Cardigan Bay (L3009)	13 October 2003	8–9 April 2005	18 December 2006	-	In active service
Royal Australian Navy
Name	Acquired		In service	Out of service	Notes
HMAS Choules (L100) (ex-Largs Bay)	6 April 2011		13 December 2011	-	In active service
