= Spanish ship Castilla (L52) =

1999 Galicia-class landing platform dock

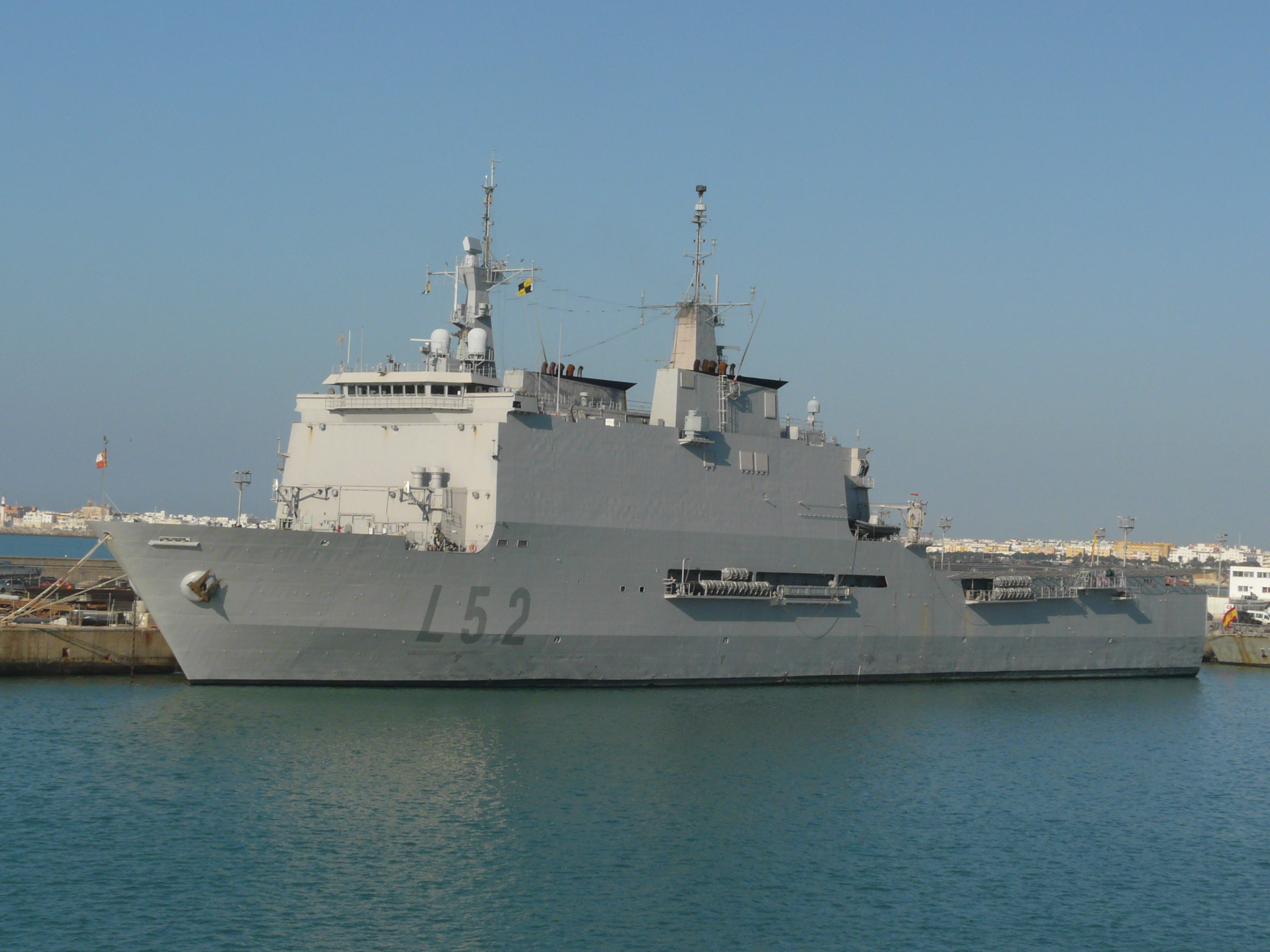
- Castilla docked at the Rota naval base.

History

Spain
- Name: Castilla
- Namesake: Castilla
- Ordered: 9 May 1997
- Builder: Empresa Nacional Bazán
- Laid down: 11 December 1997
- Launched: 14 June 1999
- Commissioned: 26 June 2000
- Home port: Naval Station Rota
- Identification: Pennant number: L52
- Status: Ship in active service

General characteristics
- Class & type: Galicia-class landing platform dock
- Displacement: 13,815 t (13,597 long tons) full load
- Length: 160 m (524 ft 11 in) oa; 142 m (465 ft 11 in) pp
- Beam: 25 m (82 ft 0 in)
- Draught: 5.9 m (19 ft 4 in)
- Propulsion: 4 Bazan/Caterpillar 3612 diesel engines; 9,330 kW (12,512 hp), 2 shafts, 1 510 kW (680 hp) bow thruster
- Speed: 20 knots (37 km/h; 23 mph) maximum
- Range: 6,000 nmi (11,000 km; 6,900 mi) at 12 knots (22 km/h; 14 mph)
- Boats & landing craft carried: 4 LCM-1E
- Capacity: 543 fully-equipped soldiers and 130 APCs or 33 MBTs
- Complement: 189
- Sensors & processing systems: DA08 air / surface search IRSCAN SATCOM, Link 1, JMCIS
- Armament: 4 Sippican Hycor SRBOC MK36 launchers; 2 × Oerlikon Contraves 20 mm (0.79 in) cannon
- Aircraft carried: 4 SH-3D or 6 AB 212 helicopters
- Aviation facilities: 60 m × 25 m (197 ft × 82 ft) flight deck, hangar

Castilla (L52) is a Galicia-class landing platform dock (LPD), and is the twelfth ship of this name. She is the sister ship to the amphibious warfare vessel Galicia. The vessel is primarily used to transport Spanish marines but is also used for humanitarian aid missions. Launched in 1999 and commissioned in 2000, Castilla took part in Operation Romeo Sierra as part of the Perejil Island crisis in 2002, has participated in multiple military exercises with NATO and provided humanitarian relief in the Caribbean Sea and Gulf of Mexico.

== Design and description ==
The project began in the Netherlands in 1990 as that country sought a solution to their LPD requirements. Spain joined the project in July 1991 and the definition stage was completed by December 1993. The Galicia class spawned from the joint Enforcer design with Spain's lead ship being authorised on 29 July 1994. The LPDs were designed to transport a battalion of marines and disembark them offshore and general logistic support. Vessels of the class have a full load displacement of 13,815 t (13,597 long tons; 15,228 short tons). (Note: The Spanish Navy's website has the vessels at 13,000 t (13,000 long tons; 14,000 short tons).) The vessels measure 160 metres (524 ft 11 in) long overall and 142 m (465 ft 11 in) between perpendiculars with a beam of 25 m (82 ft 0 in) and a draught of 5.9 m (19 ft 4 in).

The LPDs are powered by four Bazan/Caterpillar 3612 diesel engines in two sets initially creating 9,330 kilowatts (12,512 hp) though this was later increased to 16,000 kW (22,000 hp), and an 1,100 kW (1,500 hp) electric generator tied to reduction gear. Each vessel has two shafts with 4-metre (13 ft), five-bladed variable pitch propellers. The ships also mount one bow thruster initially capable of 510 kW (680 hp) but was later improved to 1,300 kW (1,800 hp). This gives the ships a maximum speed of 20 knots (37 km/h; 23 mph) and a range of 6,000 nmi (11,000 km; 6,900 mi) at 12 knots (22 km/h; 14 mph). The ships have a 7-megawatt (9,400 hp) electric plant comprising four diesel generators capable of creating 1,520 kW (2,040 hp) and an emergency 715 kW (959 hp) generator.

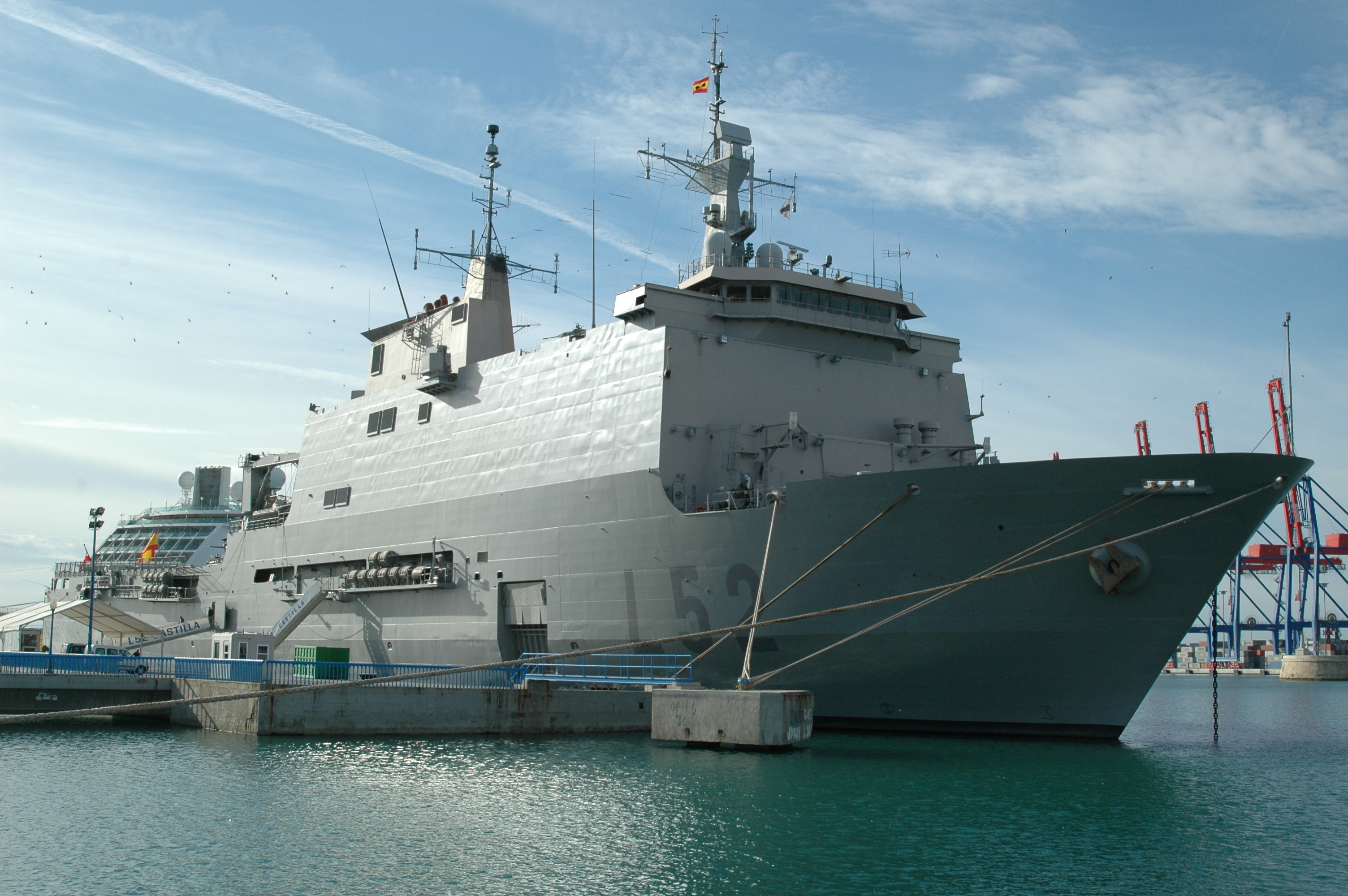
Castilla moored at Málaga in 2009

The Galicia class have a 60 by 25 m (197 by 82 ft) flight deck capable of operating helicopters. The vessels have hangar area for four heavy or six medium helicopters. The LPDs usually sail with six AB 212 or four SH-3D helicopters embarked. They have a 885 m^{2} (9,530 sq ft) well deck and are capable of operating six landing craft vehicle and personnel (LCVP) or four landing craft mechanized (LCM) or one landing craft utility and one LCVP. Normally, they operate with four LCM-1E craft. Within the ship there is 1,010 m^{2} (10,900 sq ft) of parking space for up to 130 armoured personnel carriers (APCs) or 33 main battle tanks (MBTs). However, a maximum of 170 vehicles can be carried depending on size. Both ships have capacity for 700 t (690 long tons) of ammunition and stores spread out within the 3,500 m^{2} (38,000 sq ft) of cargo space between the storerooms, flight deck and hangar. Castilla can transport 404 fully-equipped troops and 72 staff and aircrew. (Note: The official Spanish Navy website claims both ships can transport 615 troops.)

The LPDs are armed with two Oerlikon Contraves 20 mm (0.79 in) cannon but can be fitted with four. They also mount six Sippican Hycor SRBOC MK36 chaff launchers. The Galicia class is equipped with KH 1007 air/surface search radar and AN/TPX-54 (V) Mk-XII (mode 4) identification friend or foe. Castilla has a complement of 189. (Note: The official website of the Spanish Navy states both ships have a complement of 185.)

== Construction and career ==
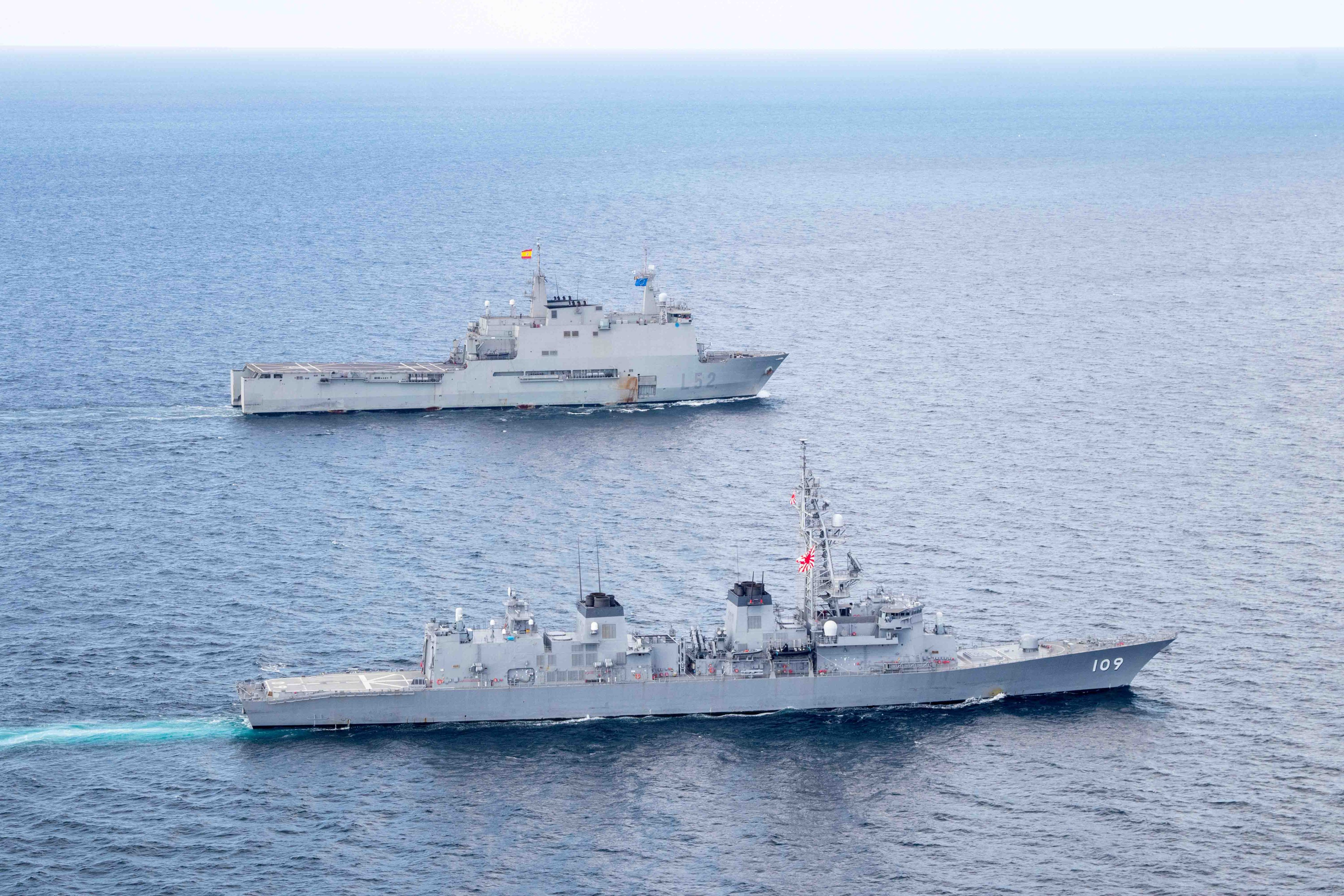
Castilla sailing with the Japanese destroyer JS Ariake in 2021

Ordered on 9 May 1997, the vessel's keel was laid down on 11 December 1997 at the Empresa Nacional Bazán shipyards in Ferrol. Named Castilla for the historic region of Spain, the LPD was launched on 14 June 1999 and was commissioned by the Spanish Navy (Armada Española) on 26 June 2000. She is the sister ship to Galicia and is home ported at Naval Station Rota.

Castilla participated in Operation Romeo Sierra in Perejil Island on 17 July 2002 during the Perejil Island crisis. The LPD took part in the cleanup following the wreck of the tanker Prestige and the resulting oil spill from December 2002 to February 2003. In 2002–2003 the ship underwent a refit that improved the vessel's command, control and communications capabilities. In July 2003, Castilla transported the Spanish Legion to Ash Shuahyabah, United Arab Emirates as part of Operation IF, returning in September. The ship was then sent to provide humanitarian aid to Haiti as part Operation Mar Caribe from October to December 2004.

On 28 October 2004, Castilla deployed to Cap-Haïtien, Haiti, and delivered some marines. Castilla participated in the NATO military exercise Operation Loyal Mariner 2005, as the flagship of the sea elements. Spain sent Castilla to New Orleans as part of NATO's Hurricane Katrina relief operation in Louisiana, in mid-September 2005. Castilla participated in the NATO exercises Operation Brilliant Mariner 2006, as the flagship of the sea elements, and the NATO exercise Operation Steadfast Jackpot 2006.

Spain dispatched Castilla on 22 January 2010 to aid in relief efforts after the 7.0 magnitude 12 January 2010 Haiti earthquake as part of Operación Hispaniola. The mission was announced on 19 January 2010, with the ship transporting a field hospital, 50 medical officers and 450 troops. Also on board were three helicopters, and several fast boats. Castilla left Naval Station Rota on 22 January, carrying 423 troops, and 4 helicopters, headed for Petit-Goâve, Haiti. On 1 February, Castilla arrived at San Juan, Puerto Rico to pick up additional supplies. On 4 February, Castilla arrived at Petit-Goâve. As of 5 February, landing craft from the ship began disgorging equipment. Castilla was expected to remain on-station at Petit-Goâve for three months.

On 10 May 2010, Castilla was tasked to assist the motor yacht Sagamar, with its 33-year-old injured crew member. The team from Castilla successfully extracted the injured, began medical treatment and disembarked him in the Azores for further medical treatment.

In February 2021, Castilla took the role of the flagship in European Union's Operation Atalanta, fighting piracy. It was the flagship for four months. It also conducted exercises with JS Ariake of the Japan Maritime Self-Defense Force.
