= Spanish ship Galicia (L51) =

Naval landing platform dock

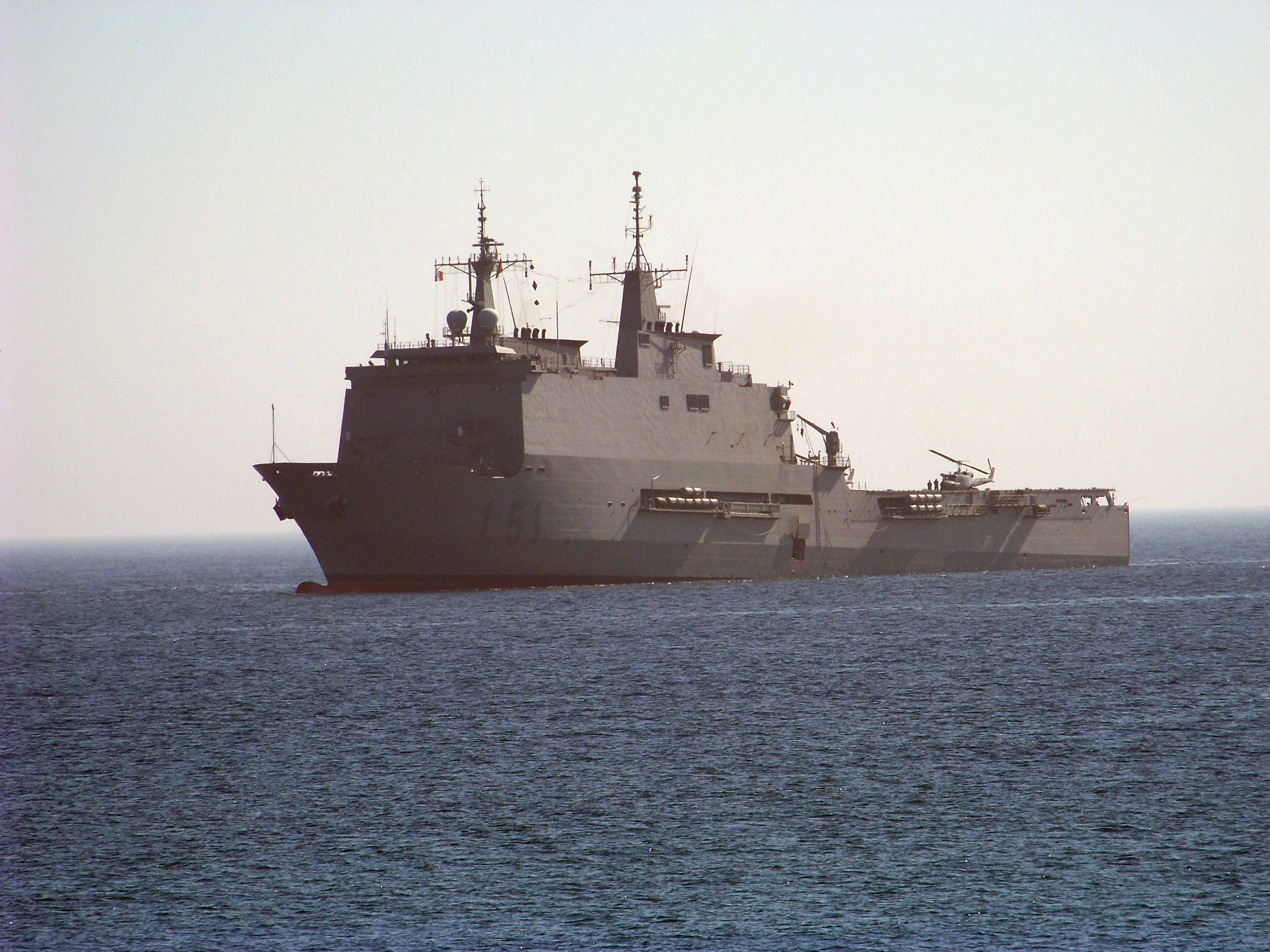
- Galicia during the celebration of Armed Forces Day in Santander (2009)

History

Spain
- Name: Galicia
- Namesake: Galicia
- Ordered: 29 July 1994
- Builder: Empresa Nacional Bazán
- Laid down: 31 May 1996
- Launched: 21 July 1997
- Commissioned: 30 April 1998
- Home port: Naval Station Rota
- Identification: Pennant number: L51
- Status: in active service

General characteristics
- Class & type: Galicia-class landing platform dock
- Displacement: 13,815 t (13,597 long tons; 15,228 short tons) full load
- Length: 160 m (524 ft 11 in) oa; 142 m (465 ft 11 in) pp
- Beam: 25 m (82 ft 0 in)
- Draught: 5.9 m (19 ft 4 in)
- Propulsion: 4 Bazan/Caterpillar 3612 diesel engines; 9,330 kW (12,512 hp), 2 shafts, 1 510 kW (680 hp) bow thruster
- Speed: 20 knots (37 km/h; 23 mph) maximum
- Range: 6,000 nmi (11,000 km; 6,900 mi) at 12 knots (22 km/h; 14 mph) in 3 weeks
- Boats & landing craft carried: 4 LCM-1E
- Capacity: 543 fully-equipped soldiers and 130 APCs or 33 MBTs
- Complement: 189
- Sensors & processing systems: DA08 air / surface search IRSCAN SATCOM, Link 1, JMCIS
- Armament: 4 Sippican Hycor SRBOC MK36 launchers; 2 × Oerlikon Contraves 20 mm (0.79 in) cannon
- Aircraft carried: 4 SH-3D or 6 AB 212 helicopters
- Aviation facilities: 60 m × 25 m (197 ft × 82 ft) flight deck, hangar

Galicia (L51) is a Galicia-class landing platform dock (LPD) of the Spanish Navy and is the seventh ship to bear this name. She is the lead ship in her class. The vessel was constructed in Ferrol, Spain and launched in 1997 and commissioned in 1998. Galicia is tasked with transporting Spanish marines, humanitarian aid missions and general logistic support. The LPD has taken part in actions against piracy in the Indian Ocean and off the Somalia coast, provided humanitarian aid following hurricanes and tsunamis and provided support during the COVID-19 pandemic in Spain.

== Design and description ==
The project began in the Netherlands in 1990 as that country sought a solution to their LPD requirements. Spain joined the project in July 1991 and the definition stage was completed by December 1993. The Galicia class spawned from the joint Enforcer design with Spain's lead ship being authorised on 29 July 1994. The LPDs were designed to transport a battalion of marines and disembark them offshore and general logistic support. Vessels of the class have a full load displacement of 13,815 t (13,597 long tons; 15,228 short tons). (Note: The Spanish Navy's website has the vessels at 13,000 t (13,000 long tons; 14,000 short tons).) The vessels measure 160 metres (524 ft 11 in) long overall and 142 m (465 ft 11 in) between perpendiculars with a beam of 25 m (82 ft 0 in) and a draught of 5.9 m (19 ft 4 in).

The LPDs are powered by four Bazan/Caterpillar 3612 diesel engines in two sets initially creating 9,330 kilowatts (12,512 hp) though this was later increased to 16,000 kW (22,000 hp), and an 1,100 kW (1,500 hp) electric generator tied to reduction gear. Each vessel has two shafts with 4-metre (13 ft), five-bladed variable pitch propellers. The ships also mount one bow thruster initially capable of 510 kW (680 hp) but was later improved to 1,300 kW (1,800 hp). This gives the ships a maximum speed of 20 knots (37 km/h; 23 mph) and a range of 6,000 nmi (11,000 km; 6,900 mi) at 12 knots (22 km/h; 14 mph). The ships have a 7-megawatt (9,400 hp) electric plant comprising four diesel generators capable of creating 1,520 kW (2,040 hp) and an emergency 715 kW (959 hp) generator.

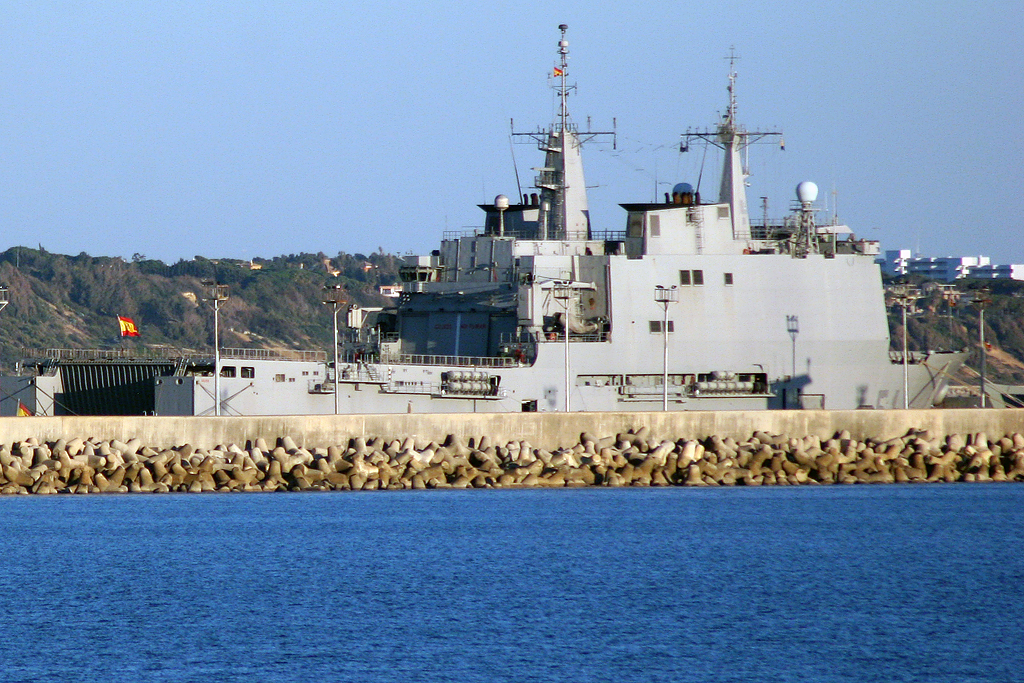
Galicia moored at Naval Station Rota in 2012

The Galicia class have a 60 by 25 m (197 by 82 ft) flight deck capable of operating helicopters. The vessels have hangar area for four heavy or six medium helicopters. The LPDs usually sail with six AB 212 or four SH-3D helicopters embarked. They have a 885 m^{2} (9,530 sq ft) well deck and are capable of operating six landing craft vehicle and personnel (LCVP) or four landing craft mechanized (LCM) or one landing craft utility and one LCVP. Normally, they operate with four LCM-1E craft. Within the ship there is 1,010 m^{2} (10,900 sq ft) of parking space for up to 130 armoured personnel carriers (APCs) or 33 main battle tanks (MBTs). However, a maximum of 170 vehicles can be carried depending on size. Both ships have capacity for 700 t (690 long tons) of ammunition and stores spread out within the 3,500 m^{2} (38,000 sq ft) of cargo space between the storerooms, flight deck and hangar. Galicia can transport 543 fully-equipped troops and 72 staff and aircrew. (Note: The official Spanish Navy website states Galicia can transport 615 troops.)

The LPDs are armed with two Oerlikon Contraves 20 mm (0.79 in) cannon but can be fitted with four. They also mount six Sippican Hycor SRBOC MK36 chaff launchers. The Galicia class is equipped with KH 1007 air/surface search radar and AN/TPX-54 (V) Mk-XII (mode 4) identification friend or foe. Galicia has a complement of 115 with capacity for an additional 12 personnel. (Note: The official website of the Spanish Navy states that Galicia has a complement of 185.)

== Construction and career ==
Ordered on 29 July 1994, the vessel's keel was laid down on 31 May 1996 at the Empresa Nacional Bazán shipyards in Ferrol. Named Galicia for the autonomous community of Spain, the LPD was launched on 21 July 1997 and was commissioned by the Spanish Navy (Armada Española) on 30 April 1998. She is the sister ship to Castilla (L52) and is home ported at Naval Station Rota.

Galicia performed humanitarian aid operations to Central America following Hurricane Mitch from November 1998 to January 1999. The vessel took part in the cleanup following the wreck of the tanker Prestige and the resulting oil spill from December 2002 to February 2003. From January to April 2005, Galicia was deployed to provide humanitarian aid in Iraq.

Galicia took part in Operation Respuesta Solidaria in Banda Aceh after the tsunami in northwestern Sumatra. This was followed by Operation Libre Hidalgo in support of United Nations peacekeeping in Lebanon. The LPD made two deployments, one in 2010 and another in 2011, as part of Operation Atalanta fighting piracy in the Indian Ocean and off the coast of Somalia. In April 2020, Galicia was deployed to Melilla, Spain to aid the city in the fight against COVID-19. In November 2024 Galicia was deployed to Valencia to assist relief efforts following catastrophic flooding.
