= Rotterdam-class landing platform dock =

Dutch class of landing platform dock ships

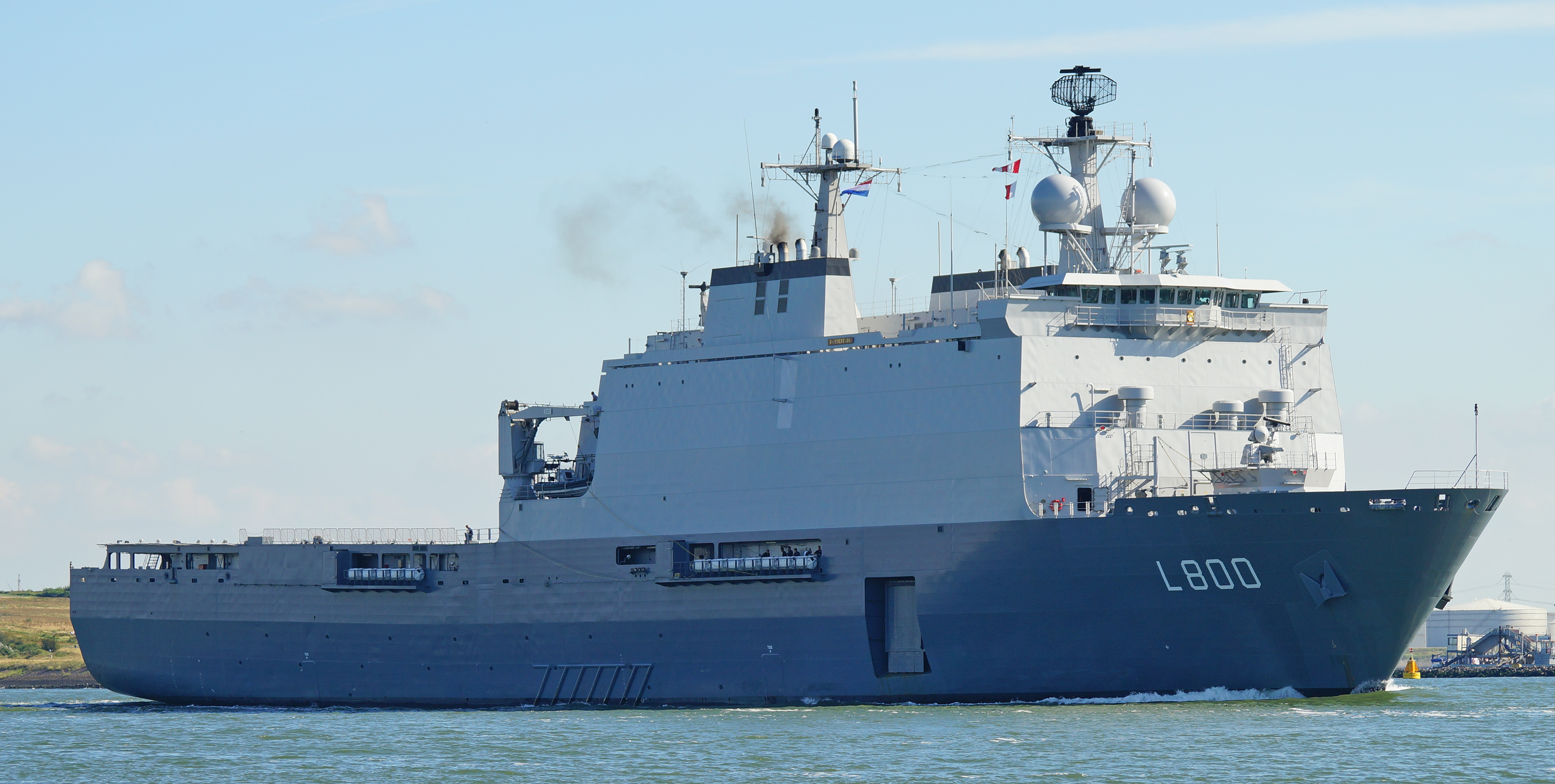
- Rotterdam on the Nieuwe Waterweg

Class overview
- Name: Rotterdam class
- Builders: Damen Schelde Naval Shipbuilding
- Operators: Royal Netherlands Navy
- Succeeded by: ATS class
- Cost: ƒ265m (Rotterdam); ƒ260m (Johan de Witt)
- Built: 1996–2007
- In commission: 1998–present
- Planned: 2
- Completed: 2
- Active: 2

General characteristics
- Type: Landing platform dock
- Displacement: 12,750 t (Rotterdam); 15,500 t (Johan de Witt)
- Length: 166 m (544 ft 7 in) (Rotterdam); 176.35 m (578 ft 7 in) (Johan de Witt)
- Beam: 27 m (88 ft 7 in) (Rotterdam); 29.2 m (95 ft 10 in) (Johan de Witt)
- Draft: 5.9 m (19 ft 4 in)
- Propulsion: Diesel-electric system; 4 × Stork Wärtsilä 12SW28 diesel generators at 14.6 MW; 4 × Holec electric motor (two in tandem per shaft) at 12 MW; 2 shafts; Bow thruster
- Speed: 19 knots (35 km/h; 22 mph)
- Range: 6,000 nmi (11,000 km; 6,900 mi) at 12 knots (22 km/h; 14 mph)
- Endurance: 6 weeks
- Boats & landing craft carried: 4 x LCVP; 2 × 7 m (23 ft) RHIB, up to 4 x LCVP, 2 × LCU or 1 × LCAC in welldock. (Johan de Witt)
- Capacity: 90 armoured personnel carriers or 32 main battle tanks (Rotterdam); 170 armoured personnel carriers or 33 main battle tanks (Johan de Witt)
- Troops: 595 marines (Rotterdam); 555 marines (Johan de Witt)
- Complement: 139 (Rotterdam); 146 (Johan de Witt)
- Sensors & processing systems: Thales Netherlands Variant 2D Combined air / surface radar; Thales Netherlands Gatekeeper E/O Warning system; SATCOM, Link 11, JMCIS
- Electronic warfare & decoys: 1 × AN/SLQ-25 Nixie torpedo decoy
- Armament: 2 × Goalkeeper CIWS guns; 8/10 × Browning 12.7 mm machine guns
- Aircraft carried: 4 × CH-47F Chinook or 6 × NH90 NFH helicopters
- Aviation facilities: Hangar and stern helicopter flight deck with two landing spots

The Rotterdam class are two landing platform dock (LPD) ships in service with the Royal Netherlands Navy. Built by Damen Schelde Naval Shipbuilding at Vlissingen, their mission is to carry out amphibious warfare by transporting the bulk of the Korps Mariniers. Each ship has both a large helicopter flight deck and a well deck for large landing craft, as well as space for up to 33 main battle tanks.

Rotterdam was commissioned in 1998 and Johan de Witt in 2007. Rotterdam and Johan de Witt are based at the Nieuwe Haven Naval Base in Den Helder, the Netherlands.

The class is the result of a joint project between Spain and the Netherlands for developing a common class of LPD that would fulfill the needs of both countries to replace older ships. This process produced the Enforcer design, which forms the basis of the Rotterdam class as well as the similar Galicia class and Bay class.

== Design and description ==
The project began in the Netherlands in 1990 as the Royal Netherlands Navy sought a solution to their LPD requirements. Spain joined the project in July 1991 and the definition stage was completed by December 1993. The Rotterdam class spawned from the joint Enforcer design with the Dutch lead ship being authorised on 29 July 1994. The LPDs were designed to transport a battalion of marines, disembark them offshore, and provide general logistic support.

The ships are equipped with a large helicopter deck for helicopter operations and a dock for large landing craft. The ships have a complete Echelon II hospital – a step above a first aid unit, but below a fully-functional hospital – including an operating theater and intensive care facilities with ten beds. A surgical team can be stationed on board. The ship also has a desalination system enabling it to convert seawater into drinking water.

== Ships in class ==
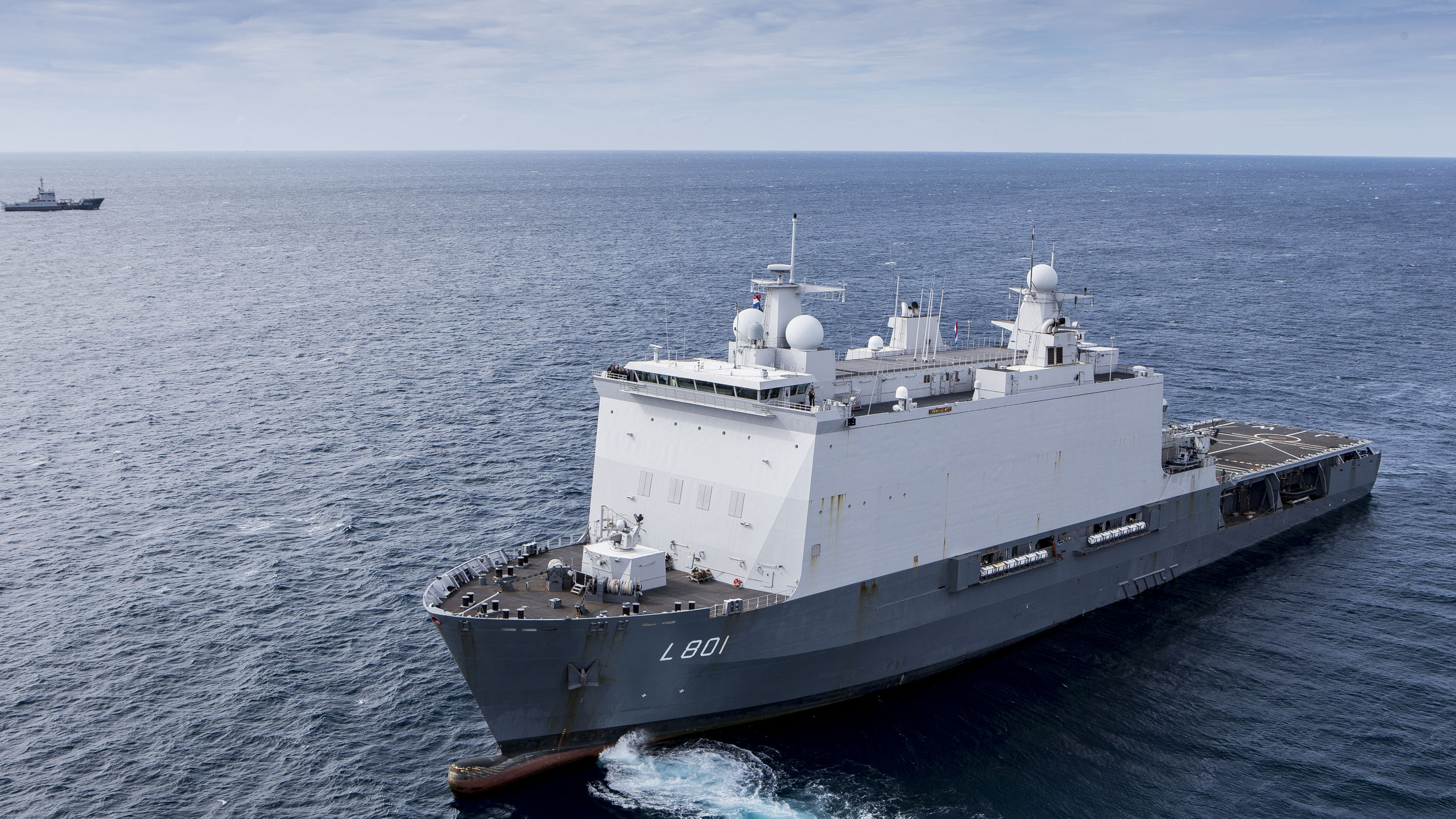
Johan de Witt and Snellius during Trident Juncture 15

Hull number	Name	Builder	Laid down	Launched	Commissioned	Status	Badge	Notes
L800	Rotterdam	Damen Schelde Naval Shipbuilding	23 February 1996	22 February 1997	18 April 1998	In active service		
L801	Johan de Witt	Damen Schelde Naval Shipbuilding	18 June 2003	13 May 2006	30 November 2007	In active service		

== Construction and career ==
The first ship, named Rotterdam, was ordered in April 1994 and laid down by Damen Schelde Naval Shipbuilding at their shipyard in Vlissingen, the Netherlands on 23 February 1996. The second vessel, named Johan de Witt, was ordered in May 2002 and laid down on 18 June 2003. Rotterdam was commissioned on 22 February 1997 and Johan de Witt on 30 November 2007. Both ships are based at Nieuwe Haven Naval Base, Den Helder.

In October 2012, while serving as the flagship for Operation Ocean Shield, Rotterdam sank a suspected Somali pirate ship off the east coast of Africa. Rotterdam came under sustained attack from shore based weapons while rescuing the crew of the sunken ship and sustained damage to one of her small boats.

In September 2019 Johan de Witt and Snellius were sent to the Bahamas for humanitarian aid after the country was hit by Hurricane Dorian. The ships loaded supplies like food, water and medicines at the island of Sint Maarten before continuing to the Bahamas.

== Replacement ==
In March 2024 it was reported that the Dutch Ministry of Defence is planning to replace the two Rotterdam-class LPDs and the four Holland-class OPVs with a single class consisting of six ships. The new ship class is officially designated Amphibious Transport Ships (Dutch: Amfibisch Transportschip; ATS). They will be built by Damen Group and it is also expected that several other Dutch companies will be involved. During the development of the ships the Netherlands will work together with the United Kingdom. In 2023 both countries signed a statement of intent to cooperate.

== See also ==
Equivalent amphibious warfare ships of the same era

- Foudre class
- Albion class
- Galicia class
- Harpers Ferry class
- Ōsumi class
