= HNLMS Johan de Witt =

Dutch Landing Platform Dock

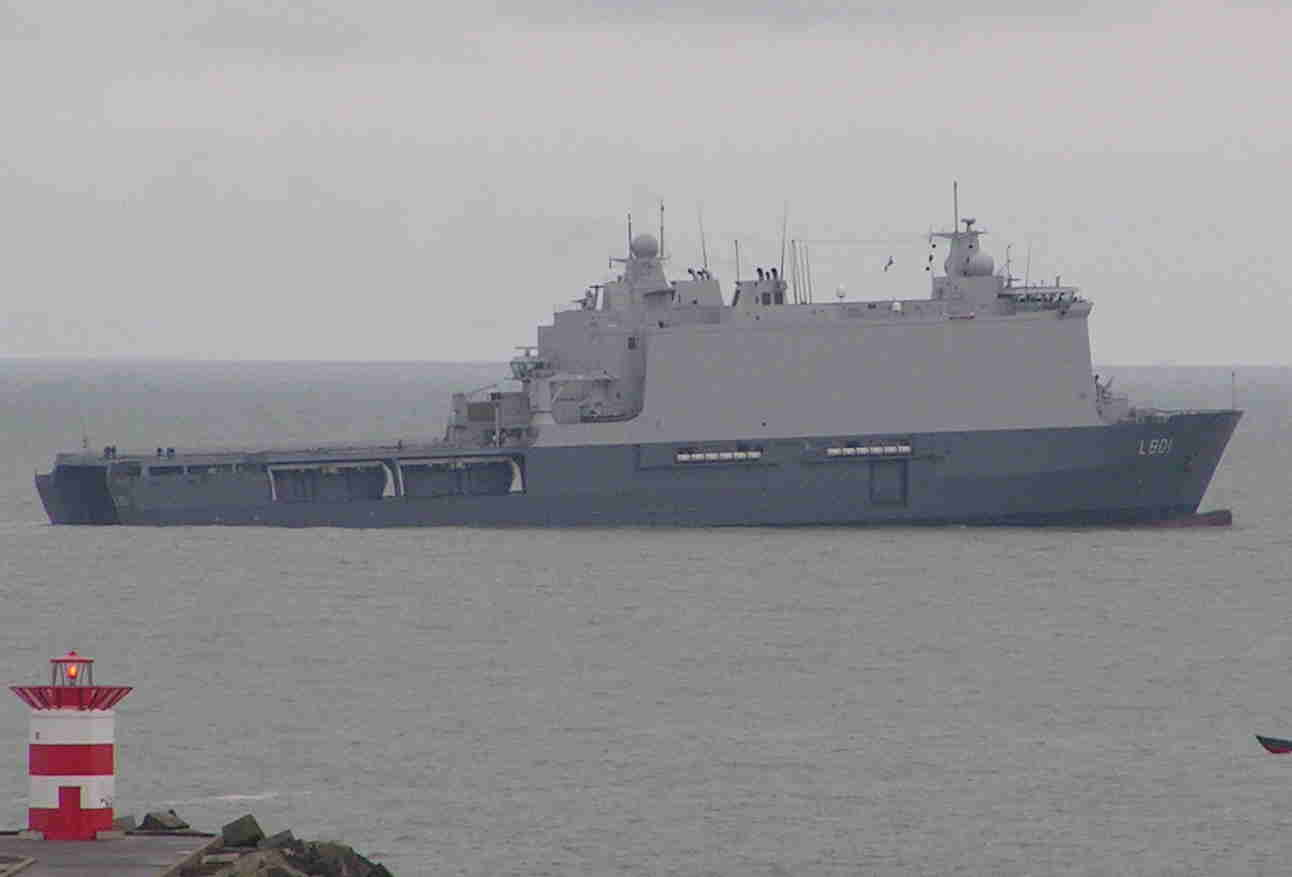
- HNLMS Johan de Witt with welldock submersed

History

Netherlands
- Name: Johan de Witt
- Namesake: Johan de Witt
- Operator: Royal Netherlands Navy
- Builder: Damen Shipyards Galați, Romania; Damen Schelde Naval Shipbuilding, Netherlands (fitting out)
- Cost: ƒ260m
- Laid down: 18 June 2003
- Launched: 13 May 2006
- Commissioned: 30 November 2007
- Home port: Den Helder
- Identification: IMO number: 9280768; MMSI number: 244527000; Callsign: PAJW; Deck code: JW
- Motto: Ago Quod Ago; (I do what I do)
- Status: in active service
- Badge

General characteristics
- Type: Rotterdam-class landing platform dock
- Displacement: 16,800 t full
- Length: 176.35 m (578 ft 7 in)
- Beam: 29 m (95 ft 2 in)
- Draught: 6 m (19 ft 8 in)
- Propulsion: Diesel-electric system; 4 × Stork Wärtsilä 14,800 kW (19,800 hp) with Podded Propulsion; bow thruster
- Speed: 19 knots (35 km/h; 22 mph)
- Range: 6,000 nautical miles (11,000 km; 6,900 mi) at 12 knots (22 km/h; 14 mph)
- Endurance: 6 weeks
- Boats & landing craft carried: 2 × 7 m (23 ft) RHIB; Up to 4 x LCVP or 12 m (39 ft) RHIB; 2 × LCU in welldock; Provisions for Combat Boat 90's.; Can also accommodate LCACs
- Capacity: 170 armoured personnel carriers or 33 main battle tanks
- Troops: 555 marines
- Complement: 146
- Sensors & processing systems: Thales Netherlands Variant 2D Combined air / surface radar; Thales Netherlands Gatekeeper E/O Warning system; SATCOM, Link 11, JMCIS
- Electronic warfare & decoys: 4 x Sippican Hycor SRBOC MK36 launcher
- Armament: 2 × Goalkeeper CIWS; 4-6 x Browning .50 and FN MAG machine guns
- Aircraft carried: 6 x NH90 NFH or 6 x H215M Cougar or 4 x CH-47F Chinook helicopters
- Aviation facilities: Hangar and stern helicopter flight deck with two landing spots

HNLMS Johan de Witt (Dutch: Zr.Ms. Johan de Witt) is the second Rotterdam-class landing platform dock of the Royal Netherlands Navy. It is an improved design of Rotterdam, which was designed in conjunction between the Netherlands and Spain. The ship, displacing 16,800 tons, was launched on 13 May 2006. The motto of the ship is Ago Quod Ago, translated as I do what I do.

== Design ==
=== Equipment ===
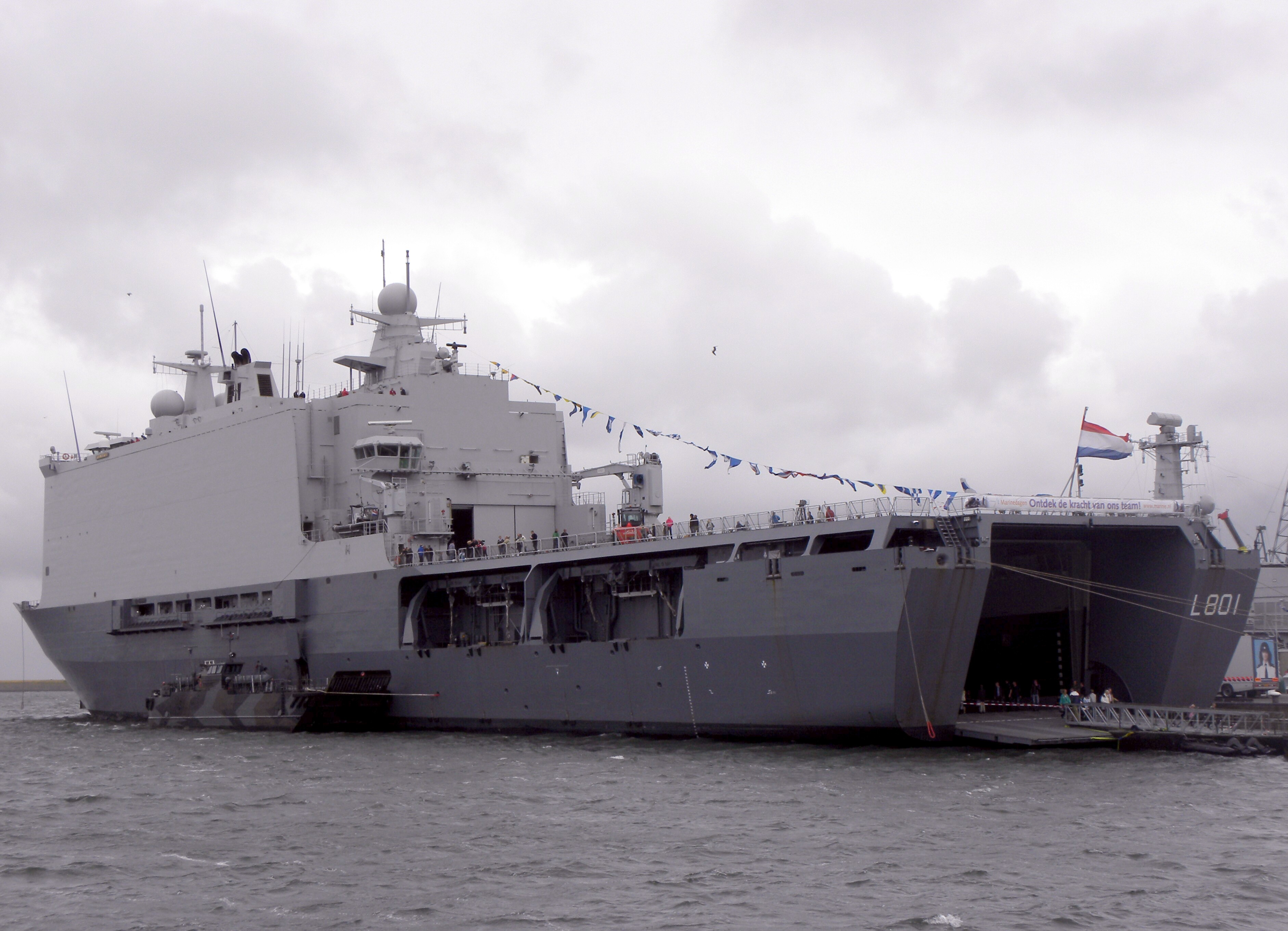
Johan de Witt, disembarked Landing craft utility and two empty LCVP davits

The ship is equipped with a large helicopter deck for helicopter operations and a dock for large landing craft. It can carry six NH90 NFH helicopters or four CH-47F Chinook helicopters. It has a well dock for two landing craft utility and it carries four davit-launched LCVPs. The dock is wide enough to support two LCAC, but to allow for this, the centre barrier, that splits the dockwell in two, must be removed.

The vessel has an extra deck with rooms for command staff to support a battalion size operation. The ship has a complete Role II hospital, including an operating theatre and intensive care facilities. A surgical team can be stationed on board. The ship also has a desalination system enabling it to convert seawater into drinking water.

It is equipped with pod propulsion enabling the ship to use dynamic positioning while sea basing.

=== Sensors and armament ===
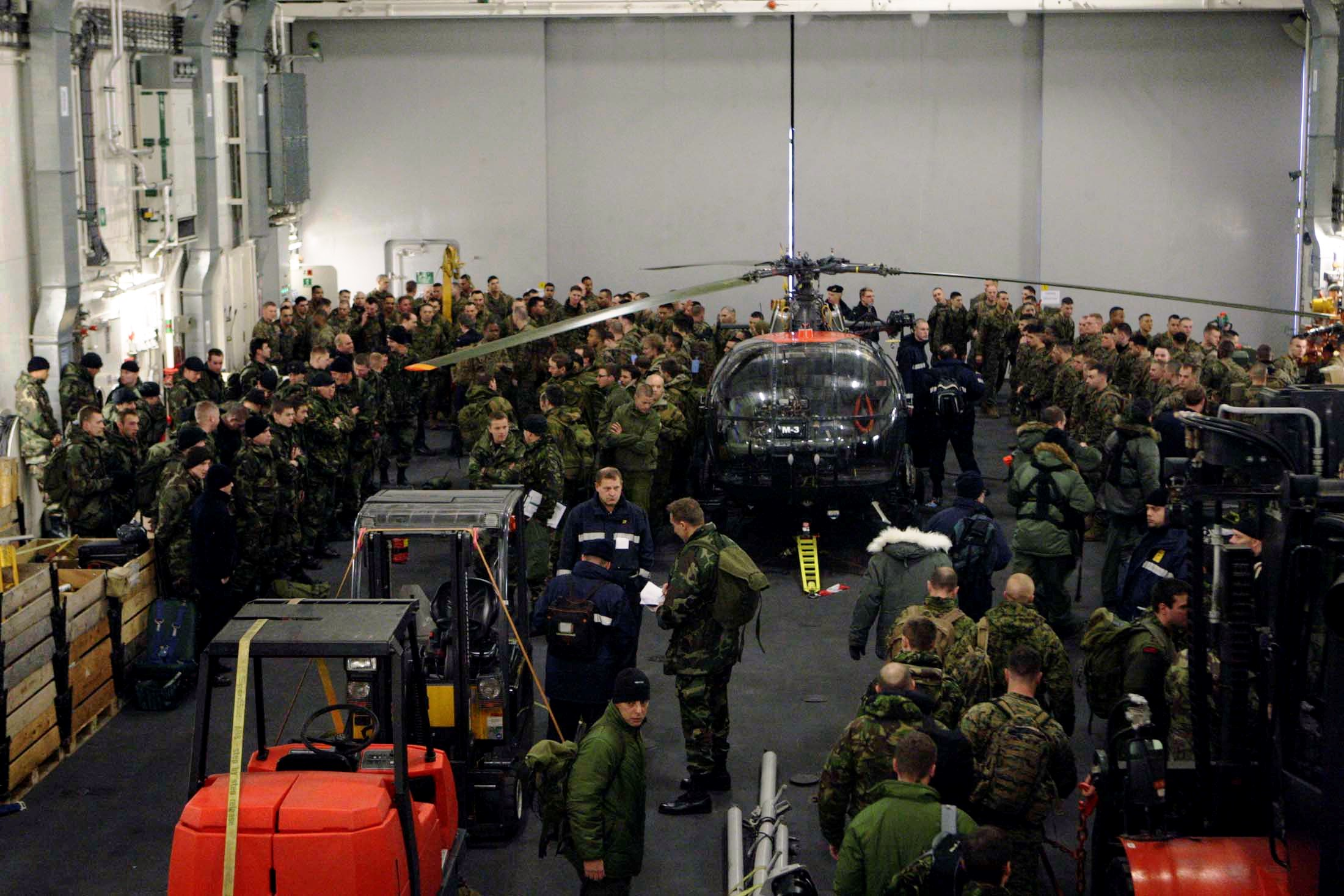
Johan de Witt aviation hangar

The sensor suite consists of a Thales Netherlands Variant 2D Air and Surface surveillance radar, the Thales Scout Low Probability of Intercept Surface surveillance and tactical navigation radar and the Thales GateKeeper Electro-Optical warning system.

When participating in high-risk operations Johan de Witt needs additional protection from frigates or destroyers. For protection against incoming anti-ship missiles or hostile aircraft and swarm attacks the ship has two Goalkeeper CIWS systems and 4-6 manual operated .50 Browning or FN Mag machine guns

== Service history ==
Johan de Witt's home port is in Den Helder. The ship has participated twice (2010 and 2013) in anti-piracy operations off the coast of Somalia, where it successfully disrupted pirate activities and patrolled the coast with the landing craft functioning as forward operating bases. Johan de Witt also supported the locals with medical assistance and supplying food and water.

In October 2015 the ship participated in the NATO exercise Trident Juncture held close to Spain. In 2016 Johan de Witt took part in a joint Dutch-British exercise called Cold Response. Later that year she would participate in a joint German-Finnish-Swedish-Dutch exercise called BALTOPS. After this exercise she returned to the Netherlands for maintenance that would last a year. In the autumn of 2018 the ship would participate in the NATO exercise Trident Juncture.

In September 2019 Johan de Witt and Snellius were sent to the Bahamas for humanitarian aid after the country was hit by Hurricane Dorian. The ships loaded supplies like food, water and medicines at the island of Sint Maarten before continuing to the Bahamas.

On 6 September 2025 Johan de Witt departed Den Helder to replace De Ruyter as flagship of Standing NATO Maritime Group 1 (SNMG1). She will serve in this role for a duration of two and a half months. In October Johan de Witt took part in Merlin Trident 2025. In her role as flagship of SNMG1 she took part in patrols and trained with allies and partners.

On 10 November Johan de Witt was replaced by Van Amstel as flagship of SNMG1 in Stockholm. After being replaced she is expected to arrive in Den Helder on 14 November.

In Early February 2026 Johan de Witt was frequently seen at Marsdiep. That same month it was also announced that the ship would participate in the upcoming NATO mission Arctic Sentry.

In March 2026 Johan de Witt took part in the military exercise Cold Response. During the exercise, it served as base for amphibious landings.

== See also ==
- Galicia-class landing platform dock
- HNLMS Rotterdam (L800)
