= Galicia-class landing platform dock =

Ship class

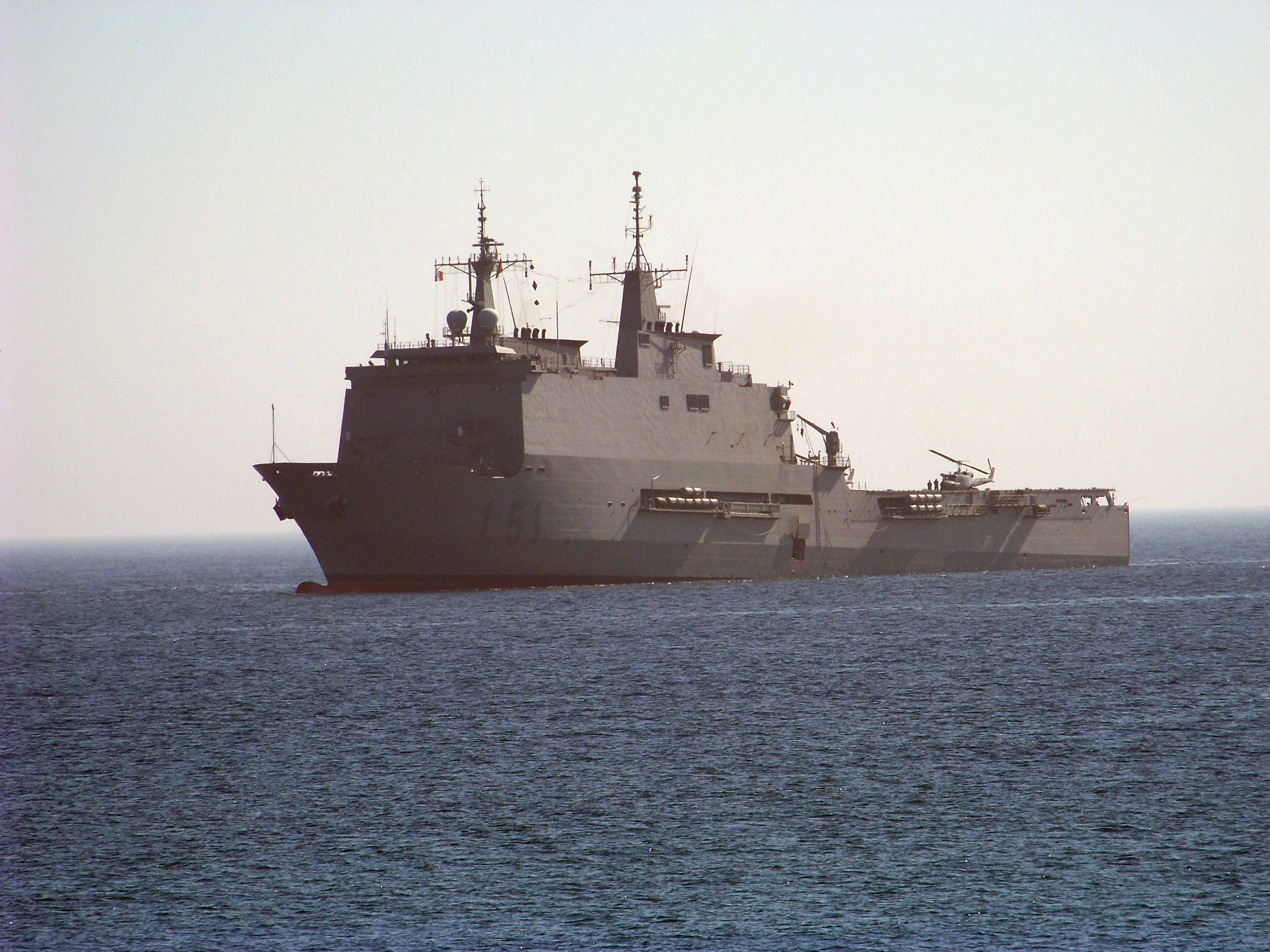
- Galicia near Santander in 2009

Class overview
- Name: Galicia class
- Builders: Navantia
- Operators: Spanish Navy
- Cost: $132 million
- Completed: 2
- Active: 2

General characteristics
- Type: Landing platform dock
- Displacement: 13,815 t (13,597 long tons) full load
- Length: 160 m (524 ft 11 in) oa; 142 m (465 ft 11 in) pp
- Beam: 25 m (82 ft 0 in)
- Draught: 5.9 m (19 ft 4 in)
- Propulsion: 4 Bazan/Caterpillar 3612 diesel engines; 9,330 kW (12,512 hp), 2 shafts, 1 510 kW (680 hp) bow thruster
- Speed: 20 knots (37 km/h; 23 mph) maximum
- Range: 6,000 nmi (11,000 km; 6,900 mi) at 12 knots (22 km/h; 14 mph)
- Boats & landing craft carried: 4 LCM-1E
- Capacity: 543 fully-equipped soldiers and 130 APCs or 33 MBTs
- Complement: 189
- Sensors & processing systems: DA08 air / surface search IRSCAN SATCOM, Link 1, JMCIS
- Armament: 4 Sippican Hycor SRBOC MK36 launchers; 2 × Oerlikon Contraves 20 mm (0.79 in) cannon
- Aircraft carried: 4 SH-3D or 6 AB 212 helicopters
- Aviation facilities: 60 m × 25 m (197 ft × 82 ft) flight deck, hangar

The Galicia class are two landing platform dock (LPD) ships in service with the Spanish Navy. Built by Navantia at Ferrol, their mission is to carry out amphibious warfare by transporting the bulk of the Infantería de Marina. These ships have both a large helicopter flight deck and a 885-square-metre (9,530 sq ft) well deck for large landing craft, as well as a 1,000-square-metre (11,000 sq ft) space for up to 33 main battle tanks.

Galicia was commissioned in 1998 and Castilla in 2000. Galicia and Castilla are based at the Rota naval base in Spain.

The class is the result of a joint project between Spain and the Netherlands for developing a common class of LPD that would fulfill the needs of both countries to replace older ships. This process produced the Enforcer design, which forms the basis of the Galicia class as well as the similar Royal Netherlands Navy Rotterdam class and British Royal Fleet Auxiliary Bay class.

== Design and description ==
The project began in the Netherlands in 1990, as that country sought a solution to their LPD requirements. Spain joined the project in July 1991, and the definition stage was completed by December 1993. The Galicia class spawned from the joint Enforcer design with Spain's lead ship being authorised on 29 July 1994. The LPDs were designed to transport a battalion of marines and disembark them offshore and general logistic support. Vessels of the class have a full load displacement of 13,815 t (13,597 long tons; 15,228 short tons). (Note: The Spanish Navy's website has the vessels at 13,000 t (13,000 long tons; 14,000 short tons).) The vessels measure 160 metres (524 ft 11 in) long overall and 142 m (465 ft 11 in) between perpendiculars with a beam of 25 m (82 ft 0 in) and a draught of 5.9 m (19 ft 4 in).

The LPDs are powered by four Bazan/Caterpillar 3612 diesel engines in two sets initially creating 9,330 kilowatts (12,512 hp) though this was later increased to 16,000 kW (22,000 hp), and an 1,100 kW (1,500 hp) electric generator tied to reduction gear. Each vessel has two shafts with 4-metre (13 ft), five-bladed variable pitch propellers. The ships also mount one bow thruster initially capable of 510 kW (680 hp) but was later improved to 1,300 kW (1,800 hp). This gives the ships a maximum speed of 20 knots (37 km/h; 23 mph) and a range of 6,000 nmi (11,000 km; 6,900 mi) at 12 knots (22 km/h; 14 mph). The ships have a 7-megawatt (9,400 hp) electric plant comprising four diesel generators capable of creating 1,520 kW (2,040 hp) and an emergency 715 kW (959 hp) generator.

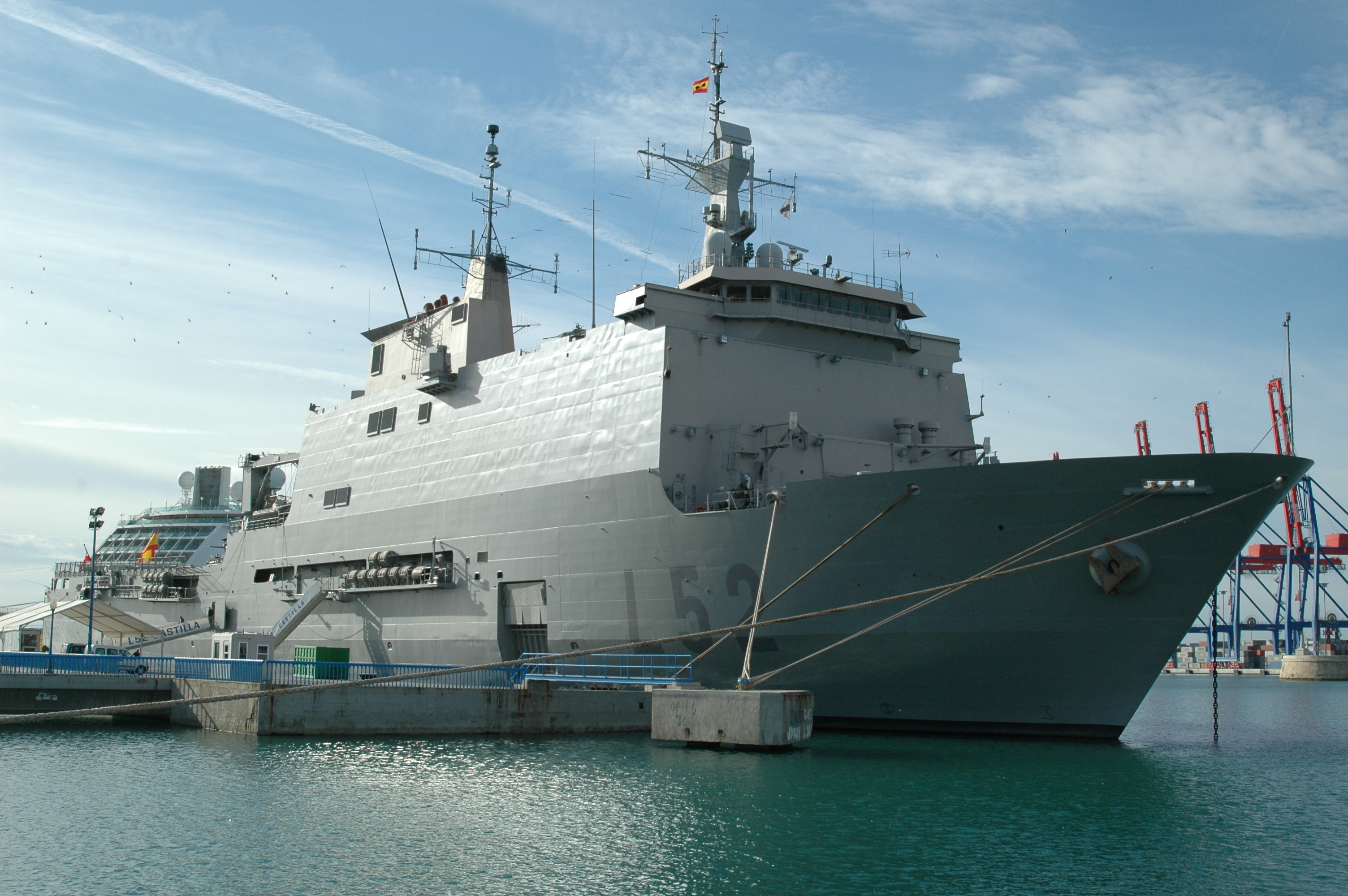
Castilla moored at Málaga in 2009

The Galicia class have a 60 by 25 m (197 by 82 ft) flight deck capable of operating helicopters. The vessels have hangar area for four heavy or six medium helicopters. They have a 885 m^{2} (9,530 sq ft) well deck and are capable of operating six landing craft vehicle and personnel (LCVP) or four landing craft mechanized (LCM) or one landing craft utility and one LCVP. Normally, they operate with four LCM-1E craft. Within the ship there is 1,010 m^{2} (10,900 sq ft) of parking space for up to 130 armoured personnel carriers (APCs) or 33 main battle tanks (MBTs). However, a maximum of 170 vehicles can be carried depending on size. Both ships have capacity for 700 t (690 long tons) of ammunition and stores spread out within the 3,500 m^{2} (38,000 sq ft) of cargo space between the storerooms, flight deck and hangar. Galicia can transport 543 fully-equipped troops and 72 staff and aircrew. Castilla can transport 404 fully-equipped troops and 72 staff and aircrew. (Note: The official Spanish Navy website claims both ships can transport 615 troops.)

The LPDs are armed with two Oerlikon Contraves 20 mm (0.79 in) cannon but can be fitted with four. They also mount six Sippican Hycor SRBOC MK36 chaff launchers. The Galicia class is equipped with KH 1007 air/surface search radar and AN/TPX-54 (V) Mk-XII (mode 4) identification friend or foe. Galicia has a complement of 115 with capacity for an additional 12 personnel. Castilla has a complement of 189. (Note: The official website of the Spanish Navy states both ships have a complement of 185.)

== Ships in class ==
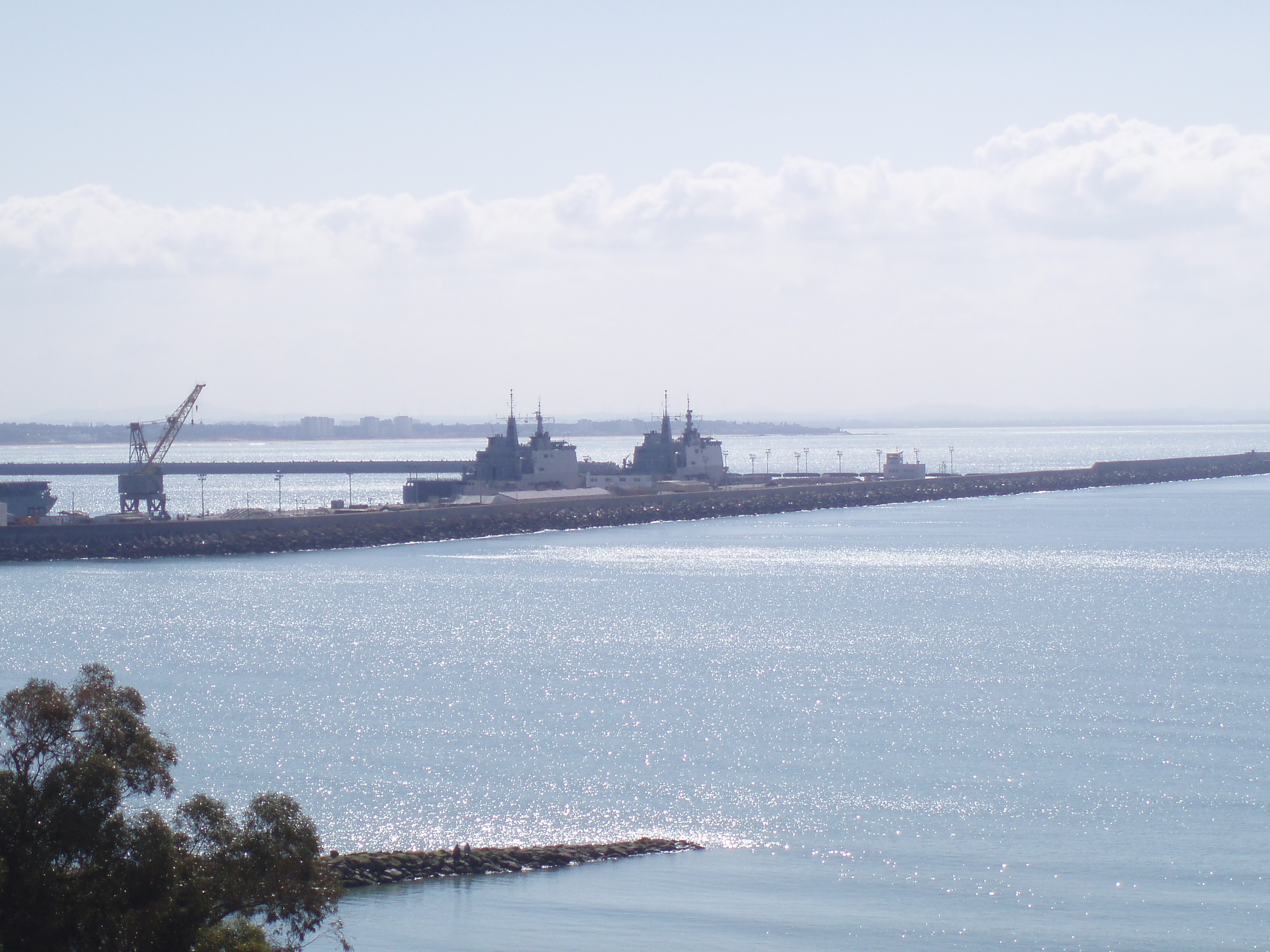
Galicia and Castilla moored at Naval Station Rota in 2008

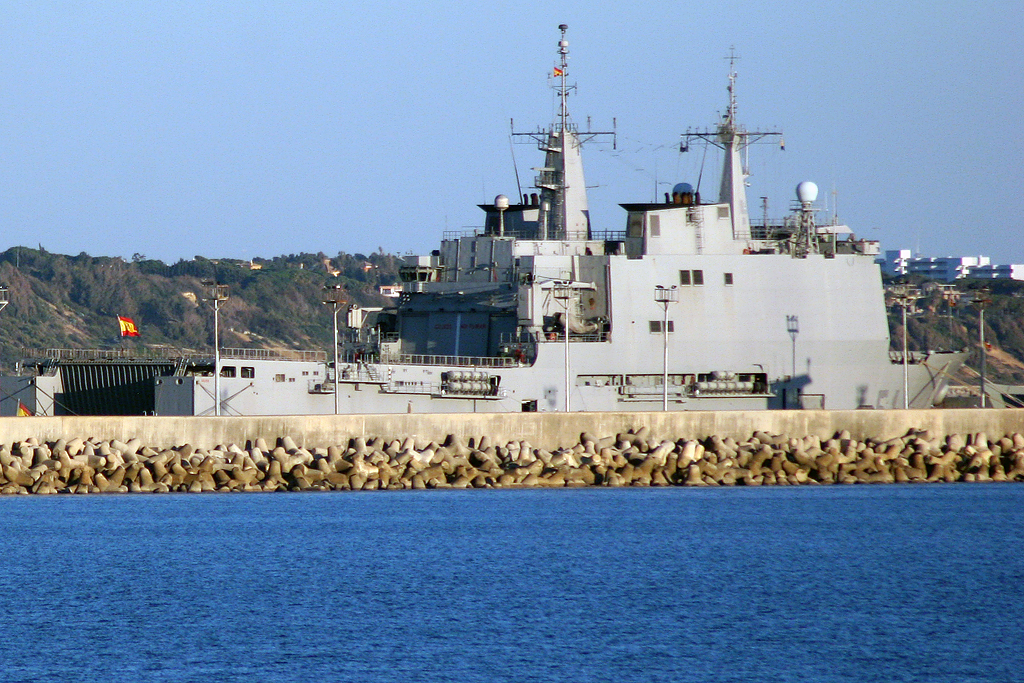
Galicia moored at Naval Station Rota in 2012

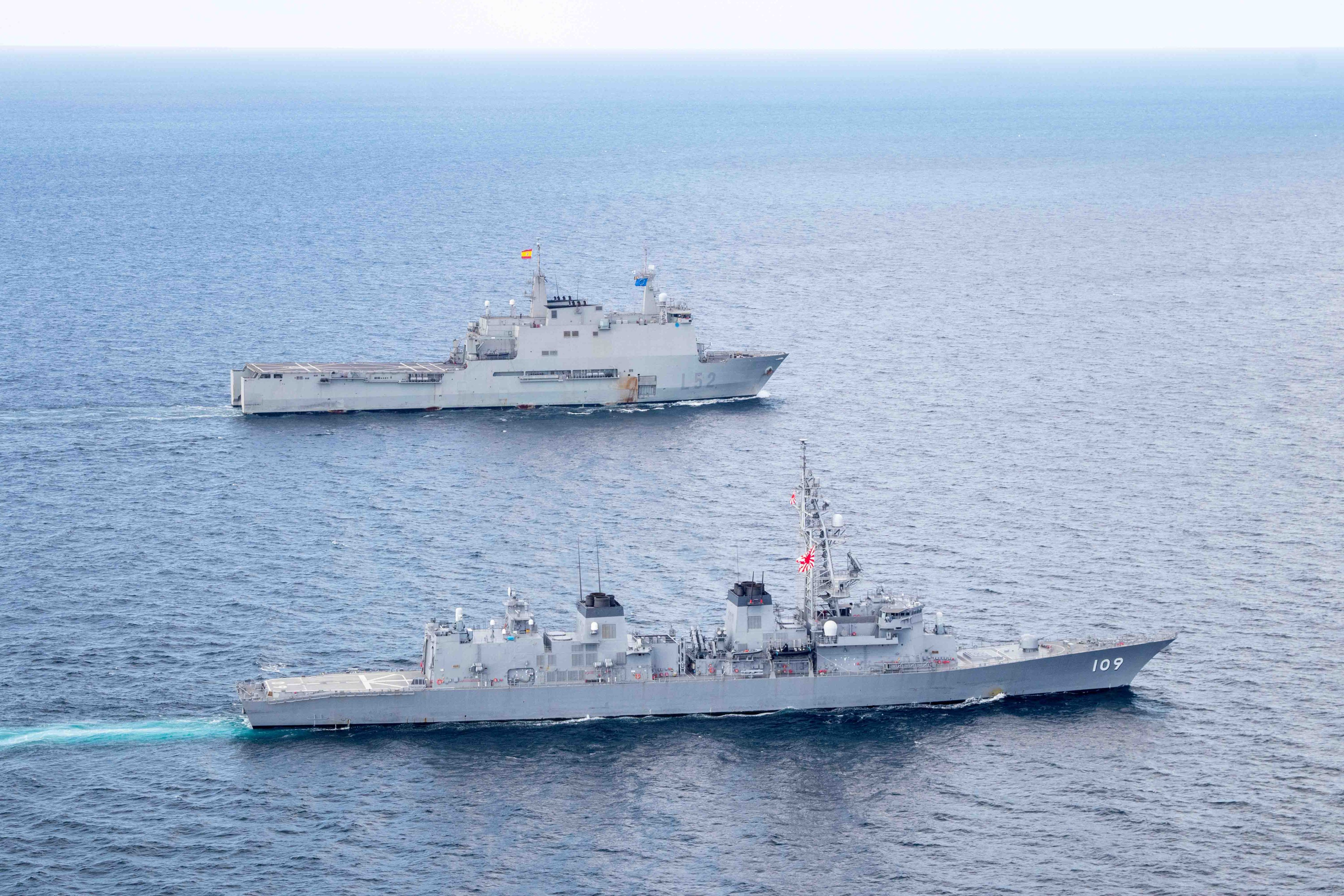
Castilla sailing with the Japanese destroyer JS Ariake in 2021

Galicia class
Hull number	Name	Builder	Laid down	Launched	Commissioned	Status
L51	Galicia	Bazán (later Navantia), Ferrol, Spain	31 May 1996	21 July 1997	30 April 1998	In active service
L52	Castilla	Bazán (later Navantia), Ferrol, Spain	11 December 1997	14 June 1999	26 June 2000	In active service

== Construction and career ==
The first ship, named Galicia, was ordered in July 1994 and laid down by Bazán (later Navantia) at their shipyard in Ferrol, Spain on 31 May 1996. The second vessel, named Castilla, was ordered on 9 May 1997 and laid down on 11 December. Galicia commissioned on 30 April 1998 and Castilla on 26 June 2000. Both ships are based at Rota naval base.

Galicia performed humanitarian aid operations to Central America following Hurricane Mitch from November 1998 to January 1999. Castilla participated in Operation Romeo Sierra in Perejil Island on 17 July 2002. Both vessels took part in the cleanup following the wreck of the tanker Prestige and the resulting oil spill from December 2002 to February 2003. In 2002–2003 Castilla underwent a refit that improved the vessel's command, control and communications capabilities. In July 2003, Castilla transported the Spanish Legion to Ash Shuahyabah, United Arab Emirates as part of Operation IF, returning in September. The ship was then sent to provide humanitarian aid to Haiti as part Operation Mar Caribe from October to December 2004. From January to April 2005, Galicia was deployed to provide humanitarian aid in Iraq.

Galicia took part in Operation Respuesta Solidaria in Banda Aceh after the tsunami in northwestern Sumatra. This was followed by Operation Libre Hidalgo in support of United Nations peacekeeping in Lebanon. The LPD made two deployments, one in 2010 and another in 2011, as part of Operation Atalanta fighting piracy in the Indian Ocean and off the coast of Somalia. In April 2020, Galicia was deployed to Melilla, Spain to aid the city in the fight against COVID-19.

== See also ==
Equivalent amphibious warfare ships of the same era

- Rotterdam class
- Albion class
- Foudre class
- Harpers Ferry class
- Ōsumi class
