= JS Ariake (DD-109) =

Destroyer of the Japan Maritime Self-Defense Force

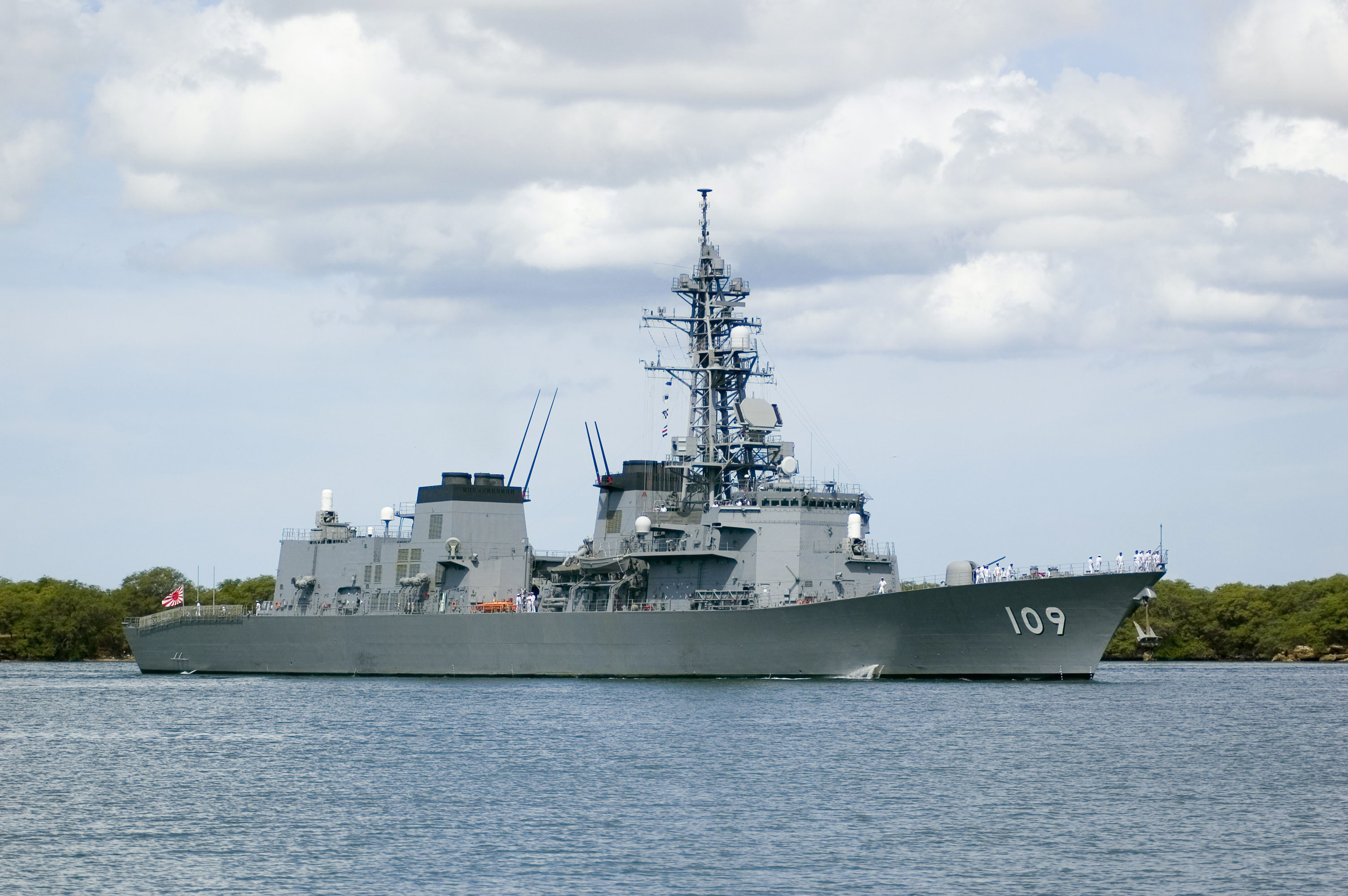
- JS Ariake on 23 June 2006

History

Japan
- Name: Ariake; (ありあけ)
- Ordered: 1997
- Builder: Mitsubishi, Kobe
- Laid down: 18 May 1999
- Launched: 16 October 2000
- Commissioned: 6 March 2002
- Home port: Sasebo
- Identification: MMSI number: 431999655; Pennant number: DD-109
- Status: Active

General characteristics
- Class & type: Murasame-class destroyer
- Displacement: 4,550 tons standard, 6,200 tons hull load
- Length: 151 m (495 ft 5 in)
- Beam: 17.4 m (57 ft 1 in)
- Draft: 5.2 m (17 ft 1 in)
- Propulsion: 2 × IHI-GE LM2500 gas turbines; 2 × KHI-RR SM1C gas turbines; 60,000 shp (45 MW); 2 shafts, cp props
- Speed: 30 knots (35 mph; 56 km/h)
- Complement: 165
- Sensors & processing systems: OYQ-9 CDS (w/ Link-11); OYQ-103 ASWCS; FCS-2-31 fire-control systems; OPS-24B air search radar; OPS-28 surface search radar; OQS-5 hull sonar; OQR-2 TASS
- Electronic warfare & decoys: NOLQ-3 suite; Mk. 36 SRBOC Chaff and Decoy Launching System; AN/SLQ-25 torpedo decoys
- Armament: 1 × OTO Melara 76 mm gun; 2 × 20 mm Phalanx CIWS; 8 × SSM-1B Anti-ship missile in quad canisters; 2 × triple 324 mm torpedo tubes; 16-cell Mk. 48 VLS with Evolved Sea Sparrow SAM; 16-cell Mk. 41 VLS with VL-ASROC
- Aircraft carried: 1 × SH-60J/K anti-submarine helicopter

JS Ariake (DD-109) (ありあけ) is the ninth ship of Murasame-class destroyers. She was commissioned on 6 March 2002.

== Design ==
The hull design was completely renovated from first-generation DDs. In addition to increasing the size in order to reduce the underwater radiation noise, both superstructure and hull was inclined to reduce the radar cross-section. There is however no angled tripod mainmast like that of the American Arleigh Burke-class destroyer because of the heavy weather of the Sea of Japan in winter. The aft was designed like a "mini-Oranda-zaka" as with the Kongō class to avoid interference between helicopters and mooring devices. Destroyers built under the First Defense Build-up Plan, including the former Murasame class, adopted a unique long forecastle style called "Oranda-zaka".

The engine arrangement is COGAG as same as Asagiri class, but a pair of engines are updated to Spey SM1C. And the remaining pair are replaced by LM2500, same as Kongō class.

== Construction and career ==
Ariake was laid down on 18 May 1999 at Mitsubishi Heavy Industries in Kobe as part of the 1997 plan and launched on 16 October 2000. Commissioned on 6 March 2002, the vessel was incorporated into the 6th Escort Corps of the 2nd Escort Corps and deployed to Sasebo.

On 13 September 2020, she departed from Sasebo base for the Gulf of Aden off the coast of Somalia as the 37th dispatched anti-piracy action water squadron.

The ship participated in Exercise Malabar 2024 which was held from 8 to 18 October.

== Gallery ==
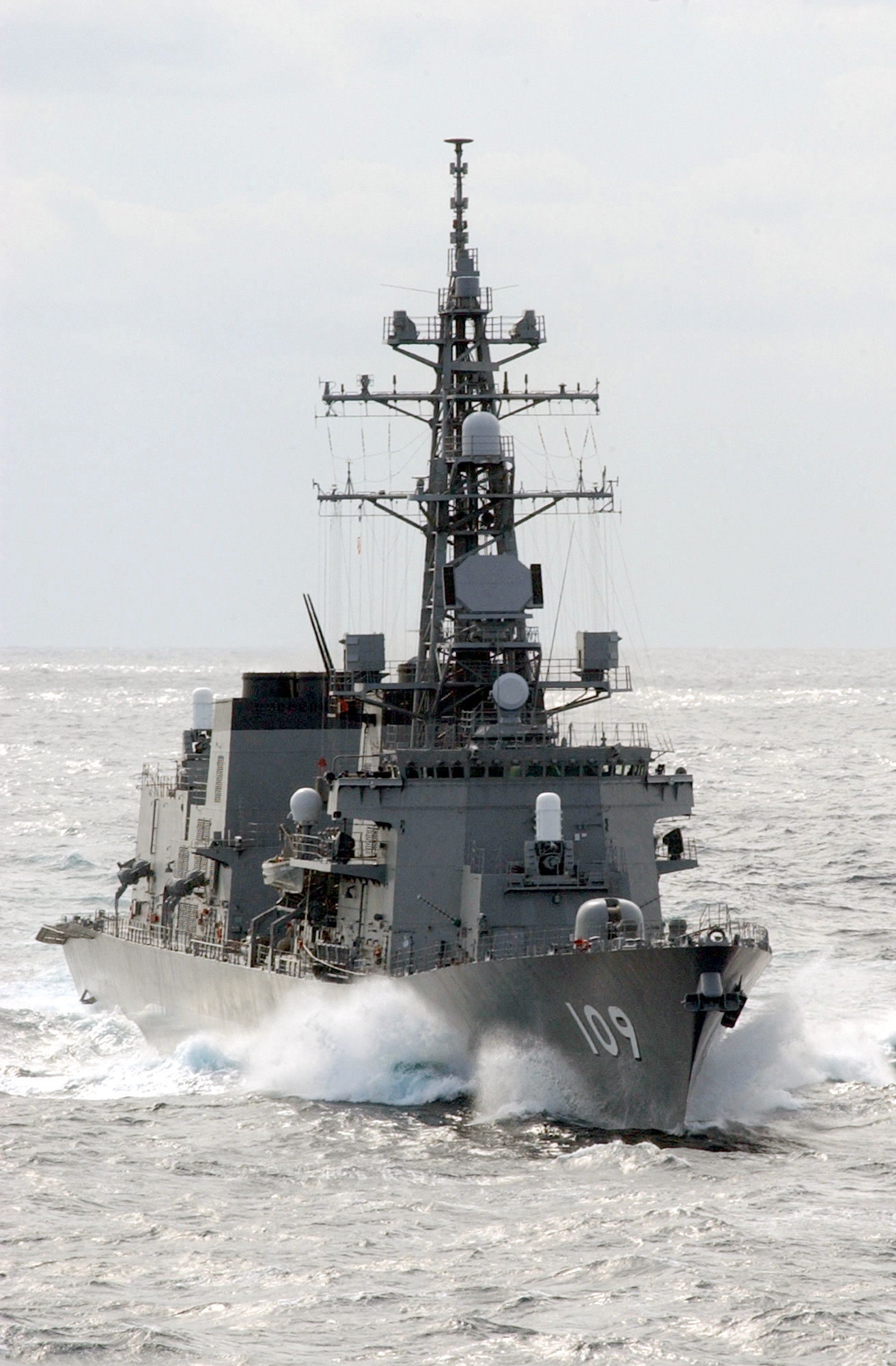
JS Ariake underway on 16 November 2002

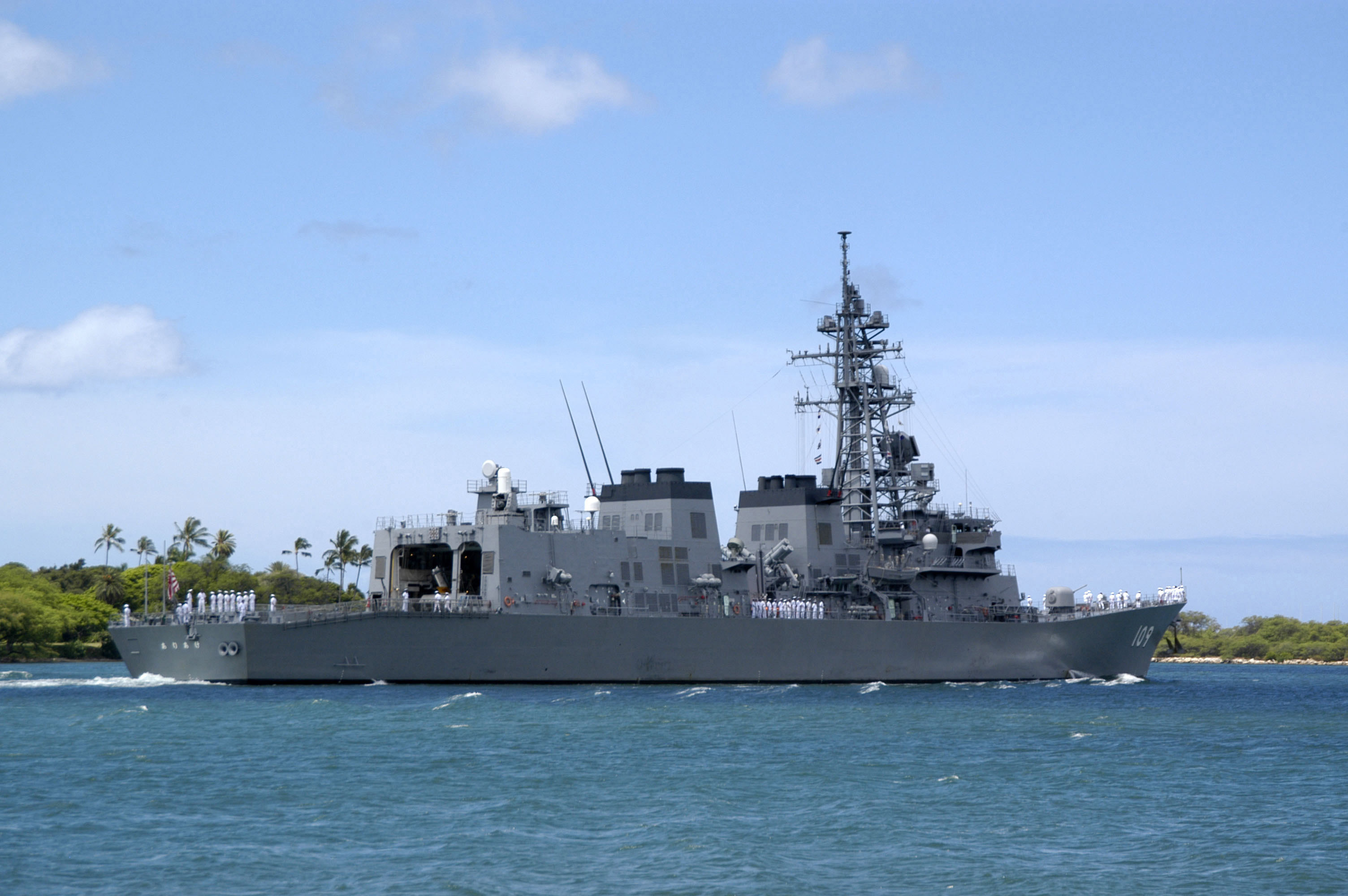
JS Ariake entering Pearl Harbor on 5 July 2006

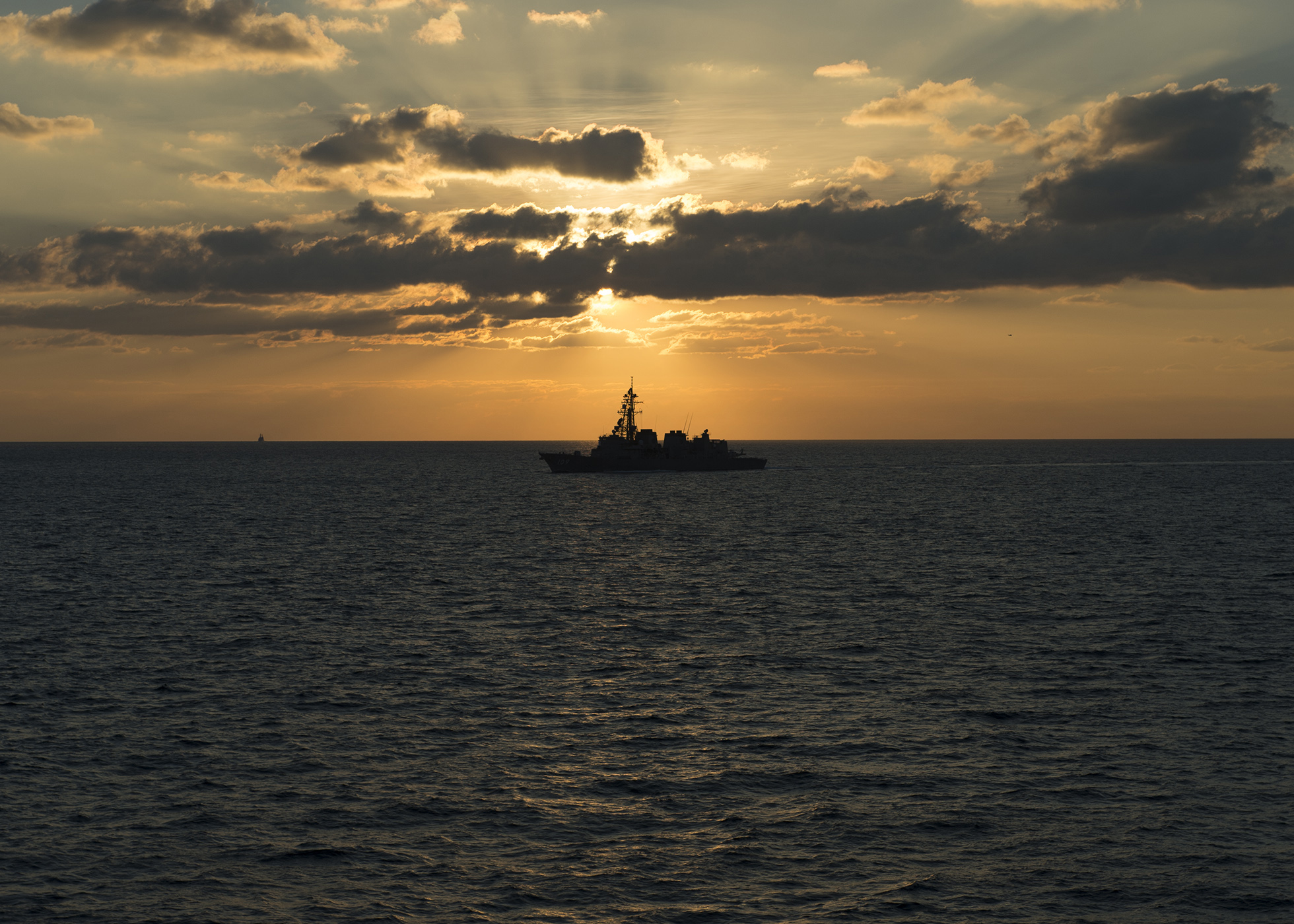
JS Ariake in the Gulf of Oman on 11 December 2013

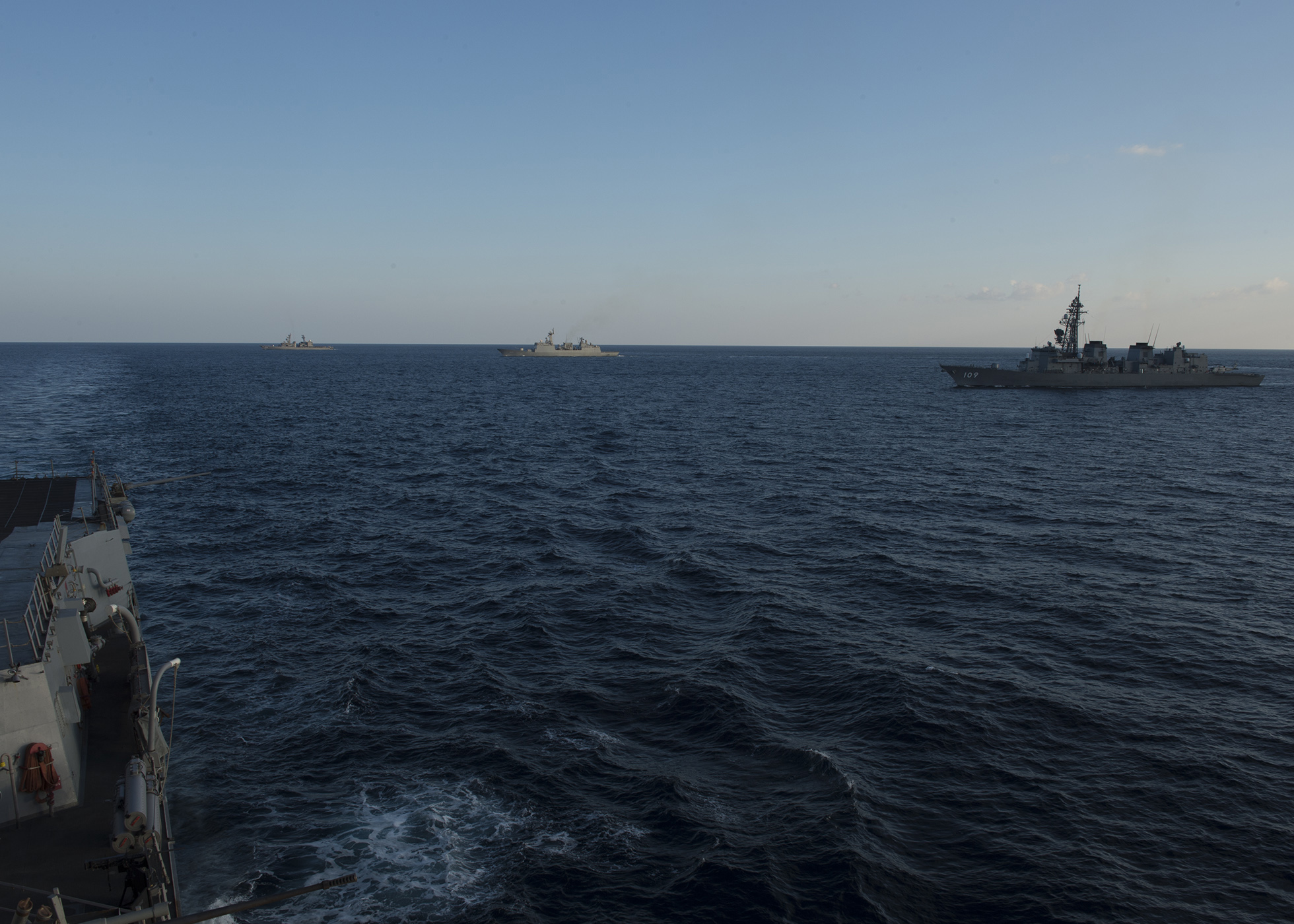
JS Ariake in the Gulf of Oman on 11 December 2013

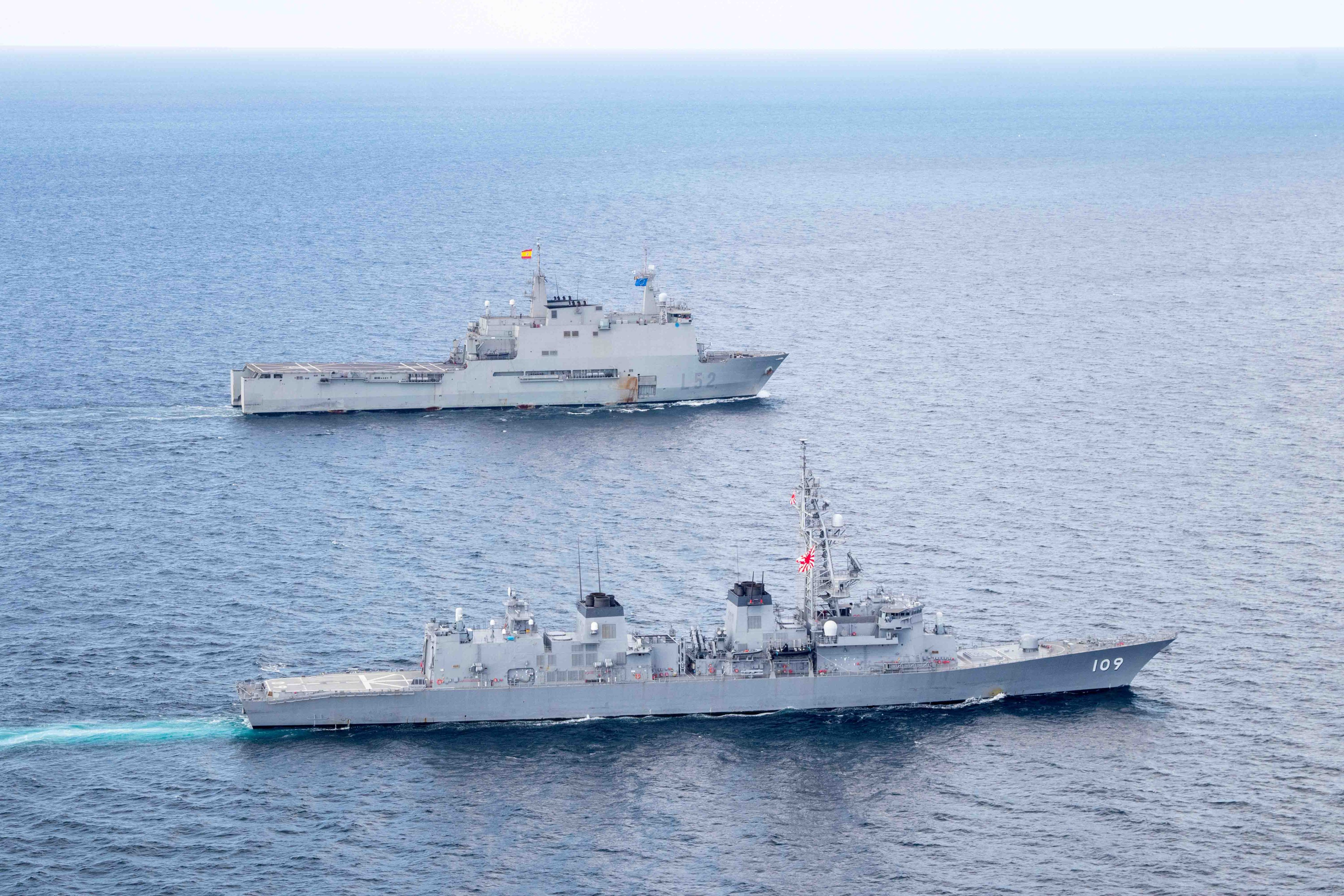
JS Ariake with the Spanish landing ship dock Castilla in 2021

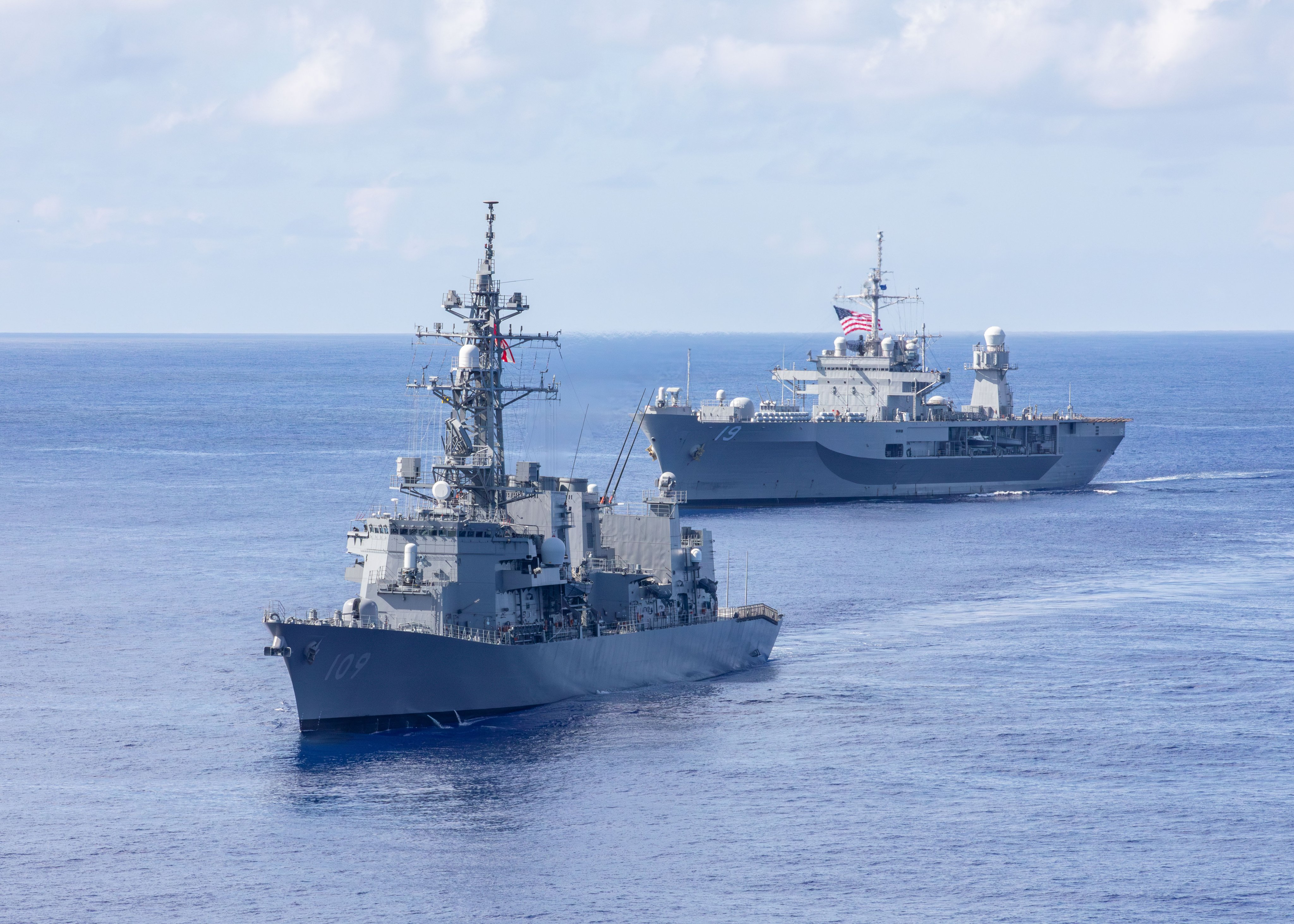
JS Ariake with USS Blue Ridge, 16 August 2024
