= MV Prestige =

Bahamian oil tank

Coordinates: 42°53′N 9°53′W

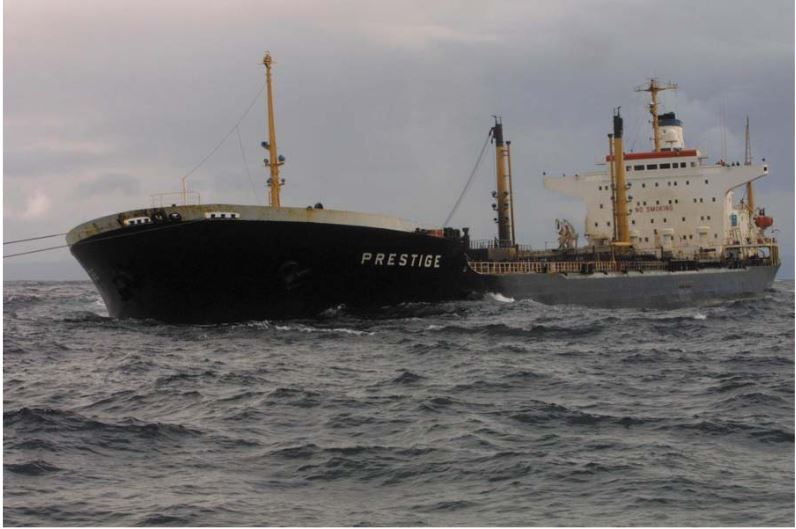
- MV Prestige under emergency tow shortly before it sank in November 2002

History
- Name: Prestige
- Owner: Mare Shipping Inc.(1994–2002); Lancer Corporation (1988–1994); Monarch Tankers (1976–1988)
- Port of registry: Nassau, Bahamas (1994–2002); Greece (1989–1994); Liberia (1988); Panama (1976–1988)
- Route: Riga – Gibraltar – Singapore
- Builder: Hitachi Shipbuilding and Engineering Co.
- Launched: 10 December 1975
- Completed: 1976
- Renamed: Gladys (1976–1988); Prestige (1988–2002)
- Identification: IMO number: 7372141; ABS number: 7603948; MMSI number: 308957000; Maritime call sign: C6MN6
- Fate: Foundered 19 November 2002.

General characteristics
- Type: Aframax Single-Hull
- Tonnage: 81,589 DWT 42,820 GT
- Length: 243 m (797 ft 3 in)
- Beam: 34.4 m (112 ft 10 in)
- Draft: 14 m (45 ft 11 in)
- Depth: 18.7 m (61 ft 4 in)
- Installed power: 1 × 900 kW alternator; 2 × 480 kW alternators
- Propulsion: Burmeister & Wain Type 8K84EF, 8-cylinder diesel, 14,711 kW (19,728 hp)
- Speed: 15.4 knots (28.5 km/h; 17.7 mph)
- Crew: 27
- Notes: Use of Maltese Cross by ABS

MV Prestige was an oil tanker owned by a Greek company based in Athens and operating under a Bahamian flag of convenience, that on 19 November 2002 sank off the coast of Galicia, Spain. The sinking caused a major environmental disaster, polluting thousands of miles of coastline with 50,000 metric tons (49,000 long tons; 55,000 short tons) of oil.

== Design and construction ==
Prestige was a single-hulled oil tanker with a length overall of 243 metres (797 ft 3 in), a beam of 34.4 metres (112 ft 10 in), a hull depth of 18.7 metres (61 ft 4 in), and a draft of 14 metres (45 ft 11 in). It had a 42,820 gross tonnage (GT) and a total cargo capacity of 81,589 tons deadweight (DWT).

The ship was launched on 10 December 1975 and completed on 30 March 1976 by Hitachi Shipbuilding and Engineering Co. in Maizuru, Kyoto, Japan. At the time of its sinking, it was owned by Mare Shipping, and registered in the Bahamas.

== See also ==
- List of oil spills
- Plataforma Nunca Máis
- Aegean Sea, another oil tanker that sank off the Galician coast in 1992
