= Chaland de débarquement d'infanterie et de chars =

Two tank landing ships of the French Navy

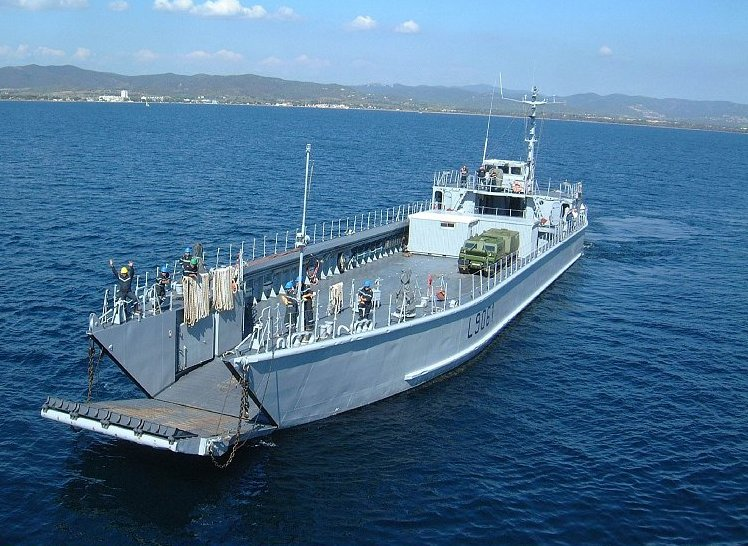
- The CDIC Rapière landing near Toulon on 24 September 2003

Class overview
- Name: Chaland de débarquement d'infanterie et de chars (CDIC)
- Builders: SFCN, Villeneuve-la-Garenne, France
- Operators: French Navy; Chilean Navy
- Preceded by: EDIC
- In service: 1988–present
- Completed: 2
- Active: 1
- Laid up: 1

General characteristics
- Type: Landing ship tank
- Displacement: 390 t (380 long tons); 760 t (750 long tons) full load
- Length: 59.4 m (194 ft 11 in)
- Beam: 11.9 m (39 ft 1 in)
- Draught: 1.8 m (5 ft 11 in)
- Propulsion: 2 SACM Uni Diesel UD 30 V12 M1 diesel engines; 890 kW (1,200 hp); 2 propellers
- Speed: 10.5 knots (19 km/h; 12 mph)
- Range: 1,000 nmi (1,900 km; 1,200 mi) at 10 knots (19 km/h; 12 mph)
- Capacity: 350 t (340 long tons)
- Troops: 230
- Complement: 18
- Armament: 2 × 20 mm modèle F2 guns; 2 × 12.7 mm (0.5 in) machine guns

The Chalands de débarquement d'infanterie et de chars (CDIC) were two tank landing ships that operated in the French Navy. They were designed to operate from landing platform dock ships such as the Foudre class, or for coastal support. The two ships of the class, Rapière and Hallebarde, entered service in 1988 and 1989 respectively and were initially named CDIC 9061 and CDIC 9062 before receiving their new names in 1997. In 2011 Rapière was among a package of four ships sold to the Chilean Navy and renamed Canave.

== Design and description ==
The CDIC landing craft were improved versions of the Engin de débarquement d'infanterie et de chars (EDIC) vessels that had been constructed from the 1950s to the 1980s. They were designed to work with the Foudre-class landing platform dock ships of the French Navy and take infantry and vehicles from the landing platforms to the shore. The landing craft can also be used for coastal transport., The CDIC vessels have a standard displacement of 390 tonnes (380 long tons) and 760 tonnes (750 long tons) at full load. They are 59.4 metres (194 ft 11 in) long with a beam of 11.9 metres (39 ft 1 in) and a maximum draught of 1.8 metres (5 ft 11 in). The two landing craft are powered by two SACM Uni Diesel UD 30 V12 M1 diesel engines driving two shafts rated at 890 kilowatts (1,200 hp). The CDIC have a maximum speed of 10.5 knots (19 km/h; 12 mph) and a range of 1,000 nmi (1,900 km; 1,200 mi) at 10 knots (19 km/h; 12 mph). The two ships have capacity for 350 t (340 long tons) of stores and room for 230 personnel. They have a complement of 18 including one officer. They mount two 20 mm modèle F2 guns and two 12.7 mm (0.5 in) machine guns. The wheelhouse can be lowered so that the vessels can dock more easily.

== Ships in class ==
CDIC construction data
Pennant no.	Name	Builder	Commissioned	Status
L 9061	Rapière	SFCN, Villeneuve-la-Garenne, France	28 July 1988	Sold to Chile in 2011, renamed Canave
L 9062	Hallebarde	SFCN, Villeneuve-la-Garenne, France	2 March 1989	Laid up in reserve 2014

== Construction and career ==
Two CDIC ships were ordered for construction by SFCN at Villeneuve-la-Garenne, France, the same site as the last two EDIC vessels had been constructed. There had been more planned orders but delays with the Foudre class prevented any of them being placed. Initially named CDIC 9061 and CDIC 9062, the two landing craft were commissioned on 28 July 1988 and 2 March 1989. They were given their new names of Rapière and Halleberde on 21 July 1997. On 23 December 2011 Rapière was sold along with Foudre and the chaland de transport de matériel CTM 19 and CTM 24 to the Chilean Navy. Rapière was renamed Canave in Chilean service. Beginning in 2013, Halleberde was used to supply the Île du Levant, an island in the Mediterranean Sea off Toulon. On 4 September 2014, Halleberde was taken out of service and placed in a state of ready reserve with the Amphibious Flotilla.
