= French ship Foudre =

Foudre may refer to one of the following ships of the French Navy:

- Foudre- a gunboat
- A gunboat (1795–1795)
- Foudre – a 6-gun brig launched in 1796, captured by the Royal Navy in March 1799, recaptured by the French Navy in one month later, recaptured by the Royal Navy in 1800, and sold in 1801.
- A gunboat (1804)
- A steam and sail frigate (1856–1872)
- Foudre, originally built as a torpedo boat tender, but converted to the world's first seaplane carrier (1895–1921)
- Foudre (A646), a Casa Grande-class dock landing ship later assigned the NATO side number L9020 (1953–1969)
- Foudre (L9011), the lead ship of the Foudre-class landing platform dock. Sold to Chile in 2011 and serving as Sargento Aldea (LSDH-91)
