= French ship Bougainville (L9077) =

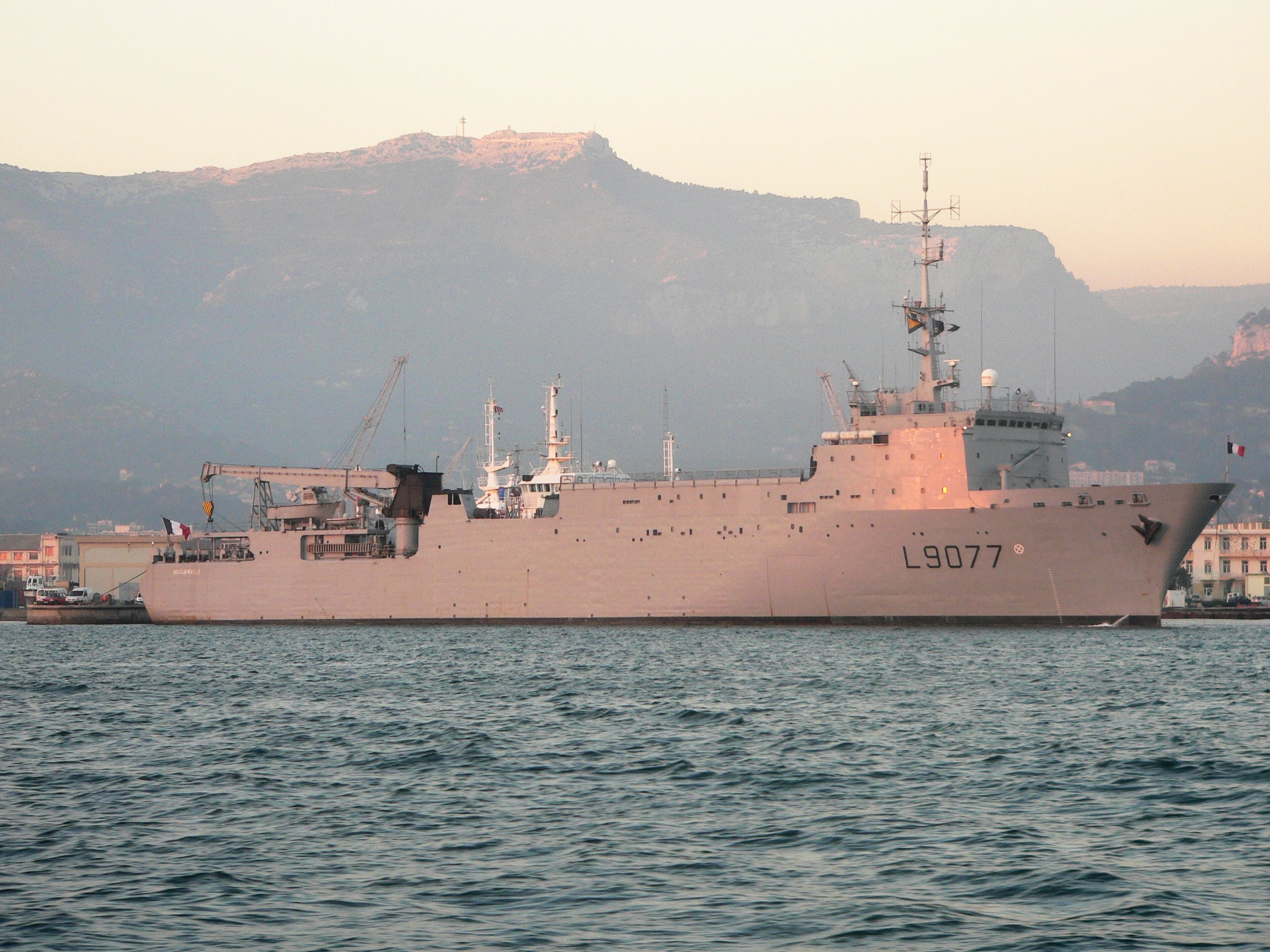
- Bougainville at Toulon in 2006

Class overview
- Builders: Chantiers Dubigeon; Chantiers de l'Atlantique
- Operators: French Navy
- Preceded by: Ouragan class
- Succeeded by: Foudre class
- Planned: 1
- Completed: 1
- Retired: 1

History

France
- Name: Bougainville
- Namesake: Louis Antoine de Bougainville
- Ordered: 22 November 1984
- Laid down: 28 January 1986
- Launched: 3 October 1986
- Commissioned: 25 June 1988
- Decommissioned: 2008
- Reclassified: 1998
- Fate: Sold on 17 May 2018 for scrapping in Ghent, Belgium

General characteristics
- Type: Landing platform dock
- Displacement: 4,200 t (4,100 long tons) standard; 4,870 t (4,790 long tons) full load
- Length: 113.5 m (372 ft 5 in) oa; 105.0 m (344 ft 6 in) pp
- Beam: 17.0 m (55 ft 9 in)
- Draught: 4.2 m (13 ft 9 in)
- Installed power: 2 × diesel engines; 4,800 bhp (3,600 kW)
- Propulsion: 2 × propellers; Bow thruster
- Speed: 15 knots (28 km/h; 17 mph)
- Range: 6,000 nmi (11,000 km; 6,900 mi) at 12 knots (22 km/h; 14 mph)
- Complement: 52 (+30 technicians)
- Sensors & processing systems: 2 × Decca 1226 naval navigation radar
- Armament: 78 m × 11.5 m (255 ft 11 in × 37 ft 9 in) well deck
- Aviation facilities: Landing pad for two helicopters

Bougainville was a French landing platform dock and an intelligence vessel ordered on behalf of French nuclear experimentation centers. The ship was constructed by Chantiers Dubigeon shipyard at Nantes and completed by Chantiers de l'Atlantique at Saint Nazaire. Bougainville was launched on 28 January 1986 and commissioned on 25 June 1988. During the bulk of its career, it was used for transportation for French nuclear tests in Polynesia or humanitarian aid. In the latter half its career, the vessel was converted for signals intelligence and was replaced by Dupuy de Lôme in 2006. Bougainville was decommissioned in 2008 and used as part of the breakwater for the aircraft carrier Charles de Gaulle. The ship was sold for scrap in 2018.

== Background and description ==
The ship was ordered on 22 November 1984 for use by the Directorate of Nuclear Experimentation (French: Direction des Centres d'Expérimentations Nucléaires) between Papeete and the French nuclear testing location at Muraroa Test Centre. Designated the Bâtiment de Transport Moyen et de Soutien, Bougainville was a scaled down version of the Foudre-class landing platform docks under construction for the French Navy. The ship measured 113.5 metres (372 ft 5 in) long overall and 105.0 m (344 ft 6 in) between perpendiculars with a beam of 17.0 m (55 ft 9 in) and a draught of 4.2 m (13 ft 9 in). The ship had a standard displacement of 4,200 tonnes (4,100 long tons) and a full load displacement 4,870 t (4,790 long tons). After the ship was converted to an intelligence ship, the vessel's draught increased to 4.3 m (14 ft 1 in), the standard displacement to 4,876 t (4,799 long tons), and the full load displacement to 5,195 t (5,113 long tons).

The ship was initially powered by UNI UD 33-V12-M5 diesel engines turning two shafts with controllable pitch propellers, creating 4,800 brake horsepower (3,600 kW). These engines were later swapped out for SACM AG0 195 V12 RVR diesels. The vessel had a 400 hp (300 kW) bow thruster for increased maneuverability during anchoring and amphibious landing operations. (Note: Gardiner, Chumbley, and Budzbon state the ship had twin bow thrusters.) Bougainville had a maximum speed of 15 knots (28 km/h; 17 mph) and a range of 6,000 nautical miles (11,000 km; 6,900 mi) at 12 knots (22 km/h; 14 mph). The ship could stay at sea for 45 days.

The landing platform dock had a well deck measuring 78 by 10.2 m (255 ft 11 in by 33 ft 6 in), serviced by a 10 by 6 m (33 by 20 ft) stern door. The well deck could accommodate three landing craft of the chaland de transport de matériel (CTM) type or forty intermodal containers. The ship's draft increased to 9.2 m (30 ft 2 in) when the well deck was flooded, providing 3.15 m (10 ft 4 in) clear over the deck. The well deck was serviced by a fixed 37-ton crane located aft to starboard and a travelling 25-ton crane. Three removable 6 m (20 ft) sections could be slotted above the well deck to increase cargo capacity. The ship was equipped with repair shops and he well deck was capable of receiving ships as large as 400 tons for maintenance. The ship also had a 6 m starboard ramp capable of accommodating 53 t (52 long tons; 58 short tons) and could be used to load vehicles. The ship was equipped with medical facilities.

Bougainville had a 26 by 17 m (85 by 56 ft) flight deck located amidships. The ship could operate two helicopters (first the Super Puma and then later, the Super Frelon) but had no hangar. The vessel had facilities to repair helicopters. The ship was not initially armed, but later mounted two 12.7 mm (0.50 in) machine guns and was fitted for but not with two Simbad launchers for Mistral surface-to-air missiles. After the conversion to an intelligence ship, the vessel was fitted with communications intercept sensors and Syracuse II SATCOM. The ship had a complement of 53 personnel including 5 officers and 10 civilian staff. The ship could transport 500 troops for eight days.

== History ==
Bougainville's keel was laid down on 28 January 1986 by Chantiers Dubigeon at Nantes. Shortly after construction began it was put on hold. Construction resumed and the ship was launched on 3 October of the same year. However, due to financial difficulties, Chantiers Dubigeon closed and the incomplete hull was towed to Chantiers de l'Atlantique at Saint-Nazaire to be completed. The vessel was commissioned on 25 June 1988. Bougainville was based in Polynesia, where it performed missions of Tahiti-Hao-Mururoa-Fangataufa (inter-island maritime transport), supporting French nuclear testing. Aside from support for French naval operations, Bougainville also provided humanitarian support in the area following natural disasters.

Once the Directorate of Nuclear Experimentation was closed in 1997, Bougainville returned to France from Papeete in November 1998. On 30 November 1998, Bougainville began conversion to an intelligence ship. Bougainville returned to service in November 1999 based at Toulon, replacing the aging Barry. In October 2001, it was tasked with collecting information in the Indian Ocean as part of the War in Afghanistan in the aftermath of the 11 September attacks. Bougainville supported coalition forces during the conflict. It was replaced by Dupuy de Lôme in the intelligence ship role and was converted back into a transport ship in 2006. Just after conversion, the vessel took part in supporting efforts to combat the Chikungunya virus and then took part in Mission Corymbe-91 the next year. It was decommissioned in 2008 after 20 years of service and placed in reserve on 29 May 2009. Five years later, in 2013, the ship was used as a breakwater for a drydock containing the aircraft carrier Charles de Gaulle. It was sold for scrap in 2018 to the Galloo shipyard at Ghent, Belgium, and left Toulon on 17 May 2018 for dismantling.
