= Ouragan =

Ouragan may refer to:

- Possibly an old name for Columbia River
- French destroyer Ouragan, which also served in the Polish Navy during World War II
- The Ouragan-class landing platform dock of the French Navy and the lead ship of the class
- Dassault Ouragan French jet fighter aircraft
- French for European windstorm
- "Ouragan (song)", a 1986 single by Princess Stéphanie of Monaco
- An abbreviation of "Offre urbaine renouvelée et améliorée gérée par un automatisme nouveau", a communications-based train control system in use on Paris Metro Line 13
- Ouragan, l'odyssée d'un vent, 2016 French documentary
