= Electronic warfare support measures =

Electronic intelligence gathering method

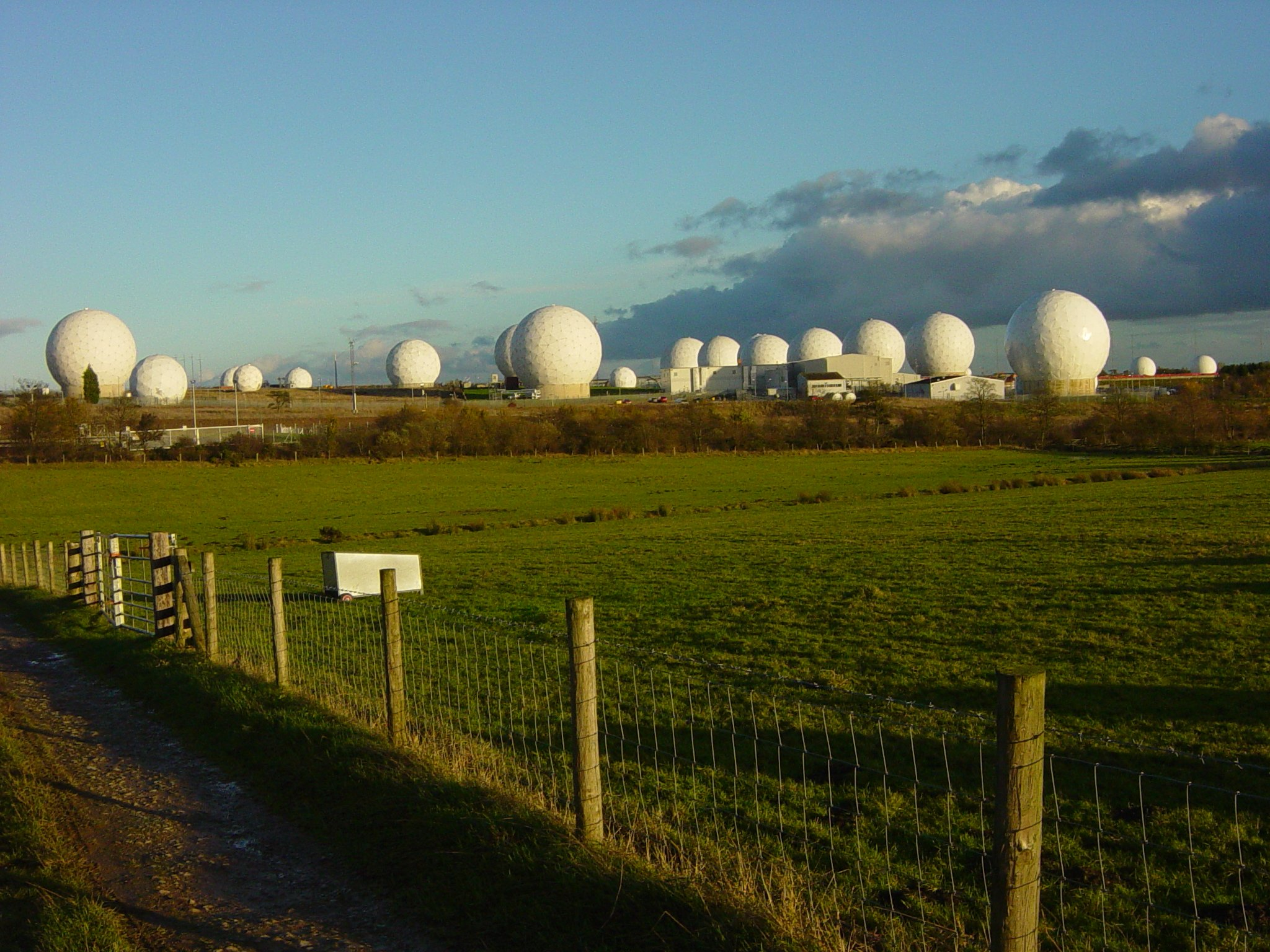
RAF Menwith Hill, a large ECHELON site in the United Kingdom, and part of the UK-USA Security Agreement.

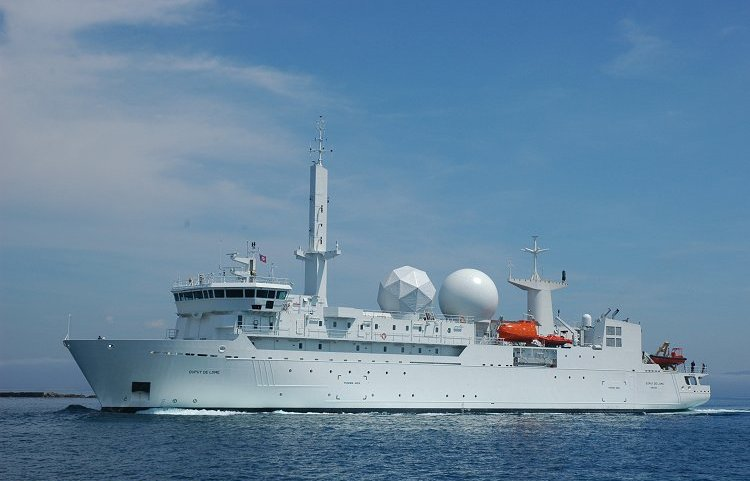
French ship Dupuy de Lôme, specialised in SIGINT

In military telecommunications, electronic support (ES) or electronic support measures (ESM) gather intelligence through passive "listening" to electromagnetic radiations of military interest. They are an aspect of electronic warfare involving actions taken under direct control of an operational commander to detect, intercept, identify, locate, record, and/or analyze sources of radiated electromagnetic energy for the purposes of immediate threat recognition (such as warning that fire control radar has locked on a combat vehicle, ship, or aircraft) or longer-term operational planning. Thus, electronic support provides a source of information required for decisions involving electronic protection (EP), electronic attack (EA), avoidance, targeting, and other tactical employment of forces. Electronic support data can be used to produce signals intelligence (SIGINT), communications intelligence (COMINT) and electronics intelligence (ELINT).

Electronic support measures can provide (1) initial detection or knowledge of foreign systems, (2) a library of technical and operational data on foreign systems, and (3) tactical combat information utilizing that library. ESM collection platforms can remain electronically silent and detect and analyze RADAR transmissions beyond the RADAR detection range because of the greater power of the transmitted electromagnetic pulse with respect to a reflected echo of that pulse. United States airborne ESM receivers are designated in the AN/ALR series.

Desirable characteristics for electromagnetic surveillance and collection equipment include (1) wide-spectrum or bandwidth capability because foreign frequencies are initially unknown, (2) wide dynamic range because the signal strength is initially unknown, (3) narrow bandpass to discriminate the signal of interest from other electromagnetic radiation on nearby frequencies, and (4) good angle-of arrival measurement for bearings to locate the transmitter. The frequency spectrum of interest ranges from 30 MHz to 50 GHz. Multiple receivers are typically required for surveillance of the entire spectrum, but tactical receivers may be functional within a specific signal strength threshold of a smaller frequency range.

== See also ==
- AWACS
- Boeing E-3 Sentry
- Boeing E-4
- Electronic warfare
  - Electronic countermeasure
- Lockheed Orion
- Low-probability-of-intercept radar
