= Foudre-class landing platform dock =

Class of French landing platform docks

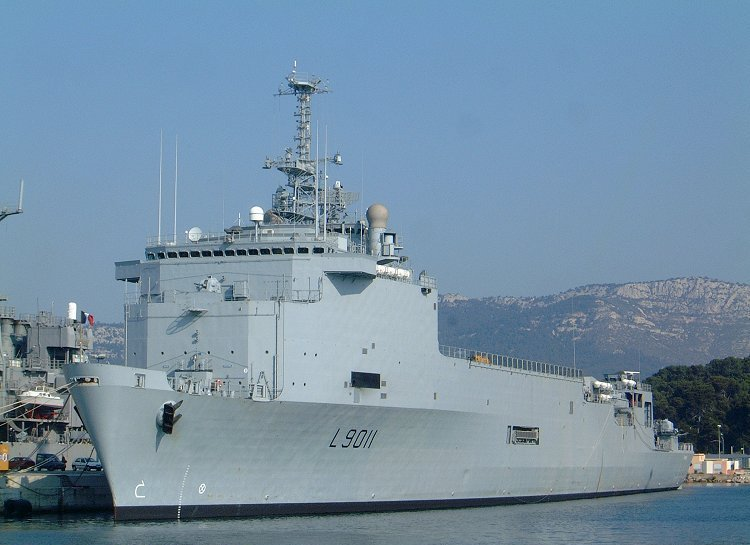
- Foudre

Class overview
- Name: Foudre class
- Operators: French Navy; Chilean Navy; Brazilian Navy
- Preceded by: Bougainville class
- Succeeded by: Mistral class
- Built: 1986–1998
- In commission: 1990-present
- Completed: 2
- Active: 2

General characteristics for Foudre
- Type: Landing platform dock
- Displacement: 9,300 t (9,200 long tons) (standard); 11,880 t (11,690 long tons) (full load)
- Length: 168.0 m (551 ft 2 in) oa
- Beam: 23.5 m (77 ft 1 in)
- Draught: 5.6 m (18 ft 4 in)
- Installed power: 15,480 kW (20,760 bhp)
- Propulsion: 2 × SEMT-Pielstick 16 PC 2.5 V400 diesel engines; 2 × controllable-pitch propellers; 1 × bow thruster (750 kW; 1,000 hp); 5 × 850 kW diesel alternators
- Speed: 21 knots (39 km/h; 24 mph)
- Range: 11,000 nmi (20,000 km; 13,000 mi) at 15 knots (28 km/h; 17 mph)
- Endurance: 30 days
- Boats & landing craft carried: 10 CTMs
- Troops: 470
- Complement: 215
- Sensors & processing systems: 1 × DRBV-21A air/surface search radar; 1 × Decca 2459 surface search radar
- Electronic warfare & decoys: 1 × ARBB-36 jammer; 1 × SLQ-25 Nixie decoy system
- Armament: 3 Simbad launcher systems for Mistral SAMs; 3 × single 30 mm (1.2 in) Breda-Mauser guns; 4 × single 12.7 mm (0.50 in) machine guns
- Aircraft carried: 4 × Super Puma EC225 or 2 × Aérospatiale SA 321 Super Frelon
- Aviation facilities: 1,450 m^{2} (15,600 sq ft) flight deck

The Foudre-class landing platform dock is a class of landing platform docks designed and constructed for the French Navy. Designated Transport de Chalands de Débarquement, they were intended to replace the ageing Ouragan class and the construction of four vessels was planned. Only two were built and the remaining two were instead reordered as Mistral-class amphibious assault ships. The two ships of the Foudre class, Foudre and Siroco, operated with the French Navy between 1990 and 2014. Replaced by the Mistrals, in 2011 Foudre was sold to the Chilean Navy and Siroco was sold to the Brazilian Navy in 2015.

== Design and description ==
The Foudre class was designed to embark a mechanized regiment of the Rapid Action Force (French: Force d'action rapide) and act as its logistical support vessel once in theatre. Designated Transport de Chalands de Débarquement by the French Navy, they were ordered as replacements for the Ouragan class with improvements over the previous design. The improvements included a higher speed, a hangar for helicopters, an elevator allowing for the quicker transfer of cargo between decks of the ship and side ramp embarkation, allowing for the loading of troops and vehicles from dockside. Due to delays in the procurement of the ships, the two vessels were built to slightly different layouts, with the second ship of the class, Siroco incorporating a number of improvements later added to the first, Foudre. Foudre displaces 8,190 tonnes (8,060 long tons) light, 9,300 t (9,200 long tons) standard, 11,880 t (11,690 long tons) at full load and 17,200 t (16,900 long tons) when flooded. Siroco has a displacement of 8,230 t (8,100 long tons) light, 12,013 t (11,823 long tons) at full load and 17,205 t (16,933 long tons) when flooded. The vessels are 168 metres (551 ft 2 in) long overall, 160 m (524 ft 11 in) between perpendiculars with a beam of 23.5 m (77 ft 1 in) and 22 m (72 ft 2 in) at the waterline with a draught of 5.2 metres (17 ft 1 in) and 9.1 m (29 ft 10 in) when flooded.

The vessels are both propelled by two controllable pitch propellers powered by two SEMT-Pielstick 16 PC 2.5 V400 diesel engines creating 15,480 kW (20,760 bhp). The vessels also have a 700 kW (940 shp) bow thruster used primarily during amphibious operations. The Foudre-class ships have a maximum speed of 21 knots (39 km/h; 24 mph) and a range of 11,000 nautical miles (20,000 km; 13,000 mi) at 15 knots (28 km/h; 17 mph). They are equipped with five 450 kW diesel generator sets creating a total of 4,250 kW of electricity. The ships have an endurance of 30 days at sea. The citadel is nuclear, biological and chemical protected.

=== Amphibious capability ===
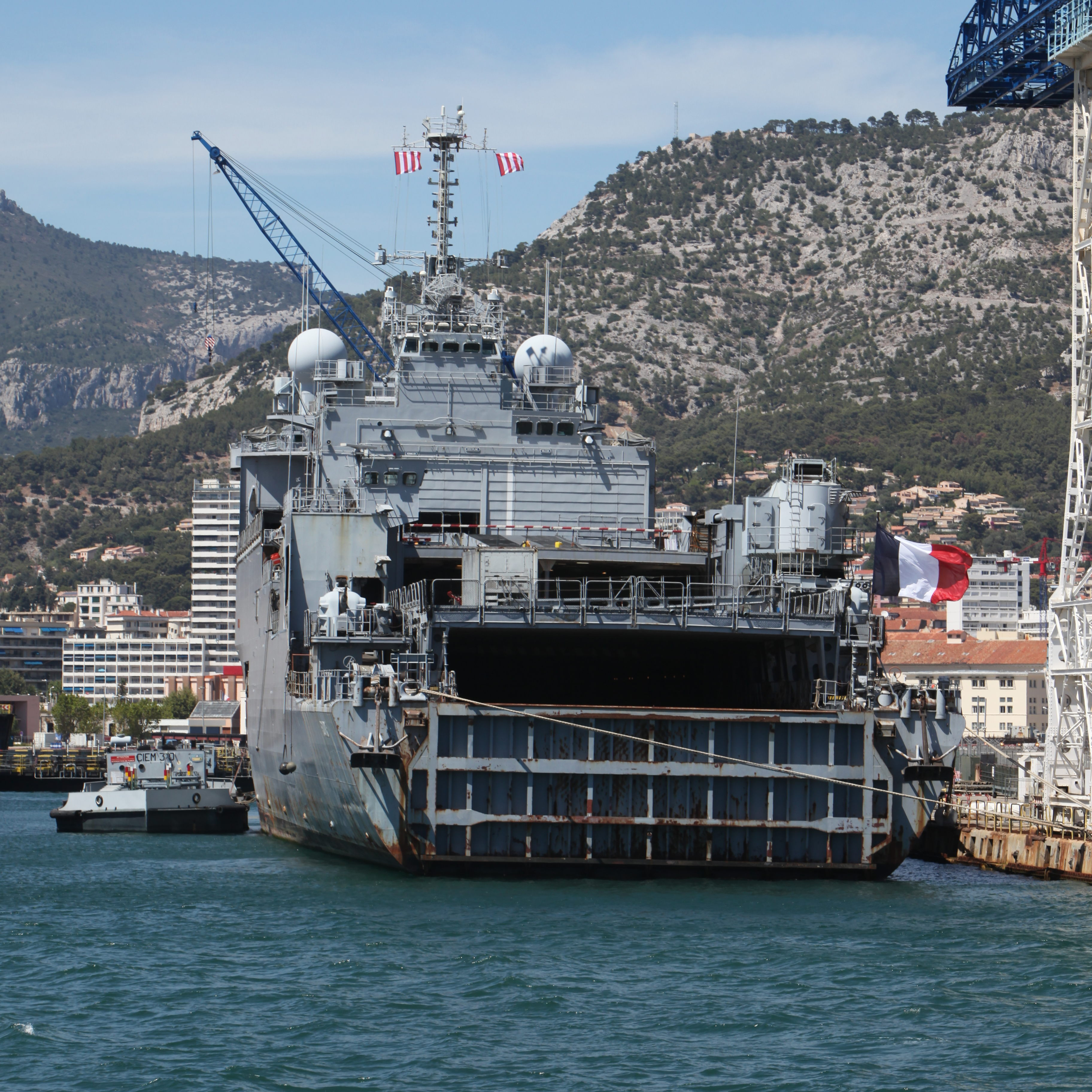
A rear view of the well deck

The Foudre class carry large stowage areas which can be used to ferry battle tanks and vehicles. Each ship has a 122 by 13.5 m (400 by 44 ft) docking well capable of stowing ten chaland de transport de matériel (CTMs) or one chaland de débarquement d'infanterie et de chars (CDIC)/engin de débarquement d'infanterie et de chars (EDIC) with four CTMs or two CDICs. They can also store two landing craft vehicle personnel suspended from davits abeam the aft part of the docking well. The landing craft can be put to sea by filling ballast tanks lowering the ship, and opening the rear door, flooding the well deck with 3 m (9.8 ft) of water. The ships can ballast down in 30 minutes with 7,000 m^{2} (75,000 sq ft) of ballast capacity. It takes a further 45 minutes to de-ballast. To aid in the quicker loading of the ship dockside, the vessels were given side-door loading capability. The well deck is capable of docking a ship up to 400 t (390 long tons).

The ships have permanent accommodation for 470 troops but can support up to 2,000 for three days. They have capacity for 1,080 t (1,060 long tons; 1,190 short tons) of vehicles and cargo stowed in a 1,360 m^{2} (14,600 sq ft) area. This can be extended by using the forward third of the well deck that is kept dry using a cofferdam. The well and cargo decks are serviced by a 13.5 by 8 m (44 by 26 ft) elevator with a lift capacity of 56 t (55 long tons; 62 short tons) and a crane with a 37 t (36 long tons; 41 short tons) lift capacity in Foudre and 38 t (37 long tons; 42 short tons) capable crane in Siroco. The ships can also store up to 150 t (150 long tons; 170 short tons) of cargo fuel. They also sport a 600 m^{2} (6,500 sq ft) hospital area located beneath flight deck in order to ease transfer of casualties. The hospital facilities include two surgical operating suites and 47 beds. The ships also have repair and maintenance facilities.

=== Aircraft ===
The Foudre-class ships are equipped with a hangar capable of accommodating four Eurocopter Super Puma or two Aérospatiale Super Frelon helicopters. They each have a flight deck amidships capable of operating two Super Puma helicopters simultaneously. Foudre's flight deck, measuring 1,450 m^{2} (15,600 sq ft) has two landing spots but only one fitted with SAMAHE haul-down systems. Siroco's flight deck measures 1,740 m^{2} (18,700 sq ft) after it was extended aft. Both ships can add an additional 30 by 15 m (98 by 49 ft) landing spot on portable helicopter and vehicle stowage platform aft. Five 6 m (20 ft), 25 t (25 long tons) floatable sections can be added or lifted off by the 37/38-ton cranes. The vessels carry 184,000 L (40,000 imp gal; 49,000 US gal) of JP-5 aviation fuel.

=== Armament and sensors ===
Foudre was initially armed with two two-round Sadral launchers for Mistral surface-to-air missiles, one located to either side of the bridge and one 40-millimetre (1.6 in) gun and two single-mounted 20 mm (0.79 in) guns. The Mistral missile has an infrared homing to 2.2 nmi (4.1 km; 2.5 mi) with a 3-kilogram (6.6 lb) warhead. The Sadral launchers were replaced with Simbad launchers and the number was later increased to three in Foudre with the third mount fitted atop the bridge. In 1998, the 40 mm and 20 mm guns were removed and replaced with 30 mm (1.2 in) Breda-Mauser guns. The 30 mm guns can fire a 0.36 kg (0.79 lb) shell 1.6 nmi (3.0 km; 1.8 mi) and up to 800 rounds/minute. Siroco was equipped with the 30 mm guns during construction and received a third Simbad launcher in 2002. Both ships are equipped with four 12.7 mm (0.50 in) machine guns.

Both ships received SENIT 8.01 with Link 11 reception and OPSMER command support systems. Two SAGEM VIGY-105 optronic fire control systems were installed for the 30 mm guns. They are equipped with Thomson-CSF DRBV 21A Mars air and surface search radar operating on the D band and a Racal Decca 2459 surface search radar operating on I band. For electronic warfare, the vessels mount Thales ARBB-36 jammer and SLQ-25 Nixie towed torpedo decoy systems. One of the DRBN 34A navigation radars is situated aft to aid in helicopter flight operations.

== Ships ==
Foudre class construction data
Number	Name	Builder	Laid down	Launched	Commissioned	Fate
L9011	Foudre	DCN Brest	26 March 1986	19 November 1988	7 December 1990	sold 2011 to Chile, renamed Sargento Aldea
L9012	Siroco	DCN Brest	2 October 1994	14 December 1996	21 December 1998	sold 2015 to Brazil, renamed Bahia

== Construction and career ==
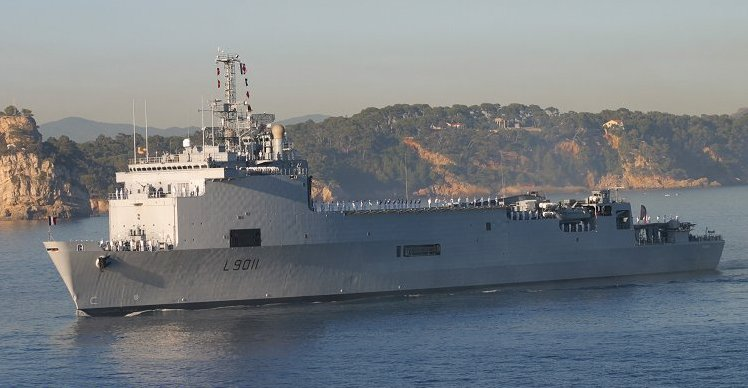
Foudre

Three vessels were ordered as part of the 1984–1988 naval programme. Foudre was ordered 5 November 1984. However, budget issues delayed the construction of the following two hulls and they were deferred to later budgets. Eventually, Siroco was ordered on 11 April 1994 with the remaining two hulls from the previous order re-ordered as Mistral-class amphibious assault ships. Both ships were constructed by DCN Brest, with Foudre entering service in 1990 and Siroco in 1998. Both ships were assigned to the Naval Action Force (French: Force d'action navale) and based at Toulon. In 1999, Siroco was deployed to East Timor as part of the International Force for East Timor.

In June 2010, French defence minister Hervé Morin offered Foudre to the Argentine Navy during his visit to Buenos Aires. Argentina had already declined the transfer of the Ouragan-class vessels in the past and was more interested in seeking French support for a locally built amphibious ship instead. In 2010, Siroco was ordered to Haiti to support operations aiding the country after an earthquake devastated the country.

Foudre was taken out of service by the French Navy in 2011. In October 2011 it was announced that Chile and France had finalized negotiations for sale of Foudre to Chile for around US$80 million. The official purchase date was 21 November 2011 and the ship was transferred on 23 December. Foudre entered service in the Chilean Navy as Sargento Aldea. The 2013 French White Paper on Defence and National Security said that Siroco would be decommissioned, a decision confirmed in October 2014. After negotiations with Portugal failed, Siroco was sold to Brazil in July 2015 and entered service with the Brazilian Navy as Bahia.

== See also ==
Equivalent amphibious warfare ships of the same era

- Rotterdam class
- Albion class
- Galicia class
- Harpers Ferry class
- Ōsumi class
