= Ouragan-class landing platform dock =

Landing platform dock ship built for French Navy

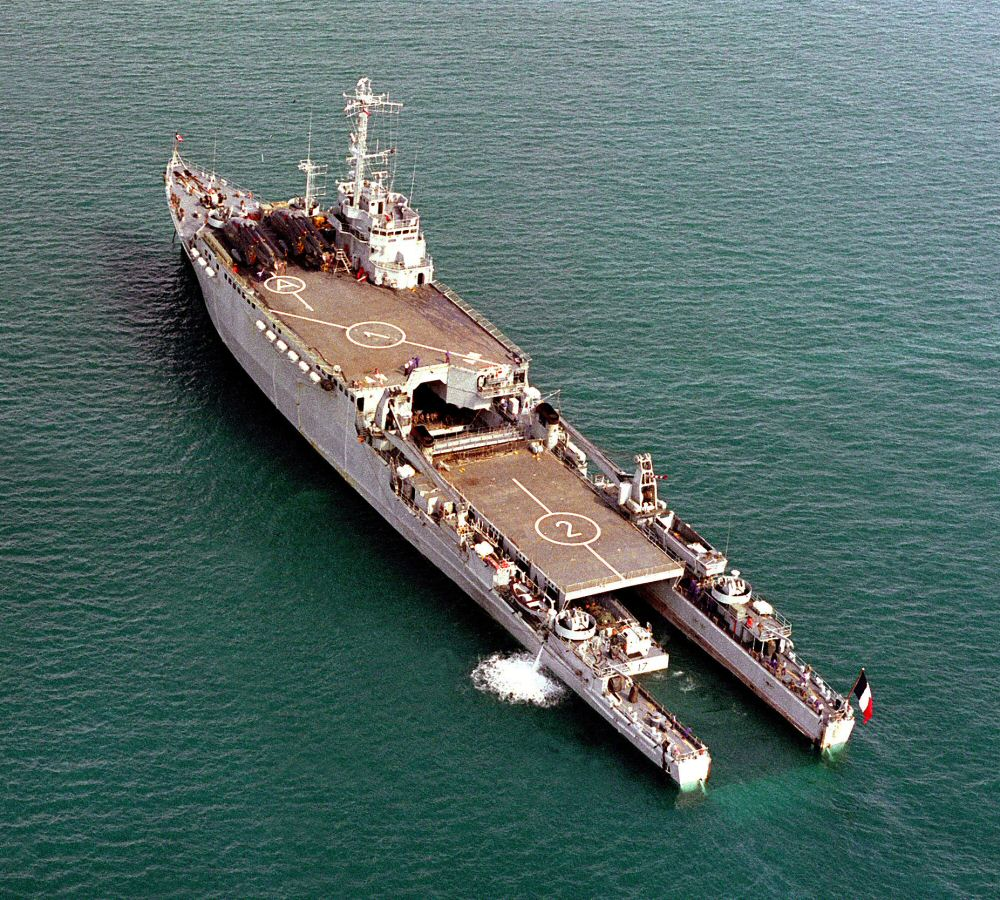
- Ouragan at sea during exercise Dragon Hammer 90

Class overview
- Name: Ouragan class
- Builders: Brest Arsenal (DCN)
- Operators: French Navy
- Succeeded by: Bougainville class
- Built: 1962–1968
- In commission: 1965–2007
- Completed: 2
- Scrapped: 2

General characteristics as built
- Type: Landing platform dock
- Displacement: 5,800 t (5,700 long tons) standard; 8,500 t (8,400 long tons) full load
- Length: 149.0 m (488 ft 10 in) oa; 144.5 m (474 ft 1 in) pp
- Beam: 21.5 m (70 ft 6 in)
- Draught: 5.4 m (17 ft 9 in)
- Propulsion: 2 SEMT-Pielstick 12 PC 2V diesel engines, Ouragan total 6,400 kW (8,600 hp); Orage total 7,000 kW (9,400 hp); 2,650 kW electrical power; 2 controllable pitch propellers
- Speed: 17 knots (31 km/h; 20 mph)
- Range: 9,000 nmi (17,000 km; 10,000 mi) at 15 knots (28 km/h; 17 mph)
- Complement: 211
- Sensors & processing systems: Ouragan only; SQS-17 sonar
- Armament: Ouragan only; 2 × 105 mm (4.1 in) mortars; 4 × Bofors 40 mm (1.6 in) guns
- Aircraft carried: 3 × Aérospatiale SA 321 Super Frelon or 10 Aérospatiale Alouette III helicopters
- Aviation facilities: 900 m^{2} (9,700 sq ft) flight deck

The Ouragan class (French: Hurricane) was a series of French landing platform docks operated by the Marine Nationale. They were designated Transport de chalands de débarquement (TCD) (in English: landing craft transport) in French service. The Ouragan class was the first series of landing platform docks designed and constructed by France. The two ships entered service in the late 1960s and both ships saw service in the Pacific Ocean as part of the French nuclear programme. They were initially intended to be replaced by the Foudre-class landing platform docks in the 1990s. However, due to delays, they were kept in service until they were replaced by the Mistral-class amphibious assault ships in the 2000s. A possible sale to Argentina fell through after concerns of asbestos arose. Both ships were taken out of service in 2007 and were scrapped in Belgium in 2016 and 2017 respectively.

== Background ==
In the immediate post-World War II era, the French Navy acquired a series of American and British amphibious warfare ships. This was done in order to gain knowledge and experience with these ship types. The French acquired the Casa Grande-class dock landing ship Foudre in 1952 via the Mutual Defense Assistance Program. Foudre served until 1969 and was the basis for French knowledge of the ship type.

== Design and description ==
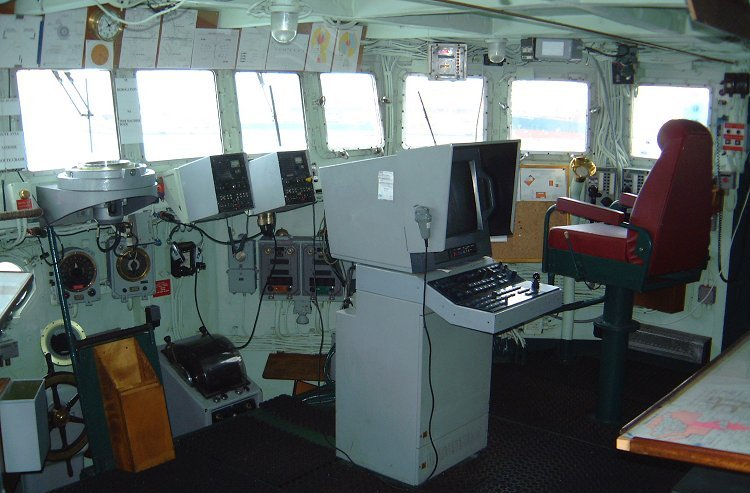
The command bridge of Ouragan

The class was designed for multi-mission capability. They had the ability to complete a fast loading and unloading of landing craft, and other equipment, carrying troops and vehicles for a land mission. The vessels could carry, supply and operate helicopters transporting commandos or providing close support. They could transport the mission crew and command a landing operation of limited scale. The Ouragan class had a standard displacement of 5,800 tonnes (5,700 long tons) and 8,500 t (8,400 long tons) at full load. They were 149 metres (488 ft 10 in) long overall and 144.5 m (474 ft 1 in) between perpendiculars with a beam of 21.5 m (70 ft 6 in) and a draught of 5.4 metres (17 ft 9 in). When completely docked down they had a displacement of 15,000 t (15,000 long tons) and a draught of 8.7 m (28 ft 7 in). The vessels had a max complement of 213 personnel including 10 officers. (Note: The number of crew fluctuates over time with a crew of 205 including 12 officers in 2004.)

Ouragan was powered by two SEMT-Pielstick 12 PC 2V diesel engines turning two shafts and controllable pitch propellers. Ouragan's powerplant created 6,400 kilowatts (8,600 hp) and Orage's, 7,000 kW (9,400 hp). This gave the ships a maximum speed of 17 knots (31 km/h; 20 mph) and a range of 9,000 nautical miles (17,000 km; 10,000 mi) at 15 knots (28 km/h; 17 mph). The ships both created 2,650 kW of electrical power.

=== Amphibious warfare ===
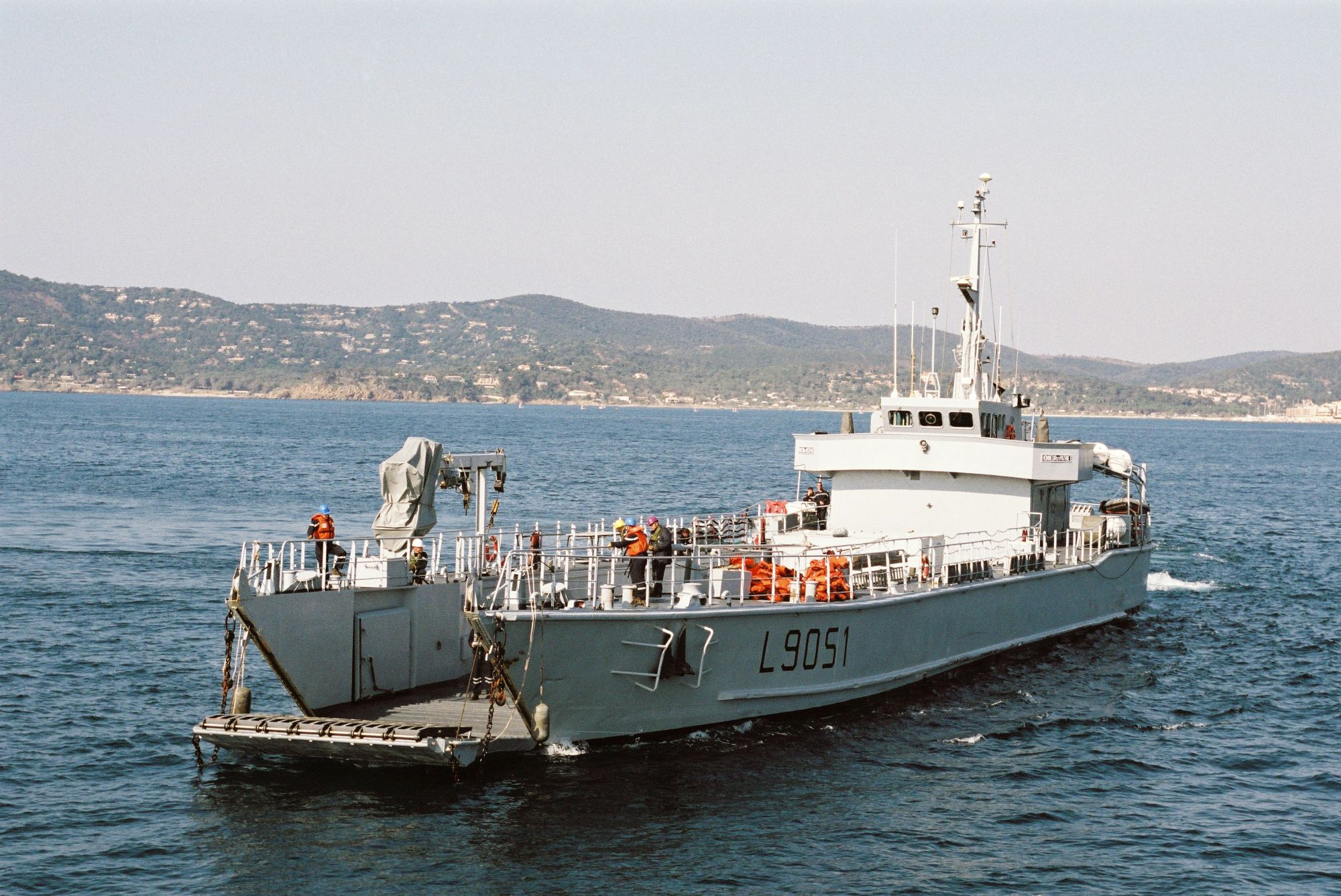
Type EDIC landing craft

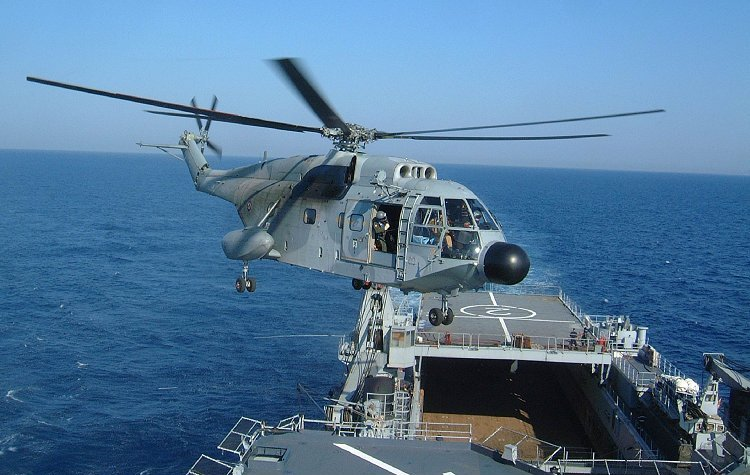
Super Frelon overflying Ouragan

The ship had a 120 by 13.2 m (394 by 43 ft) well deck that could be submerged 3 m (9.8 ft) under water. The movement of water within the ship was control by sluices, valves and automatic pumps. The vessels were capable of filling the deck at 3,000 m^{3}/h (110,000 cu ft/h) controlled from a central position. The well deck was accessed by a 14 by 5.5 m (46 by 18 ft) stern gate. Since the vessels were designed for multi-mission capability, the Ouragan class had several layouts. The standard layout allowed the vessels to transport 349 troops with 14 officers. For short distances the number could rise to 470 troops. The ships were supplied with two Engin de débarquement d'infanterie et de chars (EDICs) which could transport eleven light tanks or eight loaded Chaland de transport de matériel (CTMs) or with eighteen Mk 6 landing craft mechanized (LCMs) operating from the well deck. A further three landing craft vehicle personnel (LCVPs) could be carried topside.

Mission flexibility was accomplished through the non-permanent sections of both the internal and external decks that could be removed. A 90 m (300 ft) temporary dock could be created from fifteen temporary sections that allowed for an increase in storage space for equipment, however the docking well was reduced to half its normal size. Logistically they could carry 1,500 t (1,500 long tons; 1,700 short tons) of equipment which was serviced by the two 35-ton cranes mounted above the docking well. Orage's interior layout was altered, equipped with an enclosed flag bridge but with the removable decks and surgical compartments removed Furthermore, there was a large provision of decontamination areas. They were also designed as repair ships, able to dock ships up to 450 t (440 long tons; 500 short tons) within their well and had repair and maintenance facilities along with electrical and ordnance workshops.

=== Armament and electronic warfare ===
Ouragan was originally armed with two single-mounted 120-millimetre (4.7 in) mortars and four single-mounted 40 mm (1.6 in) guns. The 120 mm mortars had a range of 10.8 nmi (20.0 km; 12.4 mi) and fired a 24 kilograms (53 lb) shell. The 40 mm guns had a range of 6.5 nmi (12.0 km; 7.5 mi). Orage was unarmed. However, in 1993, the two ships were upgraded with two Matra Simbad twin missile launchers armed with the Mistral infrared surface-to-air missile. The anti sea-skimmer missile has a homing range to 2.2 nmi (4.1 km; 2.5 mi) and carried a 3 kg (6.6 lb) warhead. Orage was also given two single-mounted Breda/Mauser 30 mm (1.2 in)/70 guns.

Ouragan was initially deployed with the SQS-17 sonar system. In 1993, as part of their modernisation, both ships were equipped with Thomson-CSF DRBV 51A air/surface radar operating on the G band and for weapons control they were given two SAGEM VIGY-105 optronic systems. Ouragan's sonar was removed in the refit.

=== Aircraft ===
Ships of the Ouragan class had a 900-square-metre (9,700 sq ft) flight deck that initially had the ability to operate three Aérospatiale SA 321 Super Frelon helicopters or ten Aérospatiale Alouette IIIs. To accommodate the flight deck, a small island was situated to the starboard side. They could have one further Super Frelon or three Alouettes fly from a removable six-section 36 m (118 ft) flight deck area covering their well deck space. Within its hold, it could carry 18 Super Frelons and 80 Alouettes for transport purposes only.

== Ships in class ==
Ouragan class construction data
Pennant no.	Name	Builder	Laid down	Launched	Commissioned	Fate
L9021	Ouragan	DCN Brest	June 1962	9 November 1963	1 June 1965	Retired 2007, scrapped at Ghent, Belgium in 2016
L9022	Orage	DCN Brest	June 1966	22 April 1967	1 March 1968	Retired 2007, scrapped at Ghent, Belgium in 2017

== Service history ==
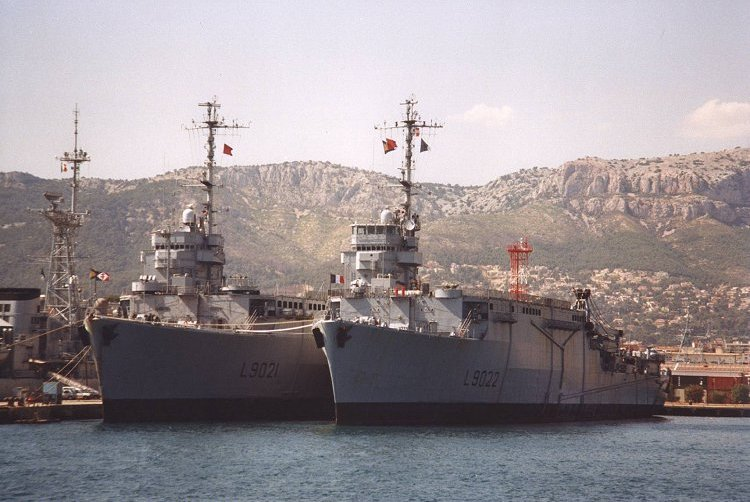
The landing dock ships Ouragan and Orage docked in Toulon

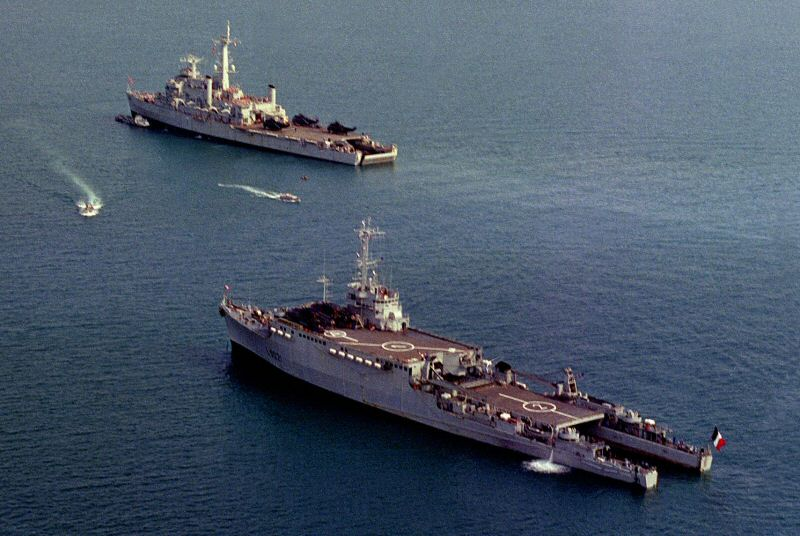
Ouragan and HMS Intrepid

Ouragan was assigned to the Pacific Experimental Centre, the French nuclear testing centre while based at Brest. Ouragan took part in nuclear tests and was present for the first French hydrogen bomb test in 1968. In 1975, the ship was ordered to Anjouan to evacuate French citizens from the Cormoros. Following its commissioning, Orage was sent to the Pacific Ocean and assigned to the Pacific Experimental Centre. While deployed with this unit, Orage was unarmed and its surgical compartments and inboard removable decks were replaced with modular structure. This allowed the vessel to be a floating headquarters ship. The vessel acted as the primary transport for the unit to and from France. During its career, Orage carried out eleven Pacific cruises before joining the Atlantic fleet in 1977.

In 1979, Ouragan was sent to Lebanon to embark the French army contingent of UNIFIL. In 1987, Ouragan rescued the small freighter Taporo 1 after the merchant suffered damage to its propulsion and was left adrift on a coral reef. In 1991, Ouragan and Orage took part in the Opération Daguet, the French armed forces operation in the Gulf War. That year, Orage supported the French ballistic missile submarine Redoutable when it sailed to Dakar, marking the first acknowledged visit of nuclear submarine to Africa.

The ships were due to decommission in 1993, however delays in the construction of the Foudre class forced the French Navy to send the class in for an overhaul. Following the refit, both ships were assigned to the Force d'action navale based in Toulon. Their service life was again extended until the Mistral-class amphibious assault ships entered service. In the 1990s, Orage deployed to the Mediterranean Sea in support of missions during the Yugoslav Wars and the War in Kosovo. In 2004, the ship was ordered to Haiti to protect French citizens during unrest in the country. The two ships of this class were supposedly due for transfer to the Argentine Navy in 2006 and 2007 but the whole operation was placed on hold by the Argentine Government due to concerns about asbestos, a toxic material used in the ships' construction. They remained moored in Toulon harbour. Both ships were taken out of service in 2007 and sold for scrap on 16 July 2009. In early 2016 Ouragan arrived at Ghent at the Galloo ship recycling plant where it was dismantled. In mid 2017, Orage was sent for dismantling in Belgium.

== See also ==
Equivalent landing ships of the same era

- Anchorage class
- Fearless class
