= Gustav Pielstick =

Gustav Pielstick (25 January 1890 – 11 March 1961) was a German ship engine designer who developed a series of particularly powerful diesel engines.

== Life ==
Pielstick was born on 25 January 1890 in Sillenstede, Germany. After attending the upper secondary school in Wilhelmshaven, he began an internship at the Wilhelmshaven Imperial Shipyard. Afterwards he attended the higher ship and mechanical engineering school in Kiel. In October 1911, Pielstick joined MAN as a design engineer in Augsburg, where he worked on the development of submarine engines. During World War I, he was promoted to Chief Engineer and, after the war, he was involved in the development of the first MAN four-stroke crosshead engines for commercial shipping. At the end of the 1920s, the Reich Navy demanded a line of high-performance diesel engines with a power to weight ratio of six kilograms per horsepower. This had not previously been achieved anywhere in the world. Up to 1931, MAN and Pielstick developed engines to meet the specification. The first was tested in the German training ship Bremse and later versions were used in the construction of the German cruiser Admiral Scheer and the German cruiser Admiral Graf Spee.

In 1934 Pielstick was appointed director of the diesel engine department of MAN. Under his leadership diesel engines emerged for ships, locomotives and stationary work. Pielstick paid particular attention to the development of engines with ever higher power density, based on the turbocharged submarine engine. The head of the design office of the naval high command, Heinrich Waas, stated: "Never before has the German Navy relied on a company and its chief designer, as it did then on M.A.N. and Pielstick".

After World War II Pielstick had to leave his post with the MAN at the behest of the victorious powers: Russia, USA, Great Britain, France & China. From 1946, he worked with some former employees in La Courneuve, France and founded the design office for diesel engines Société d’Etudes des Machines Thermiques (SEMT). Pielstick's work as director of the office was so successful that its designs were licensed in numerous countries, including Germany, and the company was named SEMT Pielstick. In the late 1950s, Pielstick retired from professional life and spent his old age in Lugano, Switzerland. Gustav Pielstick died in Zürich on 11 March 1961.
