= Libreville Hospital =

Geography
- Location: Libreville, Gabon
- Coordinates: 0.3880°N 9.4597°E

Services
- Beds: 650

Links
- Lists: Hospitals in Gabon

Libreville Hospital (French: Centre Hospitalier de Libreville, CHL) is the largest and most important hospital in Gabon. Located in the nation's capital of Libreville, the hospital has an accident and emergency department which serves much of the country.

The hospital treated soldiers during the 2009 Gabonese helicopter crash.

The first Department of Neurology in Gabon was opened in Libreville Hospital on 15 September 1980. The hospital also has a Department of Visceral Surgery.

Libreville Hospital has 650 beds and a workforce of agents estimated at 1,500 agents across all categories. The hospital possesses sufficient technology to deal with various diseases. However, due to factors such as heavy patient burden and, consequently, fluidly defined staff roles, the hospital most often provides primary and secondary care rather than the specialised (tertiary) care that is in principle given to it. Additionally, because health facilities in Gabon generally do not support childbirths as of yet, except in the Okala district of Libreville, Libreville Hospital handles almost all deliveries in the city.
