= French ship Foudre (L9011) =

Amphibious assault ship of the French and Chilean Navies

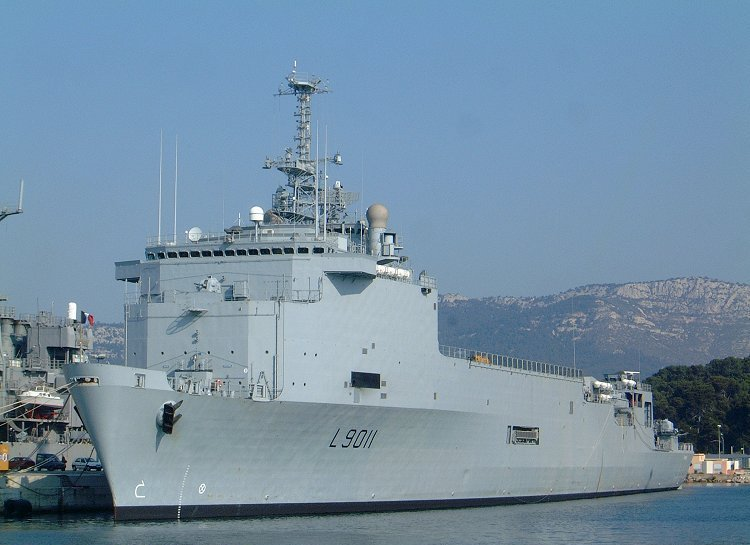
- Foudre at Toulon

History

France
- Name: Foudre
- Namesake: Lightning
- Builder: DCN, Brest
- Laid down: 26 March 1986
- Launched: 19 November 1988
- Commissioned: 7 December 1990
- Decommissioned: December 2011
- Home port: Toulon
- Identification: L 9011
- Fate: Transferred to the Chilean Navy in December 2011

Chile
- Name: Sargento Aldea
- Namesake: Sergeant Juan de Dios Aldea Fonseca
- Acquired: 23 December 2011
- Home port: Valparaiso
- Identification: LSDH-91
- Status: In active service

General characteristics
- Class & type: Foudre-class landing platform dock
- Displacement: 11,300 tonnes (standard); 12,000 tonnes (full load)
- Length: 168 m (551 ft)
- Beam: 23.5 m (77 ft)
- Draught: 5.2 m (17 ft)
- Installed power: 20,800 hp (15,500 kW)
- Propulsion: Engines: 2 SEMT Pielstick 16 PC 2.5 V400 diesels; Propellers: 2 adjustable-blade propellers and one beam propeller; Auxiliaries: 1 beam propeller (1,000 hp); Electrical plant:5 SACM-Unidiesel diesels alternators; Electrical power: 4,250 kW (5 × 850 kW)
- Speed: 21 knots (39 km/h; 24 mph)
- Range: 11,000 nautical miles; 12,600 miles (20,300 km) at 15 knots (28 km/h; 17 mph)
- Boats & landing craft carried: 8 landing craft
- Capacity: 150-man command headquarters
- Troops: 450 (900 for a short cruise)
- Crew: 20 officers; 80 petty officers; 60 Quarter-masters
- Armament: 3 Simbad systems; 3 30 mm Breda-Mauser guns; 4 12.7 mm M2-HB Browing machine guns
- Aircraft carried: 4 helicopters AS-532 Cougar (Chilean Navy)
- Aviation facilities: Hangar

Foudre was an amphibious assault ship of the Marine Nationale, the twelfth vessel to bear the name, and lead ship of the Foudre-class landing platform docks. In December 2011 the vessel was sold to the Chilean Navy and renamed Sargento Aldea.

== Service history ==
=== Marine Nationale ===
Foudre served during the war in Yugoslavia, and was the central element of Opération Licorne in Côte d'Ivoire.

On 17 January 2009, one of Foudre's helicopters crashed off the coast of Gabon, killing eight French military personnel.

=== Sale and Chilean Navy service ===
In October 2011 it was announced that Chile and France had finalized negotiations for sale of Foudre to Chile for around US$80 million. She was transferred to Chile on 23 December 2011 and renamed Sargento Aldea.

== See also ==
- Juan de Dios Aldea
