= 2009 Gabon Eurocopter AS 532 crash =

2009 helicopter accident

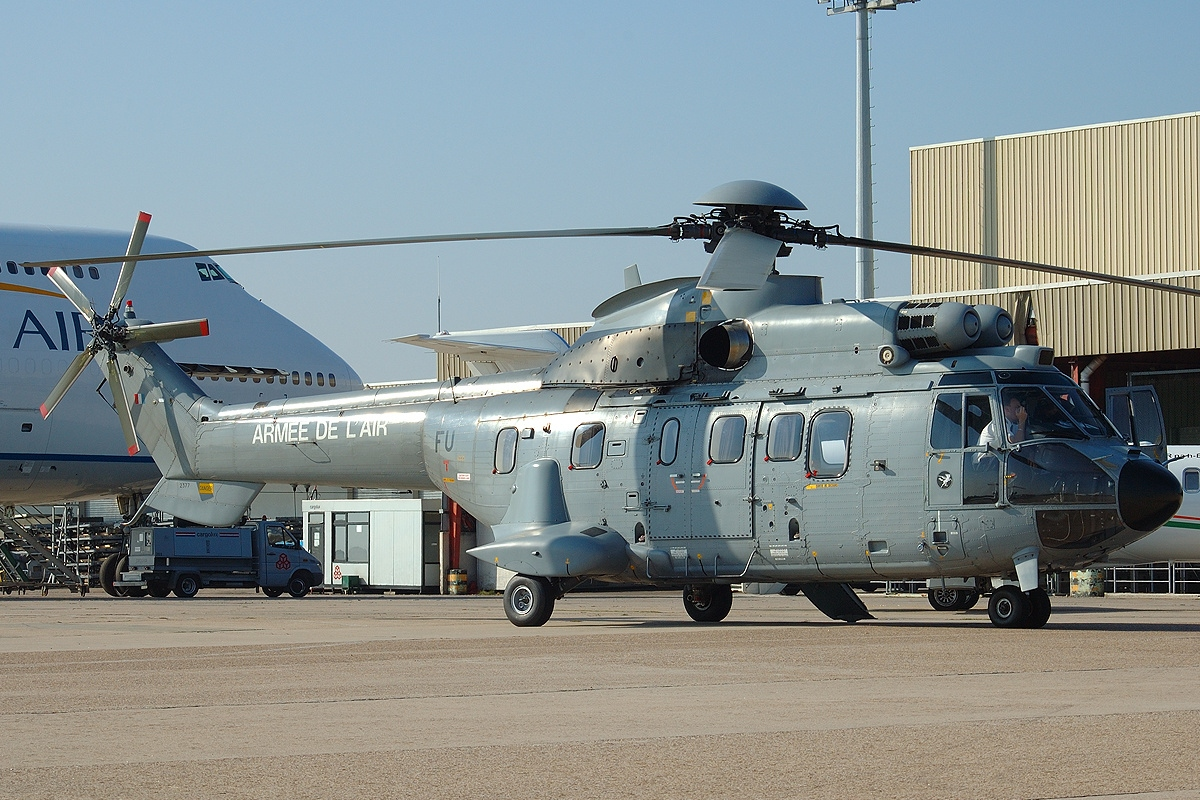
- A French Air Force Eurocopter AS-532 identical to the one involved in the incident.

Occurrence
- Date: January 17, 2009
- Summary: Under investigation
- Site: Atlantic Ocean off Gabon; 0°23′24″N 9°27′0″E
- Crash site is located south of the capital city Libreville, half way from Port-Gentil

Aircraft
- Aircraft type: Eurocopter AS 532
- Operator: French military
- Flight origin: French naval ship Foudre in the Atlantic Ocean
- Passengers: 6
- Crew: 4
- Fatalities: 8
- Injuries: 0
- Survivors: 2

The 2009 Gabon Eurocopter AS 532 occurred in the Atlantic Ocean off Gabon at 8:08 p.m. on January 17, 2009. Ten soldiers were in the Eurocopter AS 532 when it crashed, leaving eight military personnel dead. Three soldiers initially survived the French military helicopter crash which occurred shortly after take-off from the amphibious assault ship FS Foudre. One of the rescued soldiers died from injuries at Libreville Hospital. The helicopter came down off the coastal city of Nyonie between Port-Gentil and Libreville during a joint exercise with Gabonese troops. The cause of the crash is not known.

French President Nicolas Sarkozy immediately ordered his Minister of Defence, Hervé Morin, to fly to Gabon to oversee the rescue mission. Morin visited friends and relatives of the missing at Camp De Gaulle.

After the crash, FS Foudre was the first ship at the scene, and picked up some of the injured. Two helicopters, several ships, as well as underwater robots were sent by the French oil company Total S.A. to assist with rescue efforts. On January 18, the wreckage of the helicopter was discovered 35 metres (115 ft) underwater. Gabon Interior Minister Andre Mba Obame said, "Gabon is doing all that it can to help with the search."

== French presence in Gabon ==
France has maintained a military base in Gabon since its independence in 1960. The French military regularly conducts military exercises with the Gabonese army. French presence is known to have reduced tensions among various groups that operate in the three small islands of Gabon. These islands are rich in oil reserves found in surrounding off-shore waters. Islands are claimed by Gabon and Equatorial Guinea.
