= SEMT Pielstick =

Rolling stock manufacturer

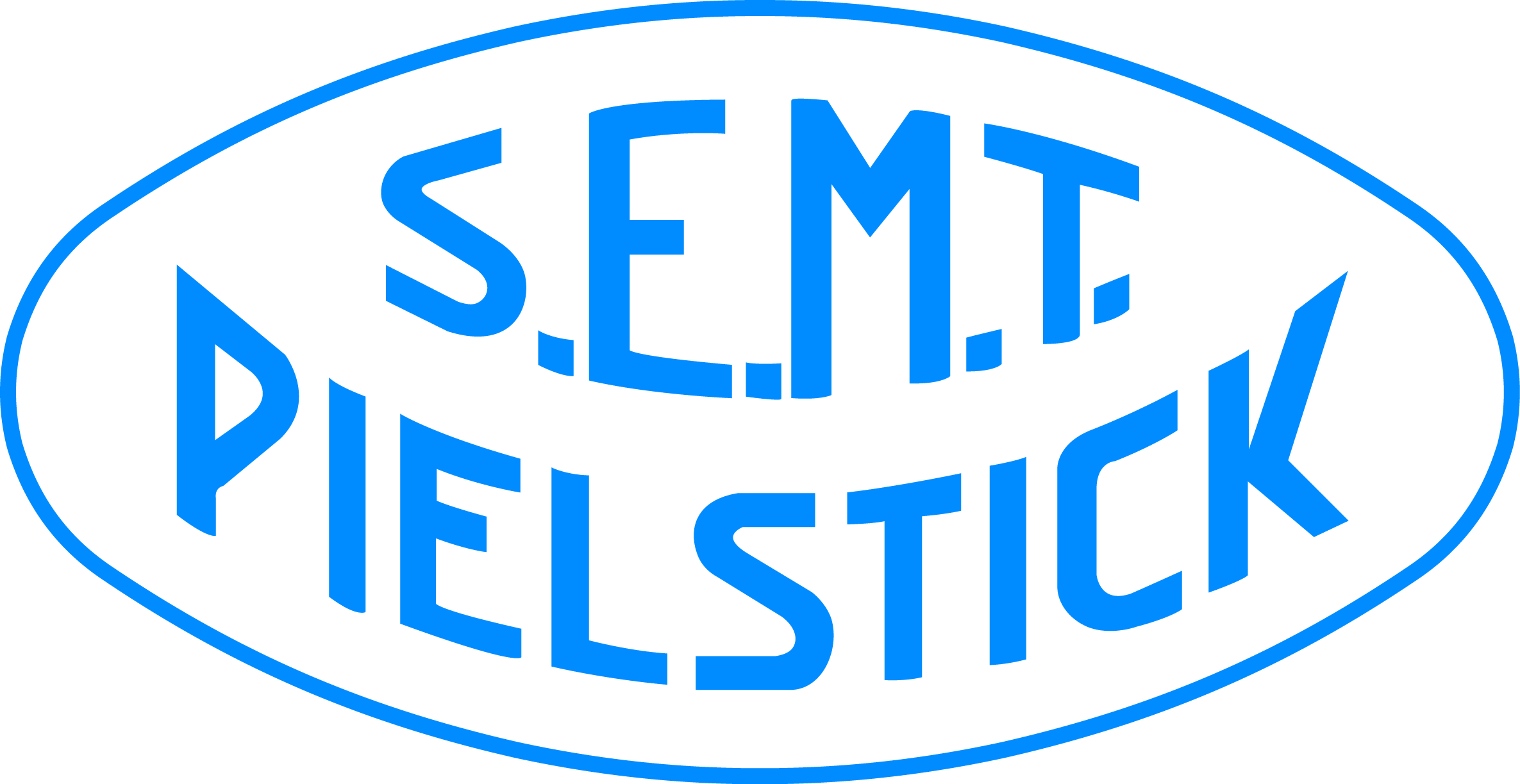
Logo

SEMT Pielstick was a French company that designed and built large diesel engines. Its full name was Société d’Etudes des Machines Thermiques (Company of Thermal Machines Studies).

Founded in 1948, SEMT was bought by MAN Diesel in 2006

During its existence as an independent company, SEMT manufactured engines for locomotives, naval vessels, power plants, and merchant ships. Its customers included France, the United States, Russia, India, and other countries.

== History ==
SEMT. was created in 1946 by France's ministry for industrial production by combining five national companies:

- Société des chantiers et ateliers de Penhoët (Saint-Nazaire),
- Société Générale de Construction Mécaniques (La Courneuve)
- Société des chantiers et ateliers Augustin Normand (Le Havre)
- Société des Ateliers et Chantiers de Bretagne (Nantes)
- Société des aciéries du Nord (Denain)

The aim of the new company was to develop new engines in France that could be licensed internationally. In 1948, the first licenses were supplied to licensed engine building companies worldwide.

In 1951, after its relocation at La Courneuve, the Société Générale de Constructions Mécaniques was equipped with the first test beds. The equipment, which enabled the company to speed up the development of a new range of engines, was later transferred to Saint-Denis and thesubsequently to Saint-Nazaire.

In 1976, Alsthom-Atlantique was the flagship of French industry. The conglomerate became the majority, which also owns the Saint-Nazaire mechanical facility and a factory at Jouet-sur-l’Aubois, was renamed S.E.M.T. Pielstick after the company's founder, Gustav Pielstick.

In 2006, MAN purchased the shares belonging to MTU to become the sole shareholder of SEMT. Then, in 2010, the diesel engine and turbo machinery activities were merged. The S.E.M.T. branding remains, and is protected, but no longer appears as a company name.

== Licensees ==
SEMT licensees that produce their engines:

Klöckner Humboldt Deutz - Köln; Germany

- Kawasaki Heavy Industries – Japan
- JFE – Japan
- Kirloskar Oil Engines - India
- Diesel United – Japan
- Niigata Power Systems – Japan
- Fairbanks Morse Engine – United States
- Doosan Heavy Industries & Construction – South Korea
- Shaanxi Diesel Heavy Industry – China
- Hudong Heavy Machinery – China
- TÜRASAŞ (TÜLOMSAŞ as its former name) - Turkey

== Engine lines ==
=== PC engine line ===
In 1951, SEMT developed the first PC1 engine. In 1953, the PC1 was modified to be powered by heavy fuel oil. The first unit to go into series production was a six-cylinder, in-line engine (6 PC1 L) for the electricity generating plant of Bamako, Mali. With a bore of 400 mm, the engine developed 180 kW per cylinder. Its first marine application for the PC1was in 1955, aboard the French Navy ship Borée (two engines).

Later in the 1960s, SEMT launched the PC2 engine line. Though it kept the same 400 mm bore, power output was increased to 310 kW per cylinder – an increase that became a regular feature of the engine's improvements in its subsequent versions: the PC2.3 in 1971, PC2.5 in 1973 and the 550 kW per cylinder PC2.6 in 1981. A dual-fuel version (gas and diesel) was also developed, while the range had its final addition in 1995 with the PC2.6B long-stroke engine. This final version featured a cast-iron engine mounting, a simpler design and a power output of 750 kW per cylinder – four times the power of the original model from 1953.

In 1969, the PC3 engine was launched. It had a 480 mm bore with a power output of 700 kW per cylinder.

In 1972, SEMT introduced the PC4 engine. It had a 570 mm bore and produced 990 kW per cylinder. With the PC4.2 version in 1981, it increased to 1,215 kW per cylinder. The PC4.2 B long-stroke model in 1985 raised the output to 1,325 kW per cylinder. In its 18-cylinder version, the latter model was one of the most powerful four-stroke engines on the market in its time.

=== PA engine line ===
The PA engines were high-speed units, running at more than 1,000 rpm. The initial PA1 and PA2 models could be seen as miniature versions of the PC engines, with a bore of 175 mm, and could be used for a wide range of applications – including powering submarines. The first turbo-charged version of the PA developed 46 kW per cylinder at 1,250 rpm.

Launched at the end of the 1950s and initially developing 110 kW per cylinder at 1,500 rpm, the PA4, with an initial 185 mm bore, was a completely new design. It would later be developed with a VG version (variable geometry combustion chamber) and subsequently with a 200 mm bore to increase the power. A dual-fuel version (diesel fuel and gas) would also be developed.

In 1978, the PA4 VGDS was launched. It had a twin-stage turbocharger to power naval ships, generating 184 kW per cylinder. The final model in the range was launched in 1988. This was the PA4 200 VGA for rail and naval applications, producing 165 kW per cylinder with a single-stage turbo. Specific versions for submarines were also developed: the PA4 185 SM, PA4 200 SM, and PA4 200 SMDS with twin turbo-charging.

=== PA6 engine line ===
In 1966, planning started for the PA6. It was designed to be the most powerful engine that could be fitted to a standard International Union of Railways (UIC) locomotive.

The UIC approved the PA6 in 1971 and the first engines were produced in 1972. In 1975, the high speed PA6 BTC for naval ships in 1975 was introduced. In 1981, the PA6 CL long-stroke engine with reduced fuel consumption was released. In 1988, the PA6 STC, which used sequential turbo-charging for naval ships, was introduced.

In 1995, SEMT launched the final engines in the series, the PA6 B and high-speed PA6 B STC in 1995, providing increases in power and overall performance. The PA5 was launched in 1981 to meet an initial market demand from the Japanese fishing fleet. A dual-fuel version would later be developed (diesel fuel and gas) for electricity generating stations.

== Major installations ==
=== French Navy surface ships ===
SEMT has provided PA and PC engines for many French naval vessels

- the Georges Leygues, La Fayette, Floréal, Cassard and Horizon frigates;
- the A69 avisos
- P400 patrol boats;
- the Jules Verne repair ship;
- the Durance class of oil tankers (one of which was built in Australia as HMAS Success)
- the Foudre and Ouragan Landing Platform Docks.

=== Other naval surface ships ===
SEMT provided engines to the Saudi F 3000 S frigates (Sawari II program) and the Sigma class frigates for the Moroccan Navy (2 x 20 PA6B STC).

Through Fairbanks Morse Engines, SEMT engines have been purchased by the US Navy, The 16-cylinder PC2.5 STC engine were used by the USN for the San Antonio-class LPD 17 troop transporters, which are each equipped with four engines

The PA and PC engines have been used by Australia, China, Canada, India, the United Kingdom, South Korea, Indonesia and Russia, along with the Japan Coast Guard.

=== Submarines ===
The PA4 engine was adapted for use by submarines, leading to the SM versions of the PA4 185 and 200. These were equipped with Hispano-Suiza compressors – given the particular constraints in terms of air aspiration and exhaust gases within a submarine. The compressor also minimized the pressure variations created by the sea swell, increasing the reliability of the engine and therefore the safety of the entire propulsion system.

=== Merchant ships ===
- Large ships (cruise liners, cargo ships and container ships) traditionally use medium-speed PC engines,
- Smaller vessels use high-speed PA engines

Japanese licensee Niigata identified strong demand among the country's fishing fleet – requiring an engine that would fit the trawlers exactly. The result was the design and development of the PA5, with a 255 mm bore.

The nine-cylinder PC20 engines developed for the Sovereign of the Seas (268 meters) were mounted on rubber pads to reduce noise and vibrations in the cabins.

=== Locomotives ===
The PA4 unit with a 185 mm bore was designed specifically for the locomotive market. Over 44,2% of all the engines produced in the history of SEMT were destined for locomotives.

=== Thermal power plants ===
Electricité de France (EDF) began using SEMT engines for its diesel-powered plants in the 1950s. EDF later equipped plants in France's overseas territories and dominions with 18 PC4.2 V engines.

The PC engines for diesel-fueled electricity generating plants were installed throughout Japan, having numerous islands that need to be autonomous in terms of power production.

=== Auxiliary power for nuclear plants ===
SEMT. Pielstick engines were used in many countries for backup power supplies to nuclear plants.

== Shareholder evolution ==
1987: The actions are shared in 3:

1. 49% by Alsthom
2. 25.5% by MTU
3. 25.5% by MAN

1990: Shares are shared equally by Alsthom, MAN and MTU (33.3% each).

2006: 100% of Pielstick's shares are held by MAN and became the sole shareholder.
