= French ship Dupuy de Lôme (A759) =

Intelligence ship of the French Navy

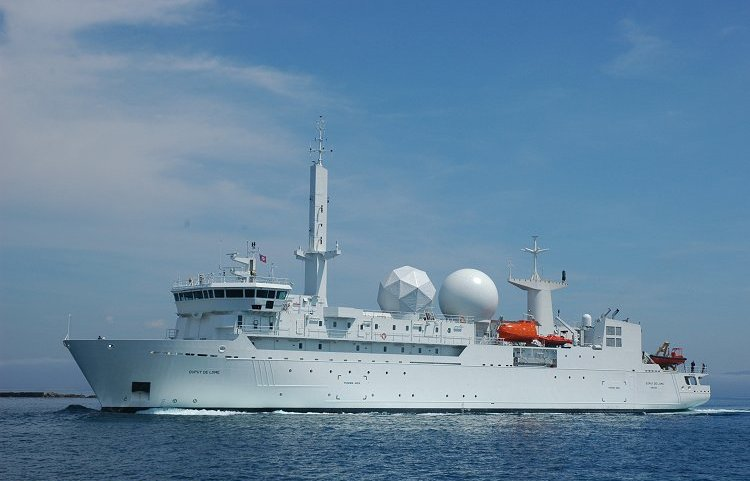
- Dupuy de Lôme underway

History

France
- Name: Dupuy de Lôme
- Namesake: Henri Dupuy de Lôme
- Builder: Royal Niestern Sander, Delfzijl
- Yard number: 816
- Launched: 27 March 2004
- Commissioned: April 2006
- Identification: IMO number: 9282156; MMSI number: 228716000; Callsign: FALM
- Status: In active service

General characteristics
- Displacement: 3,100 t (3,600 t full load)
- Length: 101.75 m (333.8 ft)
- Beam: 15.85 m (52.0 ft)
- Draught: 4.9 m (16 ft)
- Propulsion: 2 Mak 9M25 diesels
- Speed: 16 knots (30 km/h; 18 mph)
- Range: 6,300 km (3,400 nmi; 3,900 mi)
- Complement: 8 officers, 16 Warrant officers, 6 quarter-masters, 78 engineers
- Sensors & processing systems: 2 DRBN38A navigation radars
- Electronic warfare & decoys: ARBR-21 radar detector; goniometer for satellite communication interception; goniometer for Elite communication interception; goniometer for Egide Naval communication interception
- Armament: 2 × 12.7 mm M2 Browing machine guns

Dupuy de Lôme (A759), named after the 19th century engineer Henri Dupuy de Lôme, is a ship designed for the collection of signals and communications beyond enemy lines, which entered the service of the French Navy in April 2006. In contrast to Bougainville, the ship that she replaced, Dupuy de Lôme was specifically designed for sea intelligence, pursuant to the MINREM project (Moyen Interarmées Naval de Recherche ElectroMagnétique, "Joint Naval Resources for Electromagnetic Research").

== Design and description ==
Overview of the main systems

Dupuy de Lôme was designed and built by Royal Niestern Sander shipyards in Delfzijl, The Netherlands with yard number 816. The Thales Naval France designed the electromagnetic intelligence part of the vessel. She provides a 350-day-operational availability a year, out of which 240 can be spent at sea. The ship is operated by two naval crews, each composed of thirty-three sailors and another thirty-three technicians, and an optional complement of up to thirty-eight specialists, depending on the mission. The specialised personnel operates under the Direction du renseignement militaire.

== Construction and career ==
On 21 June 2015, Dupuy de Lôme entered the Black Sea along with USS Laboon as part of NATO's presence missions following the Annexation of Crimea by the Russian Federation.

In October 2021, during rising tensions between China and Taiwan, France confirmed that Dupuy de Lôme had been present in the Taiwan Strait recently, having been last seen sailing from Japan on 1 October 2021.

== Other sources ==
- Dupuy de Lôme, Ministry of Defence
- Navire collecteur de renseignements Dupuy de Lôme, netmarine.net
