= Amphibious transport dock =

Transport ship for carrying and landing amphibious forces

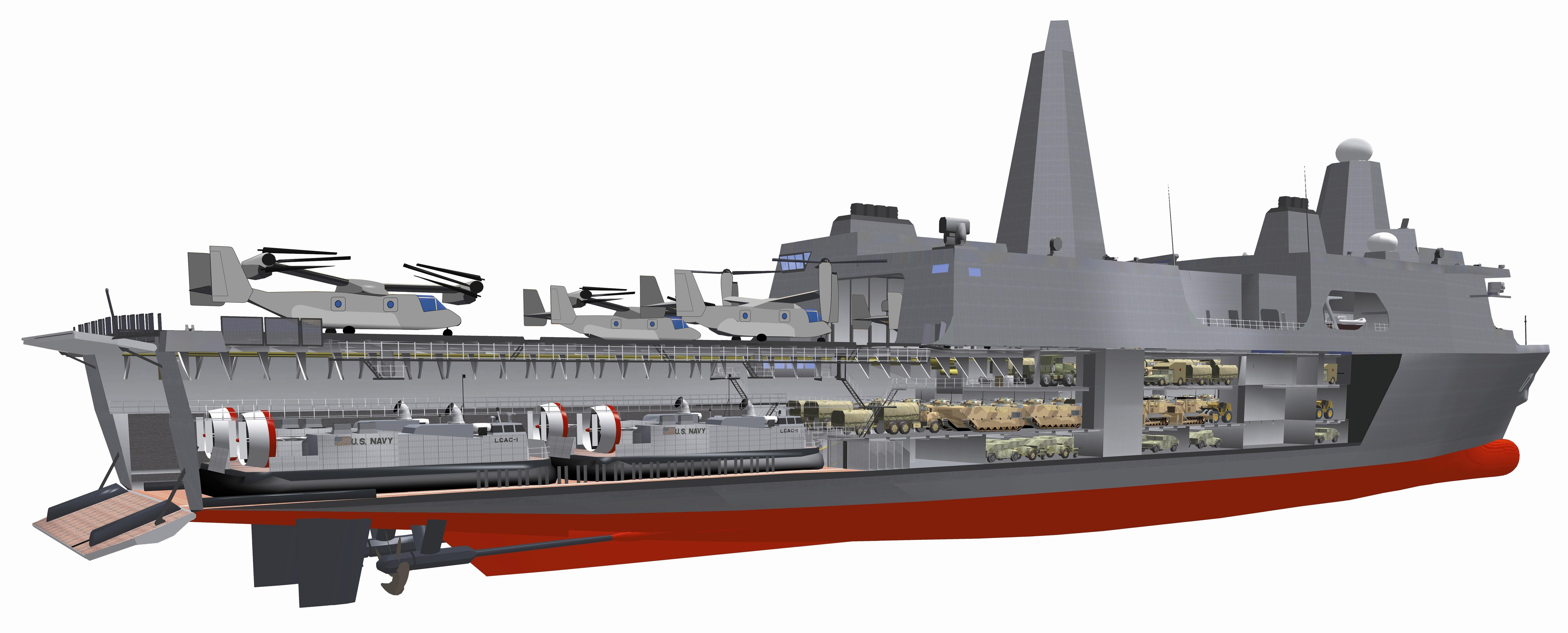
The interior configuration of the United States Navy's San Antonio-class amphibious transport dock shows features common to most LPDs

An amphibious transport dock, also called a landing platform dock (LPD), is an amphibious warfare ship, a warship that embarks, transports, and lands elements of a landing force for expeditionary warfare missions. Several navies operate this kind of ship. The ships are generally designed to transport troops into a war zone by sea, primarily using landing craft, although invariably they also have the capability to operate transport helicopters.

Amphibious transport docks perform the mission of amphibious transports, amphibious cargo ships, and the older dock landing ships (LSD) by incorporating both a flight deck and a well deck that can be ballasted and deballasted to support landing craft or amphibious vehicles. The main difference between LSDs and LPDs is that while both have helicopter landing decks, the LPD also has hangar facilities for protection and maintenance. In the United States Navy, the newer class of LPD has succeeded the older classes of LSDs, and both the Navy and United States Marine Corps are looking to the LPD to be the basis of their new LX(R) program to replace their LSDs.

== LPD classes ==
| Country/Territory | Class | In service | Commissioned | Length | Beam | Draft | Displacement (mt) | Note | Image |
|---|---|---|---|---|---|---|---|---|---|
| Algeria | Kalaat Béni Abbès | 1 | 2015 | 143 m (469 ft) | 21.5 m (71 ft) | 5.3 m (17 ft) | 9,000 | Improved San Giorgio-class built in Italy. | |
| Australia | HMAS Choules | 1 | 2011 | 176.6 m (579 ft) | 26.9 m (88 ft) | 5.8 m (19 ft) | 16,160 | Ex-British Largs Bay (L3006) sold to Australian Navy in 2011, renamed Choules (L100). | |
| Brazil | Bahia | 1 | 2016 | 168 m (551 ft) | 23.5 m (77 ft) | 5.2 m (17 ft) | 12,000 | Ex-French Siroco (L9012) sold to Brazil Navy in 2015, renamed Bahia (G40). | |
| Brazil | NDM Oiapoque | 1 | 2025 | 176 m (577 ft) | 28.9 m (95 ft) | 7.1 m (23 ft) | 19,560 | Ex-British Albion class ship HMS Bulwark sold to Brazil and renamed NDM Oiapoque in 2025. | |
| Chile | Sargento Aldea | 1 | 2011 | 168 m (551 ft) | 23.5 m (77 ft) | 5.2 m (17 ft) | 12,000 | Ex-French Foudre (L9011) sold to Chile Navy in 2011, renamed Sargento Aldea (LSDH-91). | |
| China | Type 071 (Yuzhao) | 8 | 2007 | 210 m (690 ft) | 28 m (92 ft) | 7 m (23 ft) | 25,000 | | |
| India | Jalashwa | 1 | 2007 | 173.7 m (570 ft) | 32 m (105 ft) | 6.7 m (22 ft) | 16,600 | Ex-USS Trenton (LPD-14) sold to the Indian Navy in 2007, renamed INS Jalashwa (L41). | |
| Indonesia | Makassar | 5 | 2007 | 122–125 m (400–410 ft) | 22 m (72 ft) | 4.9 m (16 ft) | 11,394 | Designed by Daesun Shipbuilding & Engineering Co., first two units were built in South Korea. | |
| Italy | San Giorgio | 3 | 1987 | 133 m (436 ft) | 20.5 m (67 ft) | | 7,650 (San Giorgio and San Marco); 7,980 (San Giusto) | | |
| Japan | Ōsumi | 3 | 1998 | 178 m (584 ft) | 25.8 m (85 ft) | 6.0 m (19.7 ft) | 14,000 | | |
| Myanmar | Makassar | 1 | 2019 | 122–125 m (400–410 ft) | 22 m (72 ft) | 4.9 m (16 ft) | 11,394 | UMS Moattama, built in South Korea. | |
| Netherlands | Rotterdam | 2 | 1997 | 166 m (545 ft) | 27 m (89 ft) | 6.0 m (19.7 ft) | 12,750 (RD); 16,800 (JW) | | |
| Peru | Makassar | 2 | 2018 | 122 m (400 ft) | 22 m (72 ft) | 4.9 m (16 ft) | 11,394 | Built in Peru. | |
| Philippines | Tarlac | 4 | 2016 | 123 m (404 ft) | 21.8 m (72 ft) | 5.0 m (16.4 ft) | 11,583 | Subclass of the Makassar-class built in Indonesia. | |
| Qatar | Al Fulk | 1 | fitting out | 143 m (469 ft) | 21.5 m (71 ft) | 5.3 m (17 ft) | 9,000 | Improved San Giorgio-class built in Italy. | |
| Singapore | Endurance | 4 | 2000 | 141 m (463 ft) | 21 m (69 ft) | 5.0 m (16.4 ft) | 8,500 | | |
| Spain | Galicia | 2 | 1998 | 166 m (545 ft) | 25 m (82 ft) | 5.8 m (19 ft) | 13,815 | | |
| Taiwan | Yushan | 1 | 2021 | 153 m (502 ft) | 23 m (75 ft) | 6.0 m (19.7 ft) | 10,600 | | |
| Thailand | Angthong | 1 | 2012 | 141 m (463 ft) | 21 m (69 ft) | 5.0 m (16.4 ft) | 8,500 | Based on the Endurance-class, built in Singapore. | |
| Thailand | Chang | 1 | 2023 | 213 m (699 ft) | 28 m (92 ft) | 7 m (23 ft) | 22,000 | Export version of the Chinese Type 071 amphibious transport dock. | |
| United Kingdom | Bay | 3 | 2007 | 176.6 m (579 ft) | 26.9 m (88 ft) | 5.8 m (19 ft) | 16,160 | | |
| United States | San Antonio | 12 | 2006 | 208 m (682 ft) | 32 m (105 ft) | 7.0 m (23.0 ft) | 25,300 | | USS San Antonio |

=== Decommissioned ===
| Country | Class | Out of service | Commissioned | Length | Beam | Draft | Displacement (mt) | Note | Image |
|---|---|---|---|---|---|---|---|---|---|
| France | Ouragan | 2 | 1963–2007 | 149 m (489 ft) | 21.5 m (71 ft) | 5.4 m (18 ft) | 8,500 | | |
| France | Bougainville | 1 | 1988–2008 | 113.50 m (372.4 ft) | 17.00 m (55.77 ft) | 4.24 m (13.9 ft) | 4,870 | | |
| France | Foudre | 2 | 1990–2015 | 168 m (551 ft) | 23.5 m (77 ft) | 5.2 m (17 ft) | 12,000 | Sold to Chile and Brazil. | |
| Indonesia | Tanjung Dalpele | 1 | 2003-2007 | 122 m (400 ft) | 22 m (72 ft) | 4.9 m (16 ft) | 11,394 | Converted to a hospital ship in 2007, renamed KRI Dr Soeharso (990). | |
| United Kingdom | Fearless | 2 | 1965-2002 | 158.5 m (520 ft) | 24.4 m (80 ft) | 6.3 m (21 ft) | 16,950 | Scrapped between 2002 and 2008. HMS Ocean provided amphibious cover until the two ships of the Albion class were available. | |
| United Kingdom | Albion | 2 | 2003-2025 | 176 m (577 ft) | 28.9 m (95 ft) | 7.1 m (23 ft) | 19,560 | Albion class ships HMS Albion and HMS Bulwark decommissioned in 2025. HMS Bulwark sold to Brazil and renamed NDM Oiapoque in 2025. | |
| United States | Raleigh | 3 | 1962–2005 | 159 m (522 ft) | 30 m (98 ft) | 7.0 m (23.0 ft) | 13,818 | USS La Salle (LPD-3) converted from Landing Platform Dock to Auxiliary Flagship and redesignated as USS La Salle (AGF-3) in 1972. | |
| United States | Austin | 3 | 1965–2007 | 173 m (568 ft) | 32 m (105 ft) | 6.7 m (22 ft) | 16,914 | | |
| United States | Austin (Cleveland subclass) | 7 | 1967–2014 | 173 m (568 ft) | 32 m (105 ft) | 6.7 m (22 ft) | 16,914 | Some sources consider Cleveland (seven built) to be a part of the Austin class. USS Coronado (LPD-11) converted from Landing Platform Dock to Auxiliary Flagship and redesignated as USS Coronado (AGF-11) in 1980. | |
| United States | Austin (Trenton subclass) | 2 | 1971–2017 | 173 m (568 ft) | 32 m (105 ft) | 6.7 m (22 ft) | 16,914 | Some sources consider Trenton (two built) ships to be a part of the Austin class. Ex-USS Trenton (LPD-14) sold to the Indian Navy and in active service with Indian Navy. USS Ponce (LPD-15) converted (AFSB(I)-15). | |

== Gallery ==
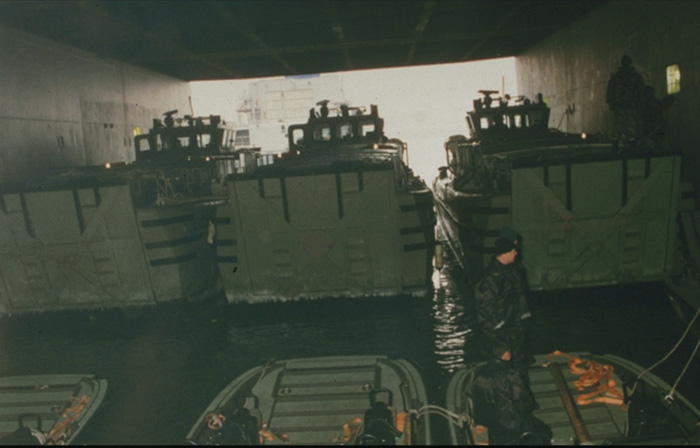
The well deck of HNLMS Rotterdam

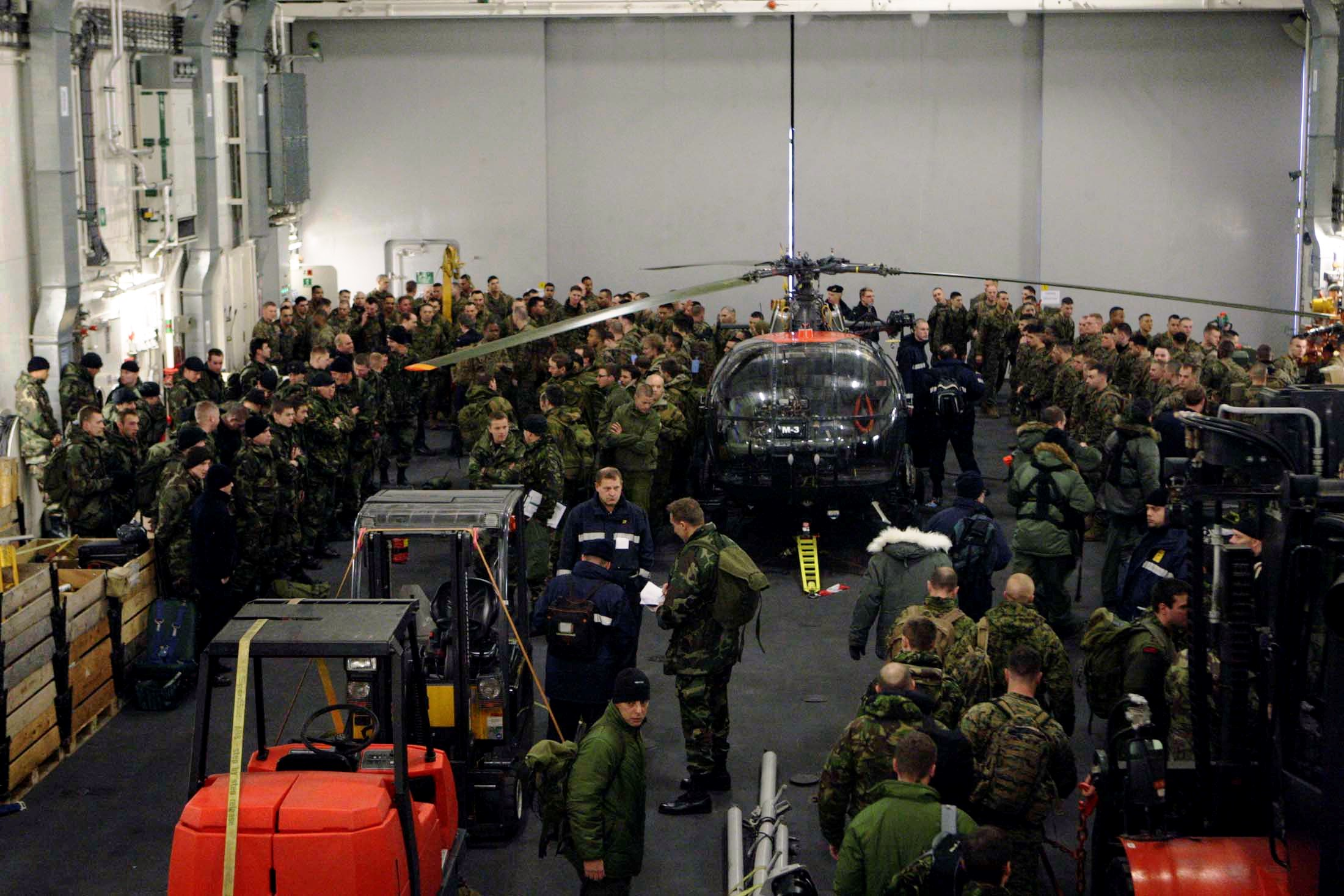
Aviation hangar of the Rotterdam-class HNLMS Johan de Witt

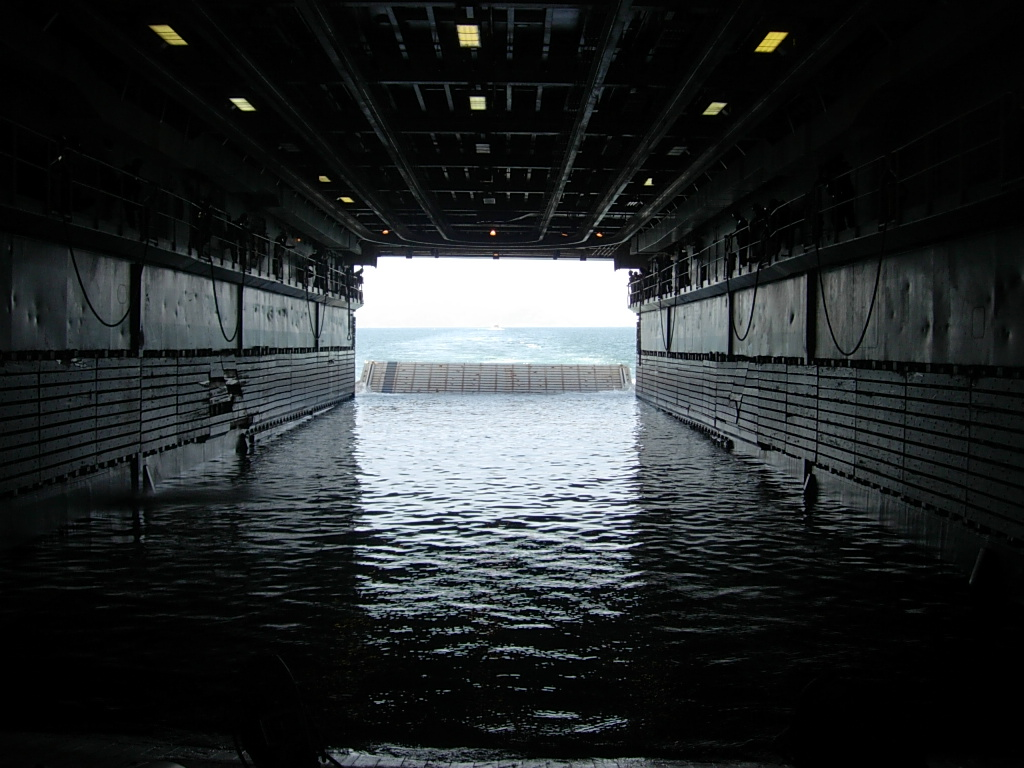
Stern of USS Juneau ballasted for amphibious operations

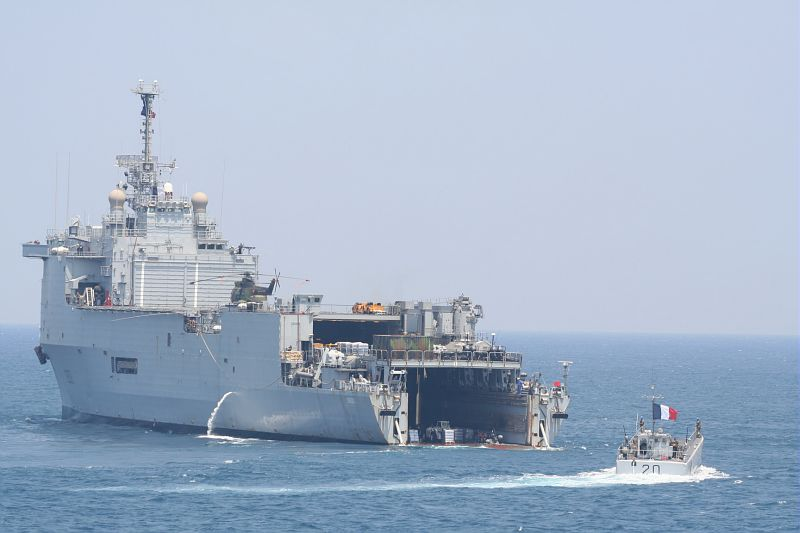
The open well deck of the French ship Siroco

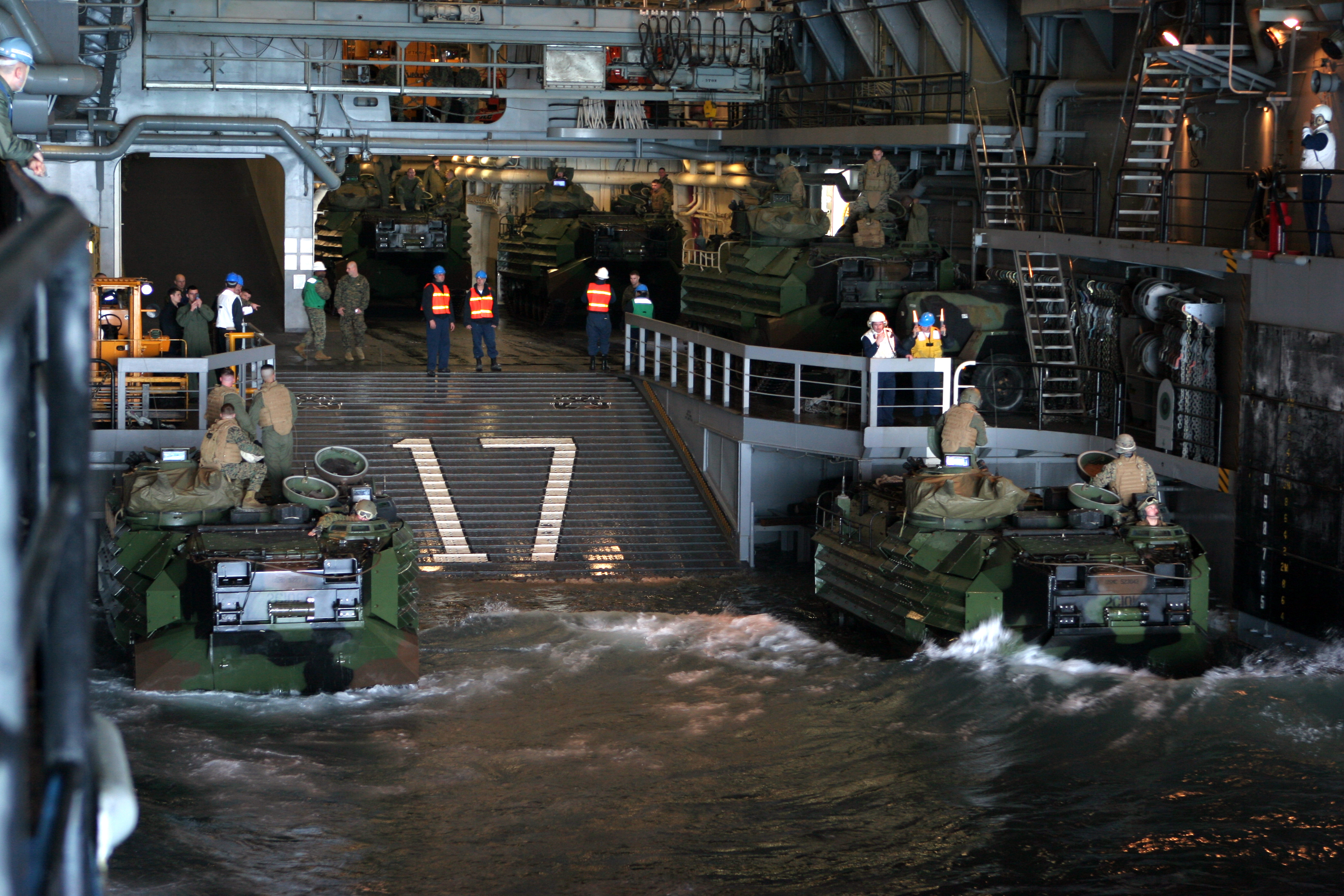
The well deck of USS San Antonio

== See also ==
- Amphibious warfare ship
- Dock landing ship
- Landing Platform Helicopter
- List of amphibious warfare ships
- List of United States Navy amphibious warfare ships § Landing Platform Dock (LPD)
