= Engin de débarquement d'infanterie et de chars =

Landing craft

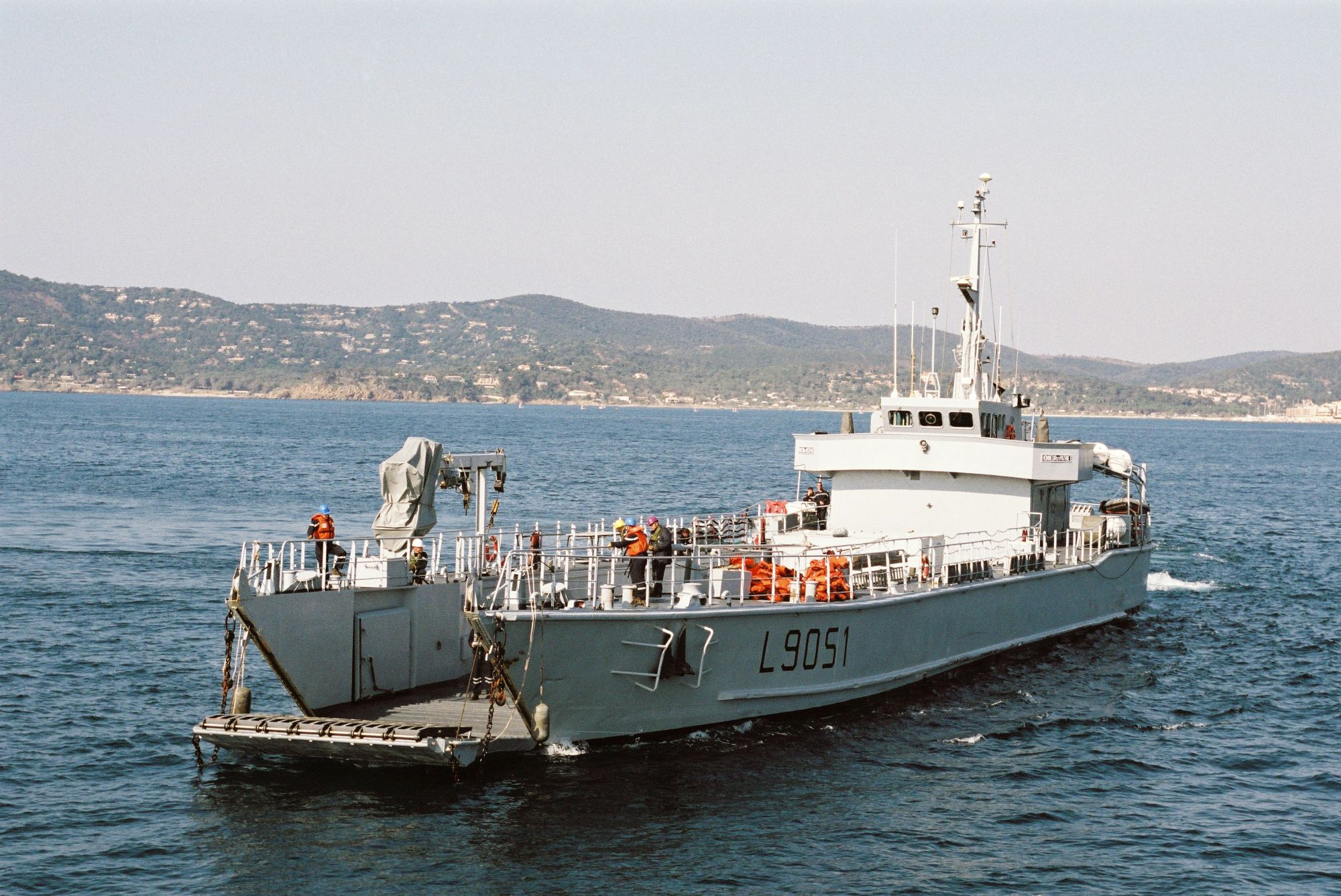
- EDIC Sabre

Class overview
- Name: Engin de débarquement d'infanterie et de chars (EDIC)
- Operators: French Navy; Lebanese Navy; Madagascar Navy; Senegal Navy
- Subclasses: EDA
- Completed: 17

General characteristics of EDIC III ships
- Type: Landing craft utility
- Displacement: 330–371 t (325–365 long tons) (standard); 748 t (736 long tons) (full load)
- Length: 59 m (193 ft 7 in)
- Beam: 11.6 m (38 ft 1 in)
- Draught: 1.7 m (5 ft 7 in)
- Ramps: 1 bow ramp
- Propulsion: 2 SACM Uni Diesel UD30 V12 M3 diesel engines; 2 propellers, 1,000 kW (1,400 hp)
- Speed: 12 knots (22 km/h; 14 mph)
- Range: 1,800 nmi (3,300 km; 2,100 mi) at 12 knots
- Capacity: 200 t (200 long tons)
- Troops: 180
- Complement: 10
- Sensors & processing systems: Racal Decca 226 radar
- Armament: 2 × 20 mm modèle F2 guns; 2 × 12.7 mm (0.50 in) machine guns

The EDIC or Engin de débarquement d'infanterie et de chars are large landing craft that operate in the French Navy, Lebanese Navy, Senegalese Navy, and Madagascar Navy. EDICs have the typical landing craft utility design with a bow ramp and have a large aft superstructure compared to the derivative CDIC. The EDIC vessels were constructed in three groups, the first were launched in 1958, the second in 1967–1969 and the third in 1987. A sub class, called the Engin de débarquement ateliers or EDA was constructed between the first and second groups but were fitted out as repair craft. In French service, they predominantly were used in the French Pacific territories.

== Design and description ==
The EDIC type landing craft were constructed in three batches and had differences between them. They were designed as tank landing craft for the French Navy. The first and second batches as built had a standard displacement of 297 tonnes (292 long tons) and 652 tonnes (642 long tons) at full load. They were 59.0 metres (193 ft 5 in) long with a beam of 11.9 metres (39 ft 2 in) and a draught of 1.3 metres (4 ft 5 in). They were powered by two MGO diesel engines driving two shafts rated at 750 kilowatts (1,000 bhp). They had a maximum speed of 8 knots (15 km/h; 9.2 mph) and a complement of 16 including one officer. They could carry eleven trucks or five tracked landing vehicles. They mounted two 20 mm (0.8 in) anti-aircraft (AA) guns.

The third EDIC group were constructed to a modified design with a standard displacement of 330–371 tonnes (325–365 long tons) and 748 tonnes (736 long tons) at full load. The vessels measure 59 m (193 ft 7 in) long with a beam of 11.6 m (38 ft 1 in) and a draught of 1.7 m (5 ft 7 in). They are powered by two SACM Uni Diesel UD30 V12 M3 diesel engines driving two shafts rated at 1,000 kW (1,400 hp). They have a maximum speed of 12 knots (22 km/h; 14 mph) and a range of 1,800 nautical miles (3,300 km; 2,100 mi) at 12 knots. The EDIC III type have capacity for 200 t (200 long tons) of vehicles and can carry up to 180 personnel. They landing craft have a complement of ten. They mount a Racal Decca 226 radar, two 20 mm modèle F2 guns for AA defence and two 12.7 mm (0.5 in) machine guns.

=== Lebanese Navy ===
Two vessels in service with the Lebanese Navy are of EDIC III design. They have a displacement of 680 tonnes (670 long tons) at full load and measure 59 metres (193 ft 7 in) long with a beam of 12 metres (39 ft 4 in) and a draught of 1.3 metres (4 ft 3 in). The two landing craft are powered by two SACM MGO 175 V12 M1 diesel engines turning two shafts rated at 890 kilowatts (1,200 hp). The ships have a maximum speed of 10 knots (19 km/h; 12 mph) and a range of 1,800 nautical miles (3,300 km; 2,100 mi) at 9 knots (17 km/h; 10 mph). They can carry up to 96 troops and 11 lightweight fighting vehicles such as AML 90, Humvees or M113 armored personnel carrier. The vessels mount two Oerlikon 20 mm cannon, one 81 mm (3.2 in) mortar, two 12.7 mm machine guns and one 7.62 mm (0.3 in) machine gun.

=== EDA type ===
Four ships were constructed to similar dimensions and propulsion system to the first two EDIC groups in 1964–1965 and called the Engin de débarquement ateliers or EDA. Instead of being landing craft, they were equipped as repair and logistics ships for service on overseas stations. L 9084 was classified as an auxiliary electrical stores ship.

== Ships in class ==
EDIC construction data
Pennant	Name	Launched	Commissioned	Status
EDIC I
	L 9091	7 January 1956	3 January 1959	
	L 9092	21 February 1958	17 February 1959	
	L 9093	17 April 1958	17 February 1959	
	L 9094	24 July 1958	12 June 1959	
	L 9095	11 April 1958		Sold to Senegal in 1974. Renamed La Falence.
	L 9096	11 October 1958	15 May 1959	
EDA
	L 9081	1964		
	L 9082	1964	17 June 1965	Transferred to Madagascar in 1985 and renamed Aine Vao Vao.
	L 9083	1964	5 February 1966	
	L 9084	1964	5 November 1965	
EDIC II
	L 9070	30 October 1967	29 March 1969	
	L 9071	30 January 1968		
	L 9072	1968	2 May 1969	
	L 9073	1968	10 May 1969	
	L 9074	1969	7 February 1970	
EDIC III (Type 700)
L 9051	Sabre	13 June 1987		
L 9052	Dague	19 December 1987		
Lebanese Navy versions
21	Sour		28 March 1985	
22	Damour		28 March 1985	

== Construction and career ==
The EDIC I and IIs were constructed at various shipyards. Seven were built by Chantier Naval Franco-Belge, three by the Toulon Dockyard and two by La Perrière in France. The EDIC IIIs were built by SFCN at Villeneuve-la-Garenne, France. On 1 July 1974 L 9095 was transferred to Senegal and renamed La Falence. Most of the class was deployed to the French territories in the Pacific. In 1981, L 9082 was paid off. On 28 September 1985, L 9082 was sold to Madagascar and renamed Aina Vao Vao. The ship was repaired in 1996. L 9083 and L 9073 were stricken from the French Navy in 1986, L 9091, L 9093, L 9096 in 1988, L 9094 in 1991 and L 9072 in 1993. Sabre and Dague were given their names on 29 April 1999.

On 7 November 1983, the Lebanese Navy loaned L 9096 from the French Navy and renamed the vessel Sour. The ship was later returned to the French Navy. That year, they ordered two EDIC III vessels from SFCN to be built in Villeneuve-la-Garenne, France. The two ships, named Sour and Damour, were commissioned into the Lebanese Navy on 28 March 1991. Both had been damaged in 1990 and repaired the following year.

== See also ==
- Chaland de débarquement d'infanterie et de chars
- Ç107-class landing ship
