= Chaland de transport de matériel =

French landing craft class

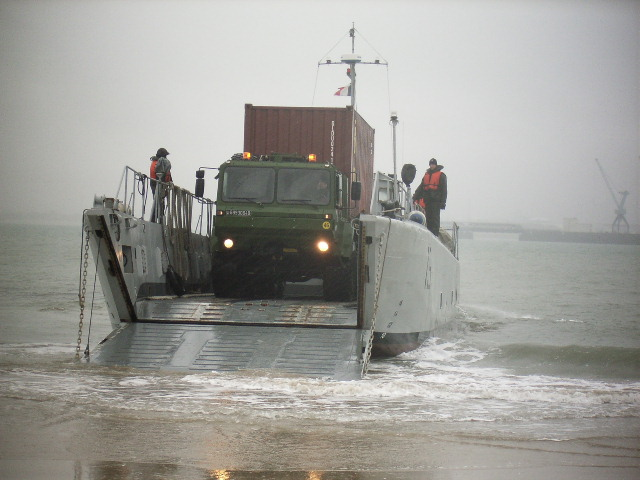
- A maritime container vehicle on board a CTM

Class overview
- Operators: French Navy; Djiboutian Navy; Chilean Navy; Ivory Coast Navy; Royal Moroccan Navy; Senegal Navy
- Completed: 31
- Active: 5 remaining with the French Navy as of 2023; others with other navies
- Retired: 11+

General characteristics
- Type: Landing craft
- Displacement: 150 tonnes (150 long tons) (max)
- Length: 23.8 m (78 ft 1 in)
- Beam: 6.35 m (20 ft 10 in)
- Draught: 1.25 m (4 ft 1 in)
- Propulsion: 2 × Poyaud-Wärtsilä 18V8M1 diesel engines, 331 kilowatts (444 hp); 2 propellers
- Speed: 9.5 knots (17.6 km/h; 10.9 mph)
- Range: 380 nmi (700 km; 440 mi) at 8 knots (15 km/h; 9.2 mph)
- Capacity: 90 t (89 long tons; 99 short tons)
- Troops: 200
- Complement: 4
- Armament: 2 × 12.7 mm (0.50 in) machine guns

The Chaland de transport de matériel (CTM) is a French landing craft class, also operated by the navies of Chile, Djibouti, Ivory Coast, Morocco and Senegal. The design is based on the American LCM-8-class landing craft and were initially ordered to support France's nuclear testing in the Pacific. Constructed in two batches, the first batch of 16 vessels have been removed from French service with some transferred to other navies, the others being discarded. The second batch consisting of 17 vessels is split, with some being transferred to other nations and some remaining in service with the French Navy. The remaining vessels in French service are being replaced with a new landing craft design. As of January 2023, it was reported that only five of the landing craft remained in French Navy service.

== Description ==
The CTMs are landing craft that are derived from the American LCM-8 class. They measure 23.8 metres (78 ft 1 in) long with a beam of 6.35 metres (20 ft 10 in) and a draught of 1.25 metres (4 ft 1 in). Each ship has a bow ramp. They have a standard displacement between 48 and 56 tonnes (47 and 55 long tons) and fully loaded displacement of 150 tonnes (150 long tons). The vessels are propelled by two propellers that were initially driven by two Poyaud 520 V8 diesel engines capable of creating 330 kilowatts (440 hp). (Note: Saunders has them named as Poyaud V8520NS diesel engines.) They were later exchanged for Poyaud-Wärtsilä 18V8M1 diesels creating 340 kW (450 bhp). This gave the CTMs a maximum speed of 9.5 knots (17.6 km/h; 10.9 mph). The ships carry 3.4 tonnes (3.3 long tons) of fuel and have a range of 380 nautical miles (700 km; 440 mi) at 8 knots (15 km/h; 9.2 mph). The landing craft have capacity for 90 tonnes (89 long tons) of cargo and room for 200 personnel. They are equipped with a small navigational radar and two 12.7-millimetre (0.50 in) machine guns. The machine guns are often not mounted. The vessels had an initial complement of 6, declining to 4.

== Construction and career ==
The CTMs were constructed in two batches. The first three ships of the first batch were ordered on 18 July 1964. Further orders were placed in 1965 and 1966. The first batch consisting of CTM 1 to CTM 16, was constructed in the 1960s to support nuclear testing in the Pacific. A second series was ordered in 1982 to replace the older, worn out units. Six units were operated by the French Army, but were returned to the navy in 2010. Several vessels have since been transferred to navies around the world, including Morocco, Senegal, Ivory Coast, Chile and Brazil while others have been cannibalised for spare parts.

== Ships in class ==
Chaland de transport de matériel construction data
Number	Name	Builder	In service	Fate
CTM 1		CMN, Cherbourg, France	1965	Disarmed 31 March 1982 and sold for scrap in 1985.
CTM 2		CMN, Cherbourg, France	1965	Stricken in 1999 and transferred to Morocco in May 1999. (Note: Netmarine and Wertheim disagree on the dates of service. Netmarine has the vessel disarmed 10 January 1990 and transferred to Senegal on 1 October 1999 after being initially designated for Morocco.)
CTM 3		CMN, Cherbourg, France	1965	Disarmed in 2004 and sold for scrap in 2012.
CTM 4		C.N. Auroux, Arcachon, France	1966	Removed from service on 21 April 1986 and sunk as a target ship off Papeete in 2001.
CTM 5		C.N. Auroux, Arcachon, France	1966	Placed in reserve in 1998. Stricken in 1999 and transferred to Senegal in May 1999. (Note: Netmarine and Wertheim disagree on the dates of service. Netmarine has the vessel disarmed on 1 August 2000 and transferred to Morocco after being initially designated for Senegal.)
CTM 6		CMN, Cherbourg, France	1966	Sunk as a target ship on 20 October 1988 off Papeete.
CTM 7		CMN, Cherbourg, France	1966	Stricken on 6 September 1985 after being sunk as a target ship on 19 August 1985.
CTM 8		CMN, Cherbourg, France	1967	Stricken 6 September 1985.
CTM 9	Mayumba	CMN, Cherbourg, France	1967	Stricken 1999. (Note: Netmarine and Wertheim disagree on the dates of service. Netmarine has the vessel stricken on 18 April 2000 and sunk as a target ship in the Mediterranean Sea on 24 May 2001.)
CTM 10	Guéréro	CMN, Cherbourg, France	1967	Stricken 1999. (Note: Netmarine and Wertheim disagree on the dates of service. Netmarine has the vessel stricken on 18 November 1997 and sunk as a target ship on 5 May 2001 in the Mediterranean Sea.)
CTM 11		C.N. Auroux, Arcachon, France	1967	Stricken 4 August 1983 and sunk as a target ship off Papeete in 1984.
CTM 12		CMN, Cherbourg, France	1967	Cannibalised for spare parts. Stricken 24 February 2000 and sold in 2001 to private interests.
CTM 13		CMN, Cherbourg, France	1967	Stricken 11 April 1995, the vessel sank after being towed out to sea and scuttled.
CTM 14	Tchibana	CMN, Cherbourg, France	1967	Taken out of service in 1999 and transferred to the Djiboutian Navy.
CTM 15	Koutio	CMN, Cherbourg, France	1972	Stricken 1999 and transferred to the Ivory Coast in March 1999. The vessel was renamed Aby.
CTM 16		CMN, Cherbourg, France	1972	Cannibalised for spare parts. Stricken 1999 and transferred to the Ivory Coast in March 1999. The vessel was renamed Tiagha.
CTM 17		C.N. Auroux, Arcachon, France	1982	Status unclear as of 2023
CTM 18		C.N. Auroux, Arcachon, France	1982	Status unclear as of 2023
CTM 19	Do Ha	CMN, Cherbourg, France	1983	Transferred to Chile in 2011. Renamed Fuentes or Reyes
CTM 20	Néké Grav	CMN, Cherbourg, France	1983	Status unclear as of 2023
CTM 21	Guéréro	CMN, Cherbourg, France	1983	Status unclear as of 2023
CTM 22	Kien An	CMN, Cherbourg, France	1982	Status unclear as of 2023
CTM 23	Song Can	CMN, Cherbourg, France	1983	Status unclear as of 2023
CTM 24		CMN, Cherbourg, France	1984	Transferred to Chile in 2011. Renamed Fuentes or Reyes
CTM 25		CMN, Cherbourg, France	1984	Status unclear as of 2023
CTM 26		CMN, Cherbourg, France	1985	Status unclear as of 2023
CTM 27	Indochine	CMN, Cherbourg, France	1986	Status unclear as of 2023
CTM 28	Tonkin	CMN, Cherbourg, France	1988	Status unclear as of 2023
CTM 29	Nui Dho	CMN, Cherbourg, France	1988	Status unclear as of 2023
CTM 30	Tchibana	CMN, Cherbourg, France	1989	Status unclear as of 2023
CTM 31	Koutio	CMN, Cherbourg, France	1992	Status unclear as of 2023

== Replacement ==
A new landing craft was developed by STX France and DCNS, called the CTM NG, with the CTM referring to this class and the NG meaning "Nouvelle Génération". These vessels represent an improved design over the Chaland de transport de matériel.

The remaining CTMs are being gradually replaced from 2021 by fourteen new Engins de débarquement amphibie standard (standard amphibious landing craft) – EDA-S – built by SOCARENAM over a period of ten years. With a slightly larger size, they will be deployed from the Mistral class and overseas bases. French forces deployed in overseas bases in Mayotte, New Caledonia, Martinique and French Guiana are to receive one vessel each in order to support local operations. Two vessels are also planned to be deployed for operations around Djibouti. The vessels have a payload capacity of 65 to 80 tonnes at a maximum speed of 11 knots (20 km/h; 13 mph) (at full load). The first two EDA-S vessels (Arbalète and Arquebuse) were delivered to the navy in November 2021 and entered service in July 2022. The next four in the program are intended for the naval base at Toulon and are to start delivery in mid-2023. Deliveries will continue up to 2026.
