= HMS Ocean (L12) =

1998 unique amphibious assault ship of the Royal Navy

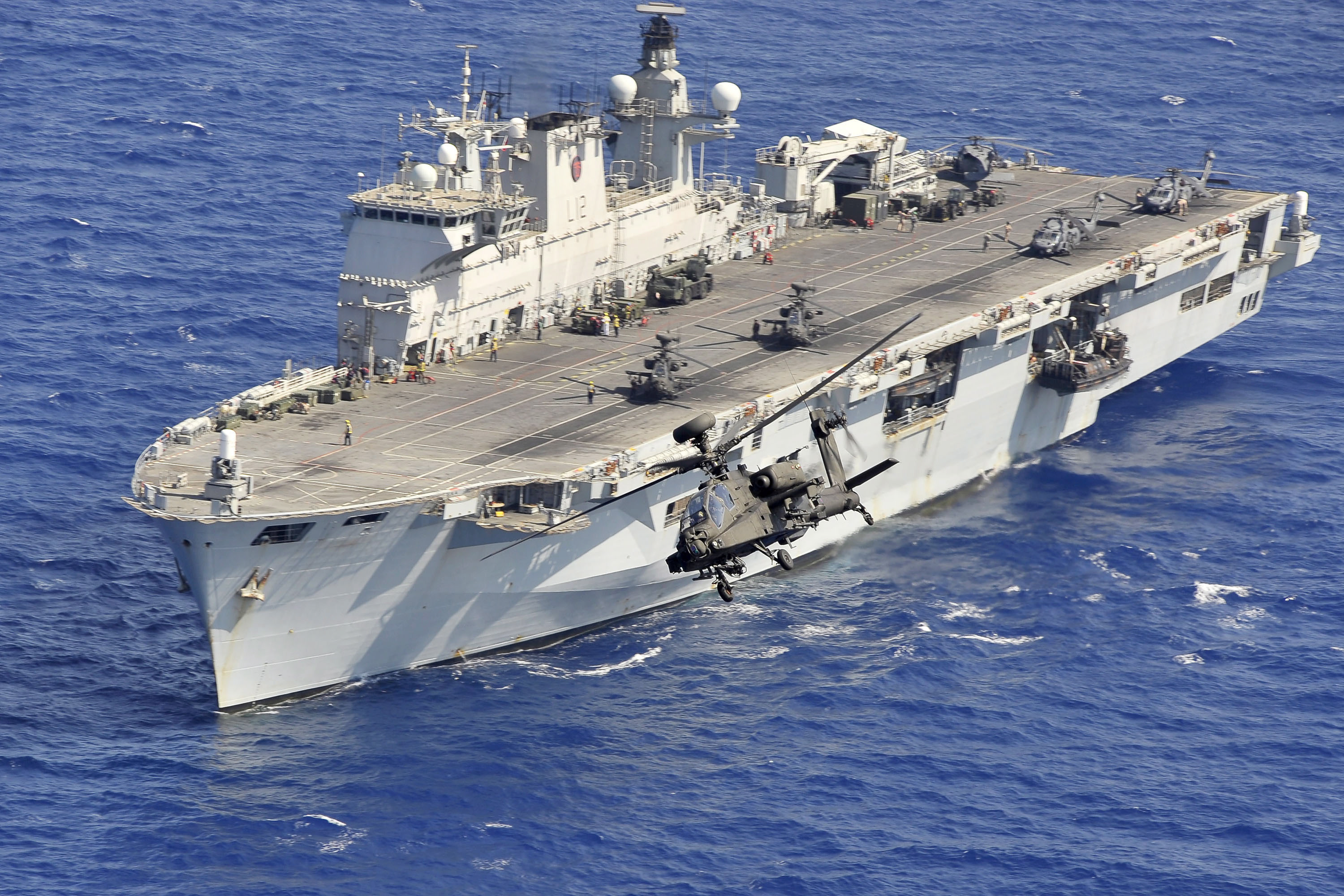
- HMS Ocean during Operation Ellamy and the 2011 military intervention in Libya

History

United Kingdom
- Name: HMS Ocean
- Operator: Royal Navy
- Ordered: 11 May 1993
- Builder: Vickers Shipbuilding and Engineering Ltd, Kværner (Govan)
- Laid down: 30 May 1994
- Launched: 11 October 1995
- Sponsored by: Queen Elizabeth II of the United Kingdom
- Commissioned: 30 September 1998
- Decommissioned: 27 March 2018
- Refit: Major 2012–2014
- Home port: HMNB Devonport, Plymouth
- Identification: IMO number: 9079456; MMSI number: 234643000; Callsign: GCOU; Deck code: O
- Motto: Ex undis surgit victoria (From the waves rises victory)
- Honours and awards: Al Faw 2003
- Fate: Sold to Brazil
- Badge

Brazil
- Name: NAM Atlântico
- Operator: Brazilian Navy
- Acquired: Purchased on 19 February 2018, from the Royal Navy
- Commissioned: 29 June 2018
- Home port: Rio de Janeiro Navy Arsenal
- Identification: IMO number: 9079456; MMSI number: 710509000; Callsign: PWTL; Pennant number: A140
- Motto: Nosso navio, nosso mar (Our ship, our sea)
- Status: Active
- Badge

General characteristics
- Class & type: Landing Platform Helicopter
- Displacement: 21,500 t (21,200 long tons; 23,700 short tons)
- Length: 203.4 m (667 ft)
- Beam: 35 m (115 ft)
- Draught: 6.5 m (21 ft)
- Propulsion: 2 × Crossley Pielstick 12 cylinder
- Speed: 18 knots (21 mph; 33 km/h) cruise; 21 knots (24 mph; 39 km/h) max
- Range: 8,000 miles (13,000 km)
- Boats & landing craft carried: 1 Seaboat (Pacific 22 Mk2); 4 × LCVP Mk5B
- Capacity: 40 vehicles
- Troops: 830 Royal Marines
- Crew: 285 + 180 FAA/RAF
- Sensors & processing systems: Type 997 Artisan radar; Type 1008 Navigational Radar; 2 × Type 1007 Aircraft Control Radar
- Electronic warfare & decoys: UAT Electronic Support Measures; DLH decoy Launchers; Surface Ship Torpedo Defence (SSTD)
- Armament: 4 × 30mm DS30M Mk2 guns; 3 × Phalanx CIWS (removed before transfer to Brazilian Navy); 4 × Miniguns; 8 × General purpose machine guns
- Aircraft carried: Up to 18 helicopters: AgustaWestland AW159 Wildcat; Merlin; Boeing Chinook; Westland Apache; EC725 Caracal (Brazilian Navy); S-70B Seahawk (Brazilian Navy); AS350 Écureuil (Brazilian Navy)
- Aviation facilities: Large flight deck; Hangar deck; Helicopter lifts; Vehicle deck

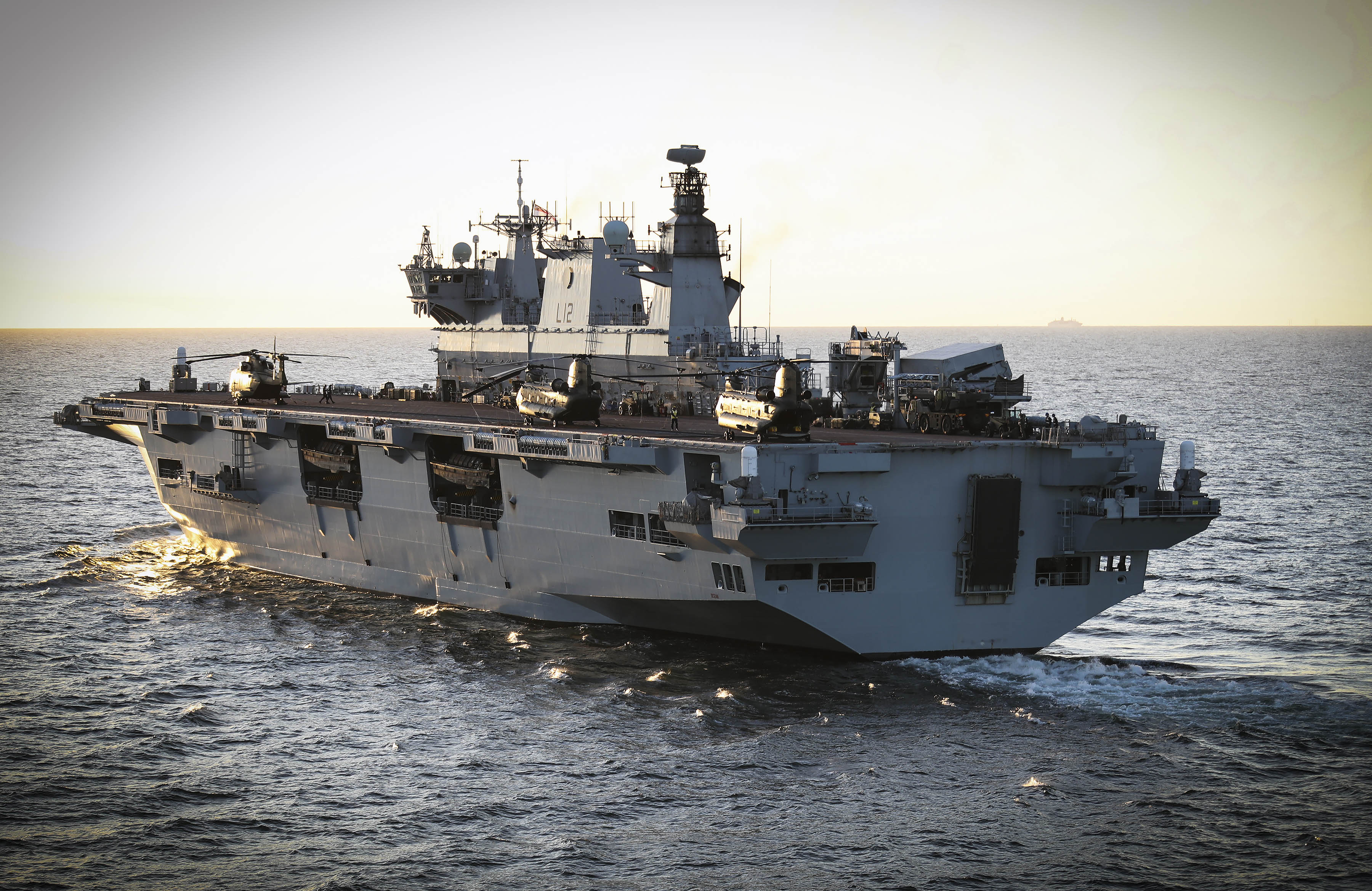
Stern view showing ramp and davits

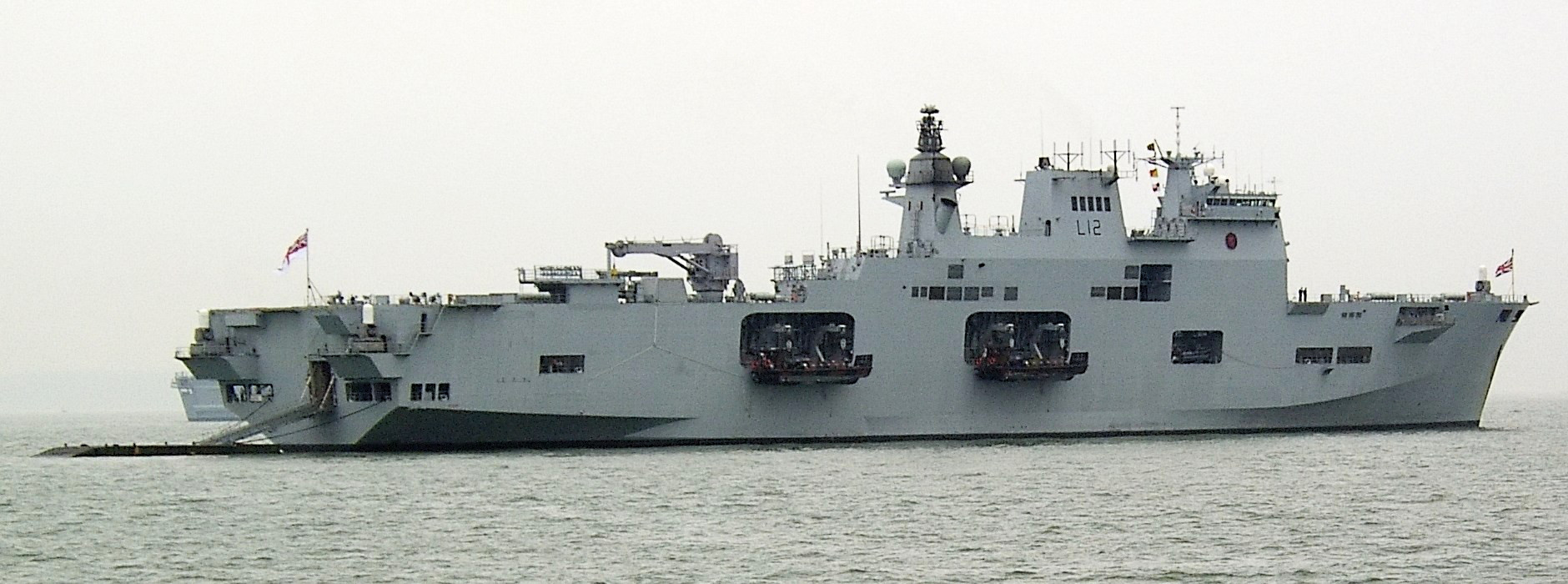
HMS Ocean showing landing craft on davits and stern ramp deployed

HMS Ocean was a landing platform helicopter, formerly the UK's helicopter carrier and the fleet flagship of the Royal Navy. She was designed to support amphibious landing operations and to support the staff of Commander UK Amphibious Force and Commander UK Landing Force. She was constructed in the mid-1990s by Kvaerner Govan on the River Clyde and fitted out by VSEL at Barrow-in-Furness prior to trials and subsequent acceptance in service. Ocean was commissioned in September 1998 at her home port HMNB Devonport, Plymouth.

In December 2017, the Brazilian Navy confirmed the purchase of the ship for £84.6 million. Following her decommissioning from Royal Navy service on 27 March 2018, she arrived in Rio de Janeiro on 25 August 2018, rechristened as the Atlântico and now serves as the flagship of the Brazilian Navy.

== Background ==
An invitation to tender for a new helicopter carrier was issued in February 1992. In February 1993 The Times reported that the carrier faced cancellation due to budgetary constraints. However, at approximately the same time, British forces were engaged in operations in the Balkans, which saw the Royal Fleet Auxiliary's aviation training ship RFA Argus pressed into service as an amphibious transport ship. Argus's accommodation and facilities proved inadequate for the needs of a large Embarked Military Force (EMF), which emphasised the need for a purpose-built platform. On 29 March 1993, the defence procurement minister announced that development of the new Landing Platform Helicopter (LPH) was proceeding. Two shipbuilders tendered for the contract – Vickers Shipbuilding and Engineering Ltd (VSEL) and Swan Hunter. On 11 May 1993, the government announced that VSEL had won the contract. The build was to commercial standards, reducing costs significantly and leading to a construction spend of £154 million (£331 million in 2025),, comparable to that of a Type 23 frigate. VSEL, a warship manufacturer, sub-contracted the build phase to the commercial Kværner yard in Govan, Glasgow.

That VSEL's bid was £71 million lower than Swan Hunter's was the source of political controversy and led to a National Audit Office investigation to determine whether the competition was fair. The report, published on 29 July 1993, stated that, although VSEL did subsidise its bid, the Ministry of Defence (MOD) was right to award the contract to VSEL because the subsidy was much smaller than the difference between the two bids; VSEL's bid was £139.5 million compared to Swan Hunter's £210.6 million. The Times also suggested that the subsidy was as little as £10 million. In anticipation of the report, the Financial Times described the different philosophies adopted by the two bidders; while Swan Hunter viewed the ship as entirely military, "VSEL thought the design was basically a merchant ship with military hardware bolted on." VSEL's decision to sub-contract the build phase took advantage of lower overheads at a civilian yard as well as efficiency drives by its parent, Kværner.

Launched on 11 October 1995, she was subsequently named at Barrow by Queen Elizabeth II on 20 February 1998, prior to delivery to Devonport. In her sea trial, she reached a maximum speed of 20.6 knots (38.2 km/h; 23.7 mph); however, her usual top speed is 18 knots (33 km/h; 21 mph).

== Role ==
Ocean was designed to provide the amphibious assault capabilities last offered by Albion and Bulwark. She can deploy an Embarked Military Force (EMF) of a Royal Marines Commando Group from 3 Commando Brigade supported by aircraft and landing craft. The ship's company included 9 Assault Squadron (9 ASRM) from 1 Assault Group Royal Marines whose primary role is as an Amphibious Assault Squadron. Secondary tasks include boarding parties, beach reconnaissance and providing amphibious knowledge to the ships Command. Besides these roles they have responsibilities within the ship which include firefighting, watchkeeping and security. 9 ASRM is divided into a HQ unit, Landing Craft Troop, Signals detachment, Vehicle Deck Party and Assault Supply Team.

HMS Ocean was also capable of limited anti-submarine warfare activities, supporting afloat training and acting as a base facility for other embarked forces including counter-terrorism units.

The ship was capable of carrying four to six Westland Apache AH1 helicopters operated by the Army Air Corps, as well as helicopters of the Fleet Air Arm (Seaking Mk4) and Royal Air Force, including the larger twin-rotor Boeing Chinook transports. Prior to their retirement, Ocean could transport up to fifteen fixed-wing Harrier V/STOL aircraft of Joint Force Harrier in the ferry role, but was unable to operate as a fixed-wing aircraft carrier because she lacked the ski jump that is needed to launch a fully loaded Harrier.

For the 2012 London Olympics, she carried four Army Air Corps and four Fleet Air Arm Westland Super Lynx helicopters, to deploy special forces and conduct other missions in a security role.

Four Landing Craft Vehicle and Personnel (LCVPs) were permanently embarked and manned by 9 Assault Squadron Royal Marines.

== Operational history ==
=== 1998–2000 ===
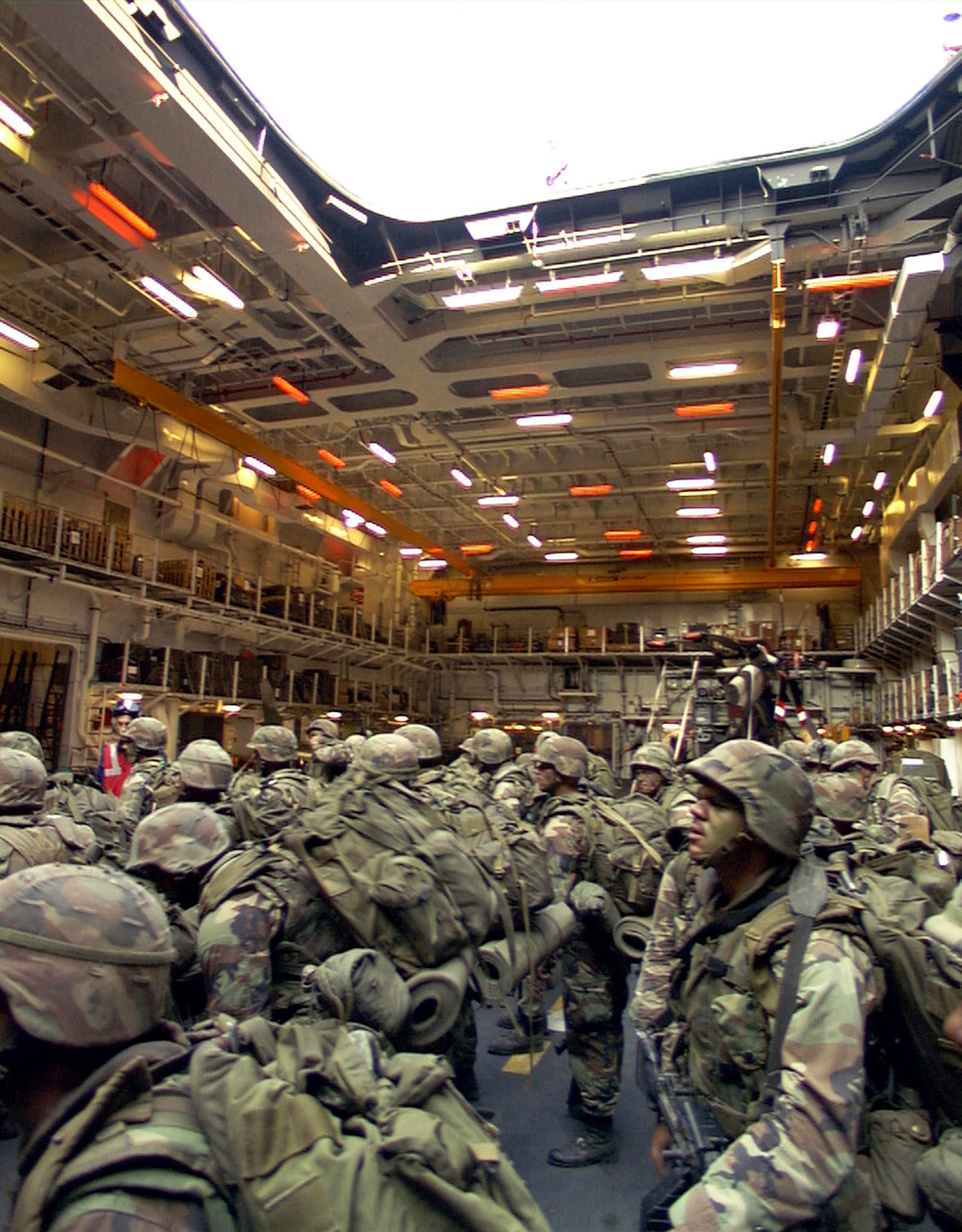
US Marines ride the forward aircraft lift into Ocean's hangar deck during an exercise in 1999.

Weeks after being commissioned, Ocean was undertaking the warm water element of her first-of-class trials, when she was deployed on short notice to the coasts of Honduras and Nicaragua to provide humanitarian assistance in the aftermath of Hurricane Mitch. In early 1999, Ocean was scheduled to take part in an exercise in the Atlantic, but was diverted to the Mediterranean in readiness for possible deployment to Kosovo.

During 2000, Ocean supported Operation Palliser in Sierra Leone, joining Illustrious in aiding the suppression of rebel activity with her own embarked force, and providing support facilities for the Spearhead battalion ashore.

=== 2001–2010 ===
On 17 February 2002, whilst under command of Captain Adrian Johns, a unit of Royal Marines from Ocean accidentally landed on the San Felipe beach in the Spanish town of La Linea instead of Gibraltar, causing a minor diplomatic incident as various media outlets labelled the mistake as an "invasion".

Ocean was the flagship and spearpoint of a large Royal Navy task force deployed for Operation Telic, the UK contribution to the 2003 Iraq War, for which she was awarded a new battle honour "Al Faw 2003". In the helicopter assault role she was accompanied by Ark Royal.

She was awarded the Freedom of the City of Sunderland on 26 July 2004.

In the summer of 2006, under the command of Captain Christopher Clayton, the ship was deployed as part of the task force involved in the Aurora exercises on the eastern seaboard of the United States. Clayton was later succeeded by Captain Tony Johnstone-Burt.

In 2007, Ocean began her first long refit period. This was carried out by Devonport Management Limited at their Devonport Royal Dockyard facility and lasted around 12 months. Following this major period of maintenance and upgrading work, Ocean sailed from Plymouth on Wednesday 24 September 2008 to start sea trials. As part of that upgrade, a PyTEC pyrolysising waste recycling unit was fitted.

On 18 February 2009, Ocean sailed from Devonport as part of the Taurus 09 deployment. She was joined on this deployment by the landing platform dock Bulwark, as the flagship of the group, which included Type 23 Frigates Argyll and Somerset and four ships of the Royal Fleet Auxiliary. This exercise was filmed for the second series of the Channel 5 documentary Warship. In June 2009, Ocean took part in exercise Bersama Shield with HMS Somerset and RFA Wave Ruler off the Malay Peninsula.

During the air travel disruption after the 2010 Eyjafjallajökull eruption, Prime Minister Gordon Brown assigned Ocean and other units to rescue stranded travellers and army personnel across the English Channel in Operation Cunningham.

In 2010, the ship was sent on a multi-purpose deployment. This started with exercise Auriga on the eastern coast of the US. She then moved to Brazil to conduct an exercise with the Brazilian marines; whilst there a defence co-operation agreement was signed on board. She then crossed the Atlantic to Nigeria to participate in the "Nigeria at 50" presidential fleet review and provide training to the Nigerian navy as part of the African partnership programme. She returned to Devonport in November.

=== 2011–2018 ===
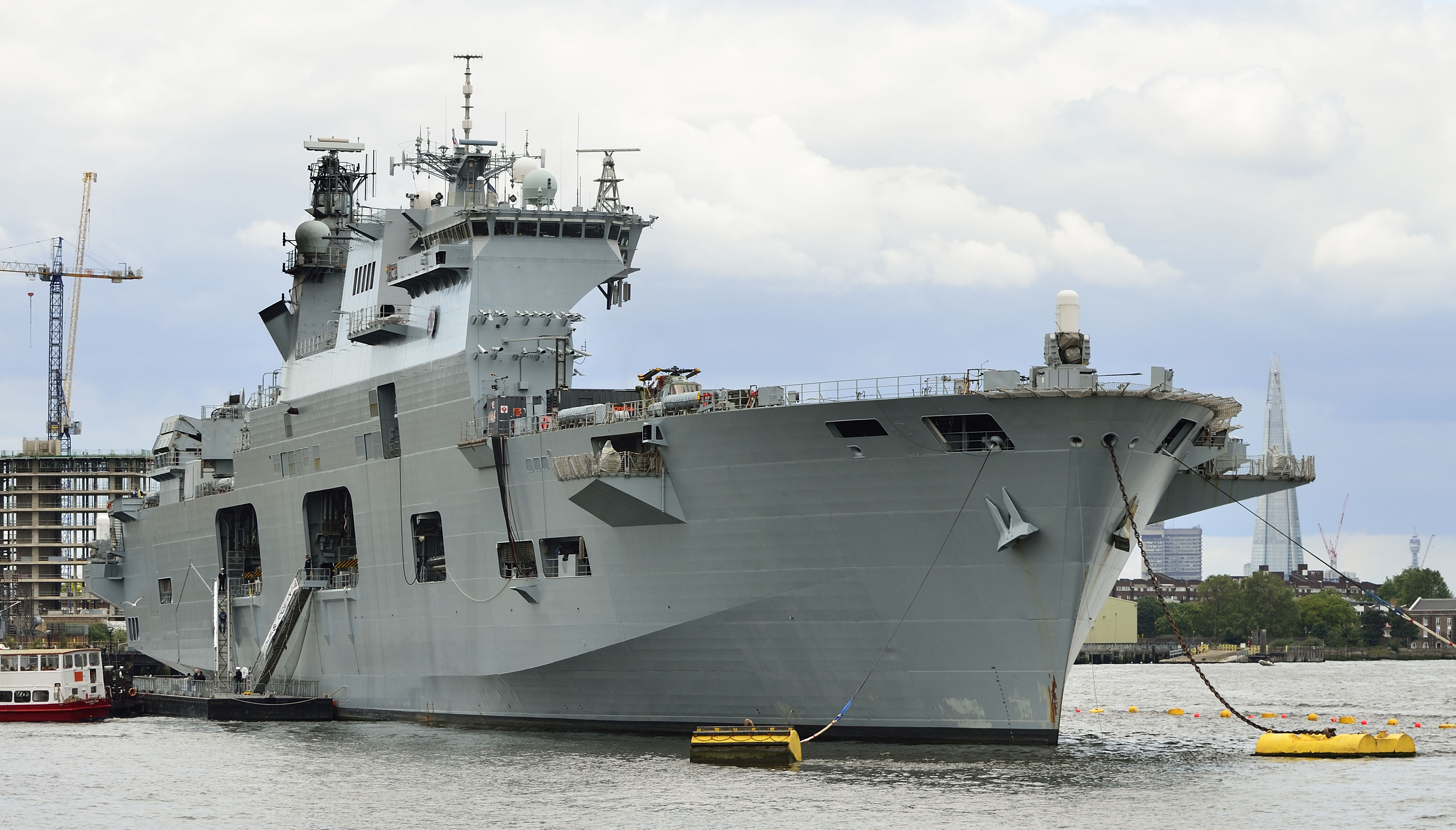
HMS Ocean deployed for the 2012 Olympic Games

In April 2011, while under command of Captain Keith Blount, the ship took part in the COUGAR 11 deployment under the ultimate command of Commander Amphibious Task Group (CATG). During this deployment, she took part in Exercise Cypriot Lion.

In May 2011, she was detached from CATG's COUGAR 11 deployment and sent with embarked Apaches to aid operations in Libya along with the attack helicopters aboard the French amphibious assault ship Tonnerre (L9014). This was the first time that Apache helicopters were sent directly into action from a Royal Navy ship. Her initial complement of three Apaches was bolstered by a fourth soon after, and later a fifth. The deployment included a large medical team, a sign of the ship's flexibility.

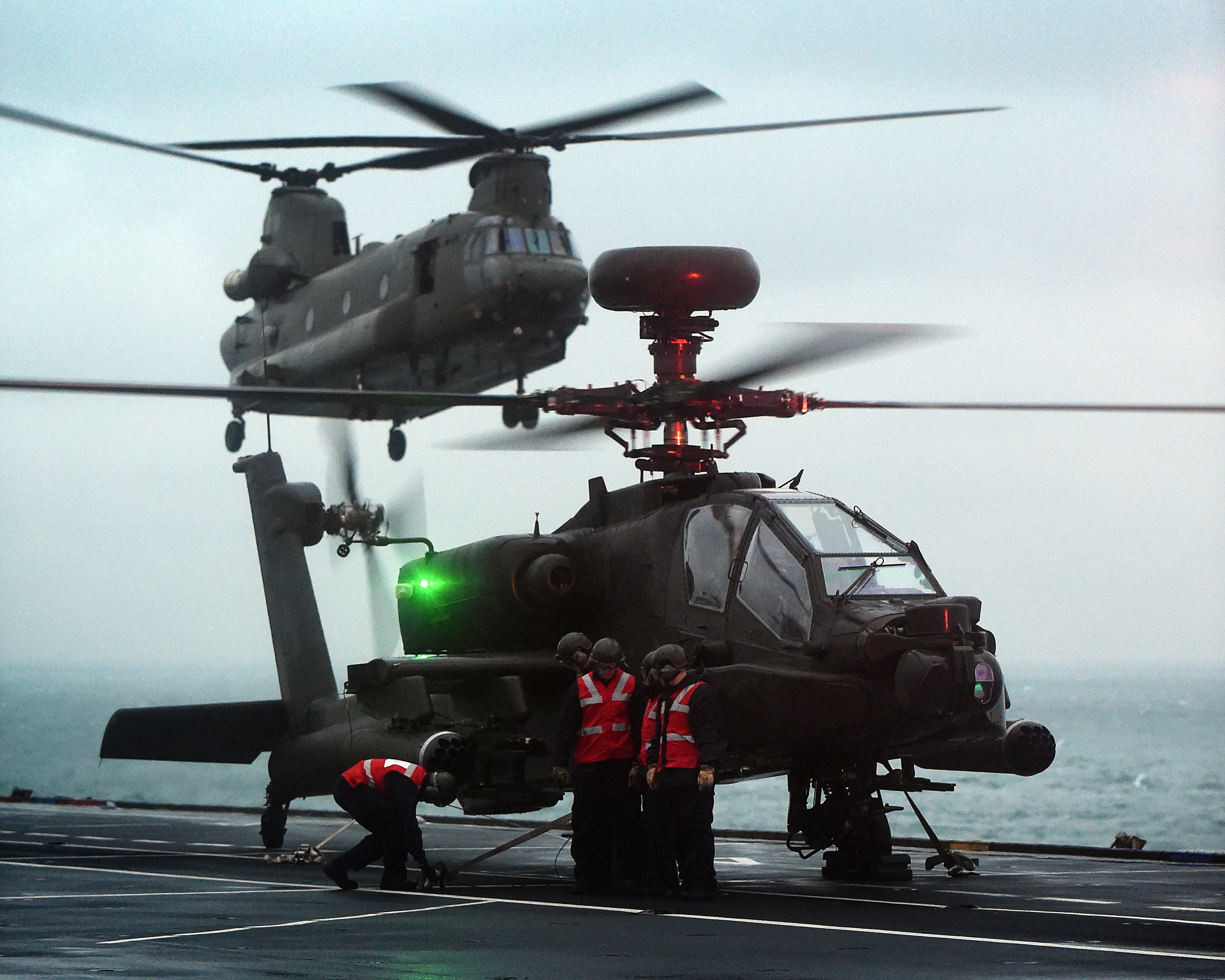
Apache and Chinook training on Ocean in November 2014 following her refit

On 4 May 2012, she moored at Greenwich to prepare for her role of providing logistics support, accommodation and a helicopter landing site during the London 2012 Olympic Games. From 24 to 28 May 2012, she visited Sunderland, her affiliated port, and made other port calls before returning to London on 13 July. After Olympic duty, Ocean returned to her home port of HMNB Devonport for a scheduled period of maintenance. The LPH role was provided by HMS Illustrious until 2014. On 22 July 2014, Ocean took over the helicopter carrier role again, after her 15-month, £65 million refit, replacing Illustrious, which then returned to her home port Portsmouth for the last time, being decommissioned on 28 August 2014. As part of the Response Force Task Group COUGAR 14 deployment, Ocean participated in exercises off Albania and France.

In April 2015 Ocean took part in Exercise Joint Warrior 15-1 around the coast of Scotland, with Wildcat helicopters landing on her for the first time. She then stopped again in Sunderland where the ship's company exercised their right to the freedom of the city, with more than 300 officers and ratings parading through the city centre.

Ocean became the Royal Navy Fleet Flagship in June 2015. In December 2015, she returned to port after Exercise COUGAR 15, an amphibious warfare exercise in the Mediterranean with the French Navy.

In September 2016, Ocean left Devonport for the inaugural Joint Expeditionary Force (Maritime) (JEF(M)) Task Group deployment which is the successor to the annual Cougar deployments. The bulk of this deployment took place East of Suez and demonstrated the UK's ongoing ability to deploy highly effective and combat capable maritime forces anywhere in the world. The core task group included the LSD RFA Mounts Bay (L3008), MOD strategic Ro-Ro vessel MV Eddystone and HMS Bulwark (L15). Elements of the Royal Marines 42 Commando, were spread across the force. Frigates and Destroyers from the Royal Navy and French Navy joined throughout the deployment. On the 60th anniversary of Operation Musketeer, Ocean became the flagship of COMATG. This marked the end of the JEF(M) deployment.

On 25 November, the ship rendezvoused with USS Dwight D. Eisenhower (CVN-69). COMATG assumed command of the U.S. Task Force 50, becoming Commander, Task Force 50 (CTF 50). Due to the U.S. Navy gap in carrier coverage in the Middle East, this was the first time a Royal Navy vessel had commanded the U.S. formation responsible for maritime war fighting in the Persian Gulf, Red Sea, Gulfs of Aden and Oman and the Indian Ocean. On 24 March Ocean returned to Devonport. During the deployment she steamed 23,000 miles, visited 11 countries, provided a platform for six British ambassadors and High Commissioners and was home to up to 1150 service personnel.

At the end of August 2017, Ocean left Devonport for her final deployment, scheduled to take over as Standing NATO Maritime Group 2 flagship in the Mediterranean. Before she could relieve HMS Duncan (D37) with SNMG2, Ocean was redeployed to assist in disaster relief efforts following Hurricane Irma in the Caribbean, and then the subsequent Hurricane Maria.

Ocean was decommissioned on 27 March 2018 at HMNB Devonport, with Queen Elizabeth II attending the ceremony.

== Sale to Brazil ==
Brazil, seeking a replacement for their navy's outgoing flagship, NAe São Paulo, began negotiations with the United Kingdom in 2017 to purchase Ocean for £84.3 million (312 million Brazilian Reais), following her decommissioning in 2018. An agreement was struck and, after being transferred to Brazil, the former HMS Ocean was commissioned as Atlântico in June 2018. She has since been the flagship of the Brazilian Navy.

Initially being designated with the initials PHM (Porta Helicópteros Multipropósito, Multipurpose Helicopter Carrier), the ship's designation was changed to NAM (Navio Aeródromo Multipropósito, Multipurpose Aircraft Carrier) on 12 November 2020 due to her ability to host UAVs and VTOL aircraft.

== Affiliations ==
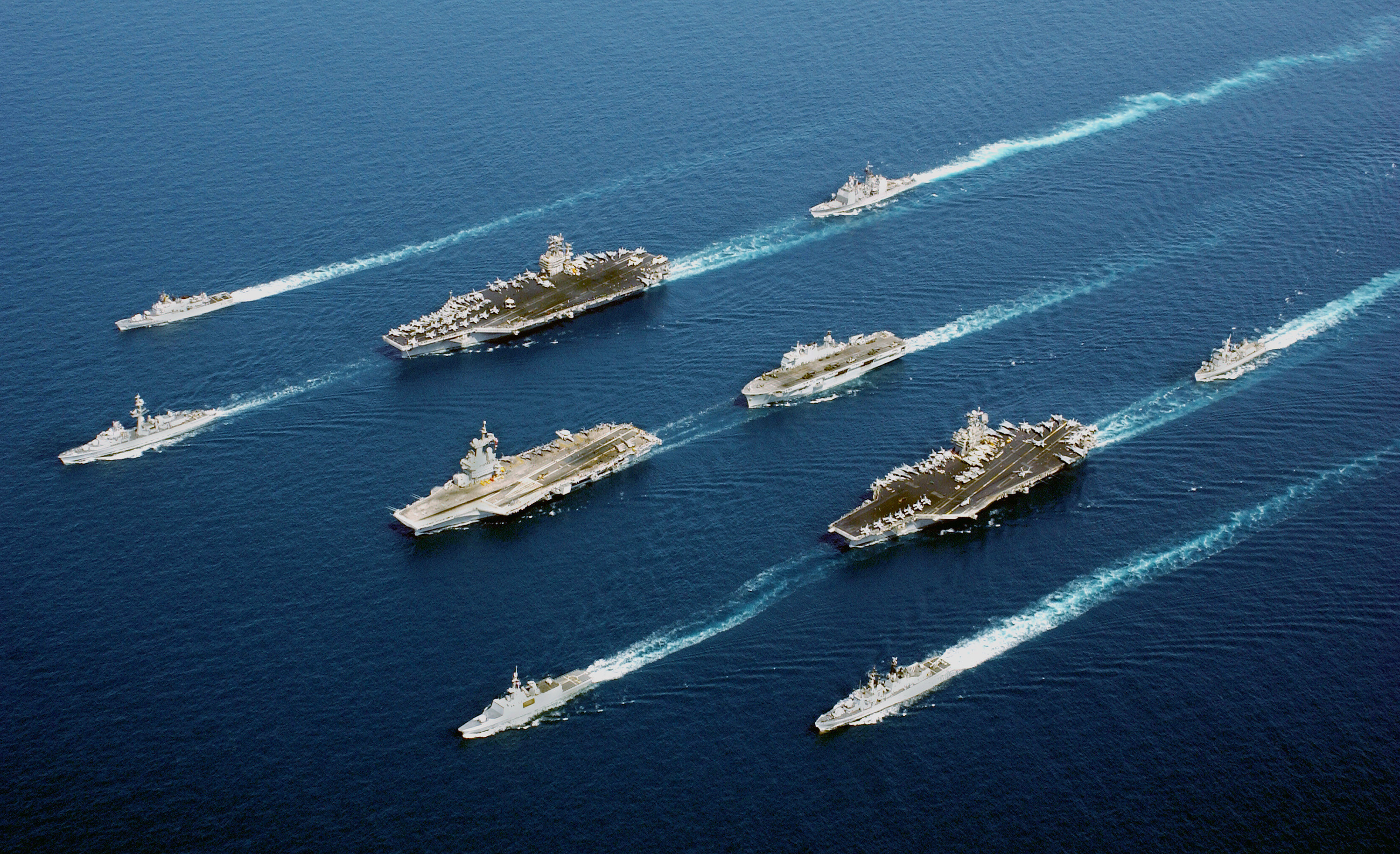
HMS Ocean (the smaller carrier at centre right) in a five-country multinational fleet, during Operation Enduring Freedom in the Oman Sea

- Coldstream Guards
- No. 27 Squadron RAF
- No. 30 Squadron RAF
- 656 Squadron, Army Air Corps
- 657 Squadron, Army Air Corps
- Worshipful Company of Farriers
- City of Sunderland
- Bedford Modern School CCF
- Whitgift School
- The Britannia Association
- HMS Ocean Association
- Duke of York Military School
- Kings College Wimbledon CCF
- Training Ship King Alfred
- Merton Sea Cadet Corps- T.S. Trafalgar
- 11th Torbay Sea Scouts
- 6th Torbay Sea Scouts

== See also ==
- Amphibious warfare ship
- List of amphibious warfare ships of the Royal Navy
