= Taurus 09 =

2009 Royal Navy deployment

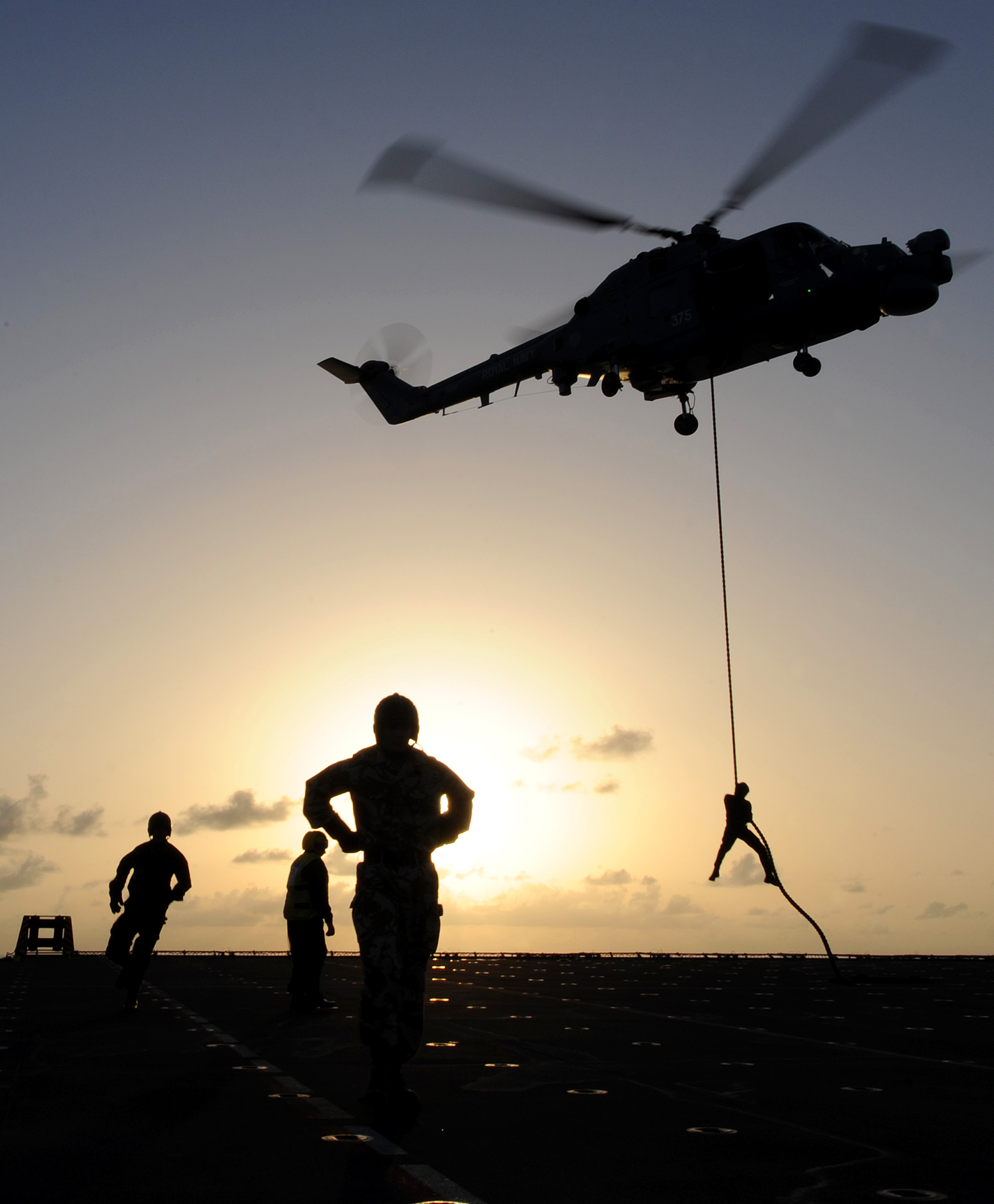
Royal Marines practise rapid roping from a Lynx helicopter onto the deck of Bulwark at sea in the Indian Ocean, 16 April 2009.

Taurus 09 was a Royal Navy deployment in 2009. It was the largest for more than ten years, involving a maximum strength of 3,300 Royal Navy personnel working from seven Royal Navy vessels and four Royal Fleet Auxiliary vessels. One ship each from the US and French navies also accompanied the deployment.

The task group departed Britain in February and called at Cyprus where elements took part in Operation Cyprus Wader, practising beach landings. In April the task group participated in Exercise Egemen, a NATO amphibious training operation in Turkey, alongside Turkish, Dutch and Belgian personnel. A reduced task group proceeded East of Suez, where underwater warfare exercises were carried out in the Arabian Sea. Elements took part in exercises in Bangladesh, marking the first time the Royal Navy had trained with that nation's navy for ten years. Royal Marines from the task group then took part in jungle warfare training in Brunei. The deployment ended in August when the last British vessels returned to Devonport.

== Background ==
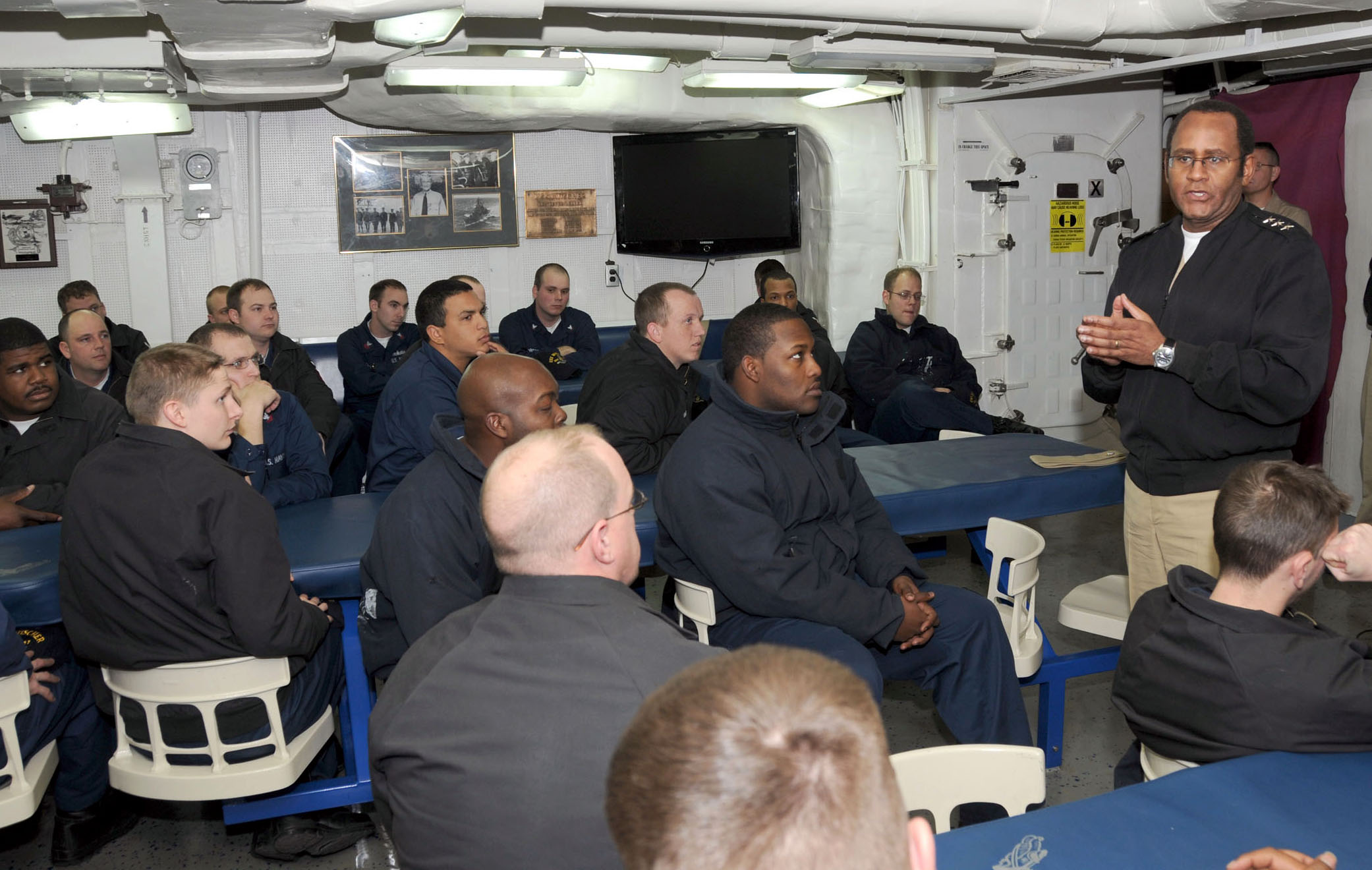
Vice Admiral Mel Williams speaks with members of the crew of USS Mitscher on 26 January 2009, the day before her deployment to Taurus 09.

Taurus 09 was the largest Royal Navy deployment for more than ten years. It centred on the Amphibious Task Group and was intended as a demonstration of the significant expansion of amphibious warfare capability in the navy since the end of the Cold War. It was also intended to refresh the traditional sea-fighting capability of the Royal Marines at a time when many were deployed on land operations in Iraq and Afghanistan. Another goal was to develop the Royal Navy's capability of working alongside NATO allies and forces from other nations and to demonstrate the UK's commitment to security in the Mediterranean region.

The deployment included the Royal Navy vessels Bulwark (assault ship), Ocean (landing platform helicopter), Argyll and Somerset (frigates), Echo (survey ship) and Trafalgar and Talent (fleet submarines). It also included the Royal Fleet Auxiliary vessels Mounts Bay and Lyme Bay (landing ships dock), Wave Ruler (tanker) and Fort Austin (stores ship). The US Navy's destroyer Mitscher and the French Navy's frigate Dupleix also participated. Personnel deployed included 40 Commando and 539 Raiding Squadron of the Royal Marines and the Fleet Diving Unit. Aerial assets came from 857 Naval Air Squadron (Sea King helicopters fitted for airborne surveillance and control), 820 Naval Air Squadron (AgustaWestland AW101 Merlin helicopters), the Commando Helicopter Force and No. 18 Squadron RAF (Chinook helicopters). Before the deployment some units took part in amphibious warfare training in Cornwall as part of Exercise South-West Sword. The Commander Amphibious Task Group at the start of the deployment was Commodore Peter Hudson.

== Mediterranean portion ==
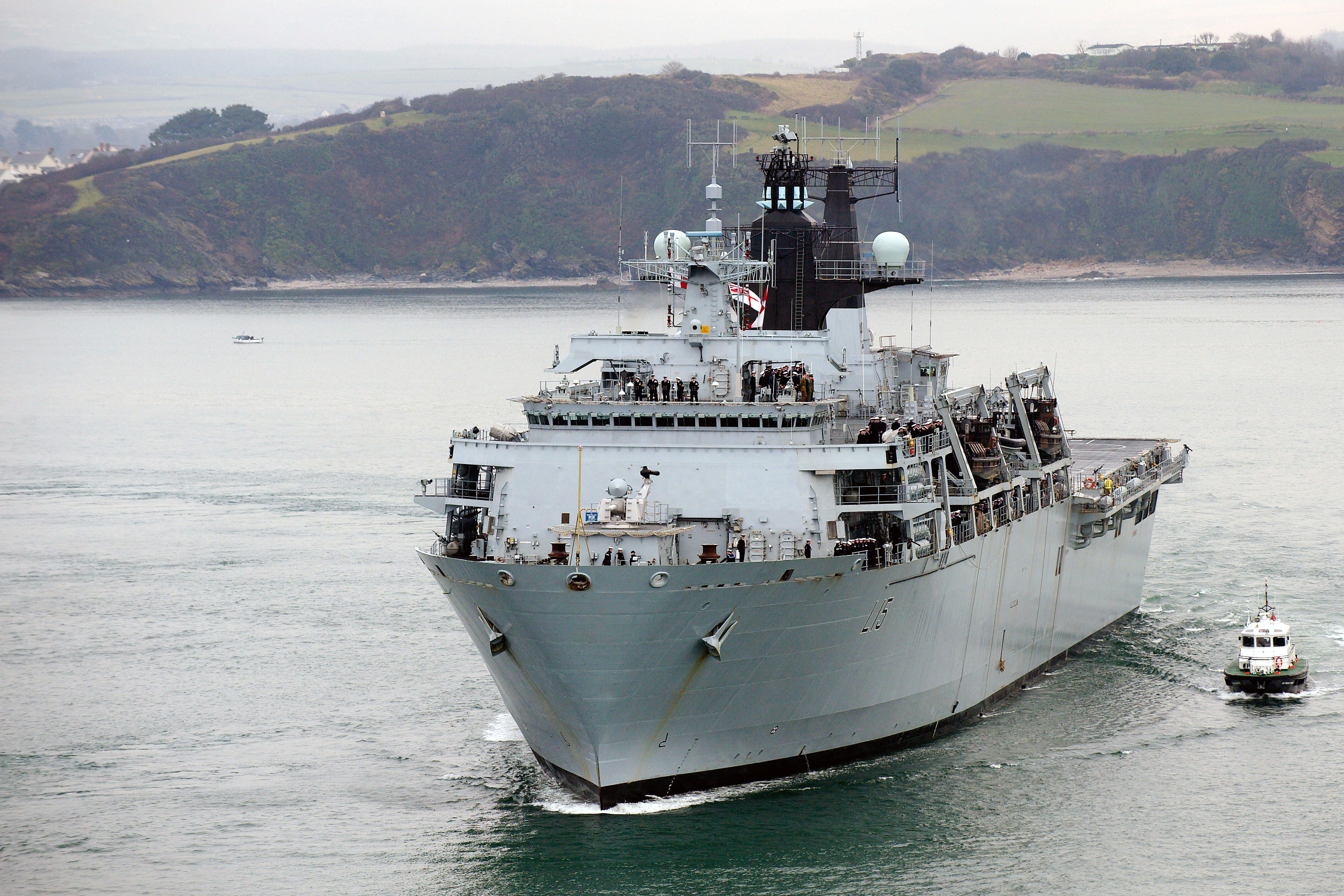
Bulwark departing Devonport for the deployment, 18 February 2009

Ocean deployed for Taurus 09 on 18 February, leaving her role as the high-readiness helicopter carrier in British waters. She carried 40 Commando and the naval elements of the helicopter force. From 27 February 2009 elements of the deployment, including Bulwark, Argyll, Somerset and Dupleix visited Malta. In March Bulwark and Ocean, with 40 Commando, participated in Operation Cyprus Wader, practising beach landings in Cyprus.

In April the ships of Taurus 09 took part in Exercise Egemen, a NATO amphibious training operation in Turkey. Egemen included operations alongside US troops as well as Dutch and Belgian troops operating from the Dutch landing platform docks Johan de Witt and Rotterdam. Turkish personnel operated on reconnaissance tasks from HMS Argyll. The Royal Marines were deployed ashore from Ocean, Mounts Bay and Lyme Bay and operated for five days of simulated assaults and resupply operations alongside their Dutch and Belgian allies. The exercise was commanded from Bulwark. The exercise included deployment of Offshore Raiding Craft by 539 Assault Squadron, including two of the then new gunboat variants. The 847 Naval Air Squadron and the Fleet Diving Unit also participated in the exercise, which involved 2,500 Royal Navy personnel.

== Far East portion ==
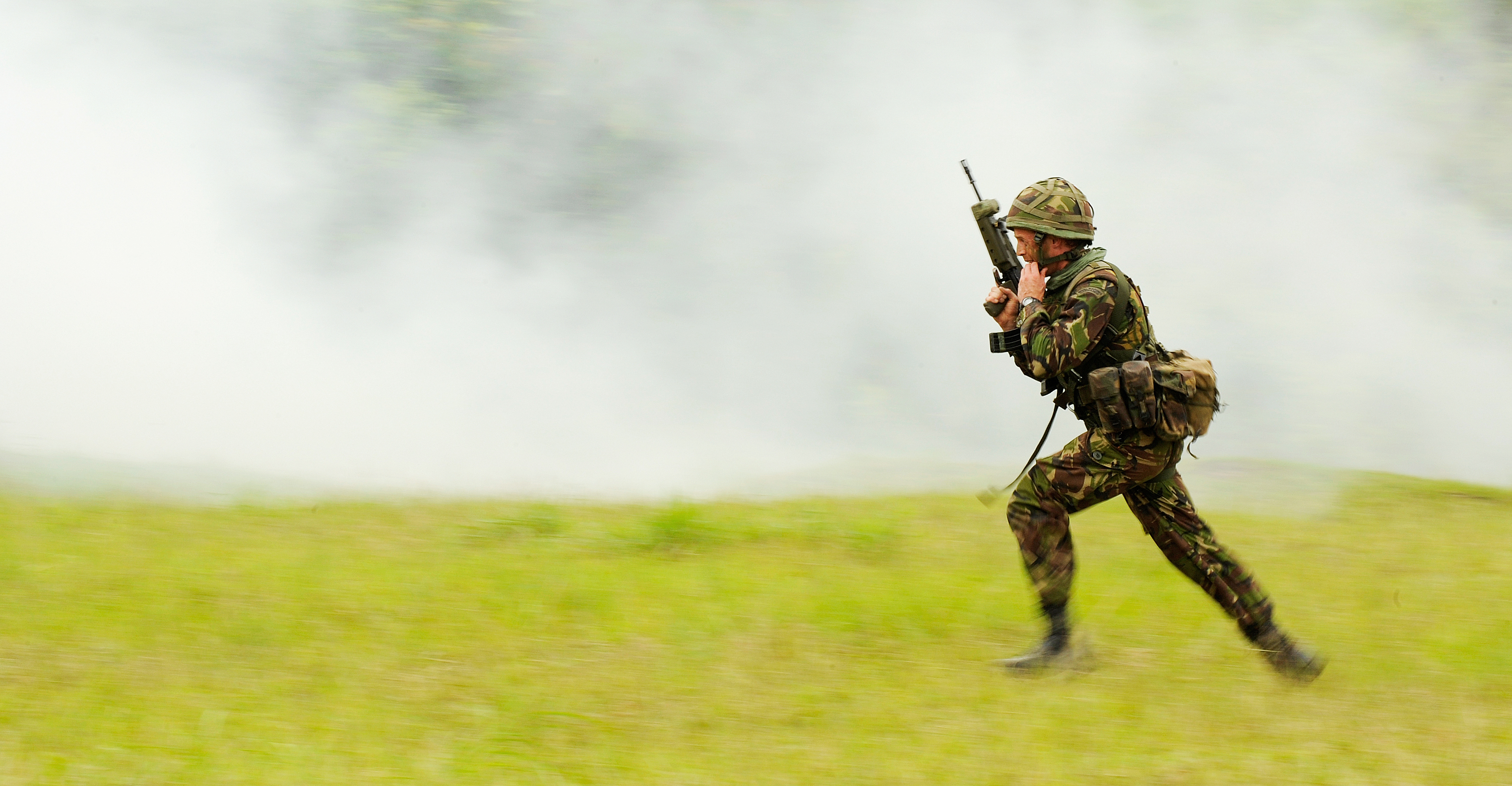
A Royal Marine of 40 Commando training in Malaysia during the deployment, 18 May 2009

The taskforce reduced in number for the second phase of the deployment which was to be East of Suez. After traversing the Suez Canal a group of vessels, including Ocean, Somerset, Talent, Wave Ruler and Mitscher successfully transited the Gulf of Aden between Yemen and Somalia, scene of recent pirate activity. During this transit Somerset assisted the Yemen coastguard in intelligence gathering using her Lynx helicopter.

Bulwark called at India while the rest of the group carried out underwater warfare exercises in the Arabian Sea. Somerset and its Merlin helicopters hunted for Talent using a number of Thales sonar systems including a 2087 surface-ship towed-array sonar, the 2076 submarine sonar, the FLASH helicopter dipping sonar, and the 2050 bow-mounted active sonar. Taurus 09 also carried out a trial of Raytheon's Deep Siren Tactical Paging system designed to communicate with submerged submarines at distances in excess of 100 nautical miles (190 km; 120 mi). The taskforce successfully communicated tactical messages and contact data to the submarine.

A portion of the task group, including eight Royal Navy and Royal Fleet Auxiliary vessels and two submarines, with Dupleix and Mitscher carried out training exercises with the Bangladesh Navy. This was the first time the Royal Navy had trained with the Bangladesh Navy for ten years. The exercises took place in a number of Bangladeshi rivers from 29 April and were known as Exercise Shomudro Torongo.

The task group transited the Strait of Malacca between Malaysia and Indonesia, scene of other pirate activity. Ocean attended the International Maritime Defence Exhibition in Singapore in May. The group took park in joint Five Power Defence Arrangements and Commonwealth of Nations Exercise Persma Shield off Malaysia in June with the Royal Marines taking part in survival exercises. Bulwark rejoined the task group for jungle training exercises in Brunei. These included survival exercises and practice in navigation and river crossings.

== Conclusion and legacy ==
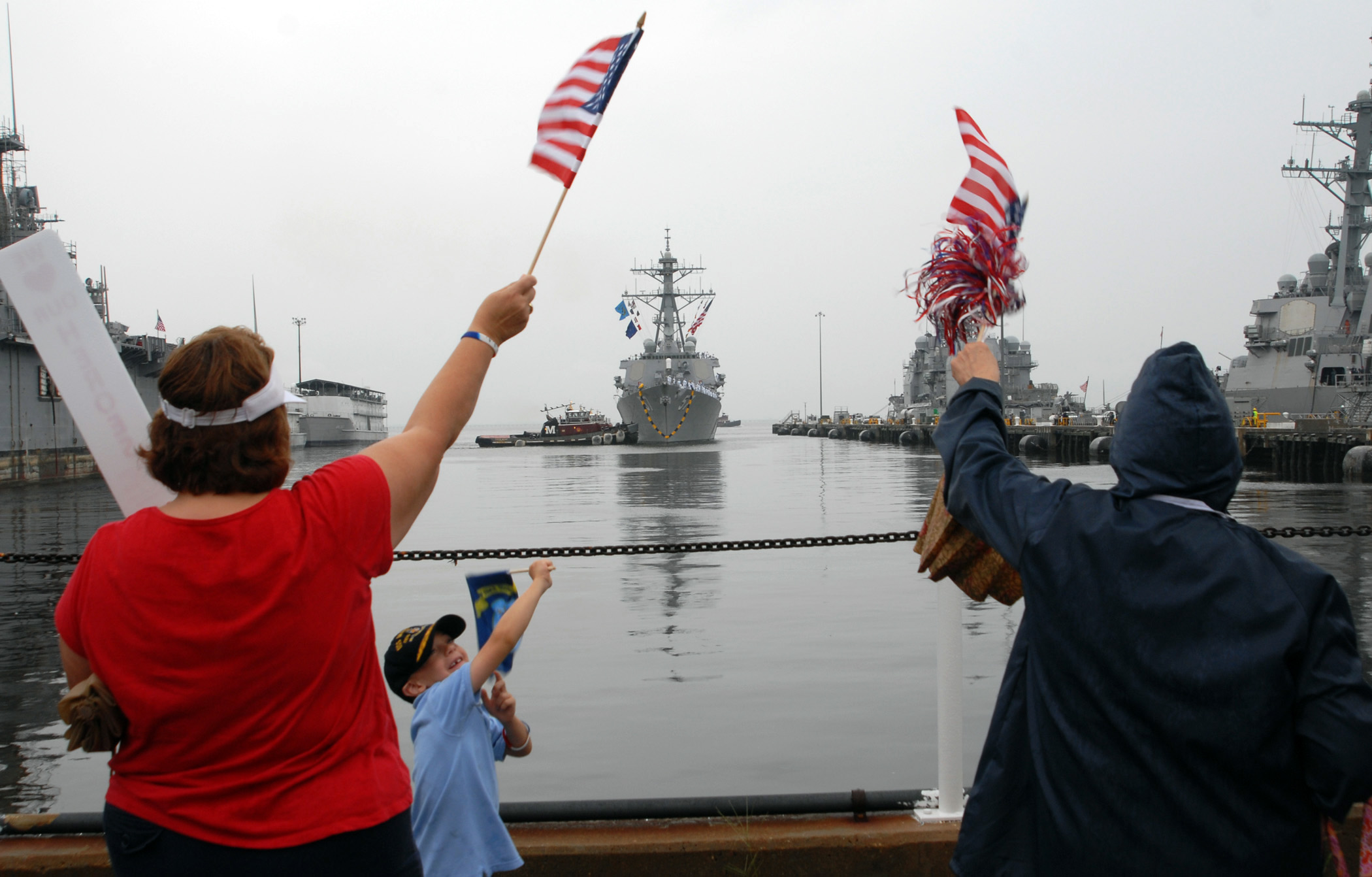
Mitscher returns to port at Norfolk naval base following the deployment, 14 August 2009.

The task group returned home after the Brunei exercises, which marked their furthest travel east (at 114 degrees longitude). During the return journey 81 members of the crew of Somerset rowed the length of the Suez Canal, in 2 kilometres (1.2 mi) legs, in a time of 10 hours and 40 minutes. On the return journey Wave Ruler visited Valletta, Malta from 16 July 2009 to carry out an operational stand down and changeover of crew. Wave Ruler was a particularly active member of the task group, providing fuel and other supplies on more than 100 occasions, and travelling 35,000 nautical miles (65,000 km; 40,000 mi); she returned to Devonport on 2 August 2009. The last British ships, Ocean, Somerset and Bulwark returned to Devonport in the UK on 3 August. The returning ships were greeted by thousands of spectators and welcomed to music by the Royal Marines Band Service. By the time of its return it was commanded by Commodore Paul Bennett who had succeeded Hudson in the role of Commander Amphibious Task Group.

The deployment covered 20,400 miles (32,800 km) and involved 3,300 Royal Navy personnel, at its maximum strength, training with 17 foreign nations. During the deployment the task group was visited by the serving First Sea Lord and Chief of the Naval Staff Sir Mark Stanhope and his predecessor Sir Jonathon Band. A Granada Television film crew also visited to film for series two of the Channel 5 series Warship.

In the years following the deployment the Royal Navy retired its aircraft carriers and for some years before the commissioning of HMS Queen Elizabeth (R08) in 2017 did not operate any. The Amphibious Task Group, renamed the Response Force Task Group became the primary deployable force of the navy.
