= HMS Somerset (F82) =

1996 Type 23 or Duke-class frigate of the Royal Navy

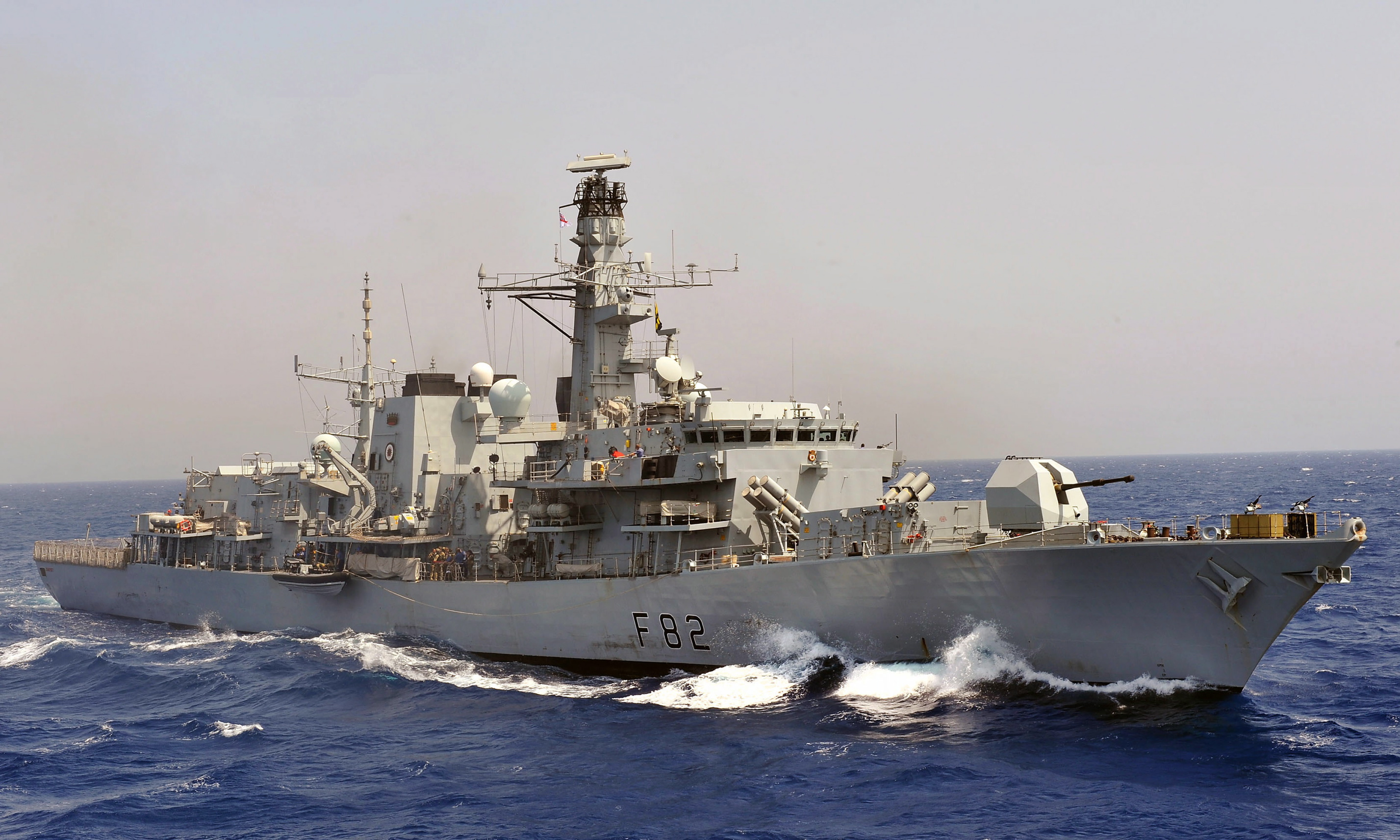
- HMS Somerset in Indian Ocean, 2011

History

United Kingdom
- Name: Somerset
- Namesake: Dukedom of Somerset
- Operator: Royal Navy
- Ordered: January 1992
- Builder: Yarrow Shipbuilders
- Laid down: 12 October 1992
- Launched: 25 June 1994
- Sponsored by: Lady Layard
- Commissioned: 20 September 1996
- Refit: Major 2012-2013, LIFEX 2019 onwards
- Home port: HMNB Devonport, Plymouth
- Identification: IMO number: 8949680; MMSI number: 234635000; International call sign: GDIP
- Motto: Foy pour Devoir; "Faith for Duty"
- Status: in active service
- Badge

General characteristics
- Class & type: Type 23 Frigate
- Displacement: 4,900 t (4,800 long tons; 5,400 short tons)
- Length: 133 m (436 ft 4 in)
- Beam: 16.1 m (52 ft 10 in)
- Draught: 7.3 m (23 ft 11 in)
- Propulsion: CODLAG: Four 1510 kW (2,025 shp) Paxman Valenta 12CM diesel generators; Two GEC electric motors delivering 2980kW (4000 shp); Two Rolls-Royce Spey SM1C delivering 23,190 kW (31,100 shp)
- Speed: In excess of 28 kn (52 km/h; 32 mph)
- Range: 7,500 nautical miles (14,000 km) at 15 kn (28 km/h)
- Complement: 185 (accommodation for up to 205)
- Electronic warfare & decoys: UAF-1 ESM, or, UAT Mod 1; Seagnat; Type 182 towed torpedo decoy; Surface Ship Torpedo Defence
- Armament: Anti-air missiles: 1 × 32-cell GWS 35 Vertical Launching System (VLS) for: 32 × Sea Ceptor missiles (1–25+ km); Anti-ship missiles: 2 × quad Naval Strike Missile; Anti-submarine torpedoes: 2 × twin 12.75 in (324 mm) Sting Ray torpedo tubes; Guns: 1 × BAE 4.5 inch Mk 8 naval gun; 2 × 30 mm DS30M Mk2 guns, or, 2 × 30 mm DS30B guns; 2 × Miniguns (retired 2023, replaced by Browing .50 calibre heavy machine guns); 4 × General-purpose machine gun
- Aircraft carried: 1 × Wildcat HMA2, armed with: 4 × Sea Venom anti-ship missiles (initial operating capability from October 2025; full operating capability projected from 2026), or, 2 × Sting Ray anti-submarine torpedoes, or; 20 × Martlet multirole missiles (from 2021); Mk 11 depth charges; or; 1 × Westland Merlin HM2, armed with; 4 × anti submarine torpedoes
- Aviation facilities: Flight deck; Enclosed hangar

HMS Somerset is a Type 23 frigate of the Royal Navy. She is the eleventh ship of the class to join the fleet since 1989. She was built by Yarrow Shipbuilders Ltd on the River Clyde, in Scotland and was launched in June 1994 by Lady Elspeth Layard, wife of then 2nd Sea Lord Admiral and Commander-in-Chief Naval Home Command Admiral Sir Michael Layard. She entered service in 1996. Lady Layard is the ship's sponsor. She is named after the Dukedom of Somerset.

The fourth Somerset to serve in the Royal Navy, she has inherited four battle honours from previous ships of the name; Vigo Bay (1702), Velez Malaga (1704), Louisburg (1758) and Quebec (1759). The previous ships all served during the 18th century and ensured that the name Somerset played a significant part in that period of naval history.

Somerset's home port is HMNB Devonport. The ship has the Freedom of the City of Wells and is also affiliated with the County of Somerset, the Worshipful Society of Apothecaries, the 2nd and 4th Battalions of The Rifles (inherited from affiliation with the Royal Green Jackets), TS Weston and TS Queen Elizabeth Sea Cadet Units, Downside, Baytree and Helles Schools, Bridgwater College and the Somerset Legion House of The Royal British Legion. The 19th Duke of Somerset takes a keen interest in the ship and is a regular visitor, and the ship also hosted Harry Patch, Simon Weston (in place of Johnson Beharry) and Marcus Trescothick whilst docked at Avonmouth for a remembrance service to launch the 2008 British Legion Poppy Appeal.

She is the first British warship to be fitted with, and to live fire, the Naval Strike Missile.

HMS Somerset was used in the James Bond film, Tomorrow Never Dies, as the fictional HMS Devonshire, named after the neighbouring British county to Somerset.

== Operational history ==
=== 1996–2000 ===
On 2 November 1999, Somerset returned briefly to Sierra Leone to stand by for a possible evacuation of British nationals during a breakdown in the peace talks, though after several days of the talks resumed and Somerset was withdrawn.

=== 2001–2010 ===
In 2007, the first at-sea firing trials of the UK Royal Navy's new 30mm DS30M Mark 2 Automated Small Calibre Gun system were completed by Somerset.

On 18 February 2009, Somerset sailed from Devonport as part of the Taurus 09 deployment under Commander UK Amphibious Task Group, Commodore Peter Hudson. She was joined on this deployment by landing platform dock Bulwark as Hudson's flagship, landing platform helicopter Ocean, Type 23 frigate Argyll and four ships of the Royal Fleet Auxiliary. In June 2009, she took part in exercise Bersama Shield with Ocean and RFA Wave Ruler off the Malay Peninsula.

In May 2010 she sailed for Operation Telic, conducting boarding operations and oil platform protection operations in the Persian Gulf.

=== 2011–2021 ===
On 3 May 2012, she began a refit at the Devonport Royal Dockyard operated by the Babcock International Group. The refit was expected to take nine months. She took part in Exercise Joint Warrior 2013. In January 2015, Somerset took part in the search for the crew of the Cyprus-registered cement carrier Cemfjord, which had capsized in the Pentland Firth.

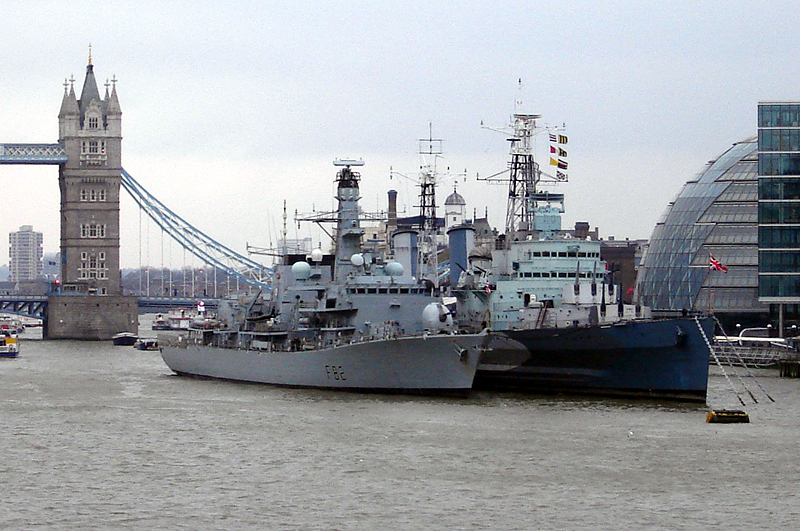
Somerset moored alongside the World War II cruiser Belfast on the Thames in London

On 23 April 2015, with the Border Force cutter Valiant, she intercepted the Tanzanian-registered tug Hamal in the North Sea about 100 miles (160 km) off Aberdeen, leading to the seizure of more than three tons of cocaine, believed to be at the time the single largest seizure of a Class A drug in the UK. In Autumn 2015, she carried out security patrols in support of the European Heads of Government meeting in Malta. In November 2015, Somerset visited Valencia - the first Royal Navy ship to do so in a number of years. While there, she met a delegation led by Juan Carlos Valderrama Zurián, the Central Government Representative for the Valencia region, and hosted a lunch to thank representatives of various Armed Forces charities for their work. In December 2015, she returned to port after performing guard duties at the 2015 CHOGM.

In March 2016, as the Russian destroyer Vice-Admiral Kulakov, a tanker and a tug entered the United Kingdom's exclusive economic zone, they were intercepted and escorted by Somerset. Somerset was again tasked with escorting a Russian vessel in May 2017 when she monitored the Kilo-class submarine Krasnodar as it transited the English Channel. Somerset was awarded the 'Fleet Frigate Effectiveness Trophy' for 2017. A Royal Navy press release said; "HMS Somerset has been awarded the accolade for being the most successful and versatile of all of the Royal Navy’s frigates, which are widely considered to be the workhorses of the fleet."

Somerset began a major upgrade in November 2018 and officially returned to service in March 2022.

=== 2022–present ===
In August 2022, it was reported that the ship had suffered a "major systems failure" and had to be docked in Rosyth for investigation and potential repair. However, pursuant to repairs, the frigate was then reported to have returned to sea later the same evening. In total, Somerset spent 52 days at sea that year.

In January 2023, work began on installing Naval Strike Missiles (NSM) on Somerset to replace the Harpoon anti-ship missiles. Somerset was to be the first Royal Navy ship to be fitted with Naval Strike Missiles and the removal of the obsolete Harpoon racks and blast deflectors was completed in January 2023. However, reported "persistent defects" in the ship since she emerged from refit in 2022 forced her back into dry dock on three occasions. As of September 2023, she was again in dry dock with the planned fitting of NSM and the testing of other key systems delayed. The ship was reported to have returned to sea in October. In December, HMS Somerset became the first Royal Navy warship to go to sea with NSM. She reportedly suffered a further breakdown in February 2024 delaying both her return to active operations as well as the testing of NSM for deployment with the Royal Navy. In September 2024, it was reported that the ship's post-refit defects had been "finally resolved" and that in July she had returned to sea for a series of trials.

On 22 January 2025, the UK Defence Secretary, John Healey, announced that Somerset had been deployed to monitor Russian undersea reconnaissance ship Yantar following her passing through British waters in the North Sea. In September 2025, Somerset conducted the Royal Navy's first live firing of an NSM at the Andøya test range off the Norwegian coast, during Exercise Aegir 25.

== Affiliations ==
- Duchy of Somerset
- The Rifles
- Wells, Somerset
- Worshipful Society of Apothecaries
- Somerset County Council
- Downside School CCF, Somerset
- URNU Bristol
