= Warship (2010 TV series) =

- Genre: Documentary / Reality
- Starring: Royal Navy personnel
- Country of origin: United Kingdom
- No. of seasons: 2
- No. of episodes: 12

Production
- Production locations: HMS Illustrious; HMS Bulwark; HMS Ocean
- Running time: Approx. 46 min per episode

Original release
- Network: Channel 5
- Release: 22 October – 8 November 2010

Related
- Warship

Warship is a British documentary series produced by Channel 5 about the Royal Navy. The series features two Navy ships and documents the daily routines of the crew on board during a deployment or exercise. The first series focused on the lives of the crew on board the aircraft carrier HMS Illustrious. The second series was filmed on the amphibious warfare ships HMS Bulwark and HMS Ocean during a six-month exercise in 2009.

== Episodes ==
Twelve episodes of the series aired:

=== Series 1 (2010) ===
No. overall	No. in season	Title	Original release date
1	1	"Episode 1"	22 October 2010
HMS Illustrious is due to depart HMNB Portsmouth on an exercise but her departure is hampered by some problems.
2	2	"Episode 2"	25 October 2010
The sailors on Illustrious are subjected to a "battle-readiness" inspection. After much hassle, Illustrious finally sets sail.
3	3	"Episode 3"	26 October 2010
Illustrious navigates the treacherous Suez Canal. Meanwhile, a sailor goes missing.
4	4	"Episode 4"	27 October 2010
The crew hosts a dinner for naval royalty. The awesome Harrier jump jets arrive and love is in the air.
5	5	"Episode 5"	29 October 2010
The ship has reach the Indian Ocean and the resident RAF pilots practice landing on the ship's flight deck.
6	6	"Episode 6"	27 October 2010
Illustrious has reached the easternmost point of its journey. They are joined by a nuclear submarine in the exercise.

=== Series 2 (2010) ===
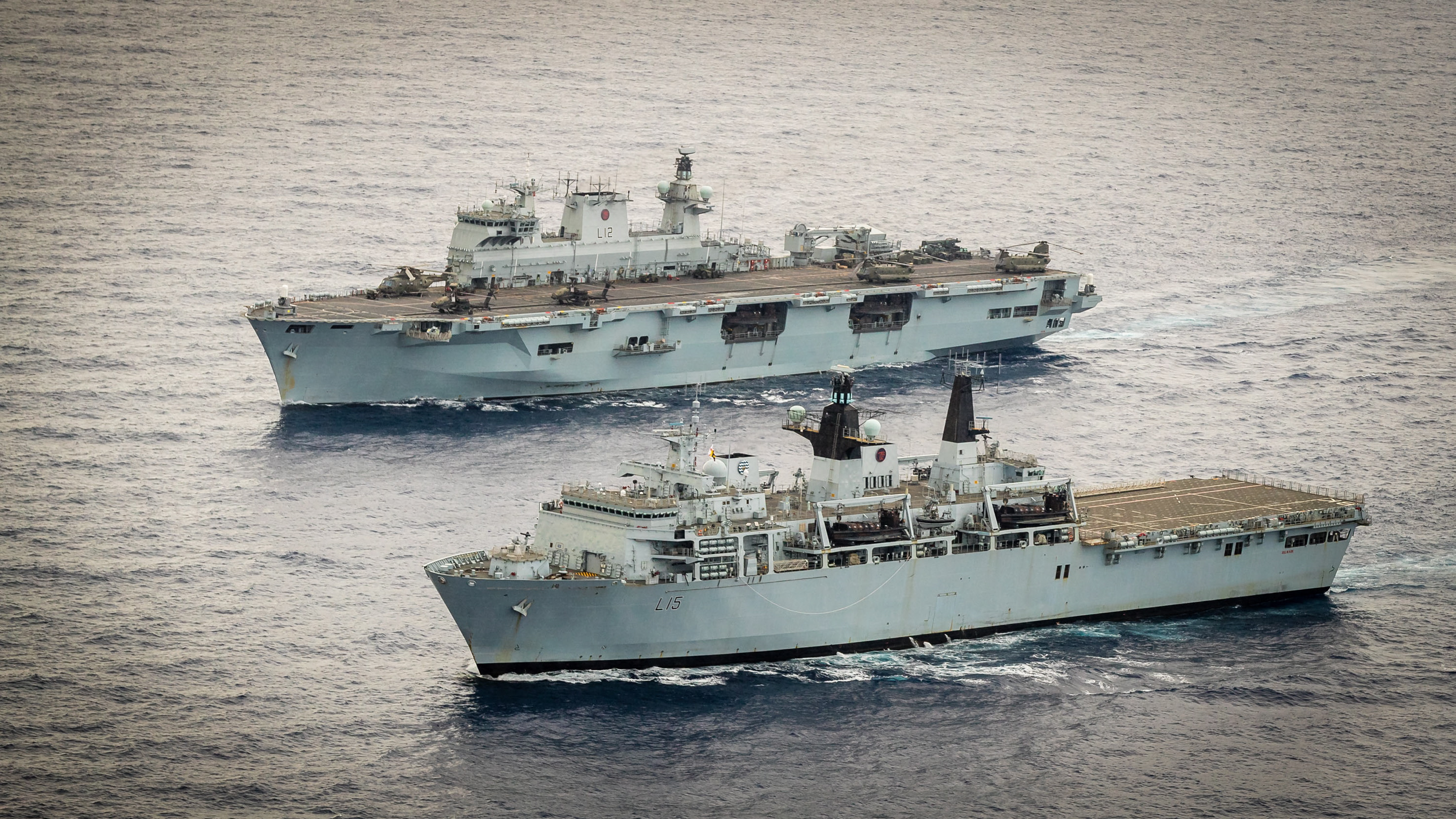
HMS Bulwark and HMS Ocean

No. overall	No. in season	Title	Original release date
7	1	"Episode 7"	1 November 2010
HMS Bulwark and her 300-strong crew depart HMNB Devonport for the Far East via the Bay of Bengal for exercise Taurus 09 Task Force.
8	2	"Episode 8"	2 November 2010
The Marines try to cope with the hostile conditions while training in the jungles of Malaysia.
9	3	"Episode 9"	3 November 2010
HMS Ocean takes over Bulwark as flagship of the deployment and are joined by fellow warships and sailors from the United States, France and other allies.
10	4	"Episode 10"	4 November 2010
Ocean joins an international fleet of warships for a simulated air-to-sea battle.
11	5	"Episode 11"	5 November 2010
Ocean leads the exercise task force through the South China Sea to Brunei as 500 Marines prepare for jungle training.
12	6	"Episode 12"	6 November 2010
Marines from the assault squadrons launch a training exercise in the steamy jungles of Brunei. They are joined by their American counterparts in team-building exercises.
