= PyTEC =

PyTEC is a containerised Pyrolysis Waste Disposal System designs by QinetiQ and used in various military applications. The system converts waste products to thermal energy which can be used for energy generation. The system was developed by Compact Power Ltd specifically for QinetiQ. The system was first fitted to HMS Ocean and is currently under evaluation for the US Army.
