= RFA Mounts Bay =

2006 Bay-class dock landing ship of the Royal Fleet Auxiliary

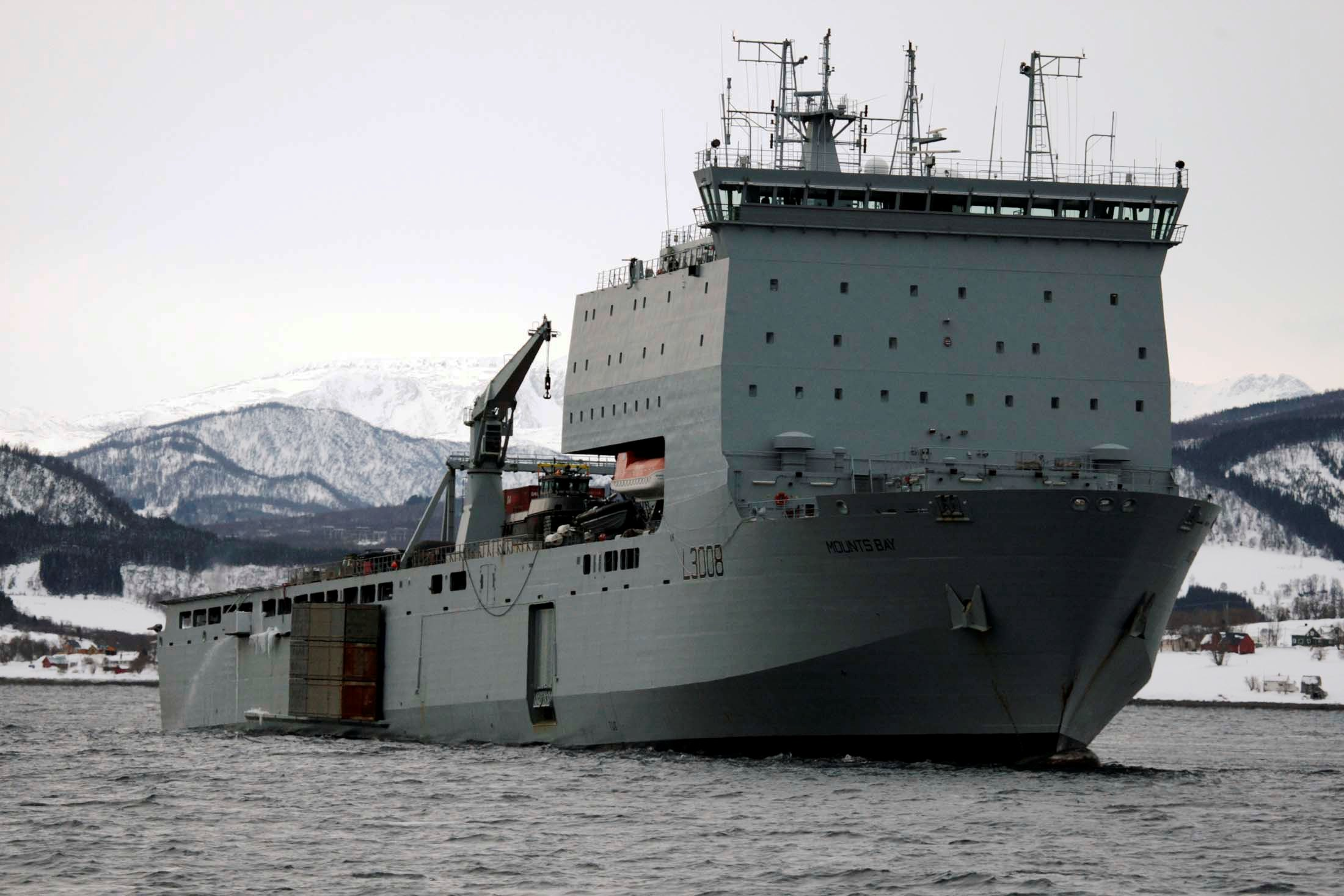

History

United Kingdom
- Name: RFA Mounts Bay
- Namesake: Mount's Bay
- Ordered: 19 November 2001
- Builder: BAE Systems, Govan, Glasgow
- Laid down: 25 August 2002
- Launched: 9 April 2004
- In service: 13 July 2006
- Home port: Falmouth
- Identification: Pennant: L3008; IMO number: 9240770; MMSI number: 232697000; International call sign: GCIC; Deck code: MB
- Status: Ship in active service
- Badge

General characteristics
- Class & type: Bay-class landing ship dock
- Displacement: 16,160 t (15,905 long tons) full load
- Length: 579.4 ft (176.6 m)
- Beam: 86.6 ft (26.4 m)
- Draught: 19 ft (5.8 m)
- Propulsion: 2 × Wärtsilä 8L26 generators, 6,000 hp (4.5 MW); 2 × Wärtsilä 12V26 generators, 9,000 hp (6.7 MW); 2 × propulsion pods; 1 × bow thruster
- Speed: 18 knots (33 km/h; 21 mph)
- Range: 8,000 nmi (15,000 km; 9,200 mi) at 15 kn (28 km/h; 17 mph)
- Boats & landing craft carried: 1 LCU or 2 LCVP in well deck; Mexeflote powered rafts
- Capacity: 1,150 linear metres of vehicles (up to 24 Challenger 2 tanks or 150 light trucks); Cargo capacity of 200 tons ammunition or 24 TEU containers
- Troops: 356 standard, 700 overload
- Complement: 60
- Armament: Fitted to receive: 2 × DS30B Mk 1 30 mm guns; 2 × Phalanx CIWS; 2 × 7.62mm Mk.44 Miniguns (may be replaced by Browning .50 caliber heavy machine guns as of 2023); 6 × 7.62mm L7 GPMGs
- Aviation facilities: Flight deck can operate helicopters up to Chinook size

RFA Mounts Bay is a Bay-class auxiliary landing ship dock (LSD(A)) of the Royal Fleet Auxiliary. She is named after Mount's Bay in Cornwall. As of 2024, Mounts Bay is the principal vessel assigned to the Royal Navy's Littoral Response Group (North).

== Design and construction ==
The Bay class was designed as a replacement for the Round Table-class logistics ships operated by the RFA. The new design was based on the Royal Schelde Enforcer design; a joint project between the Dutch and Spanish resulting in the Rotterdam-class and Galicia-class amphibious warfare ships. The main difference with the British ships is the lack of a helicopter hangar. The ships were originally designated "Auxiliary Landing Ship Logistics" or ALSL, but this was changed in 2002 to "Landing Ship Dock (Auxiliary)" or LSD(A), better reflecting their operational role. Four ships were ordered; two from Swan Hunter, and two from BAE Systems Naval Ships.

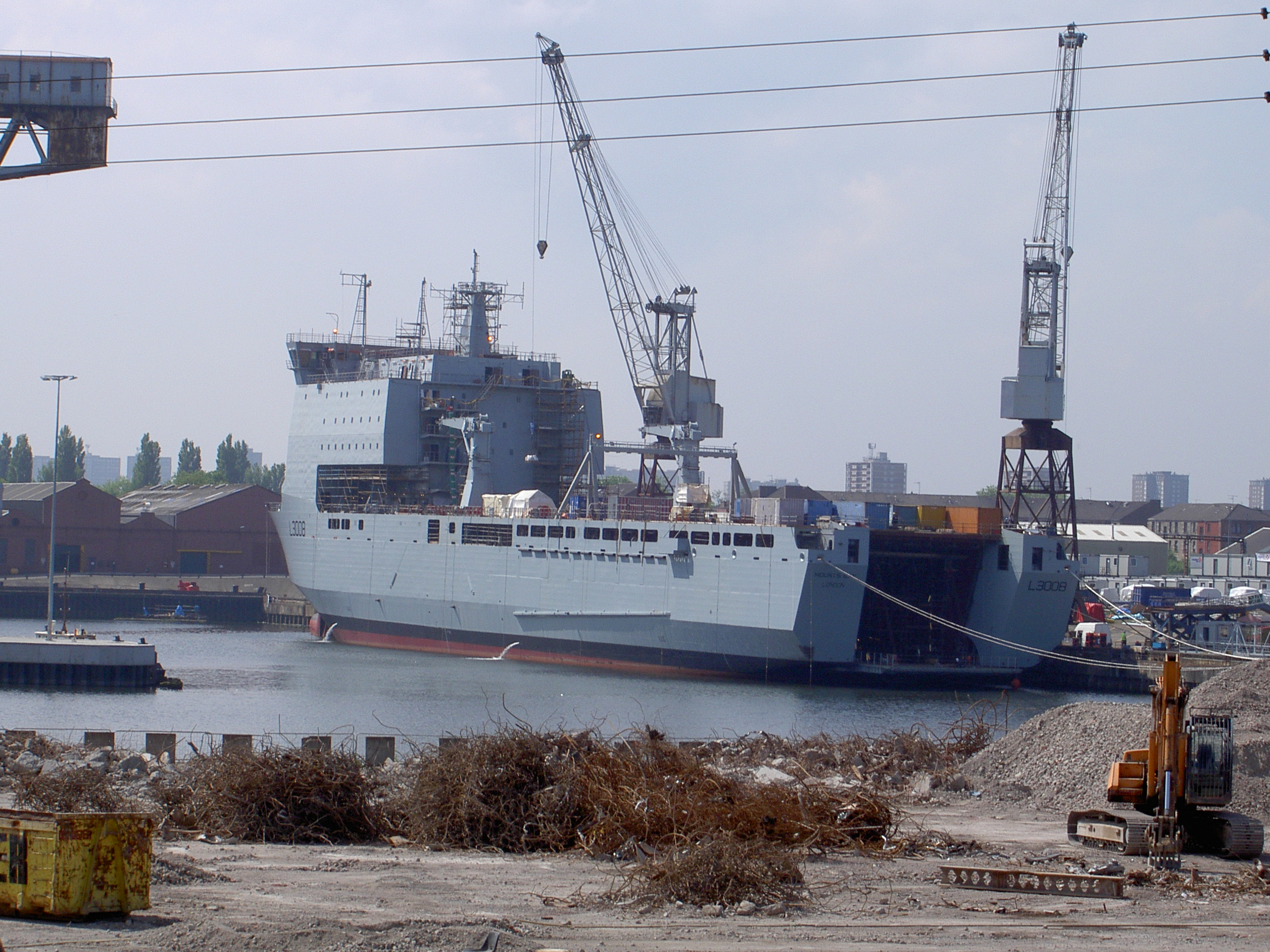
Mounts Bay under construction in June 2004

The Bay-class ships have a full load displacement of 16,160 tonnes (15,900 long tons). Each is 579.4 feet (176.6 m) long, with a beam of 86.6 feet (26.4 m), and a draught of 19 feet (5.8 m). Propulsion power is provided by two Wärtsilä 8L26 generators, providing 6,000 horsepower (4.5 MW), and two Wärtsilä 12V26 generators, providing 9,000 horsepower (6.7 MW). These are used to drive two steerable propulsion pods, with a bow thruster supplementing. Maximum speed is 18 knots (33 km/h; 21 mph), and the Bay-class ships can achieve a range of 8,000 nautical miles (15,000 km; 9,200 mi) at 15 knots (28 km/h; 17 mph). Mounts Bay is normally unarmed, but is fitted to receive two 30 mm DS30B cannons, two Mk.44 miniguns, six 7.62mm L7 GPMGs, and a Phalanx CIWS. The standard ship's company consists of 60 officers and sailors.

As a sealift ship, Mounts Bay is capable of carrying up to 24 Challenger 2 tanks or 150 light trucks in 1,150 linear metres of space. The cargo capacity is equivalent of 200 tons of ammunition, or 24 Twenty-foot equivalent unit containers. During normal conditions, a Bay-class ship can carry 356 soldiers, but this can be almost doubled to 700 in overload conditions. Helicopters are not routinely carried on board, but a temporary hangar can be fitted and the flight deck is capable of handling helicopters up to the size of Chinooks, as well as Merlin helicopters and Osprey tiltrotor aircraft. The well dock can carry one LCU Mark 10 or two LCVPs, and two Mexeflotes can be suspended from the ship's flanks. Two 30-ton cranes are fitted between the superstructure and the flight deck.

Mounts Bay and sister ship Cardigan Bay were ordered from BAE on 19 November 2001. Mounts Bay was laid down at BAE's shipyard at Govan, Scotland on 25 August 2002. She was launched on 9 April 2004, although it took several attempts to christen the ship, and she received damage after becoming entangled in chains and 25-ton weights during the actual launching. Mounts Bay was dedicated on 13 July 2006, the first Bay-class ship to enter service with the RFA. The launching of the ship was included in the film On a Clear Day (2005).

== Operational history ==
Mounts Bay took part in the 2006 Vela Deployment. The deployment lasted from 11 September until 22 November 2006. In total approximately 3,000 British personnel and eleven ships of the Royal Navy and Royal Fleet Auxiliary were involved. This deployment saw for the first time, an Albion-class vessel, HMS Albion taking part in amphibious operations with a Bay class vessel. The deployment was divided into two phases, the first in local waters and the second in waters off the coast of Sierra Leone. For this deployment she was fitted with the Bowman communications system.

Mounts Bay demonstrated her lifting capability by transporting in excess of 130 vehicles, for the passage from the UK via Lisbon to Sierra Leone. After completing the Vela Deployment, she returned to the UK to load vehicles and equipment for Exercise Clockwork in northern Norway. She reached Sørreisa on 9 December. Sørreisa is within the Arctic Circle and is the furthest north any Bay-class vessel has been so far. After discharging her cargo, Mounts Bay returned to the UK, successfully completing operations from the Equator to the Arctic Circle in the last three months of 2006.

She attended the Dover Maritime Careers Festival on 23–24 March 2007, mooring at the Dover Western Docks. She was also in Fowey on 22 August 2008 for the regatta week. Mounts Bay was involved in Exercise Joint Warrior 2008, along with HMS Bulwark, which acted as the Fleets Amphibious Flagship. HMS Ark Royal and HMS Illustrious also took part in the two-week exercise off Scotland.

She attended The Tall Ships' Races event in Belfast Northern Ireland between 14 and 17 August 2009 which was the finishing line for the competition.

In April 2011, she was deployed as part of the Response Force Task Group's COUGAR'11 deployment.

In early 2012, she joined the aircraft carrier HMS Illustrious and fleet flagship HMS Bulwark to participate in Exercise ‘Joint Warrior’ and other training missions with warships from the United States, Norway and the Netherlands.

On Armed Forces Day 2012, 30 June, she fired the salute in Plymouth as she steamed past HMS Argyll, with the Earl of Wessex and the First Sea Lord on board.

Mounts Bay is scheduled to depart for Exercise COUGAR 2013, with Viking armoured vehicles on board.

In January 2016, she set sail for the Mediterranean, carrying the new Governor of Gibraltar, Ed Davis. She has further been deployed to the Aegean Sea to help NATO forces deal with the European migrant crisis. Mounts Bay docked at Gibraltar for one month of repairs.

On 19 May 2016 she was deployed to assist in the search for the missing EgyptAir flight MS804 in the Mediterranean between Crete and Egypt. By June 2016 she was tasked to the European Union's Operation Sophia to target Daesh gun and people traffickers.

After undertaking maintenance in Falmouth in March 2017, Mounts Bay deployed to the Caribbean to provide support during the 2017 hurricane season. She was tasked to assist in HADR operations at Anguilla, British Virgin Islands, and Turks and Caicos Islands in the aftermath of Hurricane Irma in September 2017 obtaining widespread media coverage.

In September 2019, Mounts Bay delivered essential supplies to the Bahamas in the wake of Hurricane Dorian.

In March 2022, Mounts Bay participated in Cold Response 2022, a multinational NATO military exercise in Norway occurring biennially.

In August 2024, Mounts Bay was reported to have deployed to the Mediterranean to replace RFA Cardigan Bay stationed there in the context of the Gaza war and which was returning to the U.K. for refit. In late 2024, Mounts Bay herself returned to the U.K. to undergo refit planned to start in January 2025. She was reported as laid-up in Falmouth due to "treasury constraints" as of 2025 but as of April 2026 was reported to be fully crewed and completing maintenance to permit her reactivation.
