= Royal Navy Fleet Flagship =

Lead command ship of the British Navy

In the Royal Navy, the fleet flagship is the warship designated as the fleet's most prestigious vessel, currently HMS Prince of Wales.

In the modern era, the fleet flagship has usually been an aircraft carrier, but that changed in 2010 with the assignment of HMS Albion. The flag was transferred to HMS Bulwark in 2011 and HMS Ocean in June 2015, then to HMS Albion in 2018. Finally, the flag reverted to an aircraft carrier when HMS Queen Elizabeth took up her position in January 2021. The position was rotated to HMS Prince of Wales on the 2 December 2024.

== Flagships in the Royal Navy ==
Technically, the fleet flagship would be the ship that would host the two-star maritime battlestaff headquarters (such as COMUKMARFOR, a Rear Admiral who normally is based ashore) for operations.

Generally, a flagship is a ship in which an Admiral (or a Commodore) flies his flag (or broad pennant). As, in the Royal Navy, shore establishments can be commissioned as warships, the term can also indicate that of shore establishments run by senior Royal Naval commanders. For example, in 1960, the Commanders-in-Chief of the Home Fleet and its successors the Western Fleet, and Commander-in-Chief Fleet, flew their flags ashore in HMS Warrior in Northwood, before the downgraded three-star Fleet Commander moved to Portsmouth in 2005. Since then the Fleet Commander has flown his flag from these headquarters at the shore establishment HMS Excellent. In addition, the First Sea Lord flies his flag in HMS Victory (permanently based at the National Museum of the Royal Navy, but still a commissioned warship), and she is thus referred to as the 'First Sea Lord's Flagship'.

== "National Flagship" ==
In 2021 the UK Government announced plans for a new "national flagship" crewed and run by the Royal Navy that despite this designation would not be a command ship but a replacement for the Royal Yacht Britannia. The plans were abandoned in November 2022.

== Historic flagships ==
| Ship | Dates |
|---|---|
| Elizabeth Bonaventure / Bonaventure | 1567–1626 |
| Ark Royal / Anne Royal | 1587–1636 |
| Naseby / HMS Royal Charles | 1655–1667 |
| HMS Iron Duke | 1914–1917 |
| HMS Queen Elizabeth | 1917–1919 |

== Modern fleet flagships ==
| Ship | Dates |
|---|---|
| HMS Invincible | 1993–2005 |
| HMS Ark Royal | 2005–2007 |
| HMS Illustrious | 2007–2009 |
| HMS Ark Royal | 2009 – 13 December 2010 |
| HMS Albion | 13 December 2010 – 11 October 2011 |
| HMS Bulwark | 11 October 2011 – 1 June 2015 |
| HMS Ocean | 1 June 2015 – 27 March 2018 |
| HMS Albion | 27 March 2018 – 27 January 2021 |
| HMS Queen Elizabeth | 27 January 2021 – 2 December 2024 |
| HMS Prince of Wales | 2 December 2024 – present |

== See also ==
- List of flagships
