= NDM Oiapoque =

2005 Albion-class landing platform dock of the Royal Navy

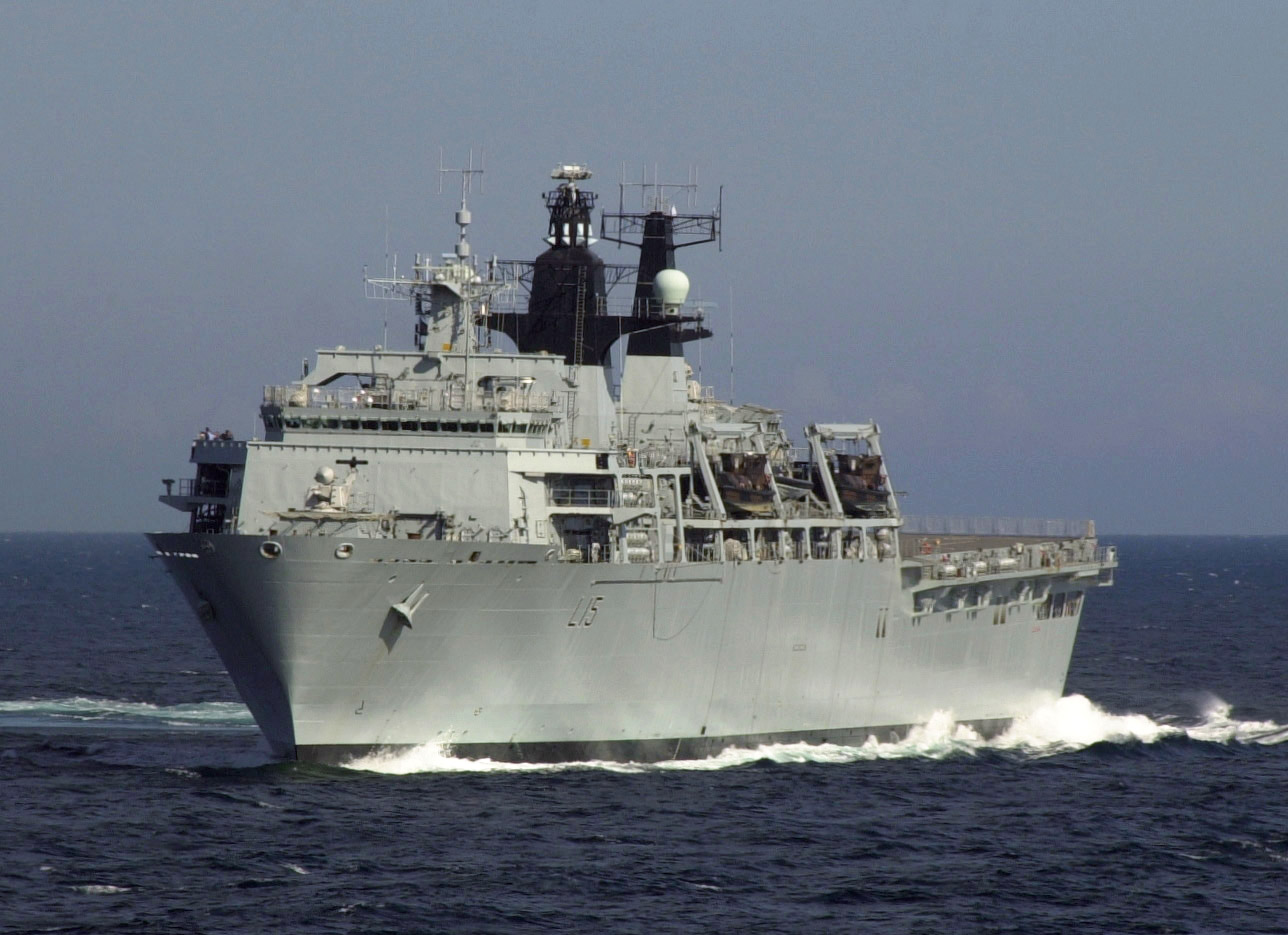
- HMS Bulwark

History

United Kingdom
- Name: Bulwark
- Ordered: 18 July 1996
- Builder: BAE Systems Marine, Barrow-in-Furness, England
- Laid down: 27 January 2000
- Launched: 15 November 2001
- Sponsored by: Lady Walker
- Commissioned: 28 April 2005
- Decommissioned: March 2025
- Refit: 2010–2011
- Home port: HMNB Devonport, Plymouth
- Identification: IMO number: 9160607; MMSI number: 232002833; Callsign: GDIV; Pennant L15; Deck code: BK
- Motto: "Under thy wings I will trust"
- Status: Sold to Brazil
- Badge

Brazil
- Name: Oiapoque
- Namesake: Oiapoque
- Acquired: 10 September 2025
- Commissioned: 2026 (planned)
- Identification: Pennant G350

General characteristics
- Class & type: Albion-class amphibious transport dock
- Displacement: 19,560 t (19,250 long tons; 21,560 short tons)
- Length: 176 m (577 ft 5 in)
- Beam: 28.9 m (94 ft 10 in)
- Draught: 7.1 m (23 ft 4 in)
- Propulsion: 2 × Wärtsilä Vasa 16V 32E diesel generators; 2 × Wärtsilä Vasa 4R 32E diesel generators; GE Power Conversion Full Electric Propulsion System, 2x Motors and Drives; Bow thruster
- Speed: 18 knots (21 mph; 33 km/h)
- Range: 8,000 miles (7,000 nmi; 13,000 km)
- Boats & landing craft carried: 4 × LCU MK10; 4 × LCVP MK5
- Capacity: 67 vehicles
- Troops: 405 Royal Marines (710 overload)
- Crew: 325
- Sensors & processing systems: 2 × Type 1007/8 I-band radars; 1 × Type 996 E/F band radar; 1 × Type 997 E/F-band radar (from 2016)
- Armament: 2 × 20mm Phalanx CIWS; 2 × 20mm GAM-BO1 cannon; 4 × general purpose machine guns; 4 x HMG
- Aviation facilities: Two landing spots for helicopters up to the size of a Chinook.

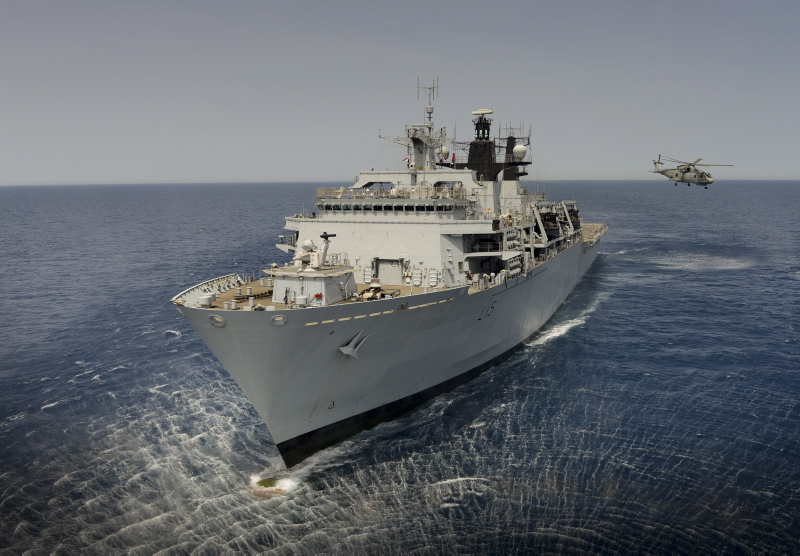
Migrant rescue duty in the Mediterranean Sea, August 2014

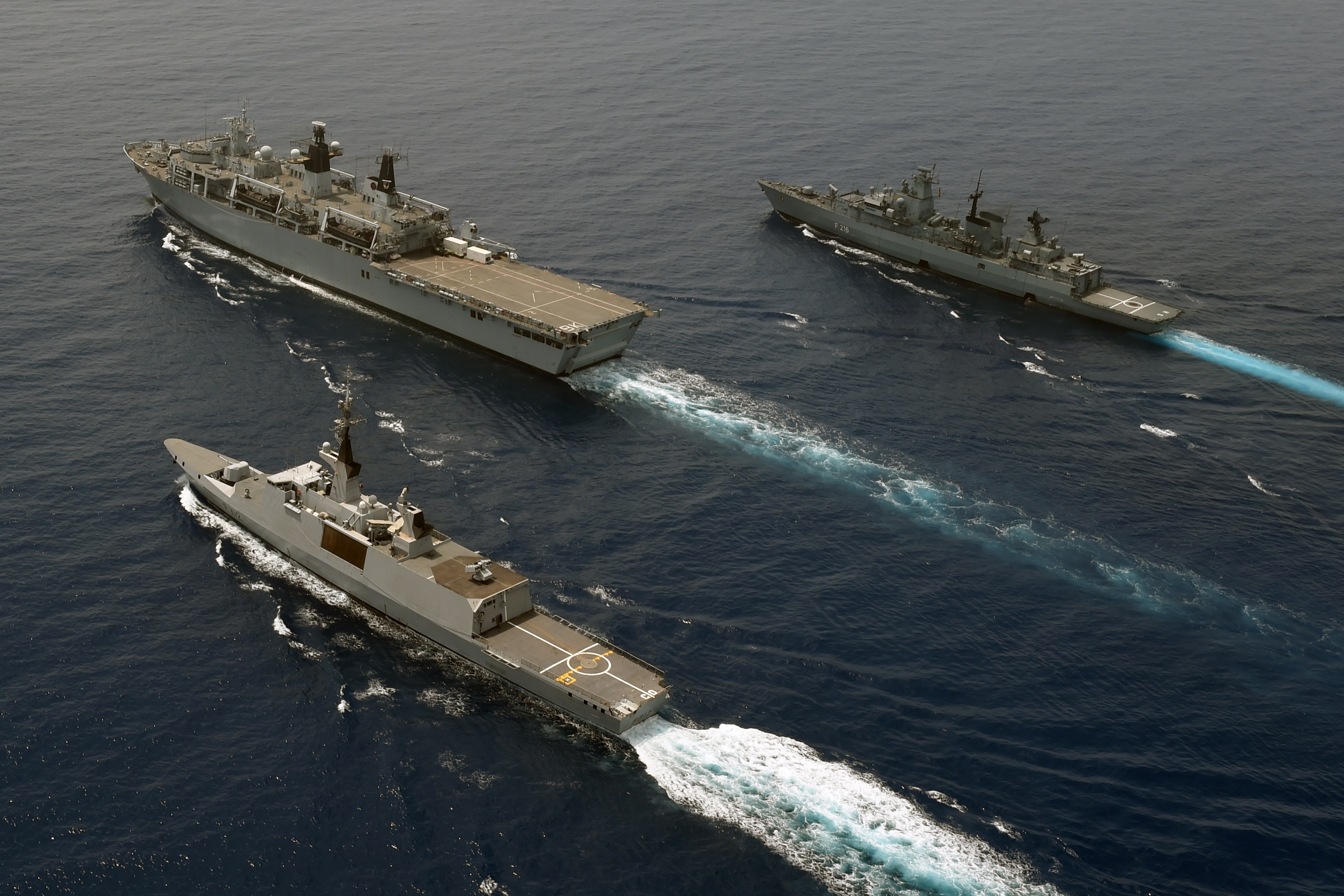
Escorted by the French frigate Courbet and German frigate Schleswig-Holstein during IMCMEX14 in the Persian Gulf

HMS Bulwark is the second unit of the Albion-class assault ships originally built for the Royal Navy. She was one of the United Kingdom's two landing platform docks designed to put Royal Marines ashore by air and by sea. She was retired as of March 2025.

Although launched in 2001, delays caused the delivery date to be put back, and the ship entered service on 28 April 2005. Together with Albion, and other amphibious ships, she has provided a larger and more effective amphibious capability than the previous Fearless-class vessels. Between October 2011 and June 2015 she was the fleet flagship of the Royal Navy. She has been in extended upkeep since 2020. The ship is designed to send large numbers of troops and vehicles to shore as quickly as possible. Bulwark has supported a permanently embarked Royal Marines landing craft unit, 4 Assault Squadron Royal Marines. The rear of Bulwark opens and floods a compartment, allowing the boats inside to be launched. The 64-metre (210 ft) flight deck is able to take two Sea King HC4 or Merlin medium-lift helicopters and stow a third. The deck can also support two Chinook heavy-lift helicopters, one down the side of the flight deck and one at the rear of the flight deck. Although the Albion design does not have a hangar, the ship has sufficient equipment to support helicopter operations.

Bulwark was launched at the BAE Systems shipyard at Barrow-in-Furness, Cumbria, on 15 November 2001. She is, to date, the most recent surface vessel to have been constructed at Barrow with the yard currently specialising in submarine construction.

In 2025, Bulwark was sold to the Brazilian Navy, becoming NDM Oiapoque.

== Operational history ==
Bulwark departed the UK in January 2006 for a six-month East of Suez maiden deployment. She conducted counter-terrorist and counter-piracy tasks in waters off the Horn of Africa. Bulwark then headed for the northern Persian Gulf to become the flagship of Task Force 158, providing security for Iraqi oil platforms. At the start of mid 2006 Bulwark was near Spain. Due to the 2006 Israel–Lebanon crisis, on 15 July 2006 she was ordered to divert to Lebanon and to support operations evacuating British citizens from the conflict area. On 20 July, she evacuated approximately 1,300 people from Beirut in the biggest British evacuation. On completion of her extended deployment the ship returned to the United Kingdom. At the start of June 2007 Bulwark was berthed at Sunderland on the River Wear.

In October 2008, Bulwark was at the Tail of the Bank in the Firth of Clyde together with the aircraft carrier Ark Royal and the French amphibious ship Tonnerre, taking part in Exercise Joint Warrior 2008.

On 18 February 2009, Bulwark sailed from Devonport as flagship to Commander UK Amphibious Task Group, Commodore Peter Hudson, on the Taurus 09 deployment. She was joined by Landing Platform Helicopter (LPH) Ocean, Type 23 frigates Argyll and Somerset and four ships of the Royal Fleet Auxiliary.

In May 2010, she entered a dry-dock at HMNB Devonport to refit, eventually rejoining the fleet in March 2011, and then took over as fleet flagship from her sister ship Albion in October 2011. She made a five-day visit to London on 16 March 2011. Bulwark undertook Operational Sea Training at the end of June 2011 in preparation to take up the role of fleet flagship of the Royal Navy. Bulwark was on standby as leading ship of the UK's recently formed Response Force Task Group. In October she participated in Exercise Joint Warrior in Loch Eriboll, the largest war games staged in the UK, involving the French Marines and other NATO forces.

On 15 February 2012, Bulwark made an unscheduled stop in Kiel, Germany, after ice on the Elbe river prevented her from entering the city of Hamburg as originally planned. At the end of February, Bulwark visited the Polish port of Gdynia, carrying out exercises with two Polish frigates, ORP Generał Kazimierz Pułaski and ORP Generał Tadeusz Kościuszko. She also hosted onboard over 4,000 people from the city. The vessel had entered the Baltic Sea to prepare for Exercise 'Cold Response', a NATO winter war games exercise due to take place in northern Norway in March 2012. In April, she also took part in Exercise 'Joint Warrior' with several other British and foreign vessels including the aircraft carrier HMS Illustrious off the coast of Scotland. She was part of the COUGAR 13 task group, with the Commander UK Task Group and his staff embarked on board. She was visited by the Commander of Naval Striking and Support Forces NATO.

At the end of May 2014, Bulwark visited Greenwich in London, where the public were able to visit the ship for tours conducted by the crew, and she also took part in celebrations marking the 350th anniversary of the formation of the Royal Marines. In late 2014 Bulwark was deployed for the COUGAR 14 Response Force Task Group annual exercise and the International Mine Counter Measures Exercise (IMCMEX).

Between April and July 2015 Bulwark was allocated to Operation Weald, the upgraded search and rescue operation of the Italian coast for migrants crossing from Libya. She was assisted by three Merlin HM.2 helicopters from 814 Naval Air Squadron. Bulwark recovered over 2,900 migrants from the sea during the operation. Bulwark assisted in providing security for the Commonwealth Heads of Government Meeting held in Malta in November. This duty was completed in December 2015.

In 2016, the ship was the flagship for Exercise Griffin Strike, the validation exercise for the Anglo-French Combined Joint Expeditionary Force, after which she participated in the Centenary commemorations for the Battle of Jutland in Scapa Flow. In July, the ship came alongside Sunderland and exercised the Freedom of the City of Durham with a full ceremonial parade through the streets, finishing with a service at St Cuthbert's Cathedral. In September 2016, the ship again acted as the flagship for the Joint Expeditionary Force (Maritime) 16 deployment (the new name for the COUGAR series of deployments) and, with COMATG embarked, deployed for exercises off (and with) Albania, France, Israel, Somaliland, and Oman.

As announced in 2011, Bulwark entered extended readiness (uncrewed reserve) in early 2017, and transferred her role as Fleet Amphibious Flagship to her sister ship Albion on her emergence from refit.

According to the Ministry of Defence, the planned out-of-service date for Bulwark is 2034. However, in October 2017, the BBC's Newsnight reported that the Ministry of Defence was considering decommissioning Bulwark and Albion as part of a package of cost-cutting measures intended to mitigate the expense of the Royal Navy's two new aircraft carriers. This action was reversed by then Secretary of State for Defence Gavin Williamson in September 2018.

In late 2020 Bulwark was dry-docked for phase two of her optimised support period. The ship was to remain in dry dock prior to undertaking a phase 3 "recertification package" ahead of her planned return to the fleet in 2023. In mid-2023 it was reported that the ship would not be ready for active operations until sometime in 2024. Then in March 2024 James Cartlidge, Minister of State at the Ministry of Defence, stated that the ship would in fact only return to operations "if required", suggesting that she would remain in uncrewed reserve upon completing her refit. However, this decision was reversed by the newly elected Labour Government in November 2024 which indicated that Bulwark was to be taken out of service, despite the fact that £72.1 million had already been spent on her refit.

In April 2025, at the LAAD 2025 expo in Rio de Janeiro, the Brazilian Navy and the Royal Navy signed a letter of intent for the transfer of HMS Albion (L14) and HMS Bulwark (L15).

On 10 September 2025, during the Defence and Security Equipment International in London, ex-Bulwark was officially sold to Brazil for £20m with the contract signed aboard HMS Mersey. In Brazilian service the ship will be renamed NDM Oiapoque.

== In the media ==
Bulwark was the featured ship in the second series of Warship originally shown on television channel Five in the UK. The season followed her during the Taurus 09 deployment.

Bulwark was heavily featured in Episode 2 of the 2017 series of Warship on Channel 4, which although based in HMS Ocean, followed the entire Joint Expeditionary Force (Maritime) 16 deployment.

== Affiliations ==
In 2015 HMS Bulwark supported the following affiliations:

- County Durham
- Royal Irish Regiment
- Worshipful Company of Coachmakers and Coach Harness Makers
- HMS Bulwark, Albion, and Centaur Association
- RAF Odiham
- St. Aloysius' College Scout Group, Malta
- Bishop of Durham
- Forest of Teesdale Primary School, Co Durham
- Durham Trinity School and Sports College
- Monkton Combe School Combined Cadet Force
- Training Ship Adventure, Bristol Sea Cadet Corps
- Training Ship Rhyl, Sea Cadet Corps
- Giggleswick School Combined Cadet Force
- Bishop Auckland Hospital
- Bidwell Brook School
