= Exercise Joint Warrior =

NATO multi-national military exercise

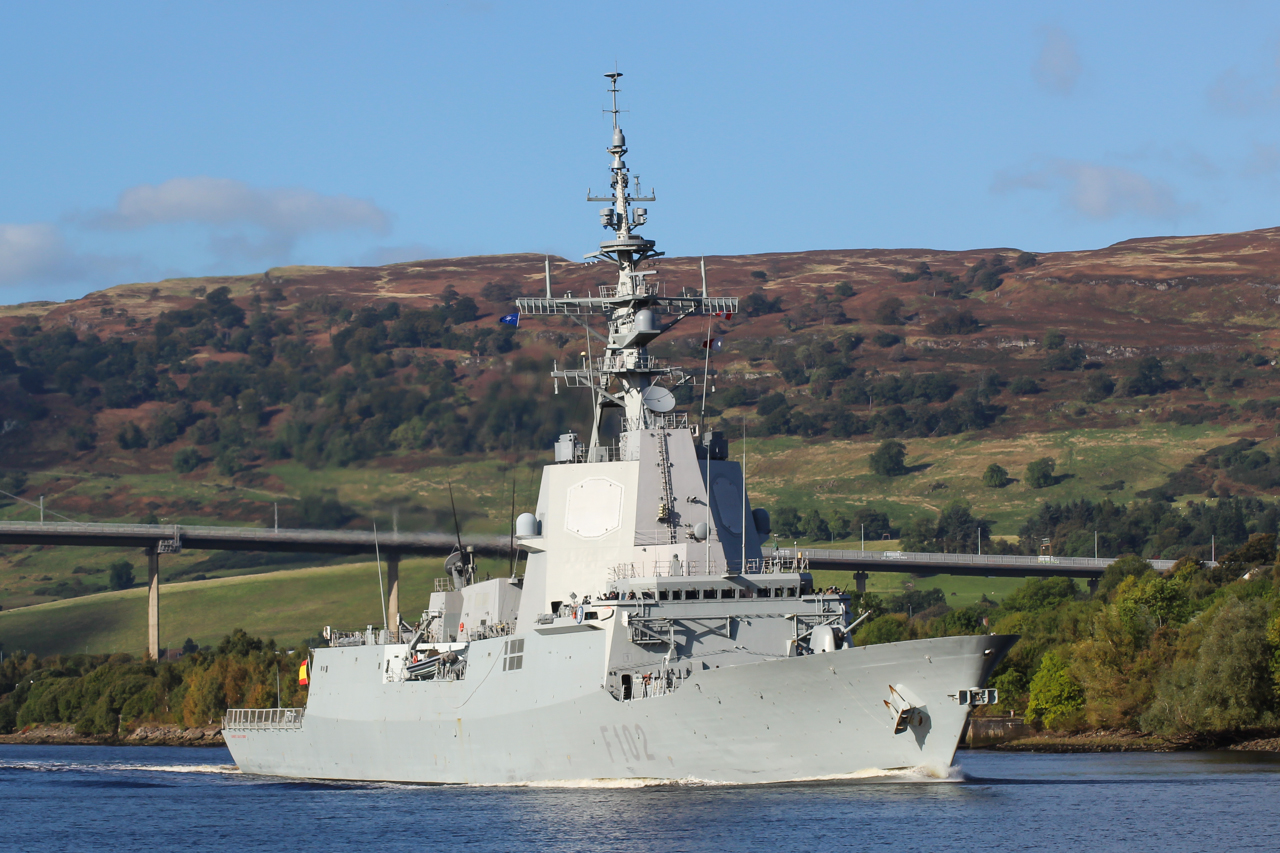
- Spanish frigate Almirante Juan de Borbón on the River Clyde, passing the Erskine Bridge at the beginning of Joint Warrior 16/2
- Status: Active
- Genre: Military exercise
- Frequency: Bi-annually
- Location: UK Waters
- Country: United Kingdom
- Years active: 80
- Established: 1946
- Previous event: JW 22-2 (1–14 October 2022)
- Next event: JW 23-1 (3-16 March 2023)
- Participants: Royal Navy, British Army, Royal Air Force, NATO members, others
- Organiser: Joint Training & Exercise Planning Staff
- Sponsor: NATO

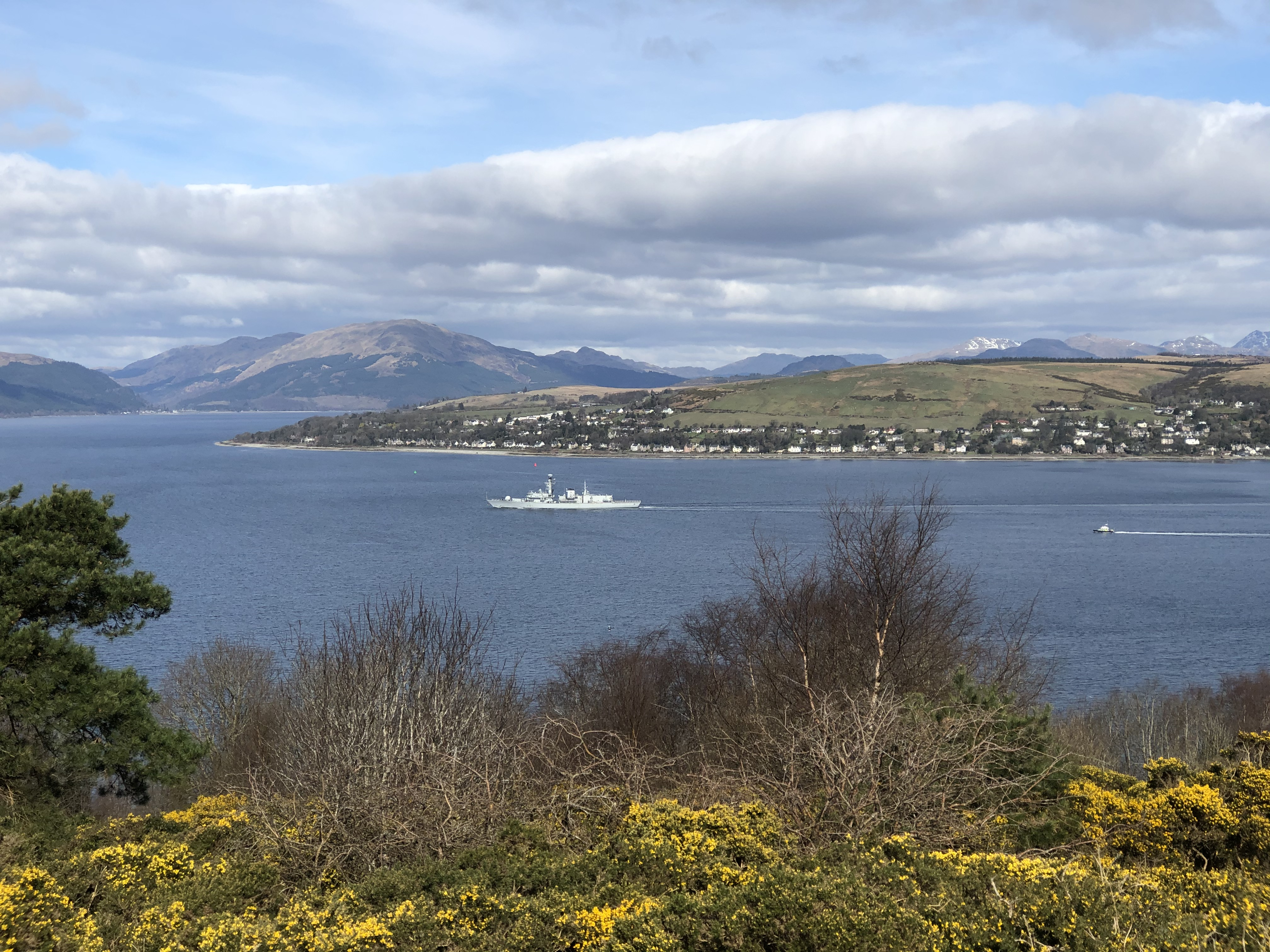
On the second day of Exercise Joint Warrior in 2020, HMS Sutherland heads west down the Firth of Clyde.

Exercise Joint Warrior is a major biannual multi-national military exercise which takes place in the United Kingdom, predominately in north west Scotland. It is the successor of the Neptune Warrior exercises and Joint Maritime Course. 2024 saw it replaced by Strike Warrior 24.

Joint Warrior is organised by the British Ministry of Defence and is Europe's largest military exercise and can involve up to 13,000 military personnel, from all three British Armed Forces, NATO and other allied countries. Up to 50 naval vessels, 75 aircraft and numerous ground-based units participate in a typical exercise. Operations include airborne assaults, amphibious landings and training in counter-insurgency, counter-piracy and interstate war. Live-fire exercises take place on various weapons ranges. Joint Warrior exercises take place in the spring and autumn and have a duration of two weeks.

The exercise aims to provide a multi-threat training environment where participants take part in collective training in preparation for deployment as a Combined Joint Task Force. Joint Warrior also provides a package of training to each participating unit which concentrates on its specialist role, but set within a larger war scenario.

== Background ==
The Joint Maritime Course (JMC) series of exercises started after the Second World War in order to improve co-operation between the Royal Navy and Royal Air Force in anti-submarine warfare. More recently, JMC exercises took place three times a year, in spring, summer and winter. In 2006 the exercise was re-branded as Neptune Warrior and in 2007 was reduced to two events per year. In 2008 the Joint Warrior name was introduced to reflect the increasing involvement of all three military branches. Each exercise is identified by the last two digits of the year it takes place and a number 1 or 2 depending on whether it is the first or second exercise of the year. For example, JMC 98/1 was the first Joint Maritime Course of 1998 and JW 15/2 was the second Joint Warrior exercise of 2015.

Throughout the Cold War the exercises focused on the anti-submarine warfare threat and utilised a NATO vs. Warsaw Pact scenario. Mustardia (red forces) represented a communist dictatorship and Cyanica (blue forces) a stable democracy. Since the late 1980s exercises have changed to reflect modern threats and theatres of war such as the Balkans, the Gulf and Afghanistan. Prior to the current core scenario, exercises were based on a civil war which broke out in Britannica in 1972, with the country then splitting into five smaller nations (Brownia, Mustardia, Cyanica, Ginger and Emeraldia). In order to represent the threat posed by al-Qaeda, the fictional terrorist group an-Quaich was introduced to exercises in 2003.

== Planning ==
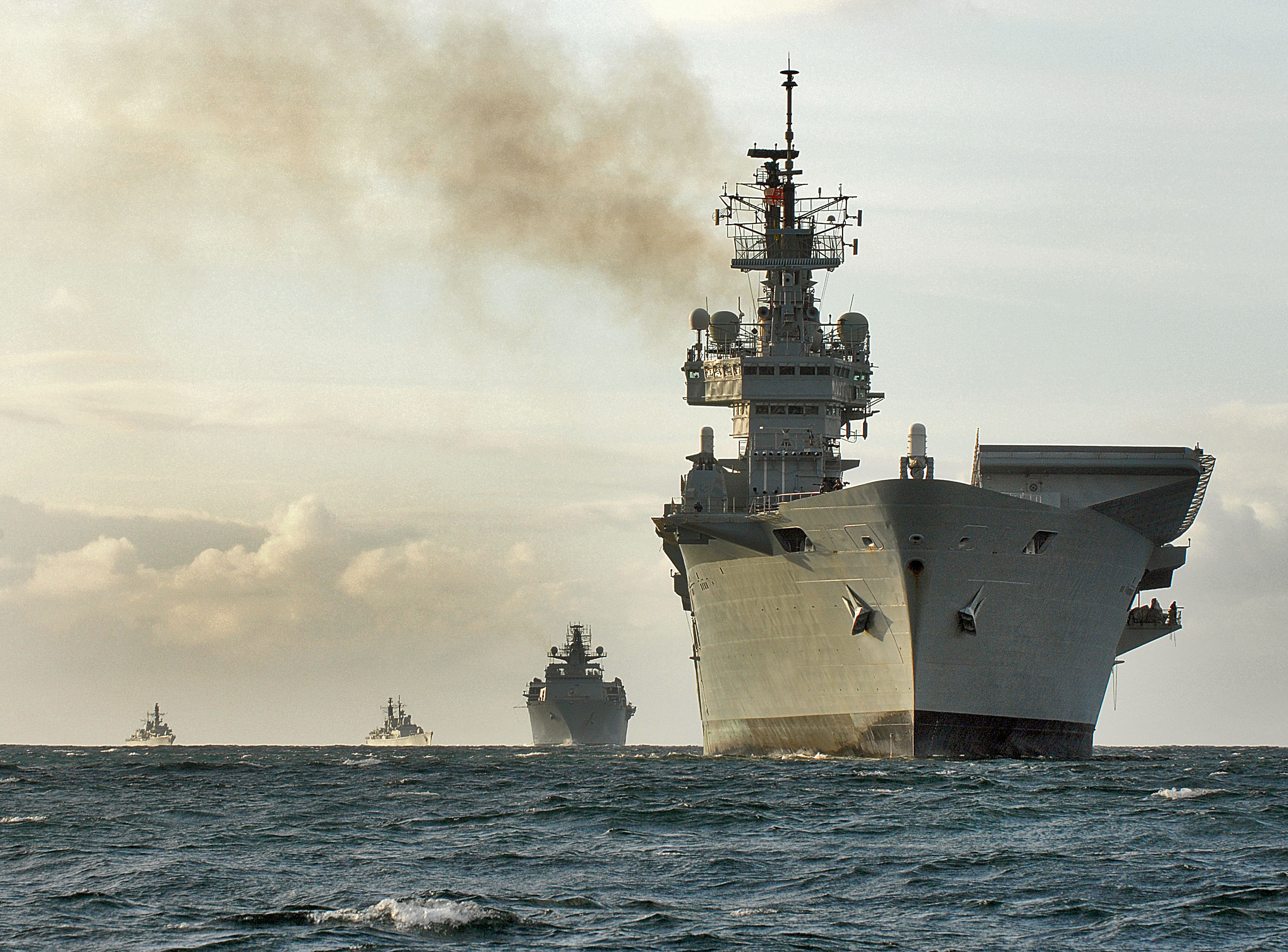
HMS Ark Royal at the head of a convoy during Exercise Joint Warrior in 2008, followed by HMS Bulwark, HMS Gloucester and HMS Somerset as they transit the Straits of Mull, Northwest Scotland.

The exercise is planned and co-ordinated by the Ministry of Defence Joint Training & Exercise Planning Staff (JTEPS) based in HMNB Portsmouth. Traditionally Exercise Control (EXCON) was based in the Maritime Operations Centre at HMNB Clyde, but since 2022 EXCON has moved to different locations, including RAF St Mawgan and Bodin Lair in Northern Norway.

The Joint Warrior exercises use a common core scenario which is based upon the fragmentation of the fictional ‘Ryanian Empire’ into four nations in the late 1960s, and the intervening period of history up to the present day. A bespoke scenario is then re-written for each Joint Warrior by the JTEPS which includes simulated political and military tensions, resulting in hostilities.

== Operations ==
Although Joint Warrior can utilise the whole of the UK including the surrounding seas and airspace, activity is generally focused off the north and north west of Scotland, Irish Sea and Moray Firth, where a freedom to manoeuvre in both deep and shallow water, a limited civilian population and low air and sea traffic provides ideal training conditions. The close proximity of air and sea weapons ranges such as Cape Wrath, Tain and Spadeadam is also beneficial.

=== Naval ===
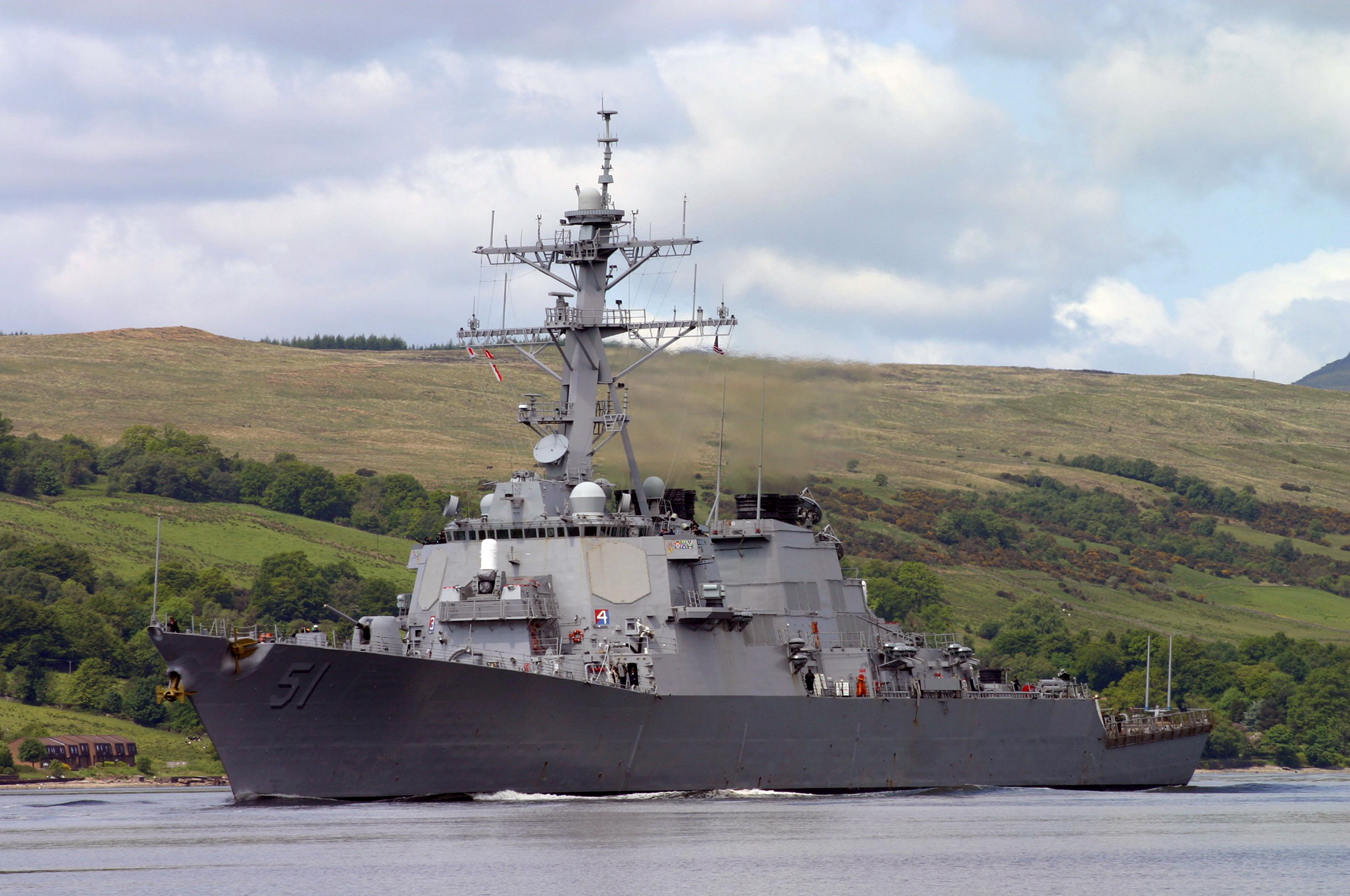
USS Arleigh Burke departs HMNB Clyde at Faslane during JMC 05/2.

A range of naval operations take place during Joint Warrior, including maritime task force deployment; mine countermeasures; counter-piracy, drugs and insurgency; electronic warfare, anti-submarine and anti-surface warfare, logistics and support training and air-land integration and air maritime integration. In order to replicate real-world operations as closely as possible, global positioning system (GPS) jamming takes place within remote areas. Prior to jamming taking place, consultation is undertaken with aviation and maritime communities to ensure disruption to civilians is minimised. Aerial and amphibious landings carried out by marines, typically occur at Luce Bay in Galloway and are launched from helicopter carriers and amphibious assault ships which aim to get as close to shore as possible without detection.

Up to 50 vessels have been known to take part, many of which visit UK ports such as Aberdeen, Port Glasgow, Greenock and Faslane (HMNB Clyde) before and after the exercises. For navies who do not regularly participate in Joint Warrior, a period of formal Operational Sea Training is normally required prior to the exercise.

=== Air ===
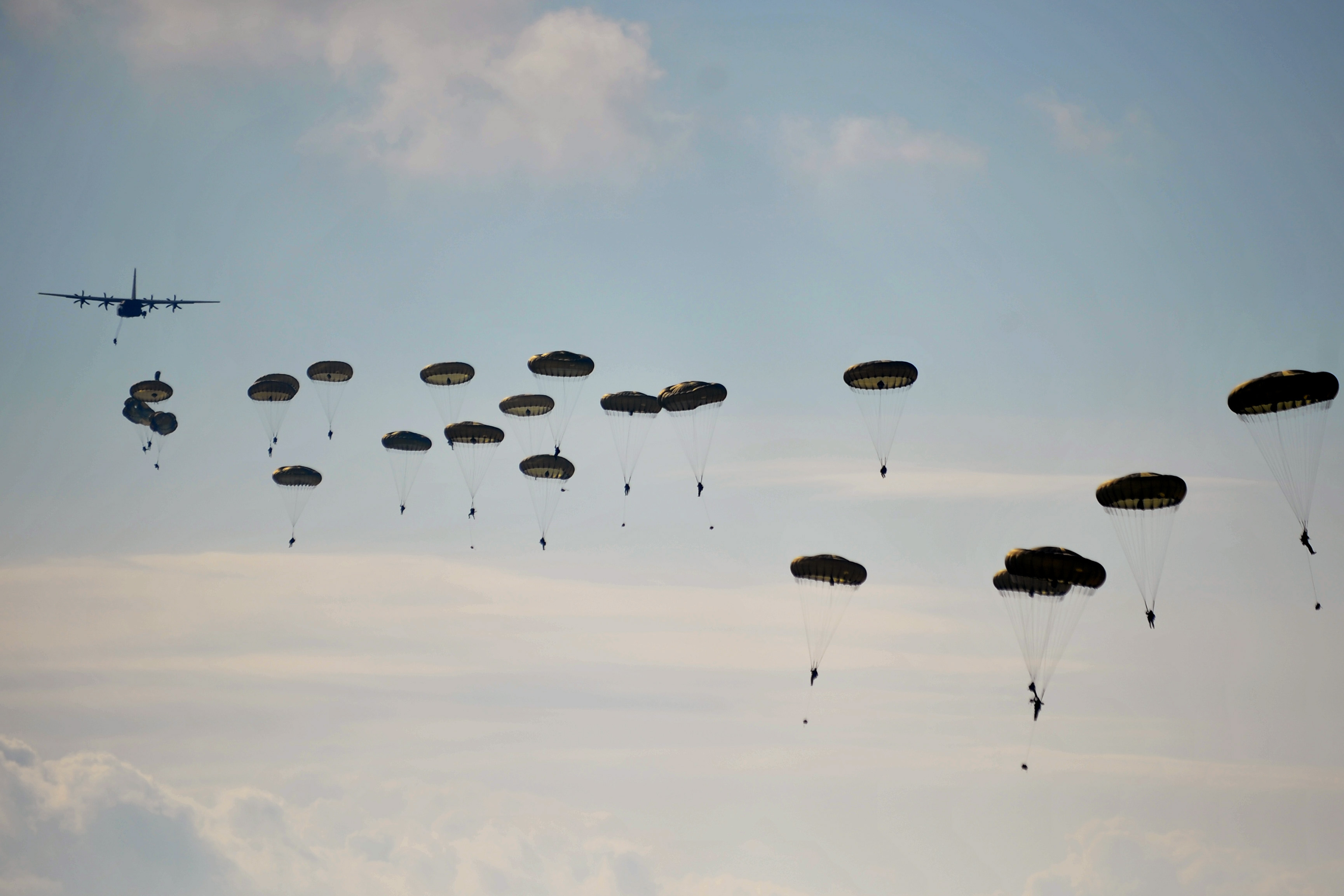
British paratroopers from 3 PARA descend following a drop by a C-130J during Exercise Joint Warrior 12/1

Around 75 aircraft participate in each exercise, representing a wide variety of air power capabilities including fast jets, Intelligence Surveillance Target Acquisition and Reconnaissance (ISTAR), Maritime patrol aircraft (MPA), Command and Control (C2) and attack and support helicopters.

Each day of the exercise can see more than 100 sorties flown from various bases in Scotland and around the UK. Regular participants which operate from their home airfields within the UK include, Typhoons from RAF Lossiemouth; C-130 Hercules and Voyagers based at RAF Brize Norton; E-3D Sentrys and Sentinel R1s based at RAF Waddington and United States Air Force F-15 Eagles from RAF Lakenheath.

Foreign as well at UK aircraft forward-deploy to Scottish airfields and those in northern England.

NATO E-3A Sentrys based at Geilenkirchen air base in Germany have also been known to participate.

Land based assets are complemented by ship based helicopters including Merlin, Lynx, Sea King and Wildcat and those of other participant nations. The USS Enterprise carrier battle group took part in JMC 01/2 and JMC 02/4.

==== RAF Lossiemouth ====
Since the transfer of RAF Kinloss to the British Army in 2012, RAF Lossiemouth, also in Morayshire, is now the primary airfield used as a base by foreign air-arms. The airfield hosts maritime patrol aircraft, with previous exercises having included RCAF CP-140 Auroras, United States Navy P-3 Orions and P-8 Poseidons, French and Italian Atlantiques and German and New Zealand P-3 Orions. A variety of fast jets from foreign nations have also deployed to the airfield, such as French Dassault Mirage 2000Ns and Dassault Rafales during NW 07/2, Swedish SAAB Gripens during JW 14/2 and Portuguese General Dynamics F-16 Falcons during JW 16/2. Lossiemouth has also been home to civilian-registered Dassault Falcon 20s of Cobham Aviation which operate alongside Royal Navy 736 Squadron BAE Systems Hawks in the simulated ship-attack role. Rotary wing aircraft which have operated from the airfield have included Royal Navy Westland Sea Kings in the airborne early warning role and United States Air Force Sikorsky HH-60G Pave Hawks used for combat search and rescue.

The wide variety of aircraft which are deployed to the airfield can result in large numbers of aviation enthusiasts visiting Lossiemouth during Joint Warrior exercises.

==== RAF Leeming ====
BAE Systems Hawks of No. 100 Squadron based at RAF Leeming in Yorkshire simulate enemy forces in the aggressor role. The airfield has also hosted fast jets such as French Air Force Dassault Alpha Jets and German Air Force Panavia Tornados.

==== MOD West Freugh ====
The airfield at MOD West Freugh in Dumfries and Galloway was temporarily re-activated by the RAF's Tactical Supply Wing during JW 14/1. Forward arming and refuelling facilities were established to support the helicopters of 16 Air Assault Brigade.

=== Ground ===
Ground training utilises the Defence Training Estate, commercial ranges and privately owned land. Aerial assaults take place to recapture airfields and have previously taken place at Castle Kennedy airfield, West Freugh airfield, Salisbury Plain Training Area and Kinloss Barracks. Other locations used include Edingham Castle, near Dalbeattie.

== Notable events ==
- During NW 07/1, two Russian Tupolev Tu-95 Bear aircraft were detected over the Outer Hebrides monitoring the exercise. RAF Tornado F3 fighter jets were scrambled from RAF Leuchars to escort the aircraft from UK airspace.
- Live-fire exercises forming part of JW 08/1 was blamed for causing a heath fire which affected 338 acres (137 ha) of land at Cape Wrath.
- The first firing of an AGM-114 Hellfire missile in the UK took place during JW 12/1 when two Army Air Corps Apaches flying from HMS Illustrious fired on targets in the sea off northern Scotland.
- After suffering a mechanical failure during JW 14/1, an Army Air Corps Apache helicopter made an emergency landing in a field near Maryculter, Aberdeenshire.

== Controversy ==
Concern has been raised by marine conservation charities that military activity associated with Joint Warrior, especially the use of sonar, is adversely affecting marine mammals.

A significant decrease in the sightings of cetaceans in West Scotland, particularly during the 1998 series of JMCs, led to the formation of a joint discussion forum consisting of the Ministry of Defence, Scottish Natural Heritage, environmental NGOs and concerned wildlife tour operators. As result, a code of conduct for naval operators was developed and areas where known cetacean activity is taking place are avoided during the exercises. However concerns continue to exist and the Hebridean Whale and Dolphin Trust vessel Silurian has been used during 2015 and 2016 exercises to monitor naval activity and any changes in marine-life behaviour.

== See also ==
- Armed forces in Scotland
- Military history of Scotland
