= Indomitable =

Indomitable may refer to:

== Fauna ==
- Indomitable melipotis or Melipotis indomita, a moth found in Central America

== Literature ==
- Early drafts of Herman Melville's novel Billy Budd had the ship HMS Bellipotent named as Indomitable
- "Indomitable" (short story), a short story by Terry Brooks, published in Robert Silverberg's Legends II, which serves as an epilogue to The Wishsong of Shannara
- Indomitable Spirit, a book authored by A. P. J. Abdul Kalam

== Military ==
- USNS Indomitable (T-AGOS-7), U.S. Navy surveillance ship

Two warships of the Royal Navy have been named HMS Indomitable:

- HMS Indomitable (1907), the world's first battlecruiser, launched in 1907 and scrapped in 1922
- HMS Indomitable (R92), an aircraft carrier launched in 1940 and scrapped in 1955
- The aircraft carrier HMS Ark Royal (R07), launched in 1980, was at one stage to be named HMS Indomitable

== Sport ==
- 'The Indomitable Lions', the nickname of the Cameroon national football team

== Other uses ==
- HMS Indomitable
- Indomitable (album)
