= HMS Albion (L14) =

2003 Albion-class landing platform dock of the Royal Navy

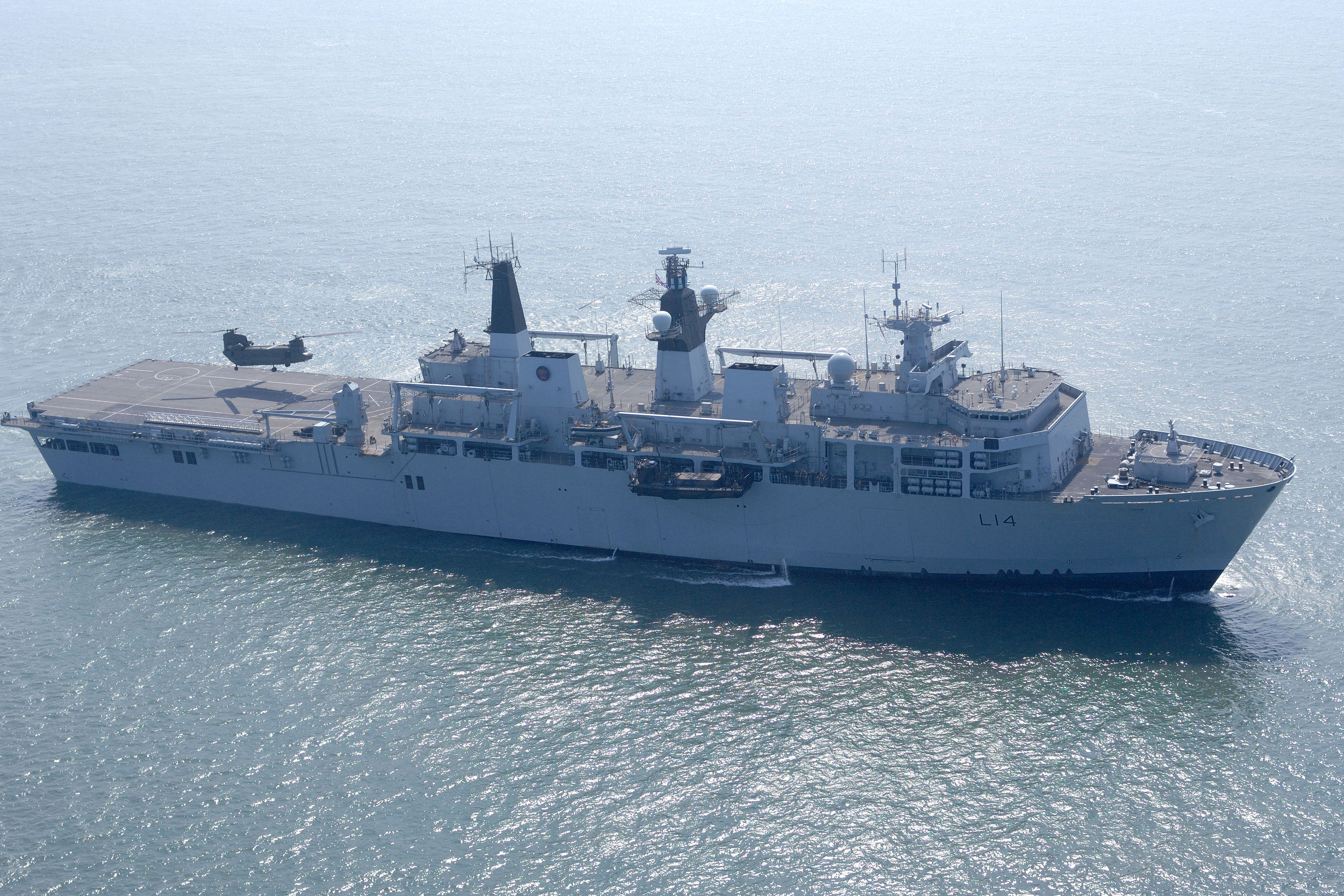
- HMS Albion pictured operating with Dutch Royal Marines.

History

United Kingdom
- Name: Albion
- Ordered: 18 July 1996
- Builder: BAE Systems Marine
- Laid down: 23 May 1998 Barrow-in-Furness, England
- Launched: 9 March 2001
- Sponsored by: The Princess Royal
- Commissioned: 19 June 2003
- Decommissioned: March 2025
- Refit: Major 2014–2017
- Home port: HMNB Devonport, Plymouth
- Identification: IMO number: 9160592; MMSI number: 234612000; Callsign: GDIU; Pennant L14; Deck code: AN
- Motto: Fortiter, Fideliter, Feliciter; "Boldly, Faithfully, Successfully"
- Status: Decommissioned, awaiting disposal
- Badge

General characteristics
- Class & type: Albion-class amphibious transport dock
- Displacement: 19,560 t (19,250 long tons; 21,560 short tons)
- Length: 176 m (577 ft 5 in)
- Beam: 28.9 m (94 ft 10 in)
- Draught: 7.1 m (23 ft 4 in)
- Propulsion: 2 × Wärtsilä Vasa 16V 32E diesel generators; 2 × Wärtsilä Vasa 4R 32E diesel generators; GE Power Conversion Full Electric Propulsion System, 2x electric motors and drives; Bow thruster
- Speed: 18 knots (21 mph; 33 km/h)
- Range: 8,000 miles (7,000 nmi; 13,000 km)
- Boats & landing craft carried: 2 × Pacific 22 Mk2; 4 × LCU MK10; 4 × LCVP MK5
- Capacity: 67 vehicles
- Troops: 405 Royal Marines (710 overload)
- Crew: 325
- Sensors & processing systems: 2 × Type 1007/8 I-band radars; 1 × Type 996 E/F band radar (until 2011); 1 × Type 997 E/F-band radar (from 2017)
- Armament: 2 × 20mm Phalanx CIWS (from 2017); 2 × Oerlikon 20 mm cannon; Browning .50 caliber heavy machine guns (as of 2023); 6 × 7.62 mm general purpose machine guns
- Aviation facilities: Two landing spots for helicopters up to the size of a Chinook.

HMS Albion was a landing platform dock originally built for the Royal Navy, the first of the two-ship Albion class. Built by BAE Systems Marine in Barrow-in-Furness, Albion was launched in March 2001 by the Princess Royal. Her sister ship, Bulwark, was launched in November 2001, also from Barrow. Affiliated to the city of Chester and based in Plymouth, she is the ninth ship to carry the name Albion (after Albion, an ancient name of Great Britain), stretching back to the 74-gun 1763 warship, and last carried by an aircraft carrier decommissioned in 1973 after 19 years service. Designed as an amphibious warfare ship, Albion carried troops, normally Royal Marines, and vehicles up to the size of the Challenger 2 main battle tank. She could deploy these forces using four Landing Craft Utility (LCUs) and four Landing Craft Vehicle and Personnel (LCVPs). A flight deck supports helicopter operations.

Albion's future came under review as part of the 2010 Strategic Defence and Security Review. She was the fleet flagship from December 2010 until October 2011, and then again from March 2018 until January 2021. On 20 November 2024 Defence Secretary John Healey announced that both Albion and her sister Bulwark would be withdrawn from service by March 2025.

On April 2025, at the LAAD 2025 expo in Rio de Janeiro, the navies of Brazil and the United Kingdom signed a letter of intent for the transfer of HMS Albion (L14) and HMS Bulwark (L15). However, as of February 2026, Defence Minister Luke Pollard said: "HMS ALBION is currently moored at HMNB Devonport and is being retained to support the generation of HMS BULWARK prior to her sale to Brazil. No plans for HMS ALBION’s disposal have been confirmed." In September 2026 it was reported that HMS Bulwark is sold to Brazil and HMS Albion will be scrapped.

== Operational history ==
Ordered for the Royal Navy on 18 July 1996, Albion was constructed by BAE Systems Marine at its shipyard in Barrow-in-Furness, Cumbria. The first steel was cut on 17 November 1997, and the ship's keel was laid down on 23 May 1998. The vessel was launched on 9 March 2001. She was commissioned into the Royal Navy on 19 June 2003 by her sponsor Anne, Princess Royal. Albion is the nameship of the Albion-class landing platform dock, which also includes Bulwark. The ship also carries a permanently embarked Royal Marines landing craft unit, 6 Assault Squadron, Royal Marines.

Along with sister ship Bulwark, Albion forms a key part of the Royal Navy's amphibious warfare capability. The ship can carry up to 256 soldiers in normal conditions, ordinarily Royal Marines. Albion can also carry their various associated armoured vehicles, up to the size of the Challenger 2 main battle tank. Vehicles can be deployed through an internal dock, using the ship's complement of four Landing Craft Utility (LCUs), while troops can be deployed from davits using four Landing Craft Vehicle and Personnel (LCVPs). Also equipped with a flight deck, the ship can operate two helicopters, with a third parked. CH-47s can sling-load RM BvS 10 Viking light tracked, amphibious armoured vehicles and deliver them ashore if the sea states are too severe for them to swim ashore.

=== 2003–2011 ===
In 2003, Albion was granted the Freedom of the City of Chester and also had a prominent role in the Queen's Colour Parade for the Royal Navy in Plymouth Sound; the third time a Fleet Colour has been given in the Royal Navy's history. In early 2004 the ship deployed on a multinational exercise for the first time, taking part in Exercise Joint Winter 04 off Norway, during which she completed her cold weather sea trials and was declared fully operational. Her next deployment was the Aurora exercises on the eastern seaboard of the United States. On 11 November 2004, the ship was sent to Ivory Coast to support Operation Phillis. Albion underwent a refit in early 2006, which included the installation of a new command, control, and communications suite.

Albion attended the HMNB Devonport Navy Days, 26–28 August 2006. Also in attendance was her sister ship, Bulwark, recently returned from the Lebanon evacuation. Ocean was unable to attend due to three sailors contracting tuberculosis; she was moved to HMNB Portsmouth.

During the Vela Deployment to West Africa, Albion acted as the Amphibious Task Group flagship. The deployment lasted from 11 September to 22 November 2006. Approximately 3,000 British personnel and 11 ships of the Royal Navy and Royal Fleet Auxiliary were involved. This deployment saw, for the first time, an Albion-class vessel taking part in amphibious operations with a Bay-class auxiliary landing ship dock, RFA Mounts Bay.

In late July and early August 2007, Albion was anchored off Sunderland during the city's air show.

In late 2008, Albion undertook her first refit, to upgrade various electronic and defence systems. During this docking period the Commanding Officer, Captain Wayne Keble, assumed command of Albion's sister ship, Bulwark.

In April 2010, during the air travel disruption after the 2010 Eyjafjallajökull eruption, Albion was sent to Santander, Spain as part of Operation Cunningham to bring back soldiers from the third battalion The Rifles battlegroup, Royal Air Force personnel and stranded British citizens. In May 2010, Albion together with HMS Ocean (L12) and other Royal Navy, French and US vessels, joined the multi-national AURIGA Task Group for amphibious exercises at Camp Lejeune in North Carolina.

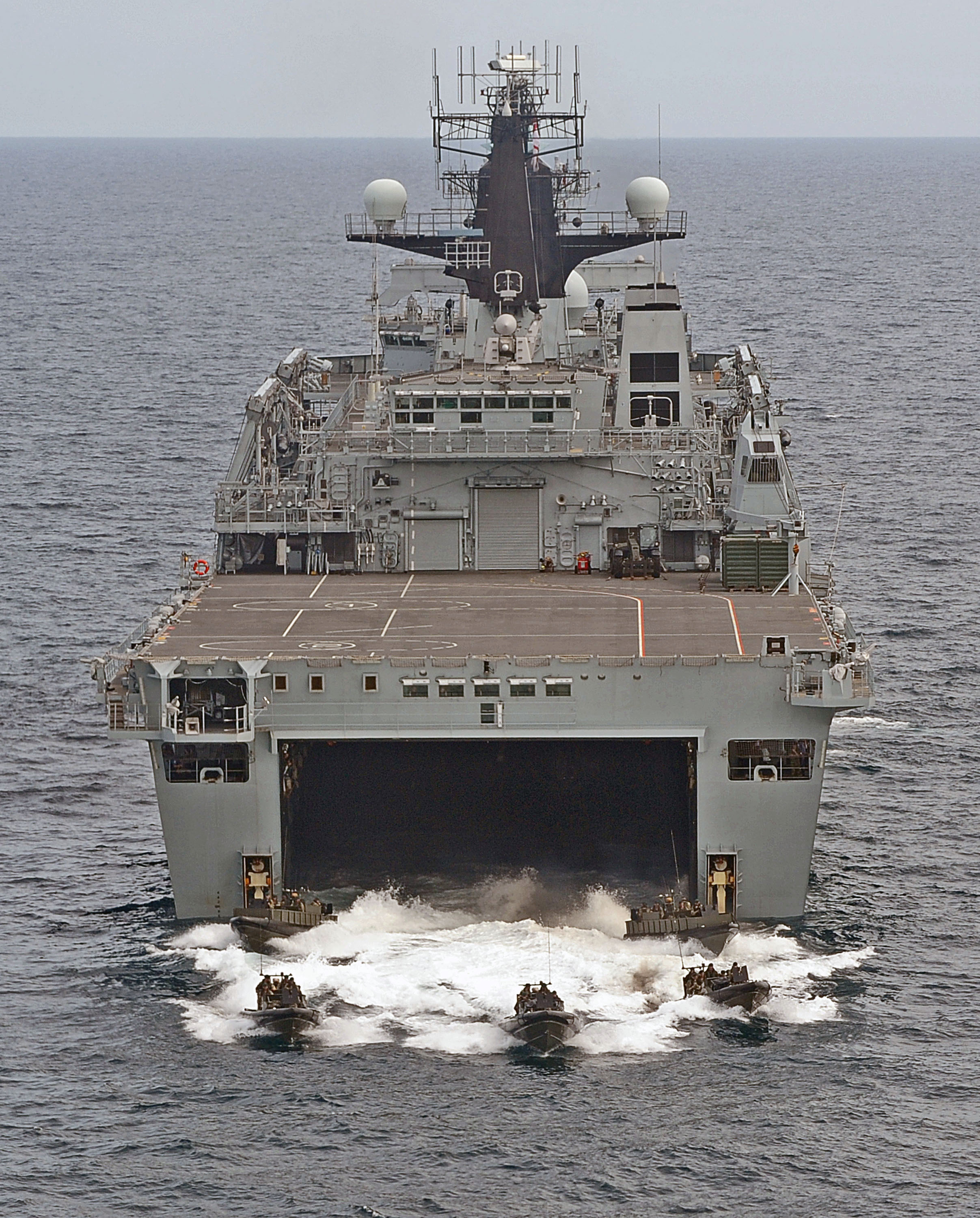
Royal Marines assault craft exiting the stern of HMS Albion during amphibious operations off North Carolina in 2010.

In late 2010, despite having been in commission for only seven years, the ship's future was uncertain, with either Albion or her sister ship Bulwark due to be put into extended readiness as a result of the 2010 Strategic Defence and Security Review.

In December 2010, Albion was announced as the next Royal Navy flagship and flagship of the UK Responsive Force Task Group, following the early decommissioning of the aircraft carrier Ark Royal, which occurred in March 2011, also as a result of the 2010 review.

In March 2011, Albion took part in Exercise Green Alligator with HQ of 3 Commando Brigade, the Joint Helicopter Command, the Royal Netherlands Marines Corps and 539 Assault Squadron RM. She was the main ship of the deployed Royal Navy Response Force Task Group. In May 2011, the Task Group took part in Exercise Cypriot Lion.

In June 2011, the ship had been redeployed along with the Response Force Task Group to the Gulf of Sidra off Libya to provide assistance to the ongoing NATO-led operation there. She subsequently continued on to the Indian Ocean, passing through the Suez Canal on 15 June, to assist with anti-piracy operations off the Horn of Africa.

On 20 September 2011, Albion docked at Liverpool Pier Head to celebrate her 10th anniversary with a six-day stay. She was open to the public on the following Saturday and Sunday (24 & 25 September 2011). This was her second visit to Liverpool, having previously visited in March 2010.

=== Extended readiness 2011–2017 ===
In late 2011 Albion entered a state of "extended readiness" (joining the UK's equivalent to a Reserve Fleet), after Bulwark completed a major refit.

In order to cut the running costs of the Royal Navy, the 2010 Strategic Defence and Security Review concluded that one of the Royal Navy's two landing platform docks, Albion and Bulwark, should be placed into extended readiness while the other is held at high readiness for operations. Both vessels will alternate between extended readiness and high readiness throughout their service lives.

It was confirmed that Albion would be the first of the two vessels placed at extended readiness, for a cost of £2.5 million as Bulwark had recently finished a major refit. Running costs while in extended readiness were estimated to be £300,000 per annum in order to keep the vessel available for reactivation at short notice if needed.

In December 2014, Albion was moved into dry dock at Plymouth to allow her hull to be inspected and cleaned prior to the major work being undertaken to reactivate the ship. The major refit, plus the associated work up period, was scheduled to take approximately 2.5 years, with Albion initially slated to assume the role of Fleet Flagship in April 2017.

The running costs of one of the Albion-class vessels at high readiness ranged from £17.7 million – £38.6 million per annum from 2007 to 2011.

Albion's refit included the fitting of Phalanx CIWS in place of the Goalkeeper CIWS, a Type 997 radar and a new command system.

=== 2017–present ===
Ship's staff moved back onboard Albion at the end of January 2017, formally taking responsibility for the ship from Babcock with the aim of taking Albion to sea for the first time in six years in summer 2017.

On 6 February 2018, Albion deployed for the first time since her refit to relieve Duncan as flagship of Standing NATO Maritime Group 2.

According to the Ministry of Defence, the planned out-of-service date for Bulwark is 2033. However, in October 2017, the BBC's Newsnight reported that the Ministry of Defence was considering decommissioning Albion and Bulwark, as part of a package of cost-cutting measures intended to mitigate the expense of the Royal Navy's two new aircraft carriers. This action was reversed by then Secretary of State for Defence Gavin Williamson in September 2018.

In April 2018, Albion was dispatched to the Asia-Pacific to assist in enforcing sanctions against North Korea.

On 4–6 February 2020, Albion hosted the crew of Uma, a 36-foot sailing yacht that is featured on the YouTube channel Sailing Uma. The Uma crew produced two episodes about their experiences on Albion.

In September 2020, Albion embarked on a unique deployment named Littoral Response Group eXperimental (LRG(X)). This would see the ship enter the Mediterranean with embarked Royal Marine Commando forces and Royal Naval personnel testing and developing pilot projects such as experimental unmanned aerial drones and autonomous vehicles for logistical and intelligence gathering purposes, in the operational environment. The deployment was the first that Albion had carried out with the full ships company remaining on board without leave, due to the COVID-19 pandemic.

On 27 January 2021, Albion transferred Fleet Flagship duty to HMS Queen Elizabeth (R08).

In July 2023, Albion returned to Devonport from her final deployment prior to going into a state of "reduced readiness" (skeleton crew on board for ship maintenance). It had been anticipated that HMS Bulwark would assume Albion's former frontline role in 2024 after completing a prolonged refit, though it was then reported that she would also be retained in reserve. Albion herself had been expected to remain in "extended readiness" (uncrewed reserve) until at least 2029 with her return to active operations at that point dependent on her receiving a further refit to allow her to continue in service into the early 2030s.

However, in November 2024 the government announced that Albion (along with her sister ship) would be taken out of service by March 2025.

== Affiliations ==
HMS Albion is affiliated with the following:

- City of Chester
- Mercian Regiment
- VII Squadron RAF
- C (Cheshire Yeomanry (The Earl of Chester's)) Squadron, Queen's Own Yeomanry
- Worshipful Company of Brewers
- Claire House Children's Hospice
- Plymouth Albion RFC
- West Bromwich Albion FC
- HMS Albion, Bulwark & Centaur Association
- University Technical College Plymouth
- Sea Cadet Corps, TS Deva (Chester)
- Trinity School Combined Cadet Force
- Chester Royal Naval Association
- Chester City Club
- Chester Races
