= HMS Ark Royal =

Five ships of the Royal Navy have borne the name HMS Ark Royal:

- Ark Royal (1587), the flagship of the English fleet during the Spanish Armada campaign of 1588
- HMS Ark Royal (1914), planned as freighter, built as seaplane carrier during the First World War, renamed Pegasus in 1934
- HMS Ark Royal (91), British aircraft carrier launched in 1937 which participated in the Second World War and was sunk by a U-boat in 1941
- HMS Ark Royal (R09), an Audacious-class aircraft carrier launched in 1950, decommissioned in 1979
- HMS Ark Royal (R07), an Invincible-class aircraft carrier, launched in 1981, decommissioned in 2011

== Battle honours ==
- Armada 1588
- Cádiz 1596
- Dardanelles 1915
- Norway 1940
- Spartivento 1940
- Mediterranean 1940–1941
- Bismarck 1941
- Malta Convoys 1941
- Al Faw 2003
