= Andrew Cunningham, 1st Viscount Cunningham of Hyndhope =

Royal Navy Admiral of the Fleet (1883–1963)

Admiral of the Fleet The Right Honourable The Viscount Cunningham of Hyndhope KT GCB OM DSO & Two Bars
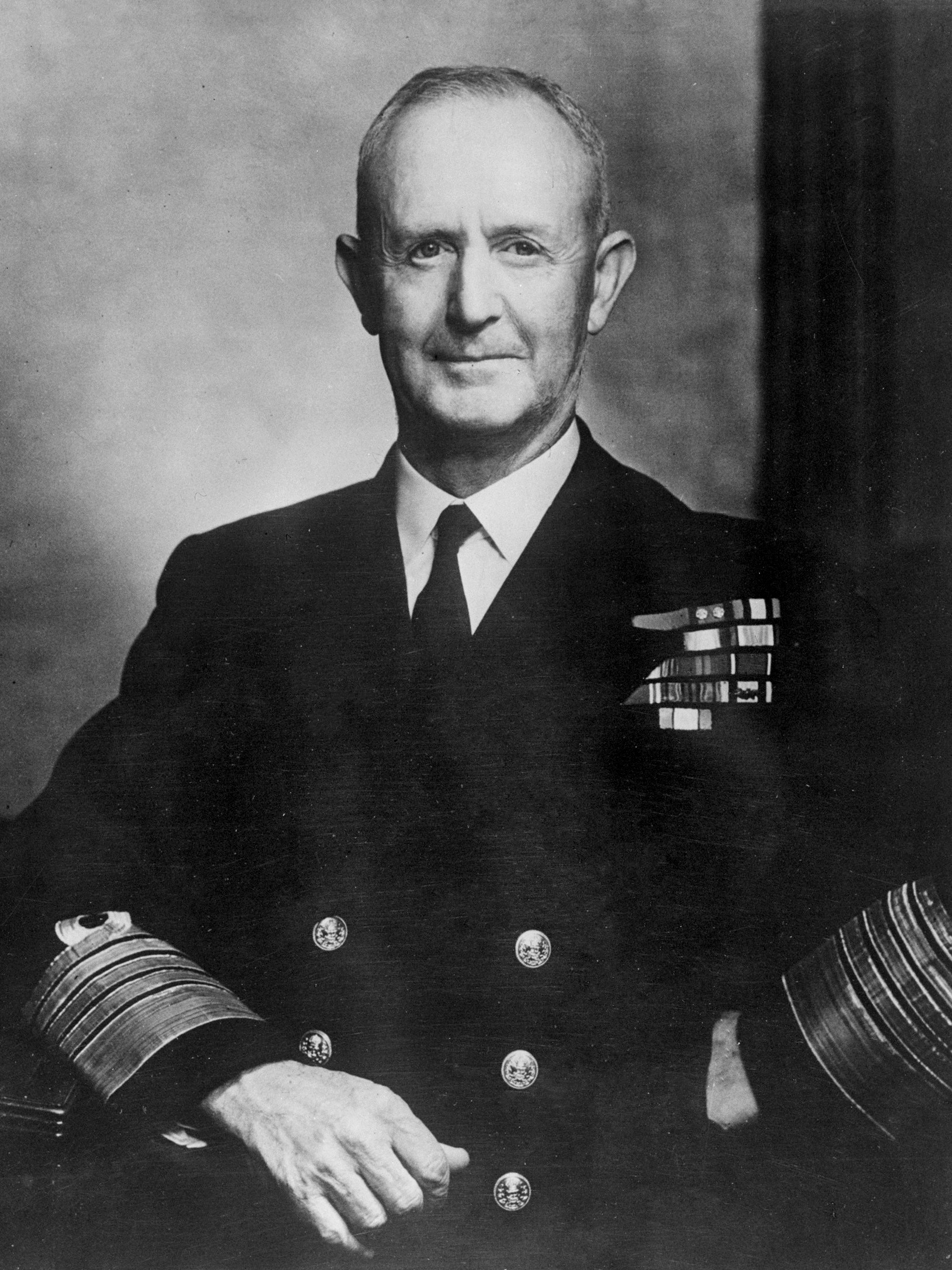
- Cunningham in 1943
- Born: Andrew Browne Cunningham; 7 January 1883; Rathmines, Ireland
- Died: 12 June 1963 (aged 80); London, England
- Burial place: Buried at sea off Portsmouth
- Spouse: Nora Christine Byath (m. 1929)
- Relatives: General Sir Alan Cunningham (brother)
- Military career
- Allegiance: United Kingdom
- Branch: Royal Navy
- Service years: 1897–1946
- Rank: Admiral of the Fleet
- Nickname: "ABC"
- Commands: HMS Scorpion; HMS Termagant; HMS Seafire; 6th Destroyer Flotilla; 1st Destroyer Flotilla; HMS Columbine; HMS Rodney; HMS Pembroke; Battlecruiser Squadron; Mediterranean Fleet; First Sea Lord
- Conflicts: Second Boer War; First World War; Pursuit of Goeben and Breslau; Dardanelles; British campaign in the Baltic; Second World War; Malta convoys; Siege of Malta; Attack on Mers-el-Kébir; Operation Hurry; Battle of Calabria; Operation MB8; Attack on Taranto; Operation Excess; Operation Abstention; Battle of Cape Matapan; Battle of Crete; Operation Torch; Allied invasion of Sicily; Allied invasion of Italy
- Awards: Viscountcy of Hyndhope; Knight of the Order of the Thistle; Knight Grand Cross of the Order of the Bath; Member of the Order of Merit; Companion of the Distinguished Service Order & Two Bars
- Other work: Lord High Commissioner to the General Assembly of the Church of Scotland; Lord High Steward

Admiral of the Fleet Andrew Browne Cunningham, 1st Viscount Cunningham of Hyndhope, KT, GCB, OM, DSO & Two Bars (7 January 1883 – 12 June 1963) was a Royal Navy officer best known for his service during World War II. He was widely known by his initials, "ABC".

Cunningham was born in Rathmines in the south side of Dublin on 7 January 1883. After starting his schooling in Dublin and Edinburgh, he enrolled at Stubbington House School, at the age of ten. He joined the Royal Navy in 1897 as a naval cadet in the officers' training ship Britannia, passing out in 1898. He commanded a destroyer during World War I and through most of the interwar period. He was appointed a Companion of the Distinguished Service Order and two Bars, for his performance during this time, specifically for his actions in the Dardanelles and in the Baltics.

In the Second World War, as Commander-in-Chief, Mediterranean Fleet, Cunningham led British naval forces to victory in several critical Mediterranean naval battles. These included the attack on Taranto in 1940, the first completely all-aircraft naval attack in history, and the Battle of Cape Matapan in 1941. Cunningham controlled the defence of the Mediterranean supply lines through Alexandria, Gibraltar, and the key chokepoint of Malta. He also directed naval support for the various major Allied landings in the Western Mediterranean littoral.

In autumn 1943, on the death of the incumbent, Sir Dudley Pound, Cunningham was promoted to First Sea Lord, the professional head of the Royal Navy, a position he held until his retirement in 1946. He was ennobled as Baron Cunningham of Hyndhope in 1945 and made Viscount Cunningham of Hyndhope the following year. After his retirement, Cunningham enjoyed several ceremonial positions, including Lord High Steward at the coronation of Queen Elizabeth II in 1953. He died on 12 June 1963, aged 80.

== Childhood ==
Cunningham was born at Rathmines, County Dublin, on 7 January 1883, the third of five children born to Professor Daniel John Cunningham and Elizabeth Cumming Browne, both of Scottish ancestry. General Sir Alan Cunningham was his younger brother. His parents were described as having a "strong intellectual and clerical tradition," both grandfathers having been in the clergy. His father was a Professor of Anatomy at Trinity College Dublin, whilst his mother stayed at home. Elizabeth Browne, with the aid of servants and governesses, oversaw much of his upbringing; as a result he reportedly had a "warm and close" relationship with her.

After a short introduction to schooling in Dublin he was sent to Edinburgh Academy, where he stayed with his aunts Doodles and Connie May. At the age of ten he received a telegram from his father asking "would you like to go into the Navy?" At the time, the family had no maritime connections, and Cunningham only had a vague interest in the sea. Nevertheless, he replied "Yes, I should like to be an Admiral". He was then sent to a Naval Preparatory School, Stubbington House, which specialised in sending pupils through the entrance examinations. Cunningham passed the exams, showing particular strength in mathematics.

== Early naval career ==
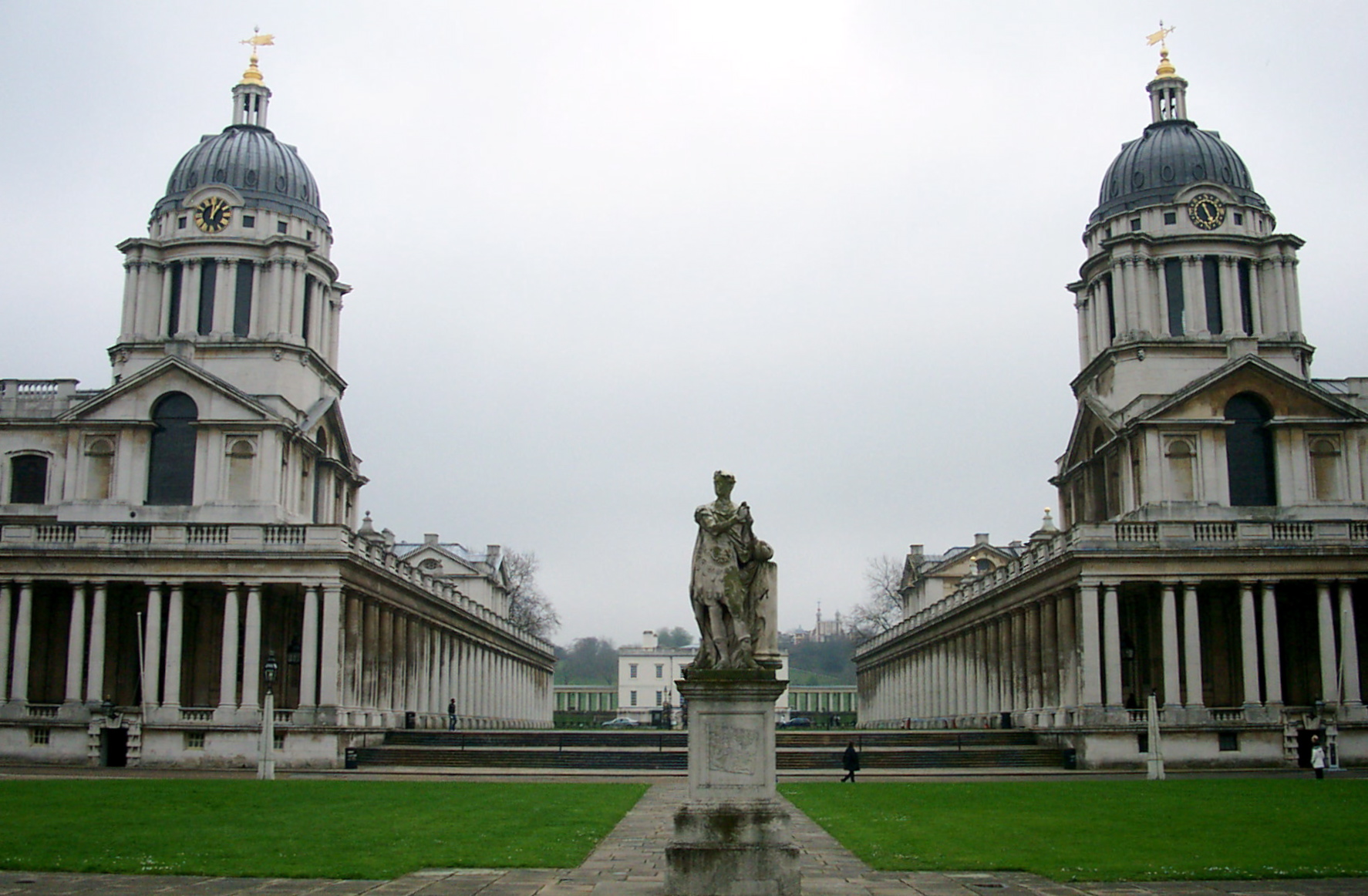
The Royal Naval College, Greenwich, where Cunningham took two sub-lieutenants' courses

Along with 64 other boys Cunningham joined the Royal Navy as a cadet aboard the training ship Britannia at Dartmouth on 15 January 1897. One of his classmates was future Admiral of the Fleet Sir James Somerville. Cunningham was known for his lack of enthusiasm for field sports, although he did enjoy golf and spent most of his spare time "messing around in boats". He said in his memoirs that by the end of his course he was "anxious to seek adventure at sea". Although he committed numerous minor misdemeanours, he still obtained a very good for conduct. He passed out tenth in April 1898, with first class marks for mathematics and seamanship.

His first service was as a midshipman on HMS Doris in 1899, serving at the Cape of Good Hope Station when the Second Boer War began. By February 1900, he had transferred into the Naval Brigade as he believed "this promised opportunities for bravery and distinction in action." Cunningham then saw action at Pretoria and Diamond Hill as part of the Naval Brigade. He then went back to sea, as midshipman in HMS Hannibal in December 1901. The following November he joined the protected cruiser Diadem. Beginning in 1902, Cunningham took sub-lieutenant courses at Portsmouth and Greenwich; he served as sub-lieutenant on the battleship Implacable, in the Mediterranean, for six months in 1903. In September 1903, he was transferred to HMS Locust to serve as second-in-command. He was promoted to lieutenant in 1904, and served on several vessels during the next four years. In 1908, he was awarded his first command, HM Torpedo Boat No. 14.

== First World War ==
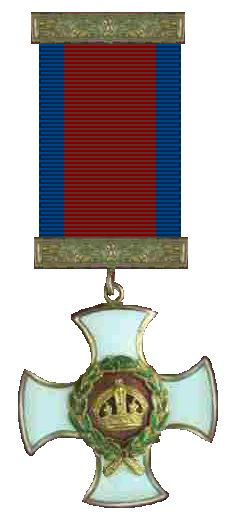
Distinguished Service Order insignia

Cunningham was a highly decorated officer during the First World War, being appointed a Companion of the Distinguished Service Order (DSO) and two bars. In 1911 he was given command of the destroyer HMS Scorpion, which he commanded throughout the war. In 1914, Scorpion was involved in the shadowing of the German battlecruiser and cruiser Goeben and Breslau. This operation was intended to find and destroy the Goeben and the Breslau but the German warships evaded the British fleet, and passed through the Dardanelles to reach Constantinople. Their arrival contributed to the Ottoman Empire joining the Central Powers in November 1914. Although a bloodless "battle", the failure of the British pursuit had enormous political and military ramifications; in the words of Winston Churchill, they brought "more slaughter, more misery and more ruin than has ever before been borne within the compass of a ship."

Cunningham stayed on in the Mediterranean and in 1915 Scorpion was involved in the attack on the Dardanelles. For his performance, Cunningham was rewarded with promotion to commander in July 1915. He was also appointed a Companion of the Distinguished Service Order, gazetted in March 1916. Cunningham spent much of 1916 on routine patrols. In late 1916, he was engaged in convoy protection, a duty he regarded as mundane. He had no contact with German U-boats during this time, on which he commented; "The immunity of my convoys was probably due to sheer luck". Convinced that the Mediterranean held few offensive possibilities he requested to sail for home. Scorpion paid off on 21 January 1918. In his seven years as captain of the Scorpion, Cunningham had developed a reputation for first class seamanship. He was transferred by Vice-Admiral Roger Keyes to HMS Termagant, part of Keyes' Dover Patrol, in April 1918. For his actions with the Dover Patrol, he was awarded a bar to his DSO the following year.

== Interwar years ==
=== Association with Cowan ===
Cunningham saw much action in the interwar years. In 1919, he commanded the S-class destroyer Seafire, on duty in the Baltic. The Communists, the White Russians, several varieties of Latvian nationalists and the Germans were trying to control Latvia; the British Government had recognised Latvia's independence after the Treaty of Brest-Litovsk. It was on this voyage that Cunningham first met Admiral Walter Cowan. Cunningham was impressed by Cowan's methods, specifically his navigation of the potentially dangerous seas, with thick fog and minefields threatening the fleet.

Throughout several potentially problematic encounters with German forces trying to undermine the Latvian independence movement, Cunningham exhibited "good self control and judgement". Cowan was quoted as saying "Commander Cunningham has on one occasion after another acted with unfailing promptitude and decision, and has proved himself an Officer of exceptional valour and unerring resolution."

He was promoted to the rank of captain, effective 31 December 1919. For his actions in the Baltic, Cunningham was awarded a second bar to his DSO, gazetted in March 1920. His first appointment as a Captain was President of the Naval Inter-Allied Commission of Control in Heligoland. On his return from the Baltic in 1922, he was appointed captain of the 6th Destroyer Flotilla, then the 1st Destroyer Flotilla later in the year, and the naval base, HMS Columbine, at Port Edgar in the Firth of Forth, from 1924 to 1926. Cunningham renewed his association with Vice Admiral Cowan between 1926 and 1928, when Cunningham was flag captain and chief staff officer to Cowan while serving on the North America and West Indies Squadron, based at the Royal Naval Dockyard in the Imperial fortress colony of Bermuda, with shore headquarters at Admiralty House in Pembroke. In his memoirs Cunningham made clear the "high regard" in which he held Cowan, and the many lessons he learned from him during their two periods of service together.

The late 1920s found Cunningham back in the UK participating in courses at the Army's Senior Officers' School at Sheerness, as well as at the Imperial Defence College. While Cunningham was at the Imperial Defence College, in 1929, he married Nona Byatt (daughter of Horace Byatt, MA; the couple had no children). After a year at the College, Cunningham was given command of his first big ship; the battleship Rodney. Eighteen months later, he was appointed commodore of HMS Pembroke, the Royal Naval Barracks, Chatham.

=== Promoted to flag rank ===
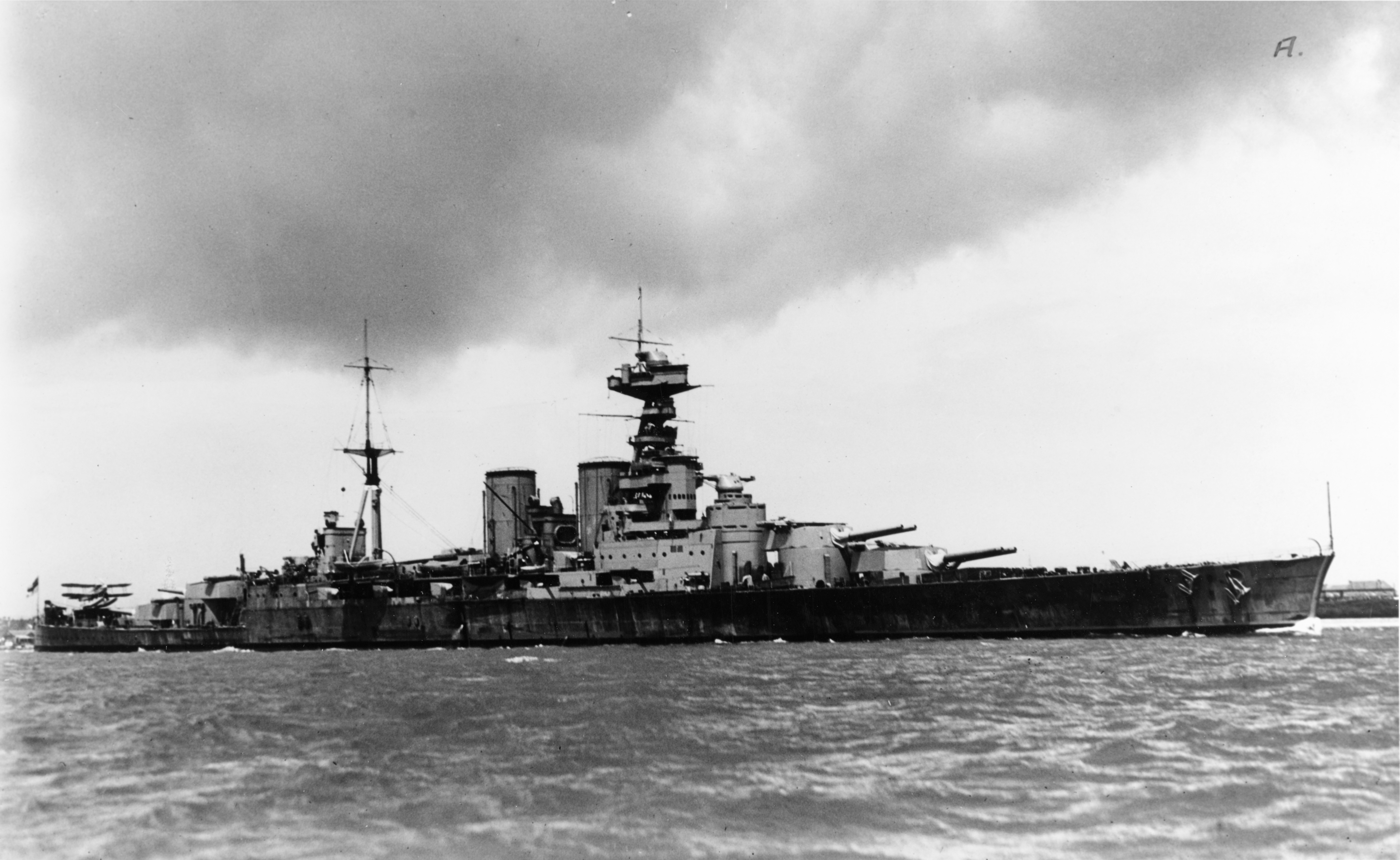
The battlecruiser HMS Hood, Cunningham's flagship as second-in-command of the Mediterranean Fleet

In September 1932, Cunningham was promoted to flag rank, and aide-de-camp to the King. He was appointed Rear Admiral (Destroyers) in the Mediterranean in December 1933 and was made a Companion of the Bath in 1934. Having hoisted his flag in the light cruiser Coventry, Cunningham used his time to practise fleet handling for which he was to receive much praise in the Second World War. There were also fleet exercises in the Atlantic Ocean in which he learnt the skills and values of night actions that he would also use to great effect in years to come.

On his promotion to vice admiral in July 1936, due to the interwar naval policy, further active employment seemed remote. However, a year later due to the illness of Sir Geoffrey Blake, Cunningham assumed the combined appointment of commander of the Battlecruiser Squadron and second-in-command of the Mediterranean Fleet, with HMS Hood as his flagship. After his long service in small ships, Cunningham considered his accommodation aboard Hood to be almost palatial, even surpassing his previous big ship experience on Rodney.

He retained command until September 1938, when he was appointed to the Admiralty as Deputy Chief of the Naval Staff, although he did not actually take up this post until December 1938. He accepted this shore job with reluctance since he loathed administration, but the Board of Admiralty's high regard of him was evident. For six months during an illness of Admiral Sir Roger Backhouse, the then First Sea Lord, he deputised for Backhouse on the Committee of Imperial Defence and on the Admiralty Board. In 1939 he was made a Knight Commander of the Order of the Bath (KCB), becoming known as Sir Andrew Cunningham.

== Second World War ==
Cunningham described the command of the Mediterranean Fleet as "The finest command the Royal Navy has to offer" and he remarked in his memoirs that "I probably knew the Mediterranean as well as any Naval Officer of my generation". Cunningham was made Commander-in-Chief, Mediterranean, hoisting his flag in HMS Warspite on 6 June 1939, one day after arriving in Alexandria on 5 June 1939. As Commander-in-Chief, Cunningham's main concern was for the safety of convoys heading for Egypt and Malta. These convoys were highly significant in that they were desperately needed to keep Malta, a small British colony and naval base, in the war. Malta was a strategic strongpoint and Cunningham fully appreciated this. Cunningham believed that the main threat to British sea power in the Mediterranean would come from the Italian Fleet. As such Cunningham had his fleet at a heightened state of readiness, so that when Italy did choose to enter into hostilities the British Fleet would be ready.

=== French Surrender (June 1940) ===
In his role as Commander-in-Chief, Mediterranean, Cunningham had to negotiate with the French Admiral René-Émile Godfroy for the demilitarisation and internment of the Force X, the French squadron at Alexandria, in June 1940, following the Fall of France. Churchill had ordered Cunningham to prevent the French warships from leaving port, and to ensure that French warships did not pass into enemy hands. Stationed at the time at Alexandria, Cunningham entered into delicate negotiations with Godfroy to ensure his fleet, which consisted of the battleship Lorraine, four cruisers, three destroyers and a submarine, posed no threat. The Admiralty ordered Cunningham to complete the negotiations on 3 July.

Just as an agreement seemed imminent Godfroy heard of the British action against the French at Mers el Kebir and, for a while, Cunningham feared a battle between French and British warships in the confines of Alexandria harbour. The deadline was overrun but negotiations ended well, after Cunningham put them on a more personal level and had the British ships appeal to their French opposite numbers.

Cunningham's negotiations succeeded and the French emptied their fuel bunkers and removed the firing mechanisms from their guns. Cunningham in turn promised to repatriate the ships' crews.

=== Battle of Taranto (November 1940) ===
Although the threat from the French Fleet had been neutralised, Cunningham was still aware of the threat posed by the Italian Fleet to British North African operations, based in Egypt. Although the Royal Navy had won in several actions in the Mediterranean, considerably upsetting the balance of power, the Italians who were following the theory of a fleet in being had left their ships in harbour. This made the threat of a sortie against the British Fleet a serious problem. At the time the harbour at Taranto contained six battleships (five of them battle-worthy), seven heavy cruisers, two light cruisers, and eight destroyers. The Admiralty, concerned with the potential for an attack, had drawn up Operation Judgement; a surprise attack on Taranto Harbour. To carry out the attack, the Admiralty sent the new aircraft carrier HMS Illustrious, commanded by Lumley Lyster, to join HMS Eagle in Cunningham's fleet.

The attack started at 21:00, 11 November 1940, when the first of two waves of Fairey Swordfish torpedo bombers took off from Illustrious, followed by the second wave an hour later. The attack was a great success: the Italian fleet lost half its strength in one night. The "fleet-in-being" diminished in importance and the threat to the Royal Navy's control of the Mediterranean had been considerably reduced. Cunningham said of the victory: "Taranto, and the night of 11–12 November 1940, should be remembered for ever as having shown once and for all that in the Fleet Air Arm the Navy has its most devastating weapon." The Royal Navy had launched the first all-aircraft naval attack in history, flying a small number of aircraft from an aircraft carrier. This, and other aspects of the raid, were important facts in the planning of the Japanese attack on Pearl Harbor in 1941: the Japanese planning staff were thought to have studied it intensively.

Cunningham's official reaction at the time was memorably terse. After landing the last of the attacking aircraft, Illustrious signalled "Operation Judgement executed". After seeing aerial reconnaissance photographs the next day which showed several Italian ships sunk or out of action, Cunningham replied with the two-letter code group which signified, "Manoeuvre well executed".

=== Battle of Cape Matapan (March 1941) ===
Battle summary of Cape Matapan

At the end of March 1941, Hitler wanted the convoys supplying the British Expeditionary force in Greece stopped, and the Italian Navy was the only force able to attempt this. Cunningham stated in his biography: "I myself was inclined to think that the Italians would not try anything. I bet Commander Power, the Staff Officer, Operations, the sum of ten shillings that we would see nothing of the enemy."

Under pressure from Germany, the Italian Fleet planned to launch an attack on the British Fleet on 28 March 1941. The Italian commander, Admiral Angelo Iachino, intended to carry out a surprise attack on the British Cruiser Squadron in the area (commanded by Vice-Admiral Sir Henry Pridham-Wippell), executing a pincer movement with the battleship Vittorio Veneto. Cunningham though, was aware of Italian naval activity through intercepts of Italian Enigma messages. Although Italian intentions were unclear, Cunningham's staff believed an attack upon British troop convoys was likely and orders were issued to spoil the enemy plan and, if possible, intercept their fleet. Cunningham wished, however, to disguise his own activity and arranged for a game of golf and a fictitious evening gathering to mislead enemy agents (he was, in fact, overheard by the local Japanese Consul).

After sunset, he boarded HMS Warspite and left Alexandria. Cunningham, realising that an air attack could weaken the Italians, ordered an attack by the Formidable's Albacore torpedo-bombers. A hit on the Vittorio Veneto slowed her temporarily and Iachino, realising his fleet was vulnerable without air cover, ordered his forces to retire. Cunningham gave the order to pursue the Italian Fleet.

An air attack from the Formidable had disabled the cruiser Pola, and Iachino, unaware of Cunningham's pursuing battlefleet, ordered a squadron of cruisers and destroyers to return and protect the Pola. Cunningham, meanwhile, was joining up with Pridham-Wippell's cruiser squadron. Throughout the day several chases and sorties occurred with no overall victor. None of the Italian ships were equipped for night fighting, and when night fell, they made to return to Taranto. The British battlefleet equipped with radar detected the Italians shortly after 22:00. In a pivotal moment in naval warfare during the Second World War, the battleships Barham, Valiant and Warspite opened fire on two Italian cruisers at only 3,800 yards (3.5 km), destroying them in only five minutes.

Although the Vittorio Veneto escaped from the battle by returning to Taranto, there were many accolades given to Cunningham for continuing the pursuit at night, against the advice of his staff. After the previous defeat at Taranto, the defeat at Cape Matapan dealt another strategic blow to the Italian Navy. Five ships—three heavy cruisers and two destroyers—were sunk, and around 2,400 Italian sailors were killed, missing or captured. The British lost only three aircrew when one torpedo bomber was shot down. Cunningham had lost his bet with Commander Power but he had won a strategic victory in the war in the Mediterranean. The defeats at Taranto and Cape Matapan meant that the Italian Navy did not intervene in the heavily contested evacuations of Greece and Crete, later in 1941. It also ensured that, for the remainder of the war, the Regia Marina conceded the Eastern Mediterranean to the Allied Fleet, and did not leave port for the remainder of the war.

=== Battle of Crete (May 1941) ===
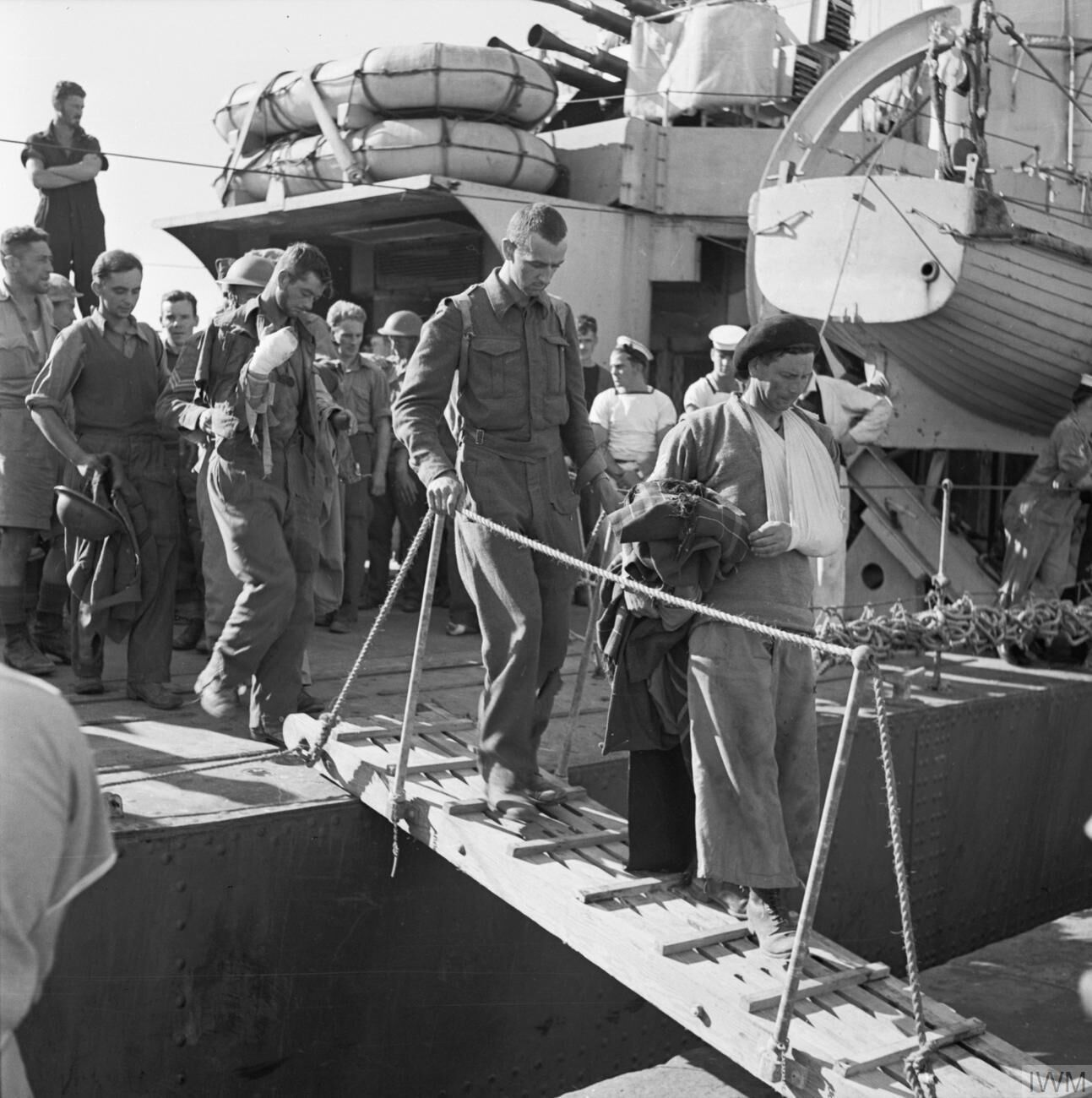
British wounded evacuated to Alexandria

On the morning of 20 May 1941, Nazi Germany launched an airborne invasion of Crete, under the code-name Unternehmen Merkur (Operation Mercury). Despite initial heavy casualties, Maleme airfield in western Crete fell to the Germans and enabled them to fly in heavy reinforcements and overwhelm the Allied forces.

After a week of heavy fighting, British commanders decided that the situation was hopeless and ordered a withdrawal from Sfakia. During the next four nights, 16,000 troops were evacuated to Egypt by ships (including HMS Ajax of Battle of the River Plate fame). A smaller number of ships were to withdraw troops on a separate mission from Heraklion, but these ships were attacked en route by Luftwaffe dive bombers. Without air cover, Cunningham's ships suffered serious losses. Cunningham was determined, though, that the "navy must not let the army down", and when army generals feared he would lose too many ships, Cunningham said,

It takes the Navy three years to build a ship. It will take three hundred years to build a new tradition. The evacuation will continue.

The "never say die" attitude of Cunningham and the men under his command meant that of 22,000 men on Crete, 16,500 were rescued but at the loss of three cruisers and six destroyers. Fifteen other major warships were damaged.

=== Allied Expeditionary Force (1942–43) ===
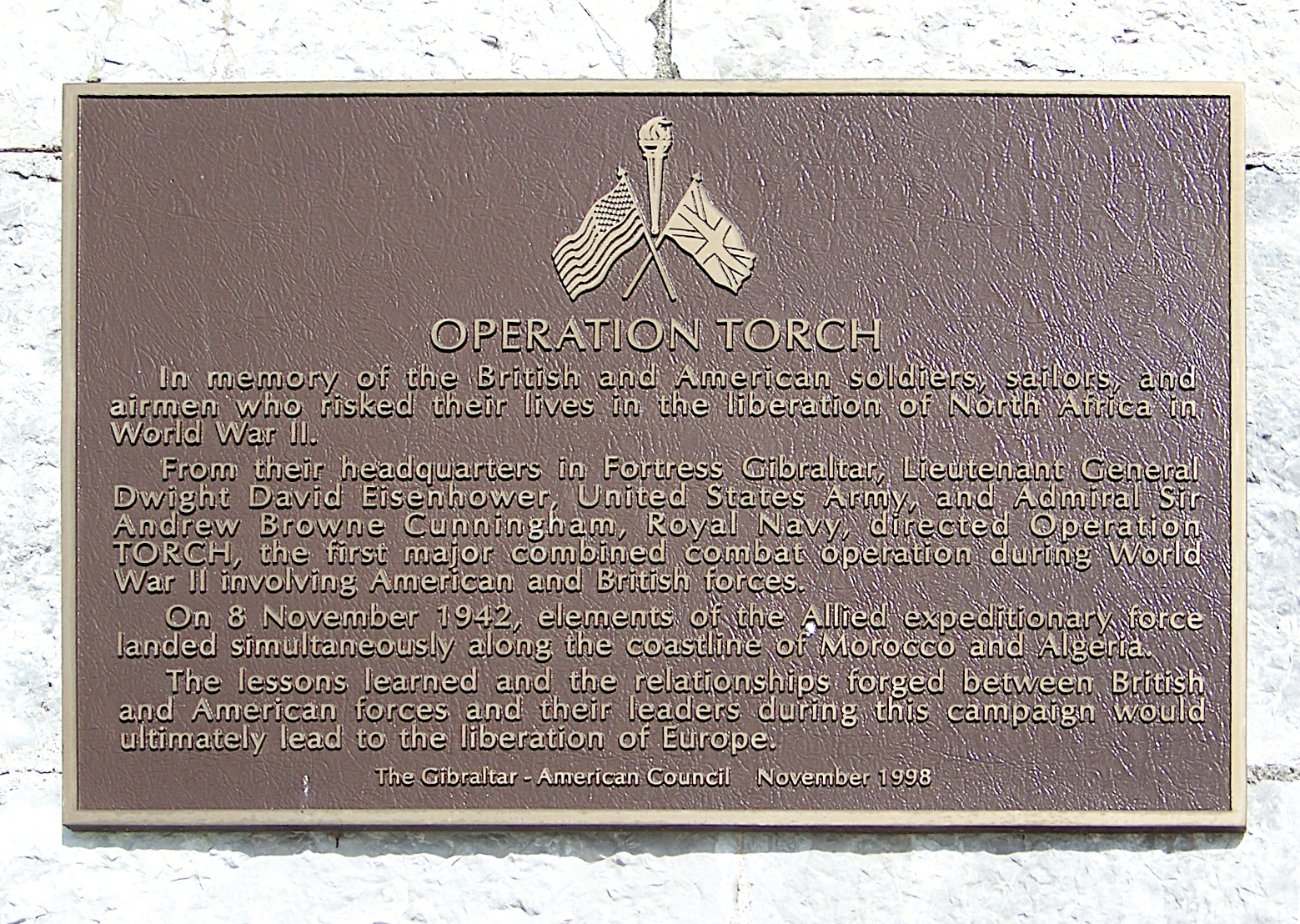
Plaque commemorating Operation Torch, Gibraltar.

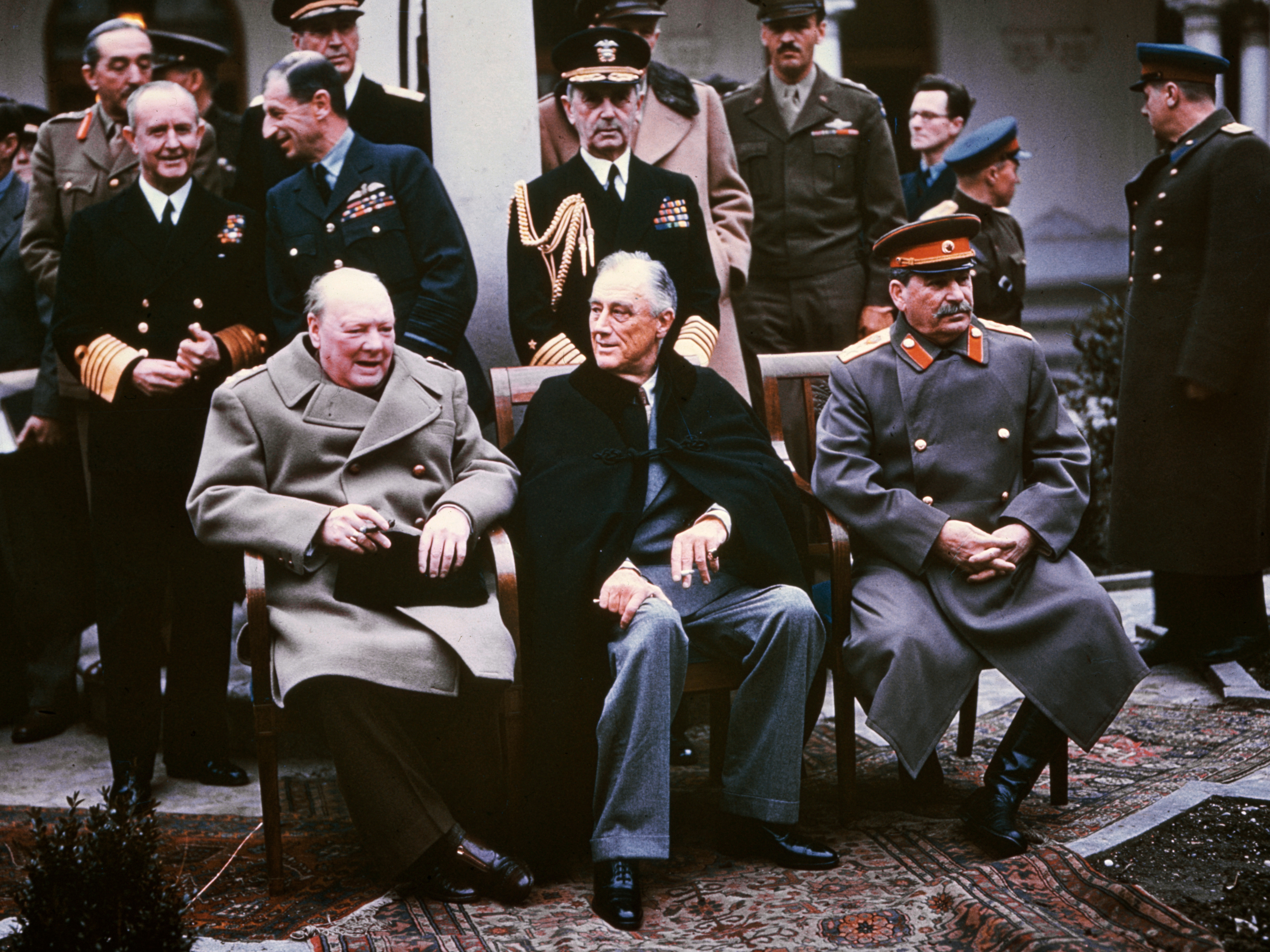
Cunningham standing behind Winston Churchill at the Yalta Conference.

Cunningham became a Knight Grand Cross of the Order of the Bath (GCB), "in recognition of the recent successful combined operations in the Middle East", in March 1941 and was created a baronet, of Bishop's Waltham in the County of Southampton, in July 1942. From late 1942 to early 1943, he served under General Dwight D. Eisenhower, who made him Naval Commander, Allied Expeditionary Force. In this role Cunningham commanded the large fleet that covered the Anglo-American landings in North Africa (Operation Torch). General Eisenhower said of him in his diary:

Admiral Sir Andrew Browne Cunningham. He remains in my opinion at the top of my subordinates in absolute selflessness, energy, devotion to duty, knowledge of his task, and in understanding of the requirements of allied operations. My opinions as to his superior qualifications have never wavered for a second.

On 21 January 1943, Cunningham was promoted to Admiral of the Fleet. February 1943 saw him return to his post as Commander-in-Chief, Mediterranean Fleet. Three months later, when Axis forces in North Africa were on the verge of surrender, he ordered that none should be allowed to escape. Entirely in keeping with his fiery character he signalled the fleet "Sink, burn and destroy: Let nothing pass". He oversaw the naval forces used in the joint Anglo-American amphibious invasions of Sicily, during Operation Husky, Operation Baytown and Operation Avalanche. On the morning of 11 September 1943, Cunningham was present at Malta when the Italian Fleet surrendered. Cunningham informed the Admiralty with a telegram; "Be pleased to inform their Lordships that the Italian battle fleet now lies at anchor under the guns of the fortress of Malta."

=== First Sea Lord (1943-1946) ===
In October 1943, Cunningham became First Sea Lord and Chief of the Naval Staff, after the death of Sir Dudley Pound. This promotion meant that he had to relinquish his coveted post of Commander-in-Chief, Mediterranean, recommending Admiral John H. D. Cunningham as his successor. In the position of First Sea Lord, and as a member of the Chiefs of Staff committee, Cunningham was responsible for the overall strategic direction of the navy for the remainder of the war. He attended the major conferences at Cairo, Tehran, Yalta and Potsdam, at which the Allies discussed future strategy, including the invasion of Normandy and the deployment of a British fleet to the Pacific Ocean.

While the port of Antwerp was vital for the Allies after D-Day, Admirals Cunningham and Ramsay warned SHAEF and Montgomery that the port was of no use while the Germans held the approaches. But Montgomery postponed the Battle of the Scheldt, and the delay in opening the port was a grave blow to the Allied build-up before winter approached.

== Retirement ==
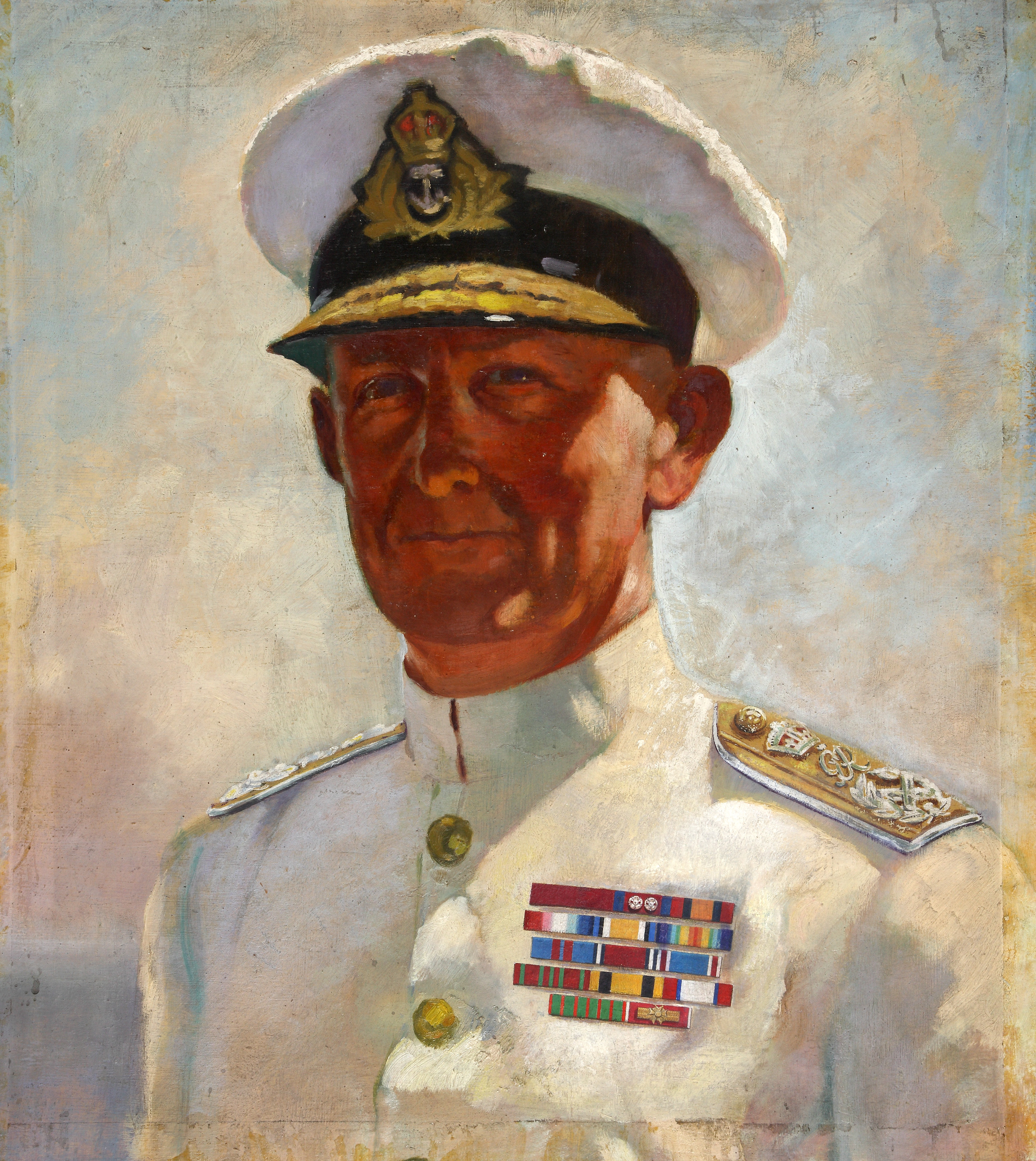
Portrait of Cunningham commissioned by the Ministry of Information in about 1943

In January 1945 Cunningham was appointed a Knight of the Thistle and raised to the peerage as Baron Cunningham of Hyndhope, of Kirkhope in the County of Selkirk. He was entitled to retire at the end of the war in 1945 but he resolved to pilot the Navy through the transition to peace before retiring. With the election of Clement Attlee as British Prime Minister in 1945, and the implementation of his Post-war consensus, there was a large reduction in the Defence Budget. The extensive reorganisation was a challenge for Cunningham. "We very soon came to realise how much easier it was to make war than to reorganise for peace." Due to pressures on the budget from all three services, the Navy embarked on a reduction programme that was larger than Cunningham had envisaged.

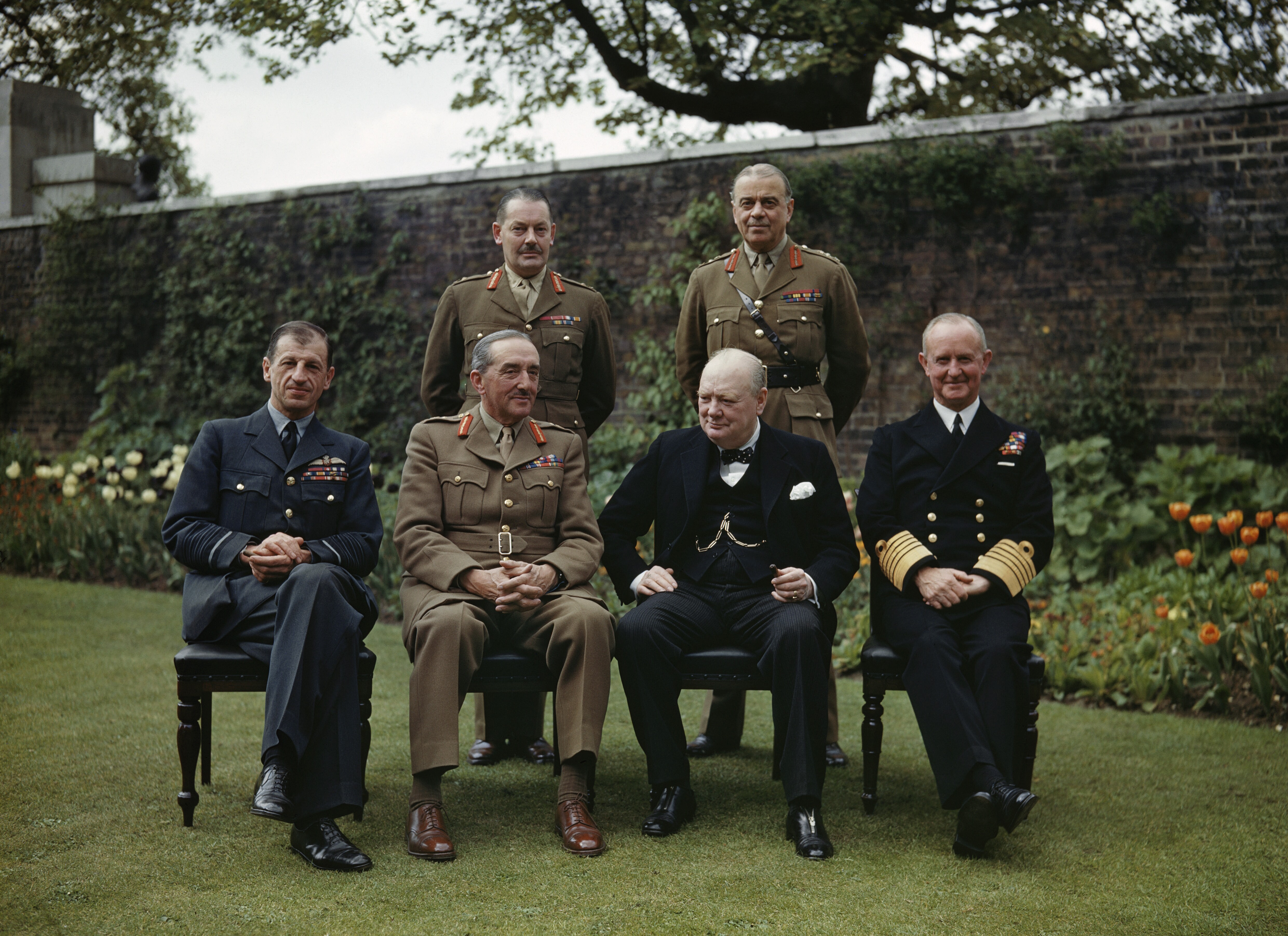
Winston Churchill with his Chiefs of Staff in the garden of 10 Downing Street, 7 May 1945. Seated, left to right: Air Chief Marshal Sir Charles Portal; Field Marshal Sir Alan Brooke; Winston Churchill; Admiral Sir Andrew Cunningham. Standing, left to right: Major-General L. C. Hollis; General Sir Hastings Ismay.

In October 1945, he was elected Rector of the University of Edinburgh. He was made Viscount Cunningham of Hyndhope, of Kirkhope in the County of Selkirk, in the 1946 New Year Honours, and appointed to the Order of Merit in June of that year. At the end of May 1946, after overseeing the transition through to peacetime, Cunningham retired from his post as First Sea Lord. Cunningham retreated to the "little house in the country", 'Palace House', at Bishop's Waltham in Hampshire, which he and Lady Cunningham had acquired before the war. They both had a busy retirement. He attended the House of Lords irregularly and occasionally lent his name to press statements about the Royal Navy, particularly those relating to Admiral Dudley North, who had been relieved of his command of Gibraltar in 1940. Cunningham, and several of the surviving admirals of the fleet, set about securing justice for North, and they succeeded with a partial vindication in 1957.

He busied himself with various appointments; he was Lord High Commissioner to the General Assembly of the Church of Scotland in 1950 and 1952, and in 1953 he acted as Lord High Steward at the coronation of Queen Elizabeth II. Throughout this time Cunningham and his wife entertained family and friends, including his own great nephew, Jock Slater, in their extensive gardens. Cunningham died in London on 12 June 1963, and was buried at sea off Portsmouth. There were no children from his marriage and his titles consequently became extinct on his death.

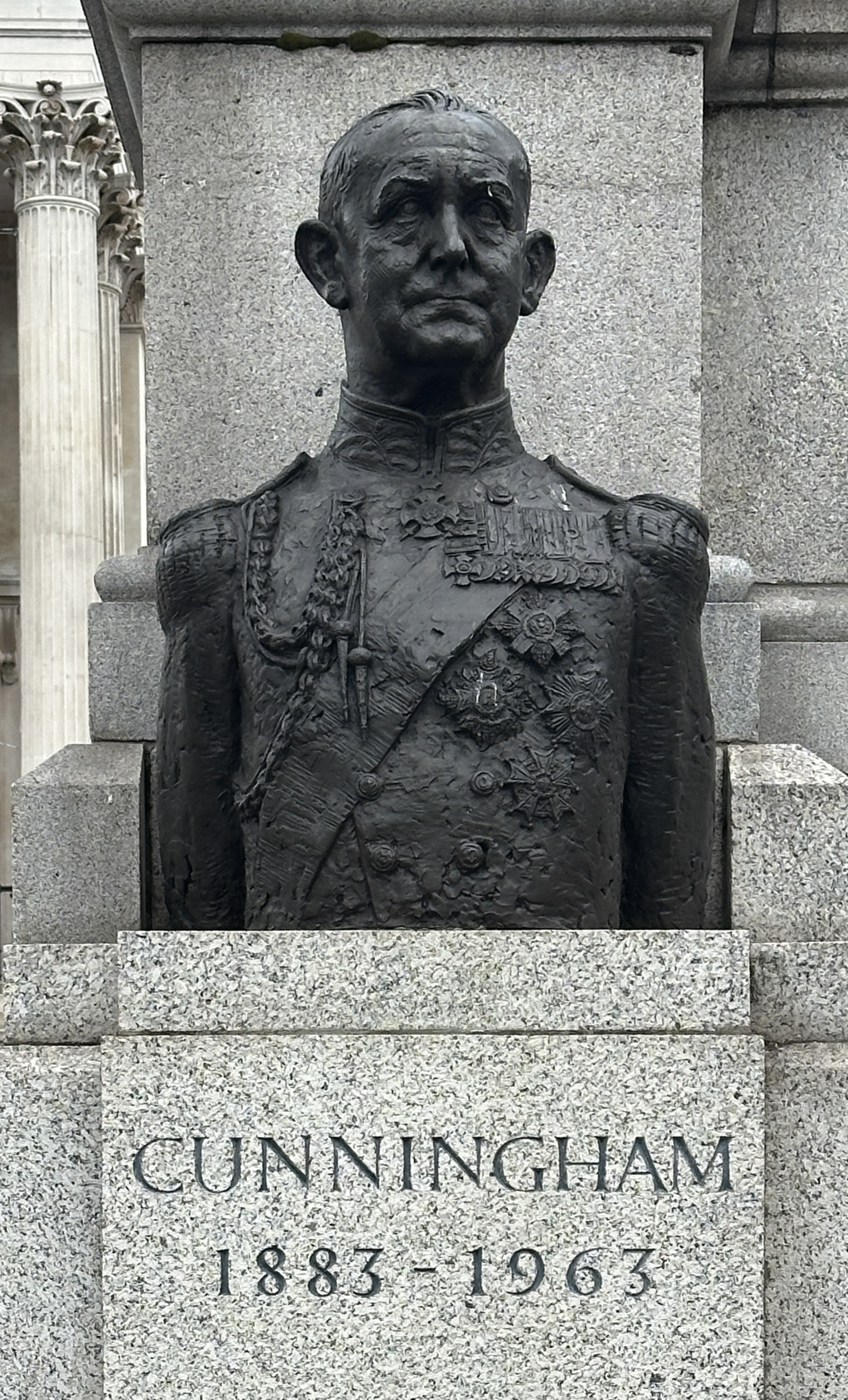
Bronze bust unveiled in Trafalgar Square on 2 April 1967 by Prince Philip, Duke of Edinburgh

A bust of Cunningham by Franta Belsky was unveiled in Trafalgar Square in London on 2 April 1967 by Prince Philip, Duke of Edinburgh.

The April 2010 UK naval operation to ship British military personnel and air passengers stranded in continental Europe by the air travel disruption after the 2010 Eyjafjallajökull eruption back to the UK was named Operation Cunningham after him.

== Arms ==
Coat of arms of Andrew Cunningham, 1st Viscount Cunningham of Hyndhope
Crest Issuant from a naval crown Vert a unicorn's head Argent armed maned and tufted Or langued Gules. Escutcheon Argent a shake-fork Sable between a mullet in chief Vert and two dolphins descending respectant of the last embouchee Gules. Supporters Two albatrosses their wings elevated Proper. Motto Over Fork Over

== Notes ==
Military offices
Preceded by Sir Geoffrey Blake	Commander, Battlecruiser Squadron; 1937–1938	Succeeded by Sir Geoffrey Layton
Preceded by Sir William James	Deputy Chief of Naval Staff; 1938–1939	Succeeded by Sir Tom Phillips
Preceded by Sir Dudley Pound	Commander-in-Chief, Mediterranean Fleet; 1939–1942	Succeeded by Sir Henry Harwood
Preceded by Sir Henry Harwood	Commander-in-Chief, Mediterranean Fleet; February–October 1943	Succeeded by Sir John Cunningham
Preceded by Sir Dudley Pound	First Sea Lord; 1943–1946	Succeeded by Sir John Cunningham
Court offices
Vacant Title last held by The Marquess of Salisbury	Lord High Steward; 1953	Vacant Title next held by Sir Gordon Messenger
Academic offices
Preceded by J. Donald Pollock	Rector of the University of Edinburgh; 1945–1948	Succeeded by Alastair Sim
Baronetage of the United Kingdom
New creation	Baronet (of Bishop's Waltham); 1942–1963	Extinct
Peerage of the United Kingdom
New creation	Viscount Cunningham of Hyndhope; 1946–1963	Extinct
New creation	Baron Cunningham of Hyndhope; 1945–1963	Extinct
