= Strategic Defence and Security Review 2010 =

United Kingdom Ministry of Defence defence review

The Strategic Defence and Security Review 2010 was announced by the formed Conservative-Liberal Democrat coalition government of the United Kingdom in May 2010, and published on 19 October 2010. The previous major review of UK defence strategy was the Strategic Defence Review, published in 1998, and updated in 2003 by the Delivering Security in a Changing World white paper.

As well as wanting an updated security policy, both the Conservatives and Liberal Democrats wanted the £38 billion overspend in the Ministry of Defence (MoD) procurement budget addressed. With the government committed to reducing the national budget deficit, the Treasury asked the MoD to draw up options for a 10–20% real-terms cut in its budget. The final amount was a 7.7% reduction over four years.

== Summary ==
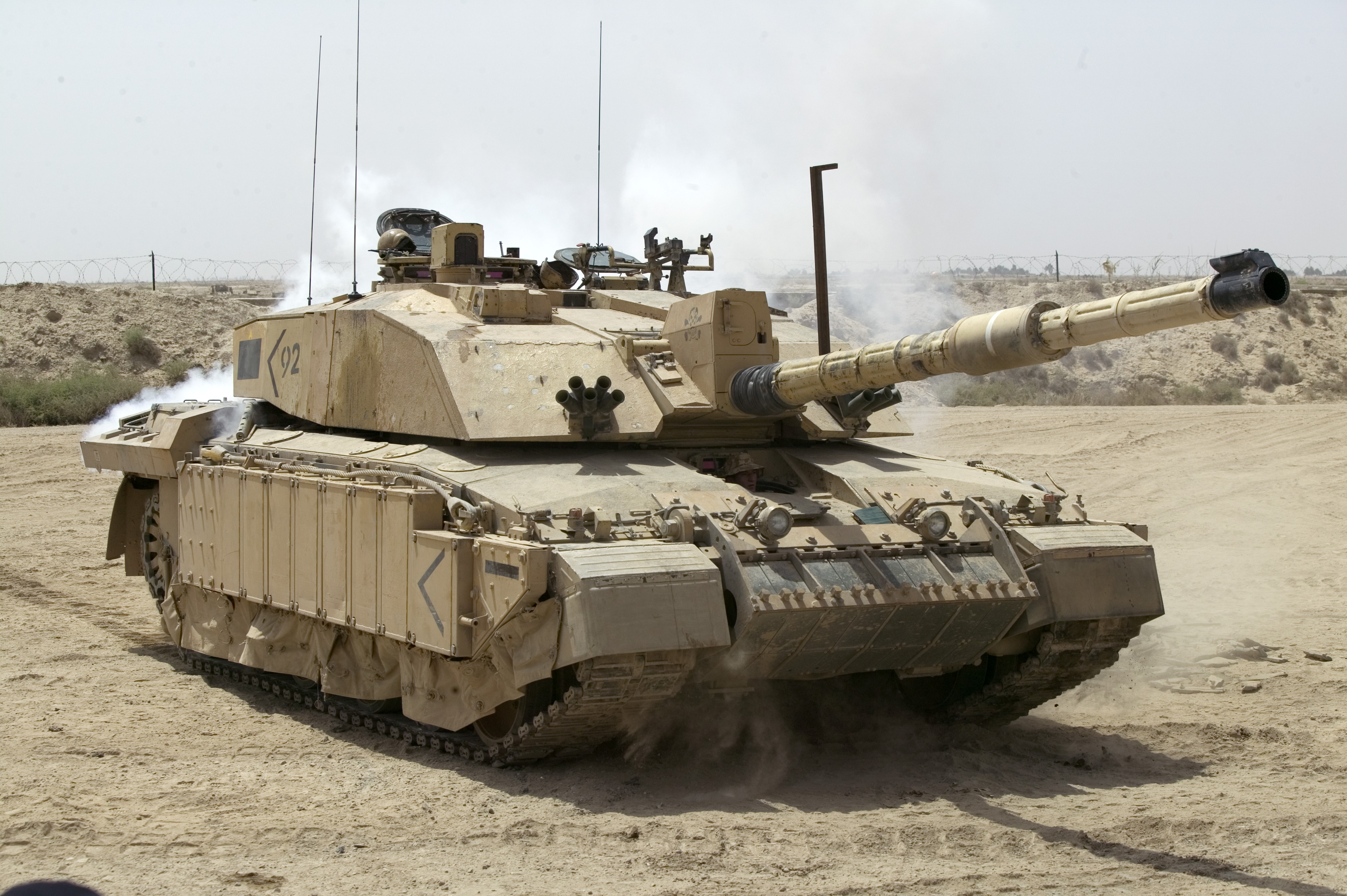
The number of Challenger 2 tanks would be cut by 40%.

All three of Britain's armed forces would take cuts in manpower. Overall, the largest overseas deployment was expected to be not more than 30,000 personnel, including maritime and air force units. This compares to the 45,000 involved in the 2003 invasion of Iraq. In November 2010, the MoD released its plan to implement the changes.

=== Royal Navy ===
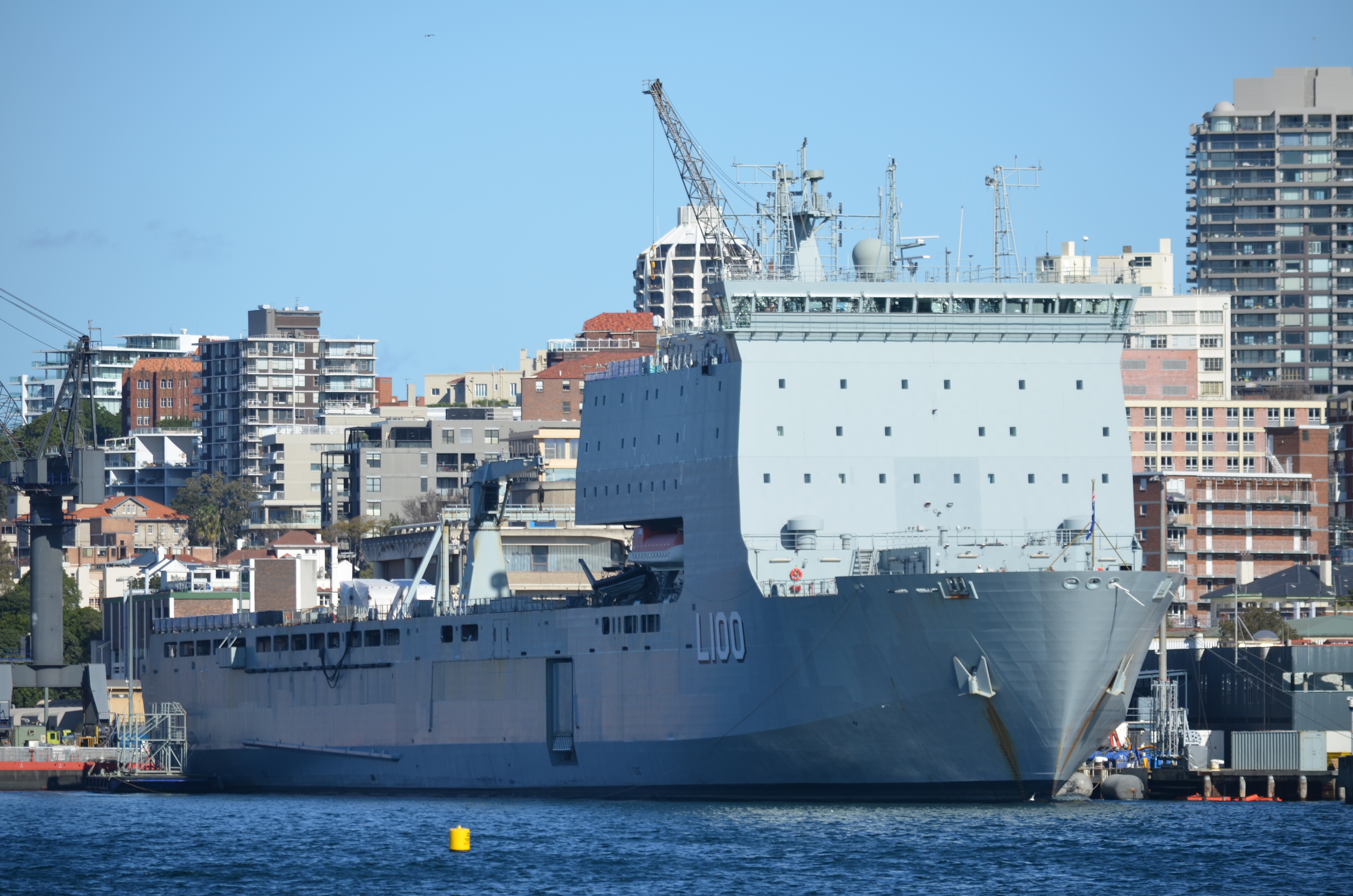
HMAS Choules, previously RFA Largs Bay, was sold to the Royal Australian Navy following the SDSR.

- Personnel to be reduced by 5,000 to 30,000.
- One of the Albion class landing platform dock ships to be in extended readiness at any given time. Later confirmed that HMS Albion would be put into extended readiness until 2016, and HMS Bulwark went into extended readiness thereafter.
- Either HMS Ocean or HMS Illustrious to be decommissioned, whichever is least capable as a helicopter carrier. It was announced in December 2010 that HMS Ocean would be retained and HMS Illustrious would be withdrawn from service in 2014.
- One of the Bay-class landing ship dock vessels would be decommissioned. The Bay-class landing dock RFA Largs Bay was subsequently sold to the Royal Australian Navy in January 2011 for £65 million.
- The number of warheads carried on each Vanguard-class submarine to be reduced from 48 to 40, and the number of operationally available nuclear warheads to be reduced from about 160 to no more than 120.
- The decision on replacement of the UK's nuclear deterrent, based on the Vanguard-class ballistic missile submarines, to be delayed by four years, deferring £500 million in spending. Changes to the size of the missile tubes to save £250 million.
- Seven Astute-class submarines to be built as planned.
- The surface fleet of frigates and destroyers to be reduced to 19 ships: the current 13 Type 23 frigates and the six active Type 45 destroyers. The remaining four Type 22 frigates: Cornwall (decommissioned 2011), Cumberland (2011), Campbeltown (2011), and Chatham (2011) and five Type 42 destroyers: Manchester (decommissioned 2011), Gloucester (2011), Liverpool (2012), York (2012), and Edinburgh (2013) would be disposed of. The plan also stated that "as soon as possible after 2020", the Type 23 frigates would be replaced by new Global Combat Ships.
- The Wildcat (Super Lynx) to be the main naval strike helicopter in the future, along with the Merlin.
- A UK Response Force Task Group to be established.

==== Carrier Strike ====
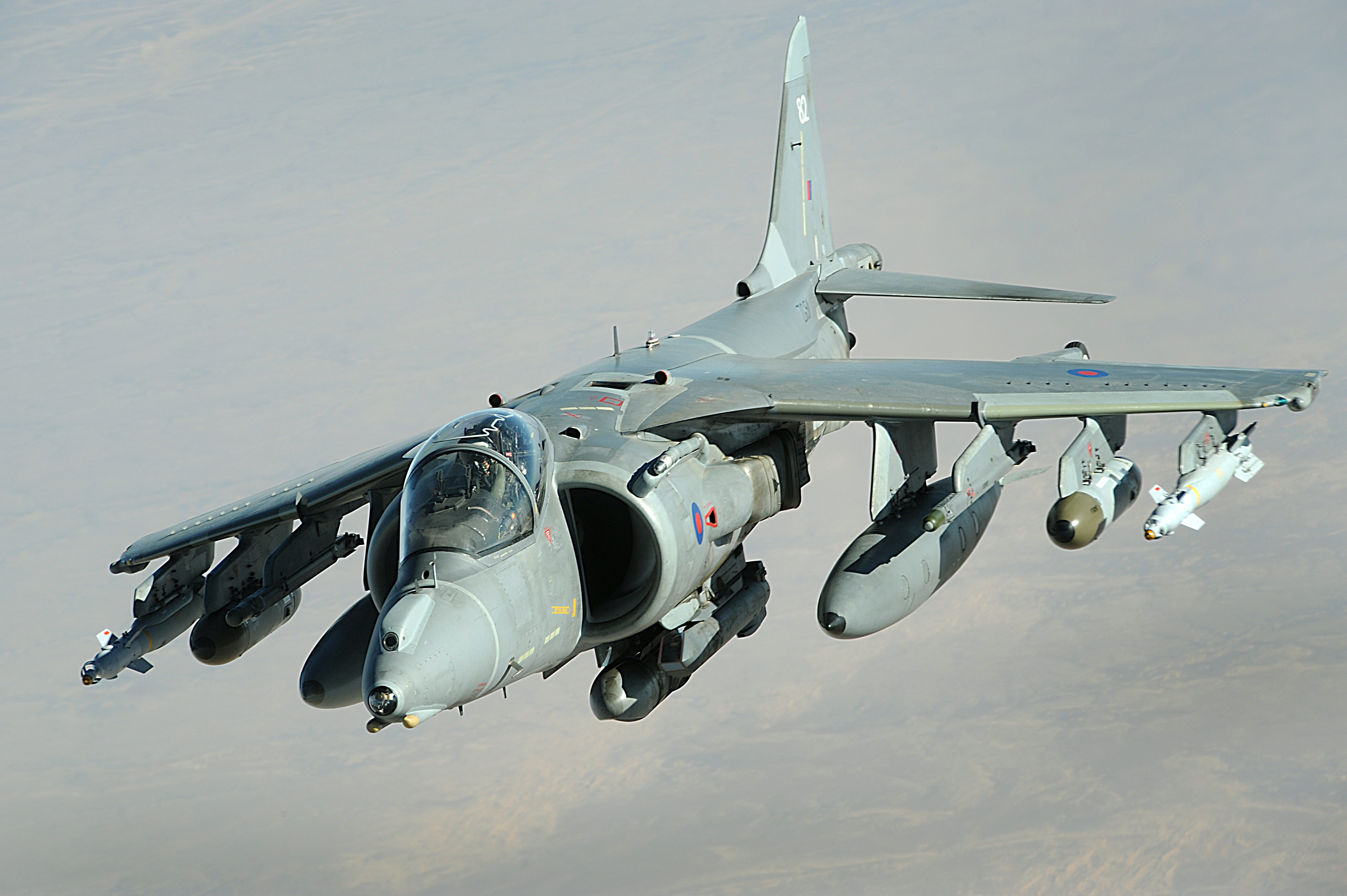
The Harrier GR9 was retired in order to maintain the Tornado as the RAF's main strike aircraft until the Typhoon matured. The latter and the Lockheed Martin F-35 Lightning II would constitute the RAF's fast jet fleet in the future.

The SDSR called for the almost immediate decommissioning of the Royal Navy flagship aircraft carrier, HMS Ark Royal, rather than in 2016 as scheduled. This occurred on 11 March 2011.

The Report also announced the early retirement of the Joint Force Harrier aircraft, the Harrier GR7/GR9. Both of these measures were to save money for the purchase of the Queen Elizabeth-class aircraft carriers. The Harrier fleet made its last operational flights in December 2010. In 2011 72 British Harriers were sold to the United States to be used for spares.

The SDSR proposed that one of the two Queen Elizabeth-class aircraft carriers currently under construction would be certain to be commissioned, with the fate of the other left undecided. It had been suggested that only one carrier, routinely equipped with 12 fast jets, was to be in service at any one time, with the other carrier held in extended readiness. These plans were to be reviewed in 2015. However, in May 2014 it was announced by Prime Minister David Cameron that the second carrier, Prince of Wales, would be brought into service alongside Queen Elizabeth. He confirmed the second vessel was already 40% built.

The SDSR announced the government's intention to switch its purchase of F-35Bs to the carrier-variant F-35C to allow for a wider range and weapons to be used. However, in May 2012 this decision was reversed, and the F-35B was chosen instead, as the previous government had intended. This was because the cost of converting the Queen Elizabeth-class aircraft carriers to accommodate the carrier-variant F-35C had risen to twice the original estimate.

=== British Army ===
- Personnel to be reduced by 7,000 to 95,500 by 2015. To take place within the overall mandate of reducing the army's size to 82,000 regular personnel and 30,000 reservists by 2018.
- The withdrawal of all 20,000 British troops from bases in Germany by 2020.
- The number of Challenger 2 tanks to be cut by 40% to just over 200.
- The number of AS-90 self-propelled heavy artillery guns to be cut by 35% to an estimated 87.

=== Royal Air Force ===
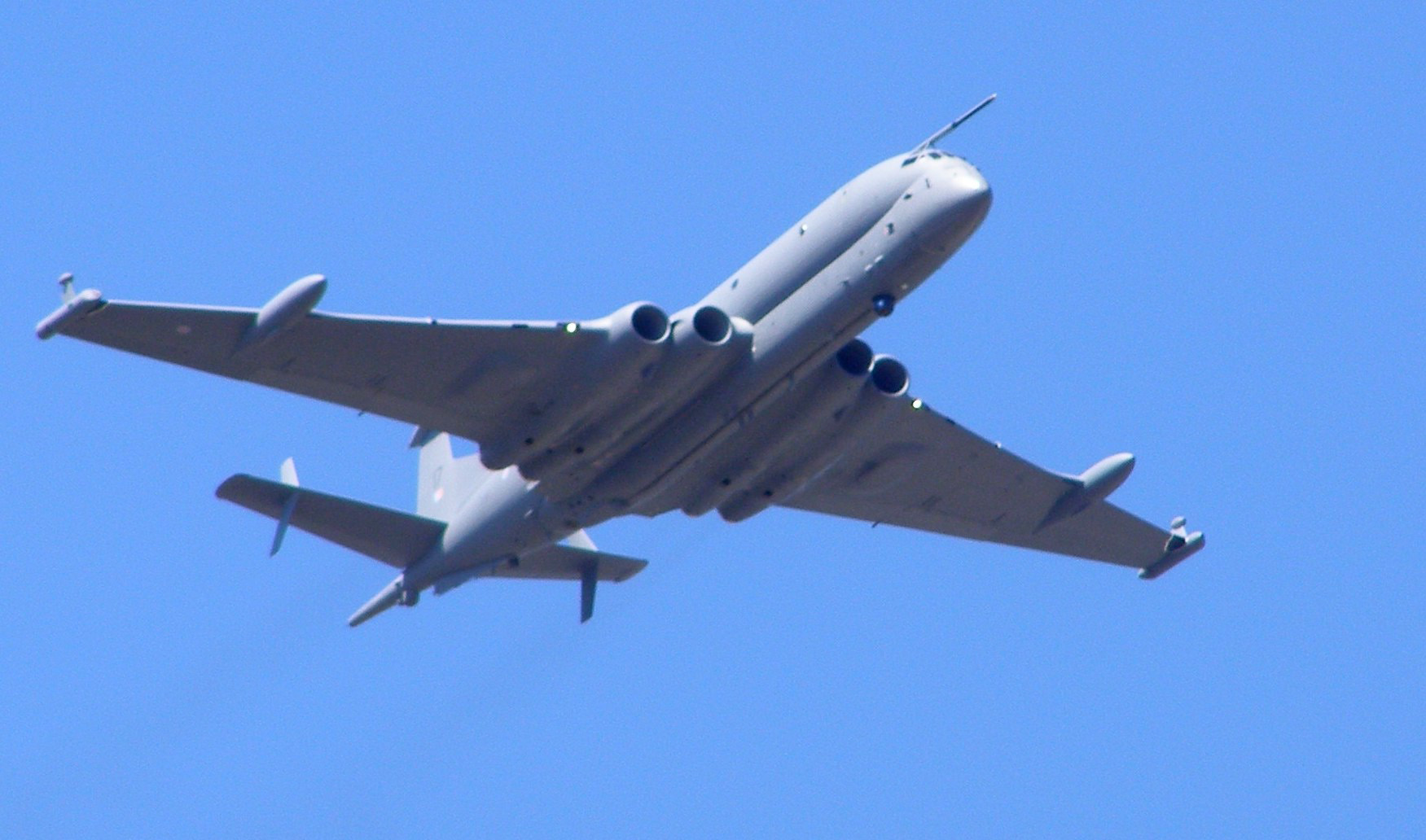
The Nimrod MRA4 was cancelled and all airframes scrapped.

- Personnel to be reduced by 5,000 to 33,000.
- After long delays, technical difficulties, and a total cost of £3.2 billion, the Nimrod MRA4 maritime patrol aircraft project was scrapped. RAF Kinloss, where the aircraft were to be based, ended its 73-year association with the RAF on 26 July 2012 when it was transferred to the Army.
- Future Strategic Tanker Aircraft procurement to go ahead, to replace the ageing VC10 and TriStars. The VC10 made its final flight in RAF service on 20 September 2013.
- The purchase of 22 Airbus A400M military transport aircraft was confirmed, with the aircraft to operate alongside the RAF's eight C-17s.
- The C-130J fleet to be retired by 2022, ten years earlier than planned.
- The proposed purchase of 12 additional Chinook helicopters – a cut to the original order for 22. However, in 2011 the Ministry of Defence signed a contract for 14 Chinooks.
- The RAF's future fast-jet fleet to be based on the Typhoon and the Lockheed Martin F-35 Lightning II, with the latter also to be flown by the Royal Navy.
- The Sentinel R1 ground surveillance aircraft would be retired when it was no longer required to support forces in Afghanistan. The utility of the aircraft in deployments over Libya and Mali has led to some calls for the retention of the aircraft.

== Criticism ==
On 3 August 2011, the House of Commons Defence Select Committee published a critical review of the SDSR. The review had led to wide-ranging cuts to the Armed Forces, which were widely criticised for damaging the capabilities of the British military. The review was subsequently criticized for leaving Britain unprepared in a changing international environment, particularly in relation to its ability to retain trained personnel. In 2018, a report by the National Audit Office found that the numbers of trained regulars had fallen from some 180,000 personnel in 2010 to fewer than 140,000 in 2017/18. The numbers in 2017/18 were some 8,200 people below the stated requirement. In 2015, the House of Commons defence committee again concluded that “The UK’s current defence assumptions are not sufficient for [the] changed environment ... Now there is a requirement to support stability in a dozen different theatres simultaneously, and to engage with both unconventional and conventional threats.”

== See also ==
- Military of the United Kingdom
- Strategic Defence and Security Review 2015
