= HMS Indomitable =

Two warships of the Royal Navy have borne the name HMS Indomitable:

- HMS Indomitable (1907) was the first battlecruiser in the world, beating sister ship HMS Inflexible by four months. She was launched in 1907 and scrapped in 1922.
- HMS Indomitable (92) was an Illustrious-class armoured fleet aircraft carrier launched in 1940. She served in the Second World War and was scrapped in 1955.
- HMS Indomitable was to have been an Invincible-class aircraft carrier. She was renamed HMS Ark Royal in 1978, before being launched in 1980.

== Battle honours ==
- Dogger Bank, 1915
- Jutland, 1916
- Malta Convoys 1942
- Diego Suarez 1942
- Sicily 1943
- Palembang 1945
- Okinawa 1945

== In popular culture ==
- In early drafts of Herman Melville's novel Billy Budd, HMS Bellipotent was to have been named Indomitable. This title was used in Benjamin Britten's adaptation of the novel as an opera.

== See also ==
- Indomitable (disambiguation)
