= Leaders (band) =

Former American Christian metal band

- Also known as: All or Nothing
- Origin: Hollister, California
- Genres: Christian metal, metalcore
- Years active: 2011–2015
- Labels: Facedown
- Members: Lazarus Rios
- Website: facebook.com/leadersmetal

Leaders were an American Christian metal band from Hollister, California. The band started making music in 2011, with members, lead vocalist, Lazarus Rios, lead guitarist, Alfredo Tovar, bass guitarist, JC Villareal, and drummer, Elijah Martinez. They signed with Facedown Records, where they released, Now We Are Free, a studio album, in 2012. Their second album, Indomitable, released by Facedown Records in 2013. Leaders disbanded on June 27, 2015.

== Members ==
Final Lineup

- Lazarus Rios - vocals (2011-2015)
- Josh Reeves - guitar (2013-2015)
- Jake Dirkson - bass (2013-2015)
- Johnathen Somner - drums (2013-2015)

Former

- Sam Campagna - guitar (2011)
- Alfie Tovar - guitar (2011-2013)
- J.C Villarreal- bass (2011-2013)
- Elijah Martinez- drums (2011-2013)

== Discography ==
Studio albums

- Now We Are Free (March 27, 2012, Facedown)
- Indomitable (September 3, 2013, Facedown)
