= Operation Phillis =

Date	12 November 2004
Location	Ivory Coast

Belligerents
- British Armed Forces

Operation Phillis was the British service-assisted evacuation operation for British citizens in Côte d'Ivoire in November 2004. It was put into effect on 11 November of that year in response to the Civil war in Côte d'Ivoire. A company of the Royal Gurkha Rifles was initially deployed to neighbouring Ghana, Royal Air Force transport aircraft were put on standby and HMS Albion was also directed towards the area to assist. Later troops of the 2nd Battalion, The Parachute Regiment were placed on standby to move to the area if reinforcements were needed.

On 12 November the evacuation began to proceed as two RAF Hercules and a C17 Globemaster aircraft flew evacuees to Ghana, with 120 Ghurkas escorting the evacuees from Abidjan to the airport and then forming a perimeter as the aircraft took off. 50 hours after it began the operation was complete, with 300 people evacuated including the British ambassador David Coates, and his staff. No British military or civilian casualties occurred during the operation.
