= Now We Are Free =

Studio album by Leaders
- Released: March 27, 2012
- Genre: Christian metal, metalcore
- Length: 28:29
- Label: Facedown
- Producer: Leaders, Zack Ohren

Leaders chronology
Now We Are Free (2012)	Indomitable (2013)

Now We Are Free is the first studio album from Leaders. Facedown Records released the album on March 27, 2012. Leaders worked with Zack Ohren, in the production of this album.

== Critical reception ==
Professional ratings
Review scores
Source	Rating
Christ Core	3.5/5 stars
Cross Rhythms	8/10 squares
HM Magazine	3.5/5 stars
Indie Vision Music	3/5 stars
Jesus Freak Hideout	3/5 stars
The New Review	4/5 stars

Awarding the album three and a half stars for HM Magazine, Rob Shameless states, "With heavy breakdowns and eerie leads, along with an anthem of liberation, this is a great record to give you a taste of what Facedown has up their sleeve for 2012." Christian Cunningham, giving the album an eight out of ten at Cross Rhythms, writes, "Rather refreshingly, the breakdowns, whilst still liberally spattered across the entirety of the record, manage to sound unique and varied and yet still retain that quintessential hardcore sound, avoiding the recycled riff déjà-vu of so many modern hardcore bands."

Giving the album three stars from Jesus Freak Hideout, Cortney Warner says, "For a band's debut album, Now We Are Free isn't a bad start, but Leaders will have to step up their game the next time around in order to keep up with their contemporaries." Brody Barbour, awarding the album three stars for Indie Vision Music, writes, "Leaders provides a great blend of old and new hardcore sounds, creating a massive wall of groove, that is sure to have anyone bobbing their heads at the least. 'Now We Are Free' is a solid debut album on their new home and is bound to find them a broader audience."

Indicating in a three and a half star review from Christ Core, Brian Morrissette describes, "On Now We Are Free Leaders show that they know how to craft superb hardcore music. Nothing is really groundbreaking on this album though. The vocals sound like the rest of the pack of hardcore bands out there. The production is professional enough that is gives them a small edge on the other bands in this genre." Lee Rochester, signaling in a four star review by The New Review, states, "Now We Are Free is an uncompromising and unapologetic blow to both your psyche and your senses."

== Track listing ==
All tracks are written by Leaders.

No.	Title	Length
1.	"Overture"	1:15
2.	"Conviction"	3:21
3.	"Instance"	3:17
4.	"Deportes"	3:16
5.	"Send Up"	1:41
6.	"Te Necesito"	1:48
7.	"Leaders"	3:45
8.	"Real"	2:09
9.	"Alone"	3:44
10.	"La Onda"	4:13
Total length:		28:29
