= Operation Cunningham =

Operation Cunningham was a naval operation in April 2010 by units of the Royal Navy of the United Kingdom to ship British military personnel and air passengers stranded in continental Europe by the air travel disruption after the 2010 Eyjafjallajökull eruption. The amphibious warfare ships HMS Albion and HMS Ocean and the aircraft carrier HMS Ark Royal were assigned to the operation, which was named after the Second World War British admiral Andrew Cunningham. However, only Albion was directly involved in the repatriation effort.

== By ship ==
=== Albion ===
Albion was assigned to collect 200 soldiers from 3rd Battalion, The Rifles from Santander, and to fill the remaining space aboard with passengers, arriving on the morning of 20 April.

=== Ocean ===
Ocean sailed from her Devonport base on 19 April, being on readiness in the Channel from 20 April.

=== Ark Royal ===
HMS Ark Royal was detached from NATO Exercise Joint Warrior off north-west Scotland (also affected by the grounding of aircraft), reaching the south coast of England on 20 April and sailing from HMNB Portsmouth to join Ocean in the Channel later that day.

However due to two leaks, she was stood down and returned to HMNB Portsmouth for a dry dock repair, with her ammunition still embarked.

== See also ==
- Aftermath of the 2010 Eyjafjallajökull eruption
- Dunkirk evacuation
