= Trinity School, Teignmouth =

Trinity School
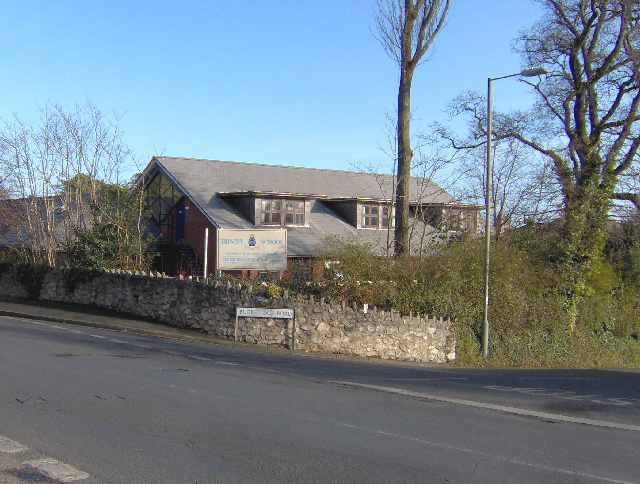

Location
- Buckeridge Road; Teignmouth, Devon, TQ14 8LY; 50.556088°N 3.500669°W

Information
- Type: Independent School
- Motto: Optimism. Confidence. Charity.
- Established: 1979
- Department for Education URN: 113574. Tables
- Chair of Governors: Simon Brookman
- Headmistress: Mrs Unsworth
- Gender: Coeducational
- Age: 3 to 19
- Enrolment: 350
- Website: www.trinityschool.co.uk

Trinity School is a non-selective, co-educational, day and boarding school in Teignmouth, Devon for children aged 3–19. The school was founded in 1979 as a joint Roman Catholic and Anglican school.
