= HMS Ark Royal (R07) =

1985 Invincible-class light aircraft carrier

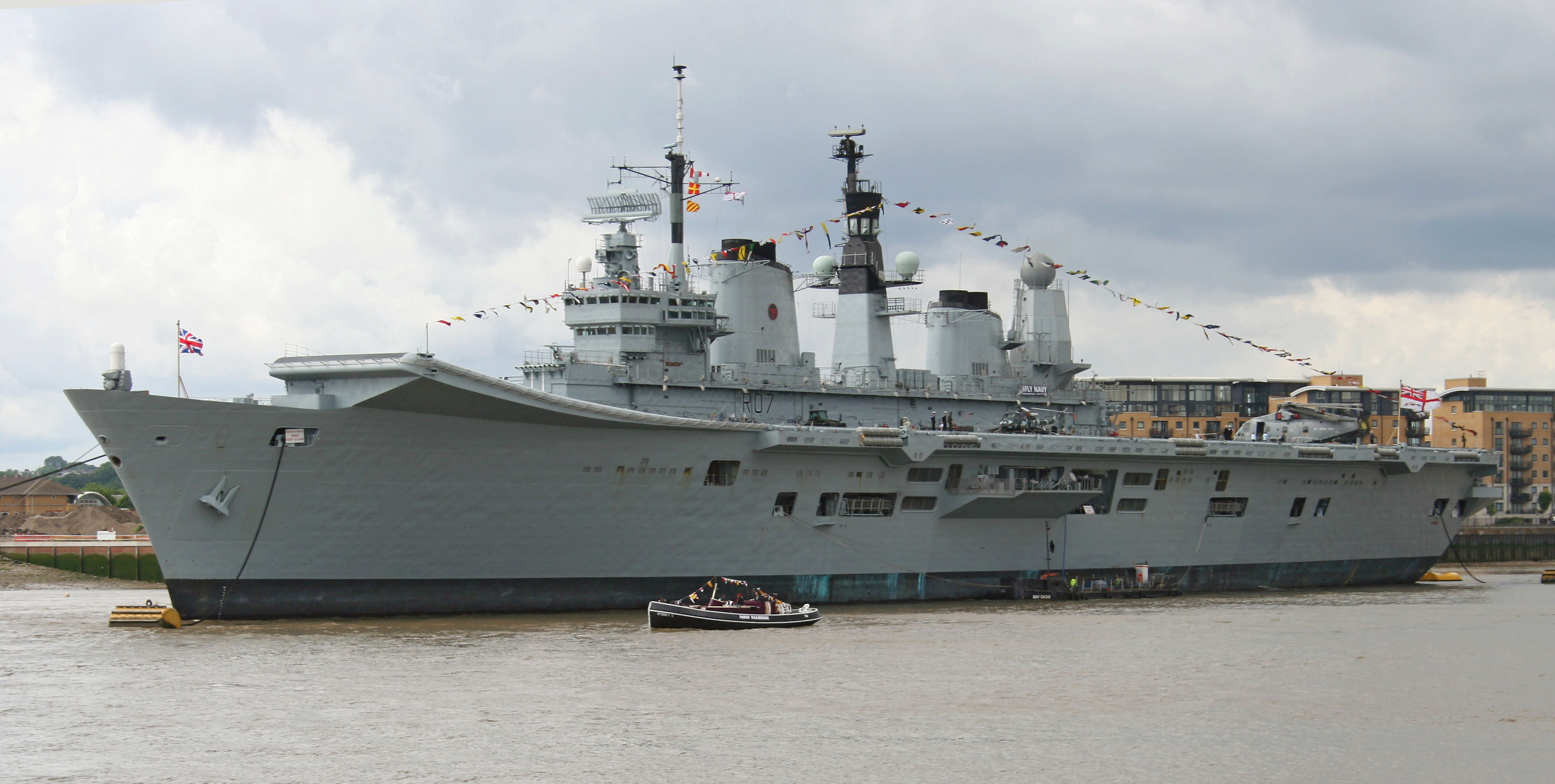
- HMS Ark Royal alongside at Portsmouth in 2007

History

United Kingdom
- Name: Ark Royal
- Namesake: The 1587 flagship that defeated the Spanish Armada in 1588, Ark Royal
- Ordered: December 1978
- Builder: Swan Hunter, Tyne and Wear, United Kingdom
- Laid down: 14 December 1978
- Launched: 2 June 1981
- Sponsored by: Queen Elizabeth the Queen Mother
- Commissioned: 1 November 1985
- Decommissioned: 11 March 2011
- Refit: First Major 1999–2001; Second Major 2004–2007
- Home port: HMNB Portsmouth
- Identification: IMO number: 8949575; Pennant number: R07; International Callsign: GCDG; Deck code: R
- Motto: Zeal Does Not Rest
- Nickname(s): The Mighty Ark
- Honours and awards: Al Faw 2003
- Fate: Scrapped 2013
- Badge

General characteristics
- Class & type: Invincible-class aircraft carrier
- Displacement: 22,000 tons
- Length: 210 m (689.0 ft) (689 ft)
- Beam: 36 m (118.1 ft)
- Draught: 7.5 m (24.6 ft)
- Propulsion: 4 × Rolls-Royce Olympus TM3B gas turbines providing 97,000 hp (72,333 kW); 8 Paxman Valenta diesel generators.
- Speed: 28 knots (52 km/h; 32 mph)+
- Range: 5,000 nmi (9,300 km; 5,800 mi) at 18 knots (33 km/h; 21 mph)
- Complement: 685 crew; 366 Fleet Air Arm
- Armament: 3 × Mark 15 Phalanx CIWS; 2 × GAM-B01 20 mm guns
- Aircraft carried: Until December 2010, 22 aircraft; Multi Mission - Strike, ASuW and ASW; 12 x Harrier GR.7/9; 10 x Sea King ASaC and Merlin HM Mk.1 helicopters; Multi Mission - Strike and ASuW; 18 x Harrier GR.7/9; 4 x Sea King ASaC and Merlin HM Mk.1 helicopters

HMS Ark Royal was a light aircraft carrier and former flagship of the Royal Navy. She was the third and final vessel of the Invincible class. She was built by Swan Hunter on the River Tyne and launched by them in 1981. Ark Royal was christened by Queen Elizabeth the Queen Mother. She followed sister ships HMS Invincible and HMS Illustrious into service in 1985.

Affectionately known as The Mighty Ark, she is the fifth Royal Navy ship to have borne the name of the 1587 flagship that defeated the Spanish Armada in 1588. Originally intended to be named Indomitable to match the rest of the class, this was changed due to the public reaction to the loss of the Ark Royal name after the scrapping of the previous Ark Royal in 1980, after 30 years' service.

Slightly larger than her sister ships, and with a steeper ski-jump ramp, Ark Royal carried the STOVL (short take off and vertical landing) Harrier jump jet aircraft, as well as various helicopters. With a crew complement of over 1,000 sailors and aviators, she saw active service in the 1990s Bosnian War and the 2003 Invasion of Iraq.

Originally due to be retired in 2016, Ark Royal was instead decommissioned on 11 March 2011, as part of the Navy restructuring portion of the 2010 Strategic Defence and Security Review. After Ark Royal's decommissioning, HMS Albion replaced her as the Royal Navy flagship. Ark Royal was sold for scrap to the Turkish company Leyal Ship Recycling and left Portsmouth in May 2013.

== Construction ==
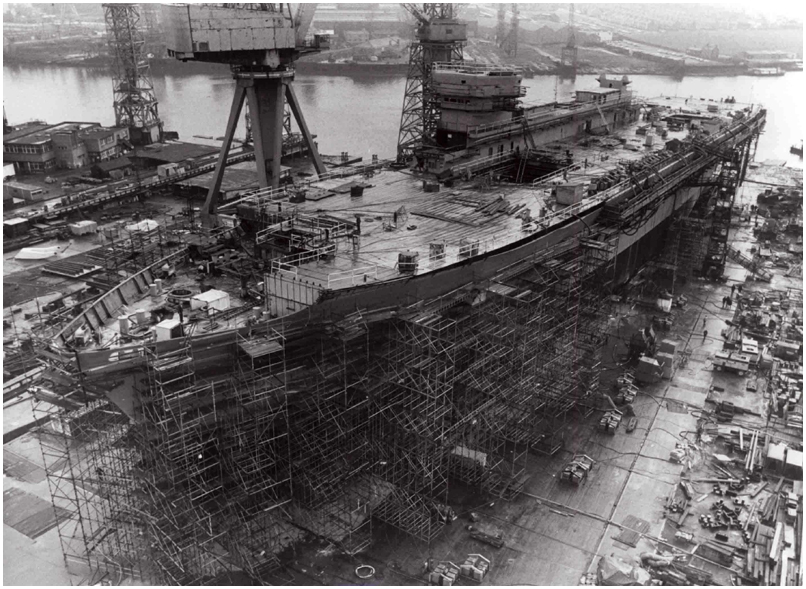
HMS Ark Royal at Wallsend during construction, 10 March 1981

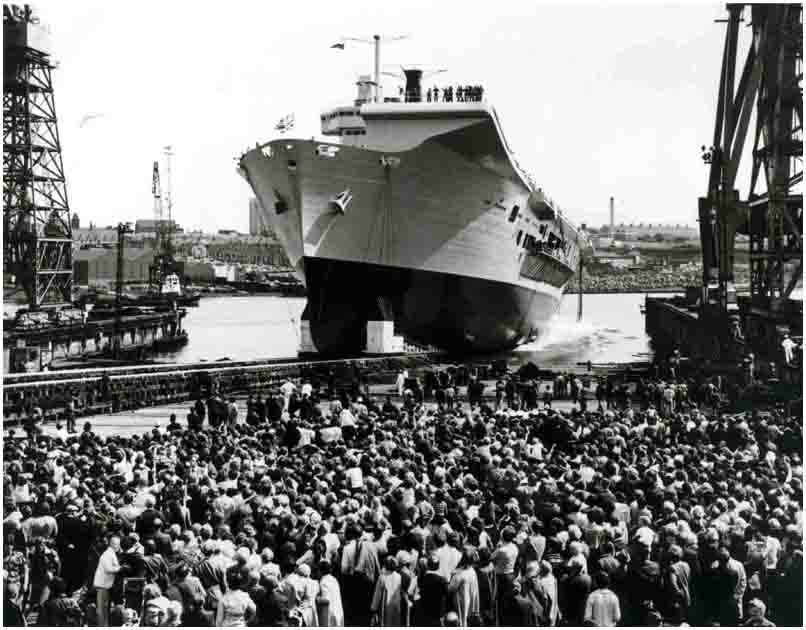
HMS Ark Royal being launched on 2 June 1981.

The aircraft carrier's keel was laid by Swan Hunter at Wallsend on 7 December 1978. She was launched on 2 June 1981 sponsored by The Queen Mother and commissioned on 1 November 1985. Originally intended as Indomitable in line with her sister ships Invincible and Illustrious, public resentment at the scrapping of the previous Ark Royal (the UK's last large aircraft carrier up to that date) in 1980 led the Royal Navy to announce that the name would be revived on the new ship. The unfinished Ark Royal was reportedly offered for sale to the Royal Australian Navy in 1981. HMS Invincible was later offered for sale instead.

== Operational history ==
=== 1990–1999 ===
Ark Royal was deployed in 1993 to the Adriatic Sea during the Bosnian War under the command of Captain Terry Loughran RN (later rear admiral). In May 1999, she was put into Rosyth for refitting, which included the removal of the Sea Dart surface-to-air missiles and covering over of the foredeck to allow for an enlarged deck park for aircraft.

=== 2000–2009 ===
She was recommissioned on 22 November 2001 by Queen Elizabeth the Queen Mother. She sailed to the Persian Gulf for the 2003 Invasion of Iraq. She was commanded by Captain Alan Massey (later Vice Admiral and Second Sea Lord) and sailed with a complement consisting of helicopters alone rather than her usual mix of helicopters and Harrier aircraft. During one of the operations in the war, two Westland Sea King helicopters from 849 Naval Air Squadron collided with each other in mid-air, resulting in the loss of six British and one American. Her deployment to the gulf was filmed throughout by Shine TV for a Channel 5 documentary entitled 'Ark Royal'.

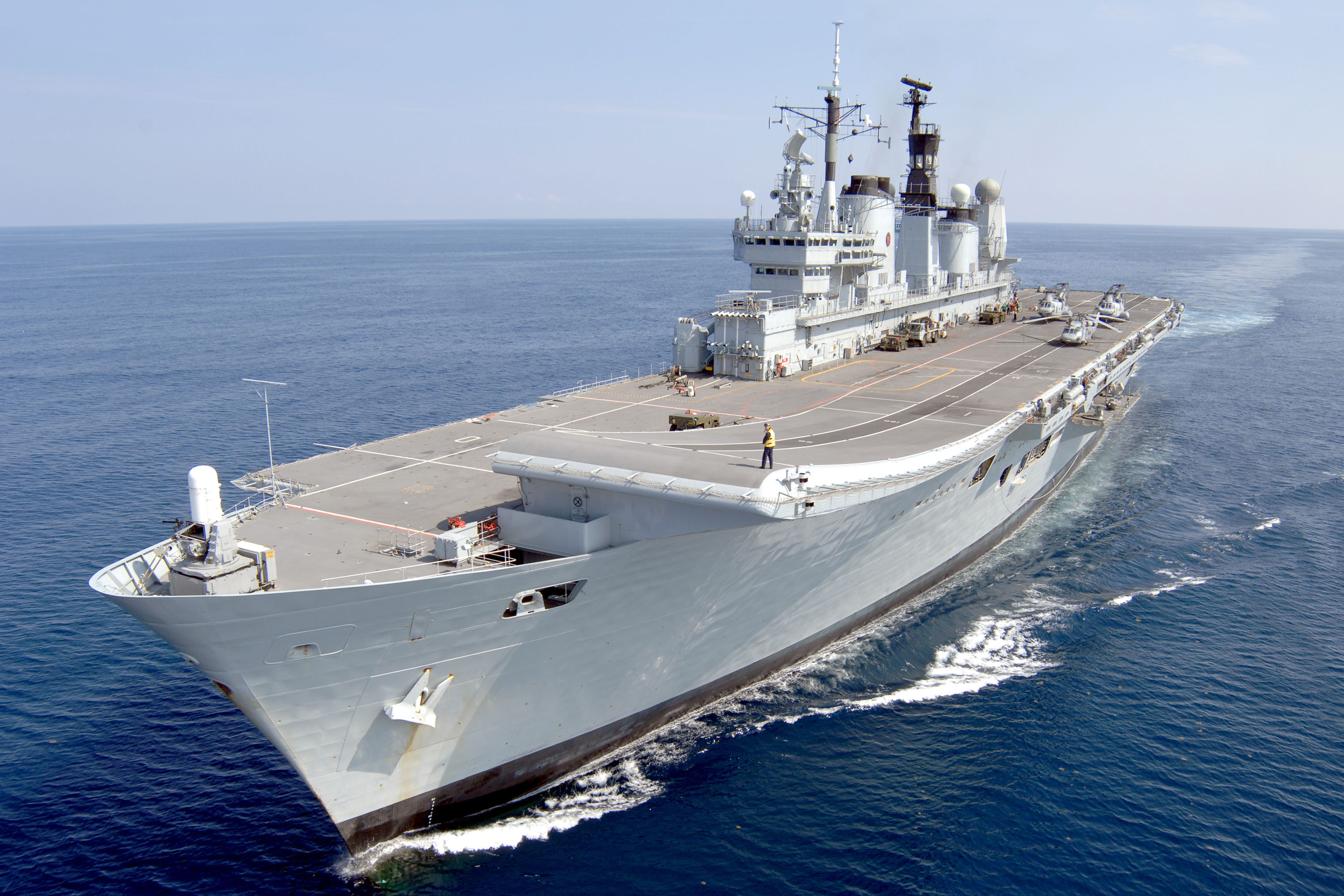
HMS Ark Royal participating during an Amphibious Exercise off the Eastern coast of the United States in 2008

In April 2004, Ark Royal entered into extended readiness, following which she entered refit with the Illustrious returning to service. Once her refit was completed, she received a new captain (Captain Mike Mansergh) in August 2006. Ark Royal then returned to Portsmouth to rejoin the fleet on 28 October 2006, where she underwent ten weeks of training and sea trials before being utilised as a landing platform helicopter, replacing Ocean while she underwent a refit. On 16 November 2006, a British Army WAH-64 Apache attack helicopter landed on Ark Royal for the first time marking an increase in the carrier's capability.

On 22 March 2007, Ark Royal was returned to the Royal Navy Fleet after a two-year refit worth £18 million. In May 2007, she once again became the Fleet Flagship, reclaiming the title from her sister ship, Illustrious, which had been flagship since the end of her refit in 2005. On 31 July 2008, Mansergh was relieved as captain by Captain John Clink. In October 2008, Ark Royal was a participant in Exercise Joint Warrior 08-2. In January 2009, Ark Royal visited Liverpool and then the River Tyne, where she was built. Her voyage from Portsmouth to Liverpool was made with 108 Cadets from the Sea Cadet Corps and the Combined Cadet Force embarked.

=== 2010–2011 ===
During the air travel disruption after the 2010 Eyjafjallajökull eruption, the then Prime Minister, Gordon Brown, assigned Ark Royal and Ocean to rescue stranded travellers across the English Channel in Operation Cunningham. In June 2010, Ark Royal was in Halifax, Nova Scotia, to take part in the Royal Canadian Navy Centennial Celebrations, where she was visited by Prime Minister David Cameron on his way to the G20 summit in Toronto. During this time, an V-22 Osprey visited the ship, again increasing its capabilities.

On 19 October 2010, BBC News reported that the ship was to be decommissioned and scrapped earlier than expected, as part of the coalition government's spending review, and that an 8% cut to the British defence budget was expected to be announced later that week, only to be replaced in the long run with HMS Prince of Wales. A campaign was begun in November 2010 to retain the name Ark Royal for one of the new carriers. On 3 December 2010, the amphibious warfare ship HMS Albion was announced as Ark Royal's successor as the Royal Navy's flagship. In recognition of the ship's decommissioning, Portsmouth F.C. added the ship's motto to its 2011/12 season kit.

On the evening of 19 October, the ship arrived at Portsmouth ready to be decommissioned and laid up. On 5 November she was visited by Queen Elizabeth at Portsmouth before sailing to Loch Long for the removal of all her munitions. She then left the River Clyde on 17 November on her final voyage before decommissioning, visiting North Shields on 18–22 November and Hamburg for five days from 25 November. The latter was her last overseas visit, repeating a previous one in 2007. During the voyage, she launched four Harrier GR9s for the last time in the North Sea on 24 November.

Final air wing 2010
Squadron	Aircraft type	Number of aircraft	Role
800 NAS	Harrier GR9	4	Strike
1 Sqn	Harrier GR9	4	Strike
814 NAS	Merlin HM1	7	Anti-Submarine Warfare
854 NAS	Sea King ASaC7	3	Airborne Surveillance and Control

The ship then sailed from Hamburg back into Portsmouth, arriving at 9.40 am on 3 December 2010 flying a decommissioning pennant. A Harrier flypast to mark the occasion was planned, but was postponed due to bad weather. A farewell parade by her captain and crew was held in Guildhall Square in Portsmouth on 22 January 2011 and another in Leeds, the latter being a Freedom of the City parade. Her formal decommissioning occurred at Portsmouth on 11 March 2011. She was then to have sailed to Rosyth or Govan, but was instead de-stored at Portsmouth in late March after her decommissioning, with her last crew members leaving her by 25 May.

== Disposal ==
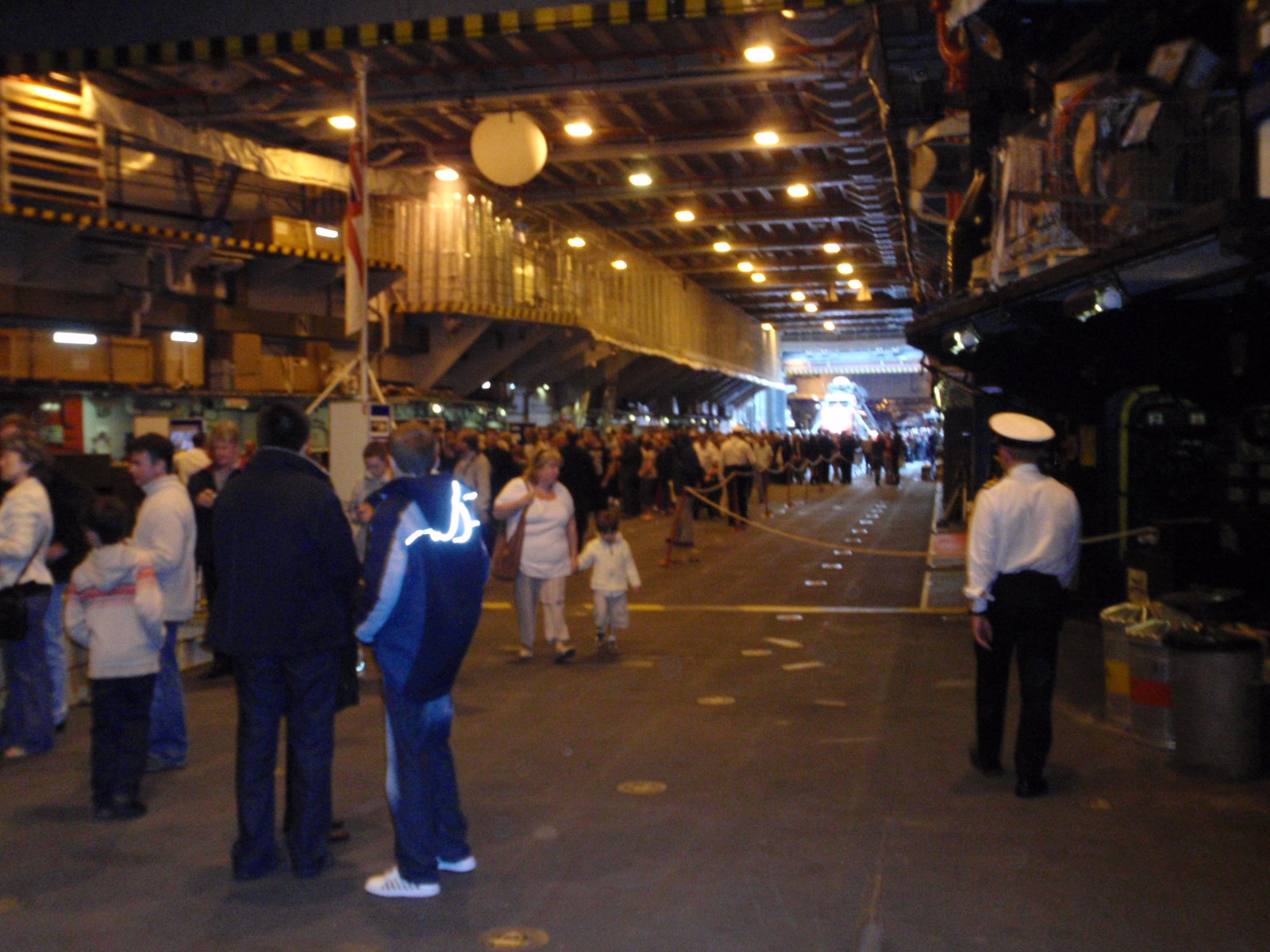
Ark Royal's hangar

A Ministry of Defence spokesperson stated on 1 December 2010 that, "All options are being considered in terms of what happens to the Ark Royal after it is decommissioned. We might also look at scrapping it, selling it or recycling it." Other options explored were to moor her as a hotel, casino, museum ship or visitor attraction at the Royal Docks in east London or at Mablethorpe in Lincolnshire, along the lines of USS Intrepid or HMS Belfast. The annual cost of running the ship as a museum was estimated at £1 million. Another option explored was to moor her as a floating helipad in London's Royal Albert Dock, though that would have been against the London Plan to create no new helipads in London. Another option considered was to turn Ark Royal into a hospital ship with the ability to respond to humanitarian disasters. The possibility of scuttling Ark Royal off the Devonshire coast as an artificial reef was also discussed.

On 28 March 2011, the Ministry of Defence placed the decommissioned Ark Royal up for sale by auction, with 6 July as the final date for tenders. In June 2012, the MoD confirmed it had not reached a decision on the sale of the ship, following the submission of bids nearly a year previously. In September 2012, the announcement was made that the ship had been sold to Leyal Ship Recycling in Turkey for scrapping, for the sum of £2.9m. Ark Royal left Portsmouth on 20 May 2013 to be taken to Leyal Ship Recycling. The ship was towed to scrapyard on 10 June 2013 in Aliağa.

== Affiliations ==
- City of Leeds
- Wartime Ark Royals Association
- TS Ark Royal (Leeds)
- TS Ark Royal (Reigate)
- Leeds Royal Naval Association
- University Royal Naval Unit Yorkshire
- Reigate Royal Naval Association
- RAF Boulmer
- 17th/21st Lancers
