= Indomitable (album) =

Studio album by Leaders
- Released: September 3, 2013
- Genre: Christian metal, crossover thrash, metalcore
- Length: 33:46
- Label: Facedown
- Producer: Leaders, Seth Munson

Leaders chronology
Now We Are Free (2012)	Indomitable (2013)

Indomitable is the second studio album from Leaders. Facedown Records released the album on September 3, 2013. Leaders worked with Seth Munson, in the production of this album.

== Critical reception ==
Professional ratings
Review scores
Source	Rating
Cross Rhythms	8/10 squares
HM Magazine	3/5 stars
Indie Vision Music	4/5 stars
Jesus Freak Hideout	3.5/5 stars

Awarding the album three stars for HM Magazine, David Stagg states, "While the record isn't anything innovative, it's a heavy offering, and I appreciate heavy." Ian Webber, rating the album an eight out of ten at Cross Rhythms, says, "Indomitable is not really innovative, but it is loud and enjoyable." Giving the album three and a half stars from Jesus Freak Hideout, Aaron Lambert writes, "it's just a stronger album than its predecessor." Lee Brown, indicating in a four star review by Indie Vision Music, describes, "Indomitable is a great album from start to finish, with no filler added."

== Track listing ==
All tracks are written by Leaders.

No.	Title	Length
1.	"Hell"	3:19
2.	"Weak Minds" (featuring Brook Reeves - Impending Doom)	2:29
3.	"Dead End"	4:02
4.	"Nightmares"	2:17
5.	"Indomitable"	3:44
6.	"Underdogs"	2:57
7.	"I Know"	2:34
8.	"You Walkers"	2:46
9.	"Pharisaical"	2:48
10.	"Struggles"	2:37
11.	"My Home" (featuring Canaan Smith - Altars)	4:13
Total length:		33:46

== Personnel ==
Credits for Indomitable adapted from discogs.

Leaders

- Lazarus Rios Jr. – vocals
- Josh Reeves – guitar
- Jake Dirkson – bass
- Johnathen Somner – drums

Production

- Produced by Leaders & Seth Munson
- Mixed & mastered by Seth Munson
- Management by Lazarus Rios Jr.
- Publicity by Shannon Quiggle
- Booking by Daniel McCartney (The Action Agency)
- Artwork & design by Dave Quiggle (davequiggle.com)
- Photo by Jesus Ernesto Martinez
