= Rear admiral (D) =

Military rank of the British Royal Navy

In the British Royal Navy, a Rear Admiral (D) or Rear Admiral Destroyers is a flag officer in command of the destroyer flotillas of a fleet.

== See also ==
- Rear admiral
