= English ship Ark Royal (1587) =

English galleon and naval flagship

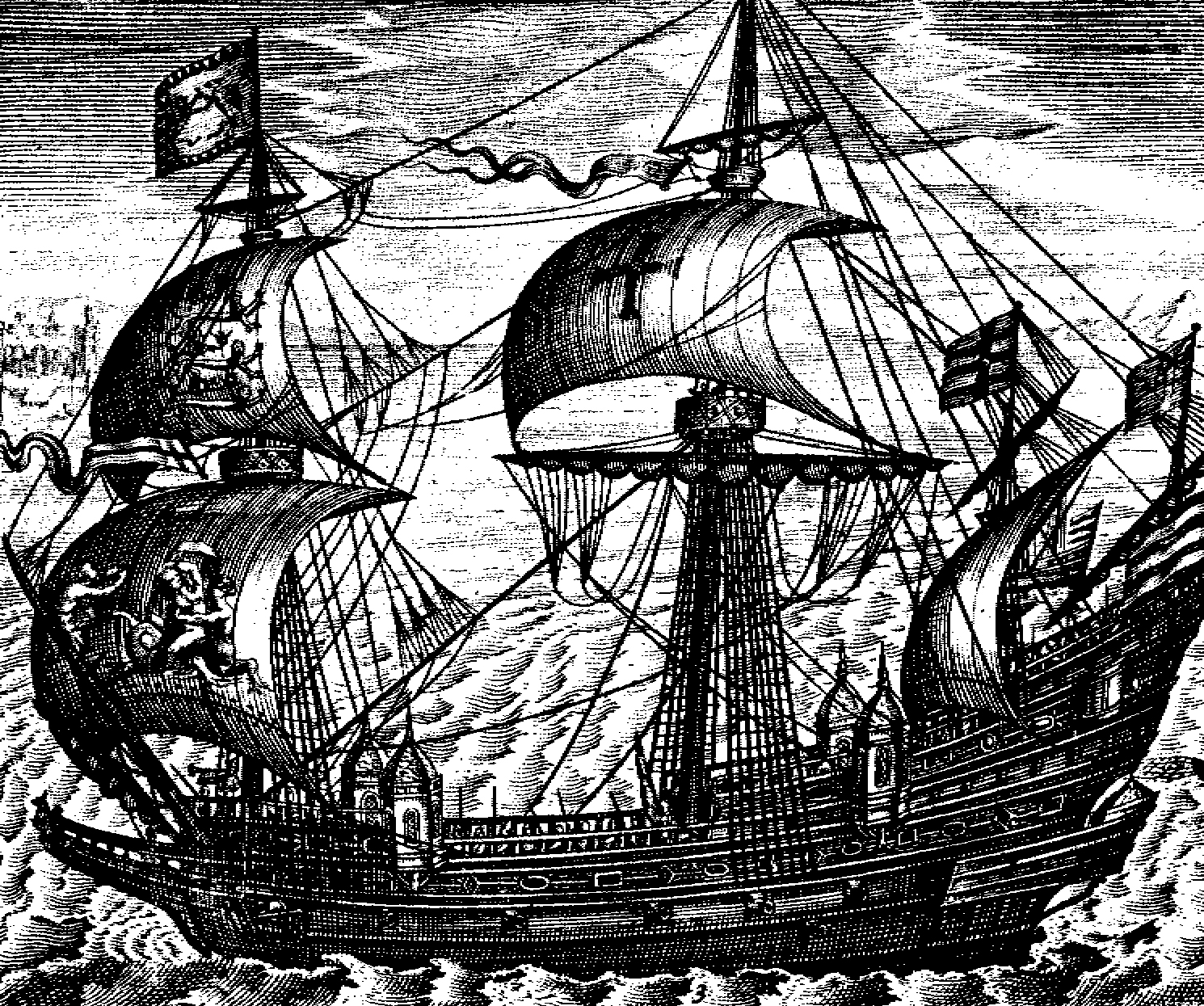
- The Ark Royal, engraving by Claes Jansz. Visscher

History

England
- Name: Ark Raleigh
- Ordered: 1586
- Launched: 1587
- Commissioned: 1587
- Renamed: Ark Royal, 1587; Anne Royal, 1608
- Fate: Sunk in April 1636, raised and broken up in 1638
- Notes: Participated in: Spanish Armada

General characteristics as built
- Tons burthen: 555 bm
- Complement: 268 sailors, 32 gunners, 100 soldiers
- Armament: 1599 – 55 guns: 4 × 60-pounders; 4 × 30-pounders; 12 × 18-pounders; 12 × 9-pounders; 6 × 6-pounders; 17 × small guns

General characteristics after 1608 rebuild
- Class & type: 42-gun royal ship
- Tons burthen: 694 bm
- Length: 103 ft (31 m) (keel)
- Beam: 37 ft (11 m)
- Depth of hold: 16 ft (4.9 m)
- Sail plan: Full-rigged ship
- Armament: 42 guns of various weights of shot

Ark Royal (Note: The HMS prefix was not used until the middle of the eighteenth century, but is sometimes applied retroactively.) was an English galleon, originally ordered for Sir Walter Raleigh and later purchased by the crown for service in the Tudor navy. She was used as the English flagship in a number of engagements, including the battles that resulted in the defeat of the Spanish Armada, and had a long career spanning over 50 years. Her fame led to a number of later warships of the Royal Navy being named Ark Royal in her honour, including a number of flagships of the fleet.

== Construction and early year ==
Ark Royal was originally built to order by the shipbuilder R. Chapman, of Deptford, for Sir Walter Raleigh, who was approximately 32 years of age at the time. The ship was to be called Ark, which became Ark Raleigh, following the convention at the time where the ship bore the name of her owner. The Crown, in the person of Queen Elizabeth I, purchased the ship from Raleigh in January 1587 for the sum of £5,000 (although this took the form of a reduction in the sum Sir Walter owed the queen: he received Exchequer tallies, but no money). Her new commander, Lord High Admiral of England Lord Howard of Effingham, described the sum as "money well given". She was henceforth to be known as Ark Royal. As built, she had two gun decks, a double forecastle, a quarter deck, and a poop deck right aft. She was an effective warship, but tended to roll heavily, to the discomfort of the embarked soldiers unused to the motion.

== Career ==
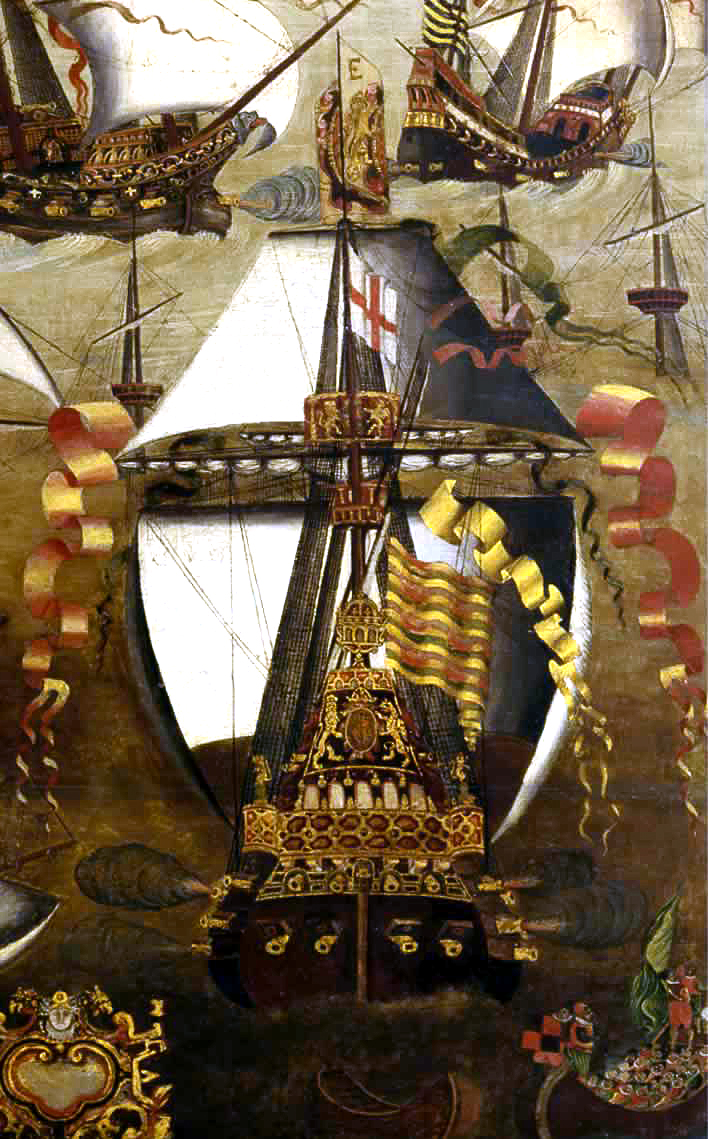
Ark Royal at the Battle of Gravelines

Her first action came in 1588 during the attack of the Spanish Armada, when Ark Royal, as one of the largest vessels in the English fleet, was the flagship of Lord High Admiral Howard. After the initial defeat of the Armada, Ark Royal led the chase of the fleeing ships into the North Sea and beyond the Firth of Forth. She was also used as Howard's flagship during the 1596 raid on Cádiz, which resulted in the destruction of much of the Spanish fleet at harbour. Ark Royal was the flagship once more during 1599 when a Spanish invasion again threatened.

On the accession of James VI and I to the English throne, Ark Royal was renamed Anne Royal, after his consort, Anne of Denmark. She was then rebuilt at Woolwich Dockyard in 1608 by Phineas Pett I as a 42-gun royal ship. Under her new name, she was the flagship of Lord Wimbledon in the 1625 raid on Cádiz which ended in disaster due to inadequate preparation.

== Loss ==
She remained in service until April 1636, when she was being moved from the River Medway to serve as the flagship of Sir John Penington. While anchored in shallow water, she struck her own anchor and stove in her timbers, sinking in the river. She was raised at a cost greater than her original purchase price, but was found to be damaged beyond repair and was broken up in 1638.

== Citations ==
| Preceded by (First) | HMS Ark Royal; 1587–1636 | Succeeded by 1914 |
