= HMS Argyll (F231) =

1991 Type 23 or Duke-class frigate of the Royal Navy

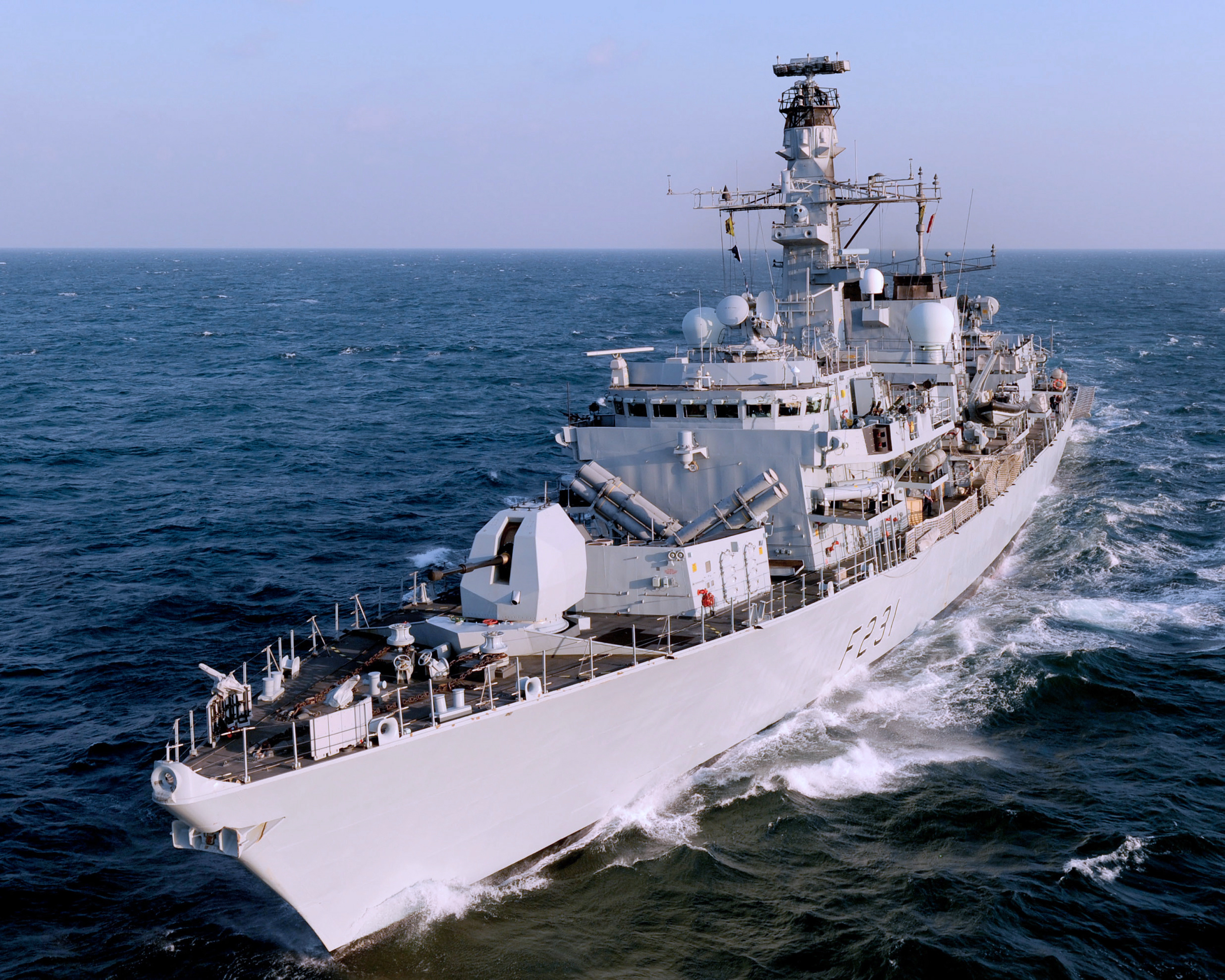
- HMS Argyll, 2009

History

United Kingdom
- Name: HMS Argyll
- Ordered: September 1986
- Builder: Yarrow Shipbuilders
- Laid down: 20 March 1987
- Launched: 8 April 1989
- Commissioned: 31 May 1991
- Decommissioned: No formal decommissioning ceremony; withdrawn from service in 2024 and informal decommissioning ceremonies took place in 2025
- Out of service: May 2024
- Home port: HMNB Portsmouth
- Identification: IMO number: 8949599; MMSI number: 165327752; Pennant number: F231; International callsign: GACG
- Motto: Ne Obliviscaris; ("Lest We Forget")
- Status: Awaiting disposal
- Badge

General characteristics
- Class & type: Type 23 frigate
- Displacement: 4,900 t (4,800 long tons; 5,400 short tons)
- Length: 133 m (436 ft 4 in)
- Beam: 16.1 m (52 ft 10 in)
- Draught: 7.3 m (23 ft 11 in)
- Propulsion: CODLAG: Four 1,510 kW (2,025 hp) Paxman Valenta 12CM diesel generators; Two GEC electric motors delivering 2,980 kW (4,000 hp); Two Rolls-Royce Spey SM1C delivering 23,190 kW (31,100 hp)
- Speed: In excess of 28 kn (52 km/h; 32 mph)
- Range: 7,500 nautical miles (14,000 km) at 15 kn (28 km/h)
- Complement: 185 (accommodation for up to 205)
- Electronic warfare & decoys: UAF-1 ESM, or, UAT Mod 1; Seagnat; Type 182 towed torpedo decoy; Surface Ship Torpedo Defence
- Armament: Anti-air missiles: 1 × 32-cell GWS 35 Vertical Launching System (VLS) for: 32 × Sea Ceptor missiles (1–25+ km); Anti-ship missiles: 2 × quad Harpoon Block 1C (originally fit, retired 2023); Anti-submarine torpedoes: 2 × twin 12.75 in (324 mm) Sting Ray torpedo tubes; Guns: 1 × BAE 4.5 inch Mk 8 naval gun; 2 × 30 mm DS30M, or DS30B guns; 2 × Miniguns (may be replaced by Browning .50 caliber heavy machine guns as of 2023); 4 × General-purpose machine gun
- Aircraft carried: 1 × Wildcat HMA2, armed with: 2 × Sting Ray anti-submarine torpedoes, or; 20 × Martlet multirole air-surface missiles (from 2021); Mk 11 depth charges; or; 1 × Westland Merlin HM2, armed with; 4 × anti submarine torpedoes
- Aviation facilities: Flight deck; Enclosed hangar

The third HMS Argyll is a Type 23 Duke-class frigate. Commissioned in 1991 and prior to her retirement, Argyll was the oldest serving Type 23 frigate in the Royal Navy. Like all of her class she was named after a British dukedom, in this case that of Argyll. HMS Argyll was laid down in March 1987 by Yarrow Shipbuilders at Glasgow, and launched in 1989 by Lady Wendy Levene, sponsored by the Worshipful Company of Paviors.

Argyll was the first Type 23 to be fitted with the new Sea Ceptor missile system. The ship, like her sisters HMS Monmouth, HMS Montrose, HMS Lancaster and HMS Iron Duke, did not receive the new Sonar 2087 upgrade that other frigates of the class subsequently received. Therefore she was regarded as a "general purpose" frigate without the more specialized anti-submarine capability of the other eight ships in the Type 23 fleet.

Argyll was retired and sold to BAE Systems for apprentice training in 2024. However, this plan was subsequently abandoned and in September 2025 she was towed from Devonport to Portsmouth for disposal.

== Operational history ==
=== 1991–2000 ===
On 26 March 1994, Argyll's Lynx helicopter crashed into the sea off Andros Island in the West Indies while practising for an air display. The crew escaped and were rescued but the aircraft was unrecoverable after sinking in 5,000ft of water.

In 2000, Argyll was part of the Royal Navy task force – Task Group 342.01 – comprising Illustrious, Ocean, Iron Duke, Chatham, and four RFA ships – that deployed to Sierra Leone as part of the British military intervention in the Sierra Leone civil war. During those operations, Argyll acted as the West African Guardship and remained off West Africa until September 2000. Throughout this period Argyll operated with her Lynx HMA Mk 8 helicopter. The Lynx undertook daily patrols and searches. The Lynx was instrumental to the successful completion of Operation Barras. During her deployment, the helicopter was scrambled to search for a missing passenger ferry. The aircraft's crew quickly located the vessel and provided escort for Argyll. Argyll saved fifty-eight lives from drowning. She was relieved by her sister-ship Iron Duke in September. During this incident Argyll, assisted by HMS Ocean, laid the foundation for the Iron Duke Community School. This is a school for orphans in Freetown. President Kabbah of Sierra Leone decreed the school be named after the crew of Iron Duke for completing the construction of the six classrooms.

=== 2001–2010 ===
In 2001, while in the Bay of Biscay, Argyll suffered an electrical fire that was quickly put out by the ship's damage control team, with the ship suffering only minimal damage.

Argyll completed a six-month deployment to the Persian Gulf protecting two oil platforms, working with the American, Australian and Iraqi Navies from February to August 2005. The ship made a short visit to Boulogne, then to its home port of Inveraray and finally to Liverpool, before undergoing Operational Sea Trials. Argyll successfully completed Operational Sea Training and acted as a contingency platform whilst the Queen spent a week sailing on the Hebridean Princess in July 2006.

In September 2006 Argyll was deployed along with other ships such as Ocean and Albion where she completed two drugs raids on merchant ships totaling £50 million. They completed their operation in November of the same year.

In October 2007 Argyll returned to the Persian Gulf to take over from her sister-ship, Richmond.

On 3 April 2008 more than 500 friends and relatives welcomed HMS Argyll as she returned to her home at Devonport after a deployment lasting six months in the Northern Persian Gulf. This was Argyll's second Gulf deployment to Combined Task Force (CTF) 150 in three years. This deployment included one patrol which lasted 52 days from January to March 2008. HMS Argyll was also at the 'Meet Your Navy' exhibition at HMNB Portsmouth 2008.

6 May 2008 saw the crew return to Argyll, with the crew bidding farewell to their commanding officer of seven months, Commander Gavin Pritchard. He was succeeded by Commander Peter Olive. Argyll was then to engage in a period of trials and training before entering a period of maintenance in June.

11 May 2008 saw the Trans-Atlantic solo yacht race in Plymouth Sound started by the ceremonial cannon aboard Argyll. Dame Ellen MacArthur also attended the start of the race and Rear Admiral Richard Ibbotson, head of the Flag Officer Sea Training organisation, was also on board Argyll.

On 21 July 2008 Argyll led the parade of tall ships out of Liverpool ahead of the Tall Ships Race starting 23 July.

On 18 February 2009, Argyll sailed from Devonport as part of the Taurus 09 deployment under Commander UK Amphibious Task Group, Commodore Peter Hudson, She was joined on this deployment by Landing Platform Dock Bulwark, as Hudson's flagship, Landing Platform Helicopter (LPH) Ocean, Type 23 frigate Somerset and four ships of the Royal Fleet Auxiliary. Argyll returned to Devonport on 17 April from this deployment.

In early October 2010, Argyll and her crew arrived in Plymouth after an 11-month refit which included 290,000-man-hours spent on modifications, upgrades and improvements." She has received a new command system, upgrades to Sea Wolf, the Mod1 4.5-inch (114mm) gun, and mounts for new small calibre guns. She was also given new boat-launching equipment. "The refit included the replacing of two of the vessel's four diesel generators and one of her gas turbine engines." Her ventilation system has been improved. "Along with fresh paint on the upper decks she has been coated below the waterline with a special paint to prevent the build-up of sea life which would slow the ship. This also makes her more fuel-efficient." HMS Argyll was the first Type 23 frigate to undergo a second major refit.

=== 2011–2021 ===
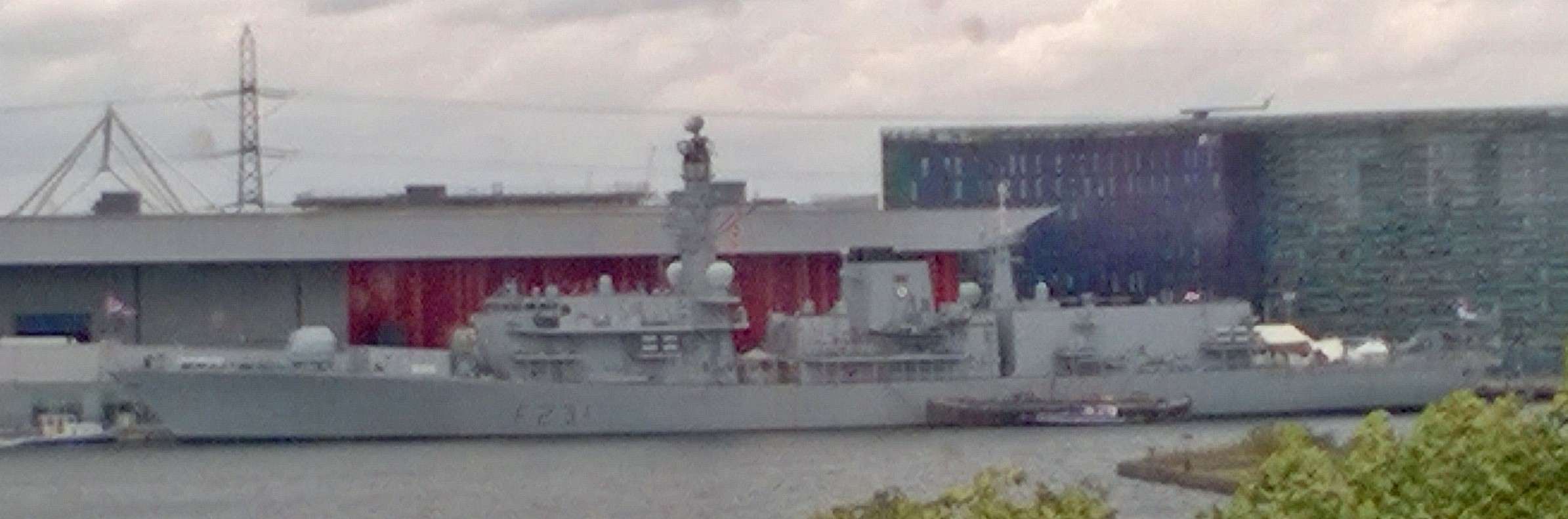
HMS Argyll moored in the Royal Victoria Dock for DSEI 2017.

On Sunday 22 January 2012 it was announced that Argyll was part of a six-ship convoy which sailed through the Strait of Hormuz alongside French and United States Navy vessels, during a diplomatic dispute with Iran. In a period after this she engaged in Exercise 'Goalkeeper' whilst still in the Middle East.

On 30 June 2012, Armed Forces Day, Argyll fired the salute in Plymouth as part of a steampast alongside RFA Mounts Bay, the Earl of Wessex was in attendance alongside the First Sea Lord.

In 2013, the warship carried out a seven-month deployment to the Atlantic, having visited South Africa. She also engaged in counter-narcotics work in the Eastern Pacific by travelling around Cape Horn and headed back to her home port via the Panama Canal.

In March 2014, a test (unarmed) torpedo was accidentally fired whilst training at Devonport, there were no injuries and minimal damage.

On 30 June 2014, Argyll arrived in Hamilton, Bermuda for a three-day visit as part of her deployment to the North Atlantic and Caribbean.

The warship arrived in Baltimore, Maryland, US on 11 September 2014 to participate in ceremonies commemorating the 200th anniversary of the Star Spangled Banner.

On 25 September 2014, Argyll arrived in Veracruz.

On 6 October 2014, HMS Argyll visited George Town, Grand Cayman, after having been on counter-narcotics deployment in August 2014 as part of Operation Martillo. From 9 to 13 October 2014 HMS Argyll paid an official visit to the Dominican Republic during the course of which her flight deck hosted the baptism of Stefania Rozsa, daughter of the British Ambassador. On 18 October 2014, the warship arrived in Bermuda to provide assistance in the aftermath of Hurricane Gonzalo.

In 2014, a Lynx from Argyll identified a suspicious yacht in the Caribbean Sea, and a detachment of the U.S. Coast Guard operating from Argyll seized $16 million worth of cocaine found on the yacht. The group had seized an even larger shipment earlier on the same deployment.

In 2015, Argyll underwent an extended Life Extension (LIFEX) refit in Devonport; she returned to sea in February 2017 with a new principal weapon system, Sea Ceptor, and numerous modifications and alterations to her accommodation and working spaces. Argyll acted as the trials vessel for Sea Ceptor prior to resuming her operational duties and it was announced in September 2017 that she had undertaken the first firings of the new system earlier in the summer off the west coast of Scotland.

In 2017, it was announced that Argyll would be sent to join military exercises in the Asia Pacific with the Five Power Defence Arrangements partners and also the Japanese Maritime Self Defence Force. Part of her mission is "to continue the pressure campaign on North Korea".

On 11 March 2019, Argyll rescued a 27-strong crew from a burning container vessel Grande America 150 miles off the coast of France.

On 15 March 2019 the ship returned to HMNB Devonport after a nine-month deployment to Southeast Asia.

On 11 September 2019, Argyll demonstrated the use of an autonomous PAC24 unmanned surface vehicle, a modified version of the boat the ship already carries, at the Defence and Security Equipment International 2019 exhibition. Also involved in the demonstration was an additional autonomous boat: the MAST-13.

In December 2020, the ship visited Egypt to allow for strategic talks between British First Sea Lord Admiral Tony Radakin and Egyptian Admiral Ahmed Khaled Hassan Saeed. The ship took part in joint-exercises between Egypt and the UK.

=== 2022–present ===
In May 2022, Argyll became the first Type 23 to have undergone a LIFEX refit to undergo a subsequent major upkeep period, which saw the ship dry-docked for an extended period to enable it to be retained in service until around 2027-28, when it was intended to be replaced by either HMS Glasgow or HMS Venturer. In response to questions posed in Parliament, the Minister of State at the MoD, James Cartlidge, could not confirm that HMS Argyll would remain in service. In May 2024, it was confirmed that the frigate would be retired and sold to BAE Systems to support apprentice training.

In 2022, it was reported that Argyll spent 21 days at sea.

Argyll had been scheduled to be withdrawn from service in 2023. However, in 2021 in a written answer provided to the House of Commons Select Defence Committee, the First Sea Lord, Admiral Tony Radakin, suggested that older Type 23 frigates would be retained in service longer than anticipated in order to ensure that total escort numbers did not fall below 17 ships (6 destroyers and 11 frigates) and start to rise above 19 escorts starting in 2026. This would have required Argyll to have been kept in service significantly longer than anticipated.

However in May 2024, it was indicated that she would be retired and sold to BAE Systems for apprentice training instead (though this plan was subsequently abandoned and the ship was prepared for disposal). This occurred despite the fact that in May 2022 Argyll began an 18-month refit with the intent of extending her service life until about 2027-28.

== Related images ==
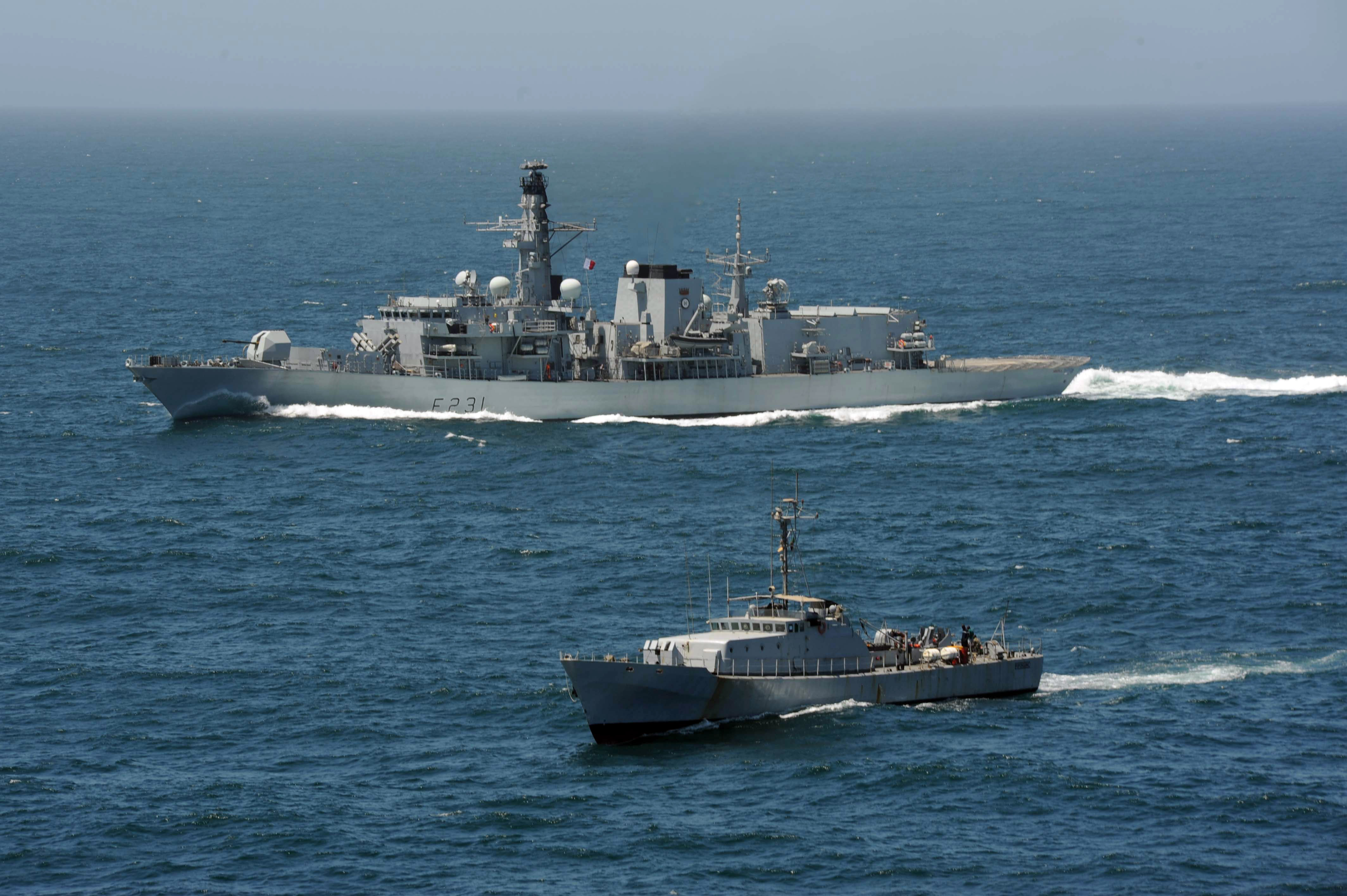
HMS Argyll off Senegal, in 2013

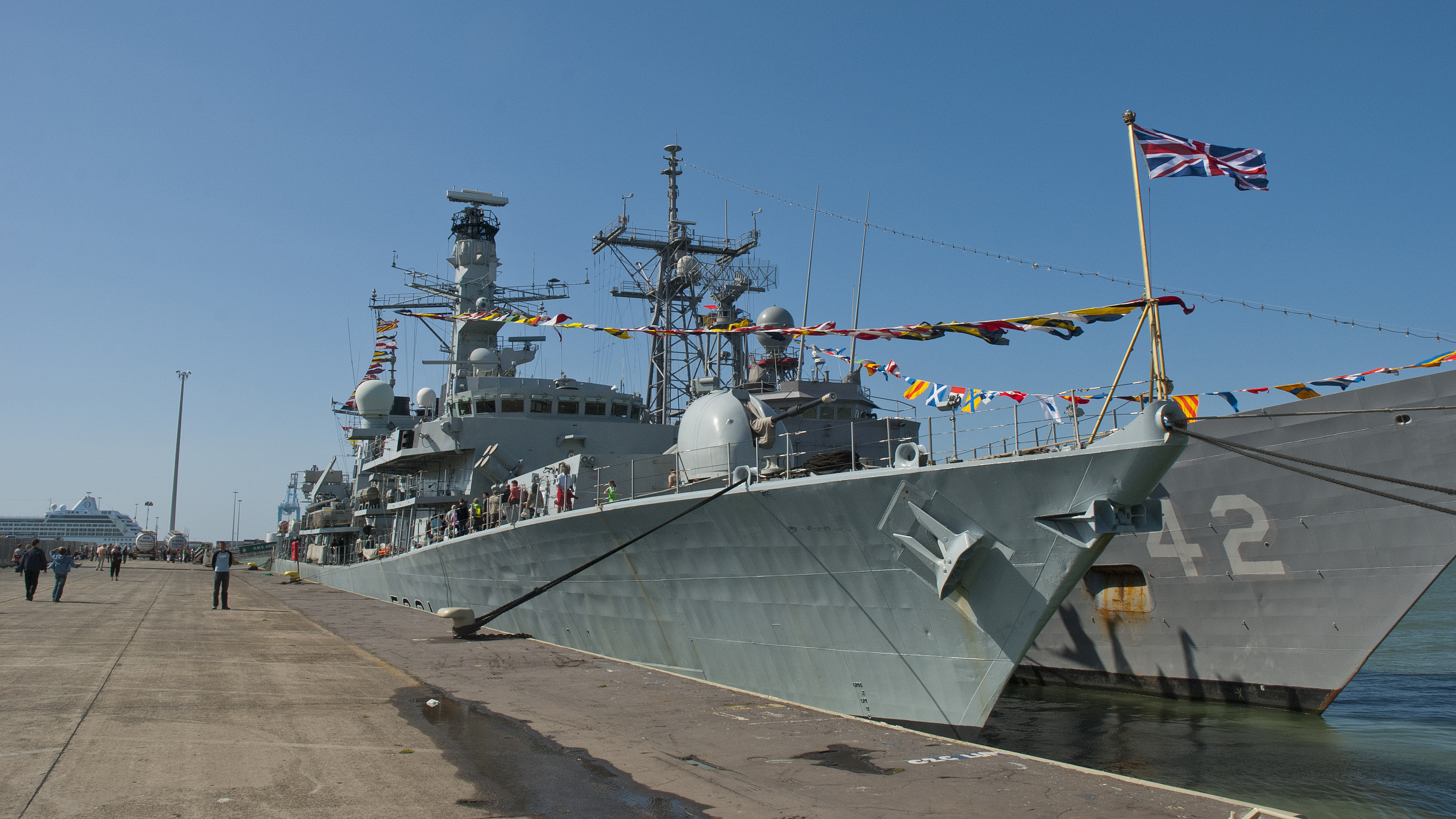
HMS Argyll during Navydays Zeebrugge 2009

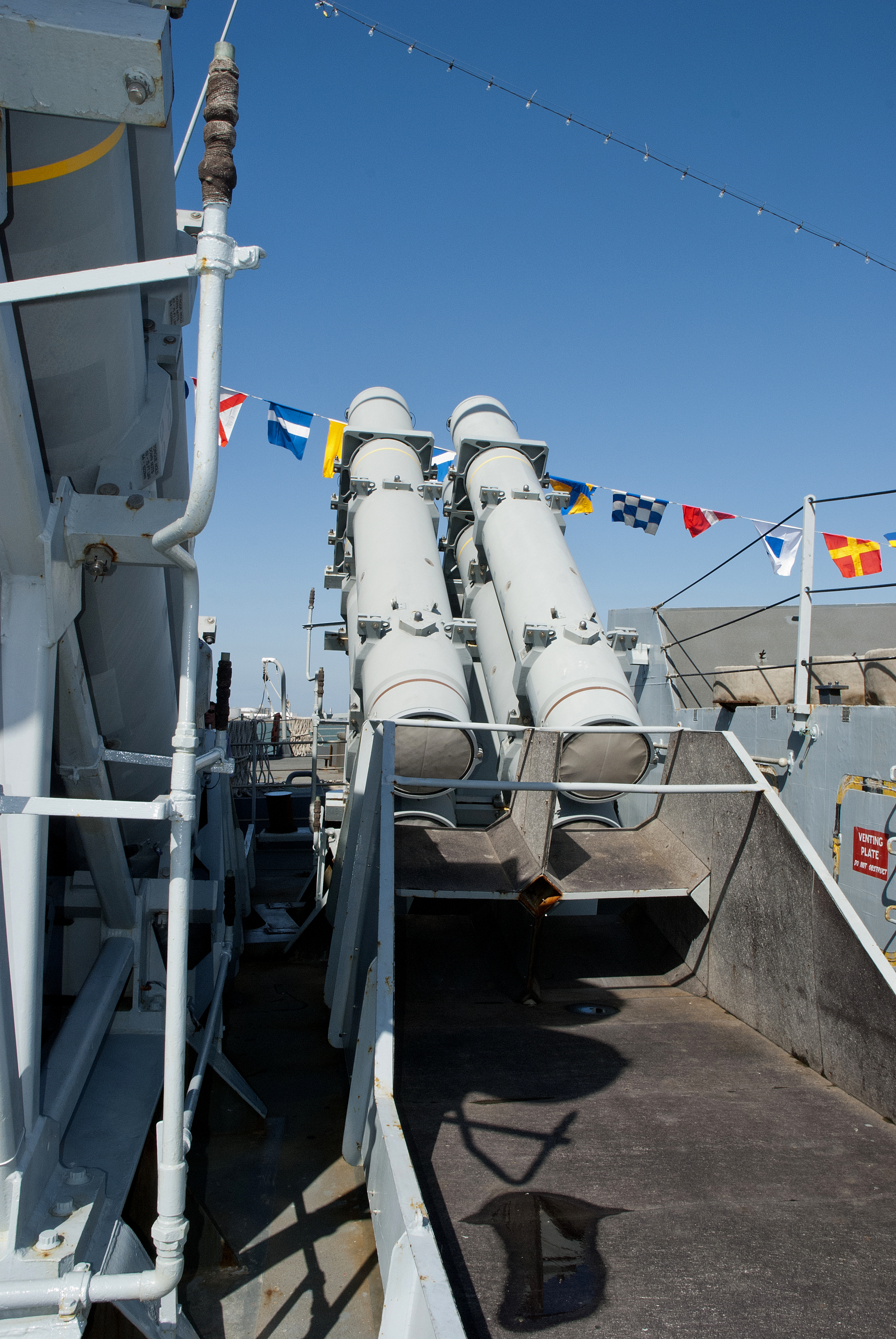
Harpoon anti-ship missiles on Argyll

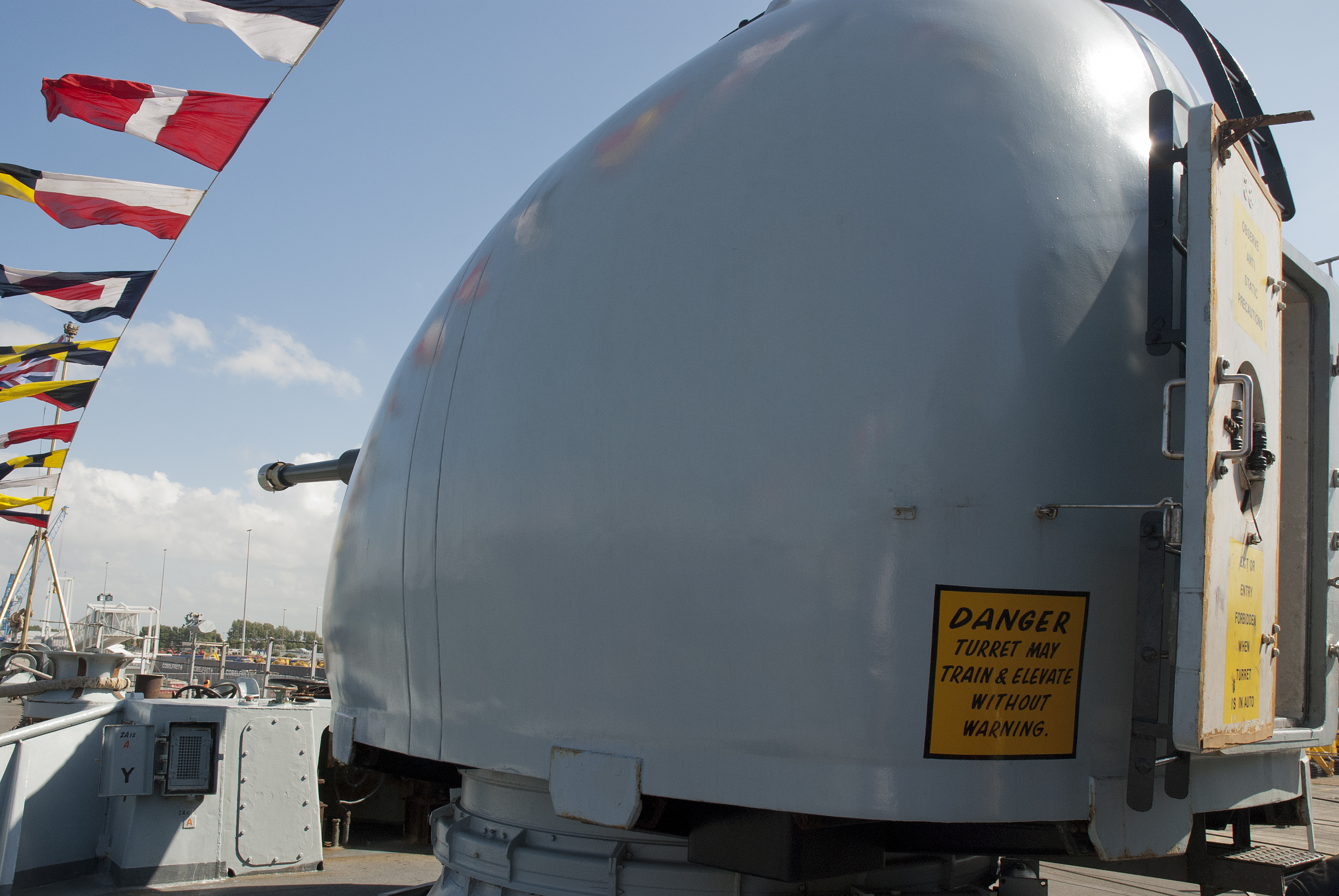
4.5-inch Mark 8 naval gun on board Argyll (prior to refit)

== Affiliations ==
HMS Argyll was affiliated with:

- His Grace, The Duke of Argyll
- The Argyll and Sutherland Highlanders, 5th Battalion Royal Regiment of Scotland
- No. 47 Squadron RAF
- Argyll and Bute District Council

School Crest of the Dollar Academy, affiliate of HMS Argyll.

- City of Glasgow
- Worshipful Company of Paviors
- Plymouth Argyle F.C.
- Lady Levene, the ship's sponsor
- HMS Vivid RNR
- Royal Naval Club, Argyll
- Royal Naval Association Stirling
- TS Argyll – Irvine & District Sea Cadets
- City of London Sea Cadets
- Mount Kelly, Devon
- Dollar Academy, Clackmannanshire
- High School of Glasgow
- Argyll Ward, Derriford Hospital

In July 2017, GB Railfreight named locomotive 66775 Argyll in honour of HMS Argyll in a ceremony at Devonport.
