= HMS Marlborough (F233) =

1991 Type 23 frigate of the Royal Navy

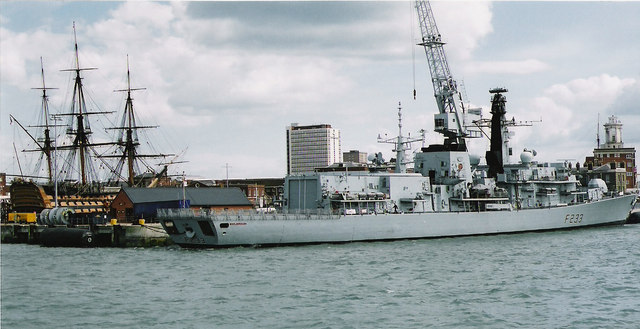
- HMS Marlborough in Portsmouth Harbour in 2005

History

United Kingdom
- Name: Marlborough
- Namesake: Marlborough
- Ordered: September 1986
- Builder: Swan Hunter
- Laid down: 27 October 1987
- Launched: 21 January 1989
- Commissioned: 14 June 1991
- Decommissioned: 8 July 2005
- Motto: S'en Vat'en Guerre; (He Goes to War)
- Fate: Sold to Chile
- Badge

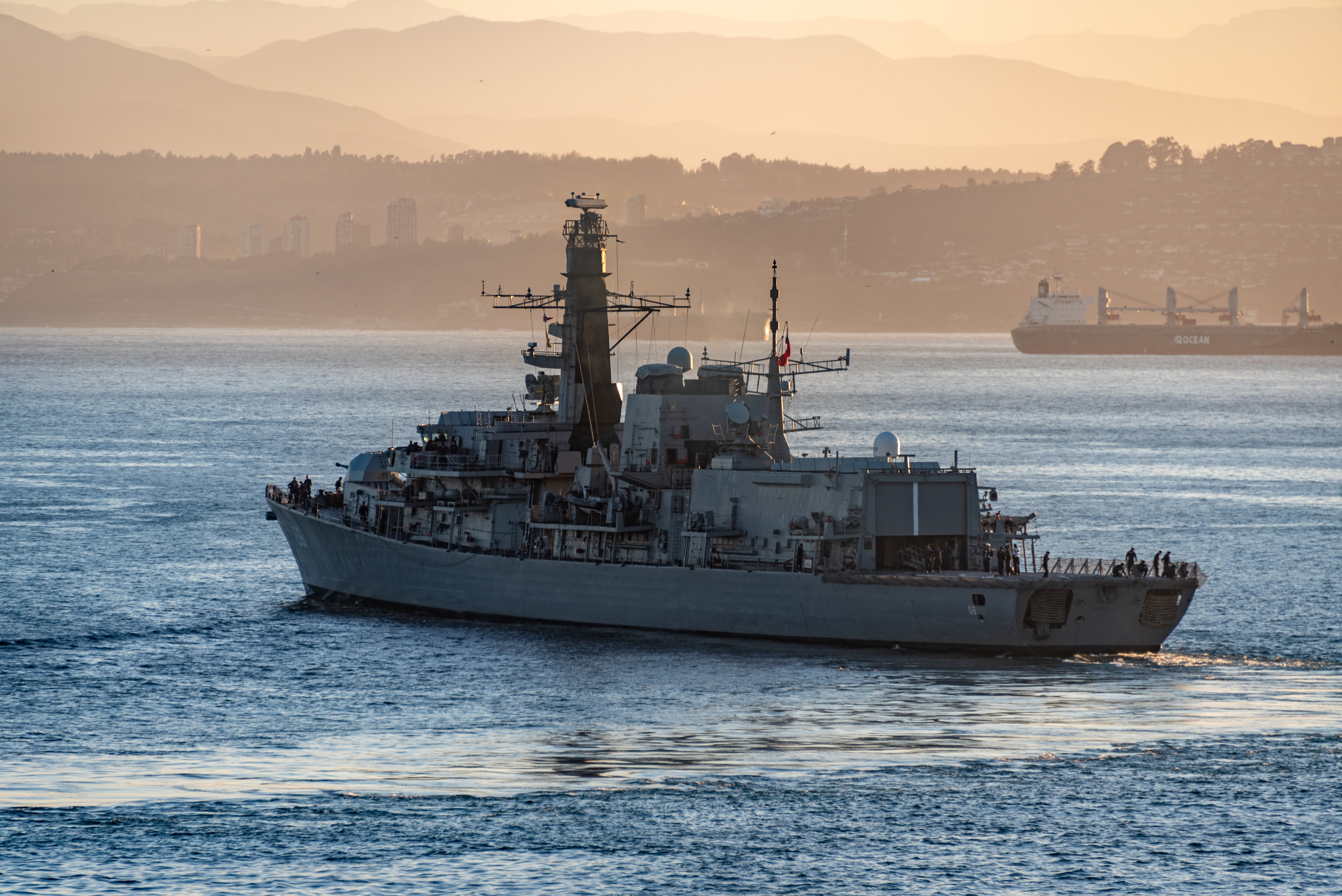
- Almirante Condell at the port of Valparaíso, Chile in 2019

Chile
- Name: Almirante Condell
- Commissioned: 28 May 2008
- Refit: 2021
- Home port: Valparaíso
- Status: Active
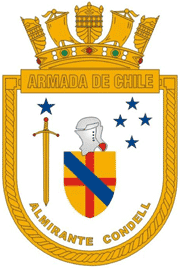
- Badge

General characteristics
- Class & type: Duke-class Type 23 frigate
- Displacement: 4,900 tonnes
- Length: 133 m (436 ft 4 in)
- Beam: 16.1 m (52 ft 10 in)
- Draught: 7.3 m (23 ft 11 in)
- Propulsion: CODLAG; 2 × Rolls Royce Marine Spey boost gas-turbines; 4 × Paxman Valenta diesel engines; 2 × GEC electric motors
- Speed: 28 knots (52 km/h; 32 mph); 15 kn (28 km/h; 17 mph) on diesel-electric
- Range: 7,800 nmi (14,400 km; 9,000 mi) at 15 kn (28 km/h; 17 mph)
- Complement: 185
- Armament: 2 × ASuW Harpoon quad launchers; 32 CAMM Sea Ceptor surface-to-air missiles; 1 × BAE 4.5-inch Mark 8 naval gun; 2 × Oerlikon 30 mm guns; 4 × Sting Ray torpedo tubes; Seagnat and DFL3 decoy launchers
- Aircraft carried: Eurocopter AS332 Super Puma or Eurocopter AS365 Dauphin

Almirante Condell is a Duke-class Type 23 frigate in service with the Chilean Navy. It entered service with the Royal Navy in 1991 with the name HMS Marlborough as the sixth ship to bear the name. She was named after John Churchill, 1st Duke of Marlborough, and served in the Middle East. The frigate was taken out of service in 2005 and sold to Chile. The vessel entered service with the Chilean Navy in 2008 and was renamed Almirante Condell after Carlos Condell, a Chilean naval officer during the War of the Pacific. The ship was significantly upgraded from 2020 to 2021 and remains in service.

== Service history ==
=== Royal Navy ===
Marlborough is a Duke-class Type 23 frigate and carried pennant number F233 rather than the sequential number of F232 which was considered unlucky, Form S.232 being the formal notification of a grounding or collision. The course 232 is also traditionally not given for the same reason, with a course heading of half degree either side of 232 being the alternative.

Marlborough was the first naval ship on the scene to assist the stricken USS Cole after she was attacked in Aden, Yemen in October 2000. Marlborough, under the command of Captain Anthony Rix, was on passage to the UK after a six-month deployment in the Gulf and had a full medical detachment on board. When her offer of assistance was accepted, she immediately diverted to Aden.

On 27 October 2001, the ship's Lynx helicopter crashed into the Arabian Sea after an Omani warship collided with the aircraft as it was hovering above the water. The pilot and observer suffered minor injuries and were taken onboard the aircraft carrier HMS Illustrious. The incident happened during exercise ‘Saif Sareea’ (Swift Sword) a joint exercise between British and Omani forces. The Lynx was dropping a dummy torpedo into the sea when an Omani vessel sailed into it from behind, catching the helicopter's rotor blades on its rigging.

Marlborough played a key role in the second Gulf War, under the command of Captain Mark Anderson.

In July 2004, it was announced that Marlborough would be one of three Type 23 ships to be decommissioned by the end of 2006. In October 2004 Marlborough again came to the aid of a stricken ally when she was dispatched to assist the submarine HMCS Chicoutimi, adrift off the northwest Irish coast and arrived at the scene where RFA Wave Knight and Marlborough's sister-ship HMS Montrose were present. Montrose had been the first ship to make contact with the boat. Other ships were also dispatched, including RFA Argus.

Prior to her decommissioning, Marlborough had a US Navy officer permanently assigned to her crew. Reciprocally, a Royal Navy officer was permanently assigned to the destroyer USS Winston S. Churchill.

=== Transfer to Chile ===
The 2003 defence cuts committed Marlborough to pay off by March 2006. In June 2005, it was announced that Marlborough would be sold to the Chilean Navy. The Chilean Navy officially welcomed their new Almirante Condell into the fleet at a commissioning ceremony on 28 May 2008. The vessel was the last of three former Royal Navy Type 23 frigates to be handed over to Chile, under a £134 million sales agreement arranged by the Ministry of Defence's Disposal Services Authority and signed in September 2005. She joins her sister ships in the Chilean Navy, the former HMS Norfolk and HMS Grafton, handed over in November 2006 and March 2007 respectively.

Along with other Chilean vessels of her class, Almirante Condell underwent a significant upgrade from September 2020 to October 2021. The CMS 330 combat management architecture was installed along TRS-4D G-Band active scanning radars and 32 CAMM Sea Ceptor vertical-launch surface-to-air missile silos to replace the previous Sea Wolf SAM system.
