= HMS Lancaster (F229) =

1992 Type 23 or Duke-class frigate of the Royal Navy

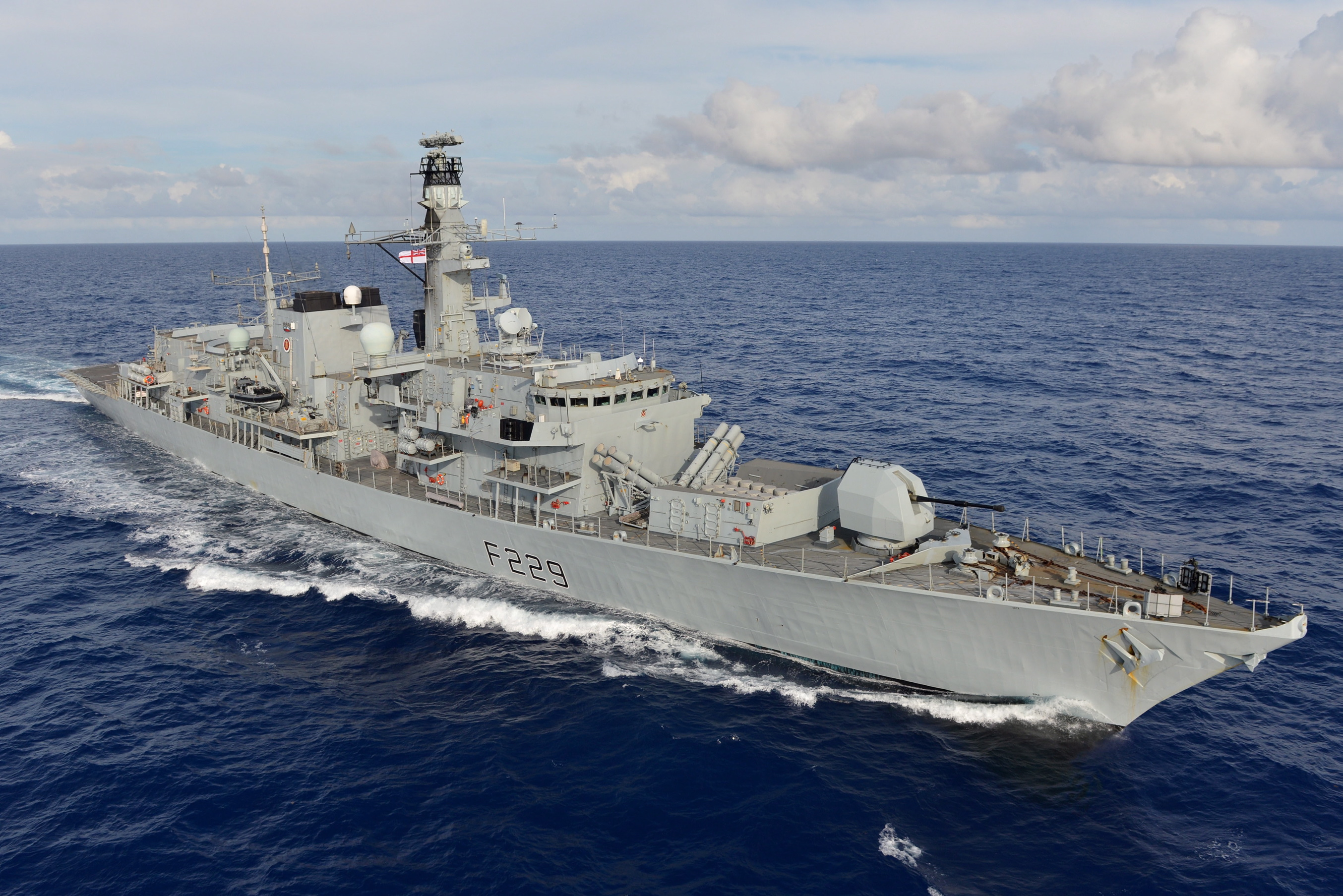
- HMS Lancaster in the Caribbean Sea during 2013

History

United Kingdom
- Name: Lancaster
- Ordered: September 1986
- Builder: Yarrow Shipbuilders
- Laid down: 18 December 1987
- Launched: 24 May 1990
- Sponsored by: Queen Elizabeth II
- Commissioned: 1 May 1992
- Out of service: 5 December 2025
- Refit: Major 2010–2012, LIFEX 2017–2019
- Home port: HMNB Portsmouth (forward deployed on Operation Kipion from 2022-2025)
- Nickname(s): The Queen's Frigate
- Status: Inactive and decommissioning
- Badge

General characteristics
- Class & type: Type 23 frigate
- Displacement: 4,900 t (4,800 long tons)
- Length: 133 m (436 ft 4 in)
- Beam: 16.1 m (52 ft 10 in)
- Draught: 7.3 m (23 ft 11 in)
- Propulsion: CODLAG: Four 1,510 kW (2,020 shp) Paxman Valenta 12CM diesel generators; Two GEC electric motors delivering 2,980 kW (4,000 shp); Two Rolls-Royce Spey SM1C delivering 23,190 kW (31,100 shp)
- Speed: In excess of 28 knots (52 km/h; 32 mph)
- Range: 7,500 nmi (13,900 km; 8,600 mi) at 15 knots (28 km/h; 17 mph)
- Complement: 185 (accommodation for up to 205)
- Electronic warfare & decoys: UAF-1 ESM, or, UAT Mod 1; Seagnat; Type 182 towed torpedo decoy; Surface Ship Torpedo Defence
- Armament: Anti-air missiles: 1 × 32-cell GWS 35 Vertical Launching System (VLS) for: 32 × Sea Ceptor missiles (1–25+ km); Anti-ship missiles: 2 × quad Harpoon Block 1C launchers (8 × missiles) for 2022 Gulf deployment; Harpoon retired from RN service December 2023 but retained on Lancaster as of end 2024; Anti-submarine torpedoes: 2 × twin 12.75 in (324 mm) Sting Ray torpedo tubes; Guns: 1 × BAE 4.5-inch Mk 8 naval gun; 2 × 30 mm DS30M Mk2 guns, or, 2 × 30 mm DS30B guns; Browning heavy machine guns; 2 × Miniguns (may be retired as of 2023); 4 × General-purpose machine gun
- Aircraft carried: 1 × Wildcat HMA2, armed with: 4 × Sea Venom anti-ship missiles (initial operating capability in late 2025) or; 2 × Sting Ray anti-submarine torpedoes, or; 20 × Martlet multirole missiles (from 2021); Mk 11 depth charges; or; 1 × Westland Merlin HM2, armed with; 4 × anti submarine torpedoes; plus; 2 x Peregrine ISR UAV (from mid-2024)
- Aviation facilities: Flight deck; Enclosed hangar

HMS Lancaster was a Duke-class Type 23 frigate of the Royal Navy, launched by Queen Elizabeth II on 24 May 1990. The ship was known as "The Queen's Frigate", the Duke of Lancaster being a subsidiary title of the Sovereign. Being the third ship in the Type 23 class, Lancaster was originally allocated the pennant number F232 until it was noted that the 232 is the Royal Navy report form for groundings and collisions and therefore considered unlucky.

The ship, like her sisters Monmouth, Montrose, Iron Duke and Argyll, did not receive the new Sonar 2087 upgrade that other frigates of the class subsequently received. Therefore she was regarded as a "general purpose" frigate without the more specialized anti-submarine capability that, originally, eight ships in the Type 23 fleet did receive.

== Operational history ==
=== 1992–2000 ===
In 1994, Lancaster deployed on a nine-month mission to the Caribbean Sea, and the Eastern Pacific Ocean, During this time she acted as guardship for the royal yacht HMY Britannia, conducted anti-drug smuggling operations and sonar trials. She also acted as guardship for Queen Elizabeth II during the Commonwealth Games in Victoria, British Columbia, Canada, in August 1994.

=== 2001–2010 ===
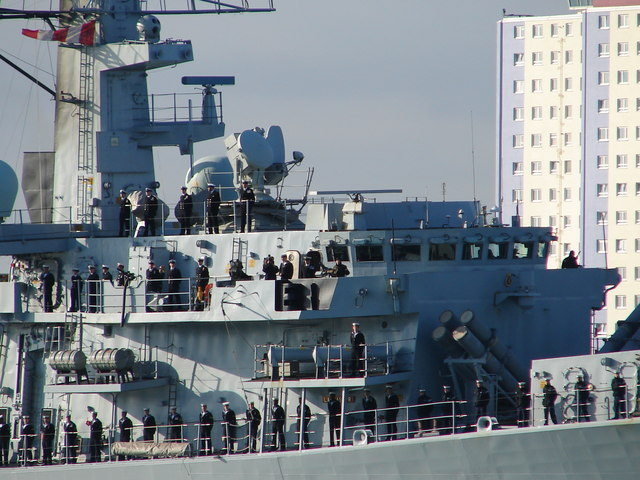
Lancaster returning from a deployment in the Persian Gulf

From Feb to July 2001 Lancaster deployed to the Gulf to patrol the Iraq no-fly zone.

Lancaster was involved in anti-drug operations in the Caribbean, but also delivered Vice Admiral Adrian Johns in 2009 to his new post as Governor of Gibraltar. In February 2010 Lancaster was deployed in waters off the Horn of Africa as part of Combined Task Force 150, tackling piracy, drug-running, people trafficking, arms smuggling, and other criminal and terrorist threats.

In September 2010 Lancaster entered refit in Portsmouth.

=== 2011–2017 ===
Lancaster returned to sea in early 2012 and returned to active service in Spring 2013. The £17.9m contract covered upgrades to communications, the Sea Wolf and command systems, the installation of a 30 mm remote-operated gun and a transom flap. Both shafts were replaced, four refurbished diesel generators installed and new paint applied to the hull. The accommodation, galley and dining halls were all refurbished at the same time. Half the crew returned to the ship in October 2011, under the command of Lt Cdr Charlie Guy until Cdr Steve Moorhouse took over in November 2011. Although the top speed of the Duke class is commonly quoted as 28 knots (52 km/h; 32 mph), the caption of an official Navy photo suggests that Lancaster was capable of 32 knots (59 km/h; 37 mph) even before her mid-life refit; the transom flap can add up to 1 knot (1.9 km/h; 1.2 mph) to the top speed of a Type 23, and the Intersleek anti-fouling paint added 2 knots (3.7 km/h; 2.3 mph) to the top speed of the carrier Ark Royal.

In July to August 2013, she was on a counter-narcotics mission in the Caribbean, seizing a 680-kilogram (1,500 lb) haul of cocaine with an estimated street value of £100 million after sailors and an embarked U.S. Coast Guard Law Enforcement Detachment boarded a speedboat near Puerto Rico.

On 23 March 2015, Lancaster became the first ship in the Royal Navy to deploy with the navy's new uniform and Wildcat helicopter.

The crew of the Lancaster gathered on the deck of the vessel to spell the word sister, as a present from the Royal Navy, on the birth of Princess Charlotte on 2 May 2015.

Between 12 and 16 October 2015 Lancaster and RFA Gold Rover participated in the bicentennial anniversary commemorations of Napoleon's arrival on Saint Helena after his defeat at the Battle of Waterloo, and subsequent surrender to British forces.

In 2015, the ship visited Algiers for three days for official receptions and a short spell of training with ships in the Algerian Navy, including the Algerian amphibious transport dock Kalaat Béni Abbès. She arrived back in the UK on 17 December 2015.

Upon her return to the UK, Lancaster entered a period of "extended readiness" in Portsmouth awaiting refit in 2017. Lancaster departed Portsmouth on 31 March 2017 under tow for Plymouth.

=== 2018–2025 ===
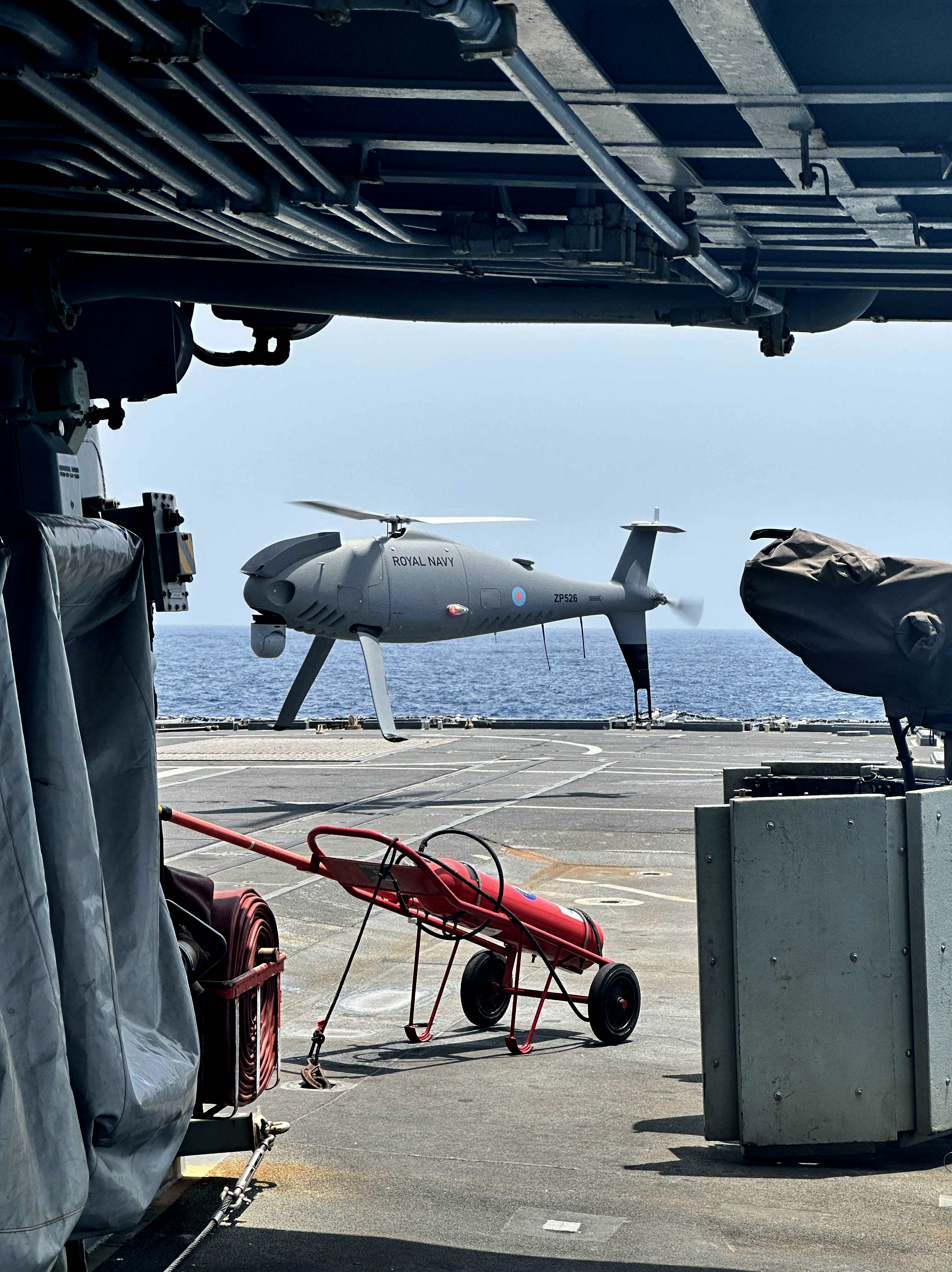
Peregrine (SchiebelCamcopter S-100) Rotary Wing UAV aboard HMS Lancaster

Lancaster underwent a life extension refit (LIFEX) at HMNB Devonport from 2017 to 2019 which included fitting of the Artisan 3D radar, Sea Ceptor anti-air missiles and strengthening the backbone of the ship.

The ship arrived back to its Home Port, HMNB Portsmouth, in December 2019. The ship was returned to operations in July 2020.

In August 2022, it was reported that in preparation for her planned deployment to the Persian Gulf to replace HMS Montrose, Lancaster had been fitted with a full complement of eight Harpoon anti-ship missiles. Lancaster sailed for the Gulf on August 15 on a deployment starting with NATO exercises in the Atlantic and Mediterranean. Once reaching the Persian Gulf, she was expected to remain forward deployed until 2025 with her crew being rotated every four months. Late in the month, Lancaster was diverted, at least temporarily, to shadow the Russian cruiser Marshal Ustinov and the destroyer Vice-Admiral Kulakov as they manoeuvred in the vicinity of the British Isles. Lancaster arrived in the Gulf in November 2022 and a crew swap was performed in December. It was announced in February 2025 that Lancaster had deployed the Peregrine UAV for the first time during anti-narcotics operations in the Indian Ocean and the Gulf of Oman; this followed a period of maintenance at Bahrain which included the replacement of a diesel generator and upgrades to weapon systems and sensors. In October 2025, a Royal Marine sniper from 42 Commando, embarked on the ship's Wildcat helicopter, disabled a drug-smuggling skiff in the Gulf of Oman, contributing to the interception of the vessel and drugs said to be worth £35 million. In November it had been reported that HMS Lancaster was to return to the U.K. in advance of her planned decommissioning. However, it was subsequently indicated that instead she would be decommissioned and disposed of in Bahrain.

On 5 December 2025, HMS Lancaster arrived in Bahrain for the final time after 34 years of service. She was greeted by a 34-gun salute and the Band of His Majesty’s Royal Marines deployed from HMS Collingwood in Fareham.

== Affiliations ==
- The Queen
- The Duke of Lancaster's Regiment (King's, Lancashire and Border)
- The Lancashire Army Cadet Force
- City of Lancaster
- Duchy of Lancaster
- Adjutant General's Corps
- Duke of Lancaster's Own Yeomanry
- Battle of Britain Memorial Flight
- Worshipful Company of Feltmakers
- University of Lancaster
- Morecambe and Lancaster Sea Cadet Corps (TS Lancaster)
- Preston Sea Cadet Corps (TS Galloway)
- The Worshipful Company of Constructors
