= Type 23 frigate =

Class of frigates built for the Royal Navy

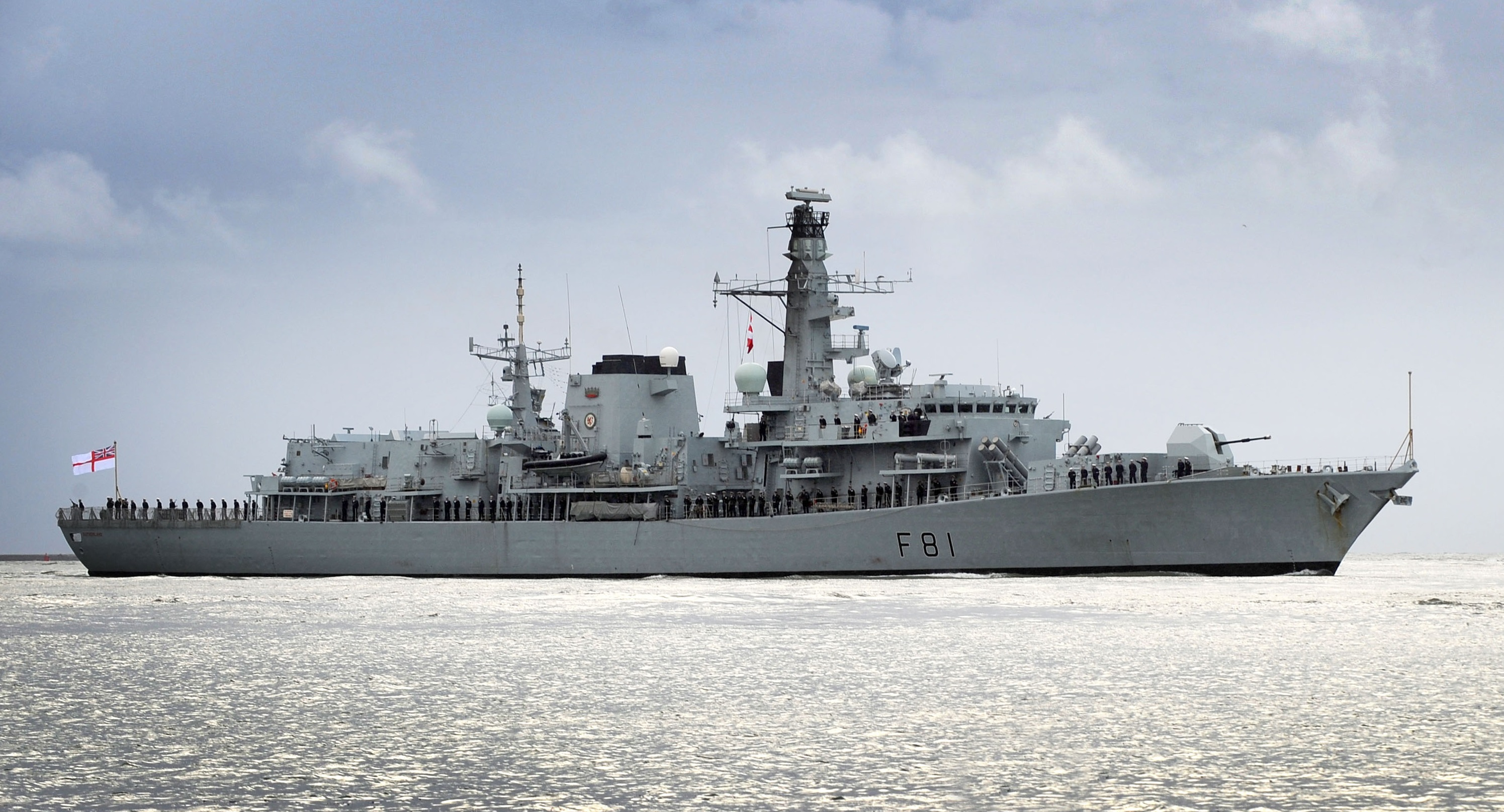
- HMS Sutherland in December 2012

Class overview
- Name: Type 23 frigate
- Builders: Yarrow Shipbuilders and Swan Hunter
- Operators: Royal Navy; Chilean Navy
- Preceded by: Type 22-class frigate
- Succeeded by: Type 26-class frigate; Type 31-class frigate; Type 32-class frigate (cancelled)
- Cost: £130 million per ship
- In commission: 24 November 1987
- Planned: 16
- Completed: 16
- Active: 5 Royal Navy, 3 Chilean Navy
- Retired: 8 (Royal Navy)

General characteristics
- Type: Anti-submarine warfare frigate
- Displacement: 4,900 t (4,800 long tons)
- Length: 133.0 m (436 ft 4 in)
- Beam: 16.1 m (52 ft 10 in)
- Draught: 7.3 m (23 ft 11 in)
- Propulsion: CODLAG: 4 × 1,510 kW (2,025 hp) Paxman Valenta 12CM diesel generators (Non-PGMU ships); 4 × 1,650 kW (2,210 shp) MTU 12V4000 M53 diesel generators (PGMU ships); 2 × GEC electric motors delivering 2,980 kW (3,996 hp) each; 2 × Rolls-Royce Marine Spey SM1C delivering 19,500 kW (26,150 hp)
- Speed: In excess of 28 knots (52 km/h; 32 mph)
- Range: 7,500 nmi (14,000 km; 9,000 mi) at 15 kn (28 km/h; 17 mph)
- Boats & landing craft carried: 2 × Pacific 24 RIBs
- Complement: 185 (accommodation for up to 205)
- Electronic warfare & decoys: UAT Mod 1; Seagnat; Type 182 towed torpedo decoy; Surface Ship Torpedo Defence
- Armament: Anti-air missiles: 1 × 32-cell Sea Ceptor GWS 35 Vertical Launching System (VLS) canisters for 32 missiles (1–25+ km) (replaced original Sea Wolf SAM); Anti-ship missiles: 2 × quad Harpoon Block 1C (originally fit, retired from most ships 2023, retained on F229 as of late 2024); being replaced by Naval Strike Missile (fit to F79, F82 & F239 as of early 2025); Anti-submarine torpedoes: 2 × twin 12.75 in (324 mm) Sting Ray torpedo tubes; Guns: 1 × BAE 4.5-inch Mk 8 naval gun; 2 × 30 mm DS30M Mk2 guns, or, 2 × 30 mm DS30B guns; 2 × Miniguns (replaced by Browning .50 caliber heavy machine guns as of 2023); 4 × General-purpose machine guns
- Aircraft carried: 1 × Wildcat HMA2, armed with: 2 × anti-submarine torpedoes or Martlet anti-ship (ASM)/air-to-air missiles, initially deployed with RN carrier strike group helicopters in 2021; Sea Venom ASM reached initial operating capability in 2025 and is projected to achieve full operational capability in 2026.; or; 1 × Westland Merlin HM2, armed with; 4 × anti-submarine torpedoes; Plus; 2 x Peregrine ISR UAV (from mid-2024 on F229)
- Aviation facilities: Flight deck; Enclosed hangar

The Type 23 frigate or Duke class is a class of frigates built for the United Kingdom's Royal Navy. The ships are named after British Dukes, thus leading to the class being commonly known as the Duke class. The first Type 23, HMS Norfolk, was commissioned in 1989, and the sixteenth, HMS St Albans was commissioned in June 2002. They form the core of the Royal Navy's destroyer and frigate fleet and serve alongside the Type 45 air defence destroyers. They were designed for anti-submarine warfare, but have seen a range of duties. Five Type 23 frigates remain in service with the Royal Navy, with three vessels having been sold to the Chilean Navy and eight being retired since 2021.

In 2019, The Royal Navy announced that the Type 23 frigates would be replaced by the Type 26 and the Type 31 frigates. As of 2021 it was anticipated that HMS St Albans would be the last to retire from the Royal Navy, in 2035. However, the 2026 Defence Investment Plan moved that date up to 2033 as more and more of the frigates were proving no longer to be seaworthy.

== Development ==
When first conceived in the late 1970s, the Type 23 was intended to be a light anti-submarine frigate with a towed array sonar to counter Soviet nuclear submarines operating in the North Atlantic. The Type 23 would be replacing the Leander-class frigates (which had entered service in the 1960s) and the Type 21-class frigate (a general purpose design that had recently entered service) as the backbone of the Royal Navy's surface ship anti-submarine force. Concept designs were created by David Andrews RCNC in the MoD's Forward Design Group. The procurement of the class was announced in the 1981 Defence White Paper as "simpler and cheaper than the Type 22 [with] its characteristics... framed with an eye to the export market as well as Royal Navy needs."

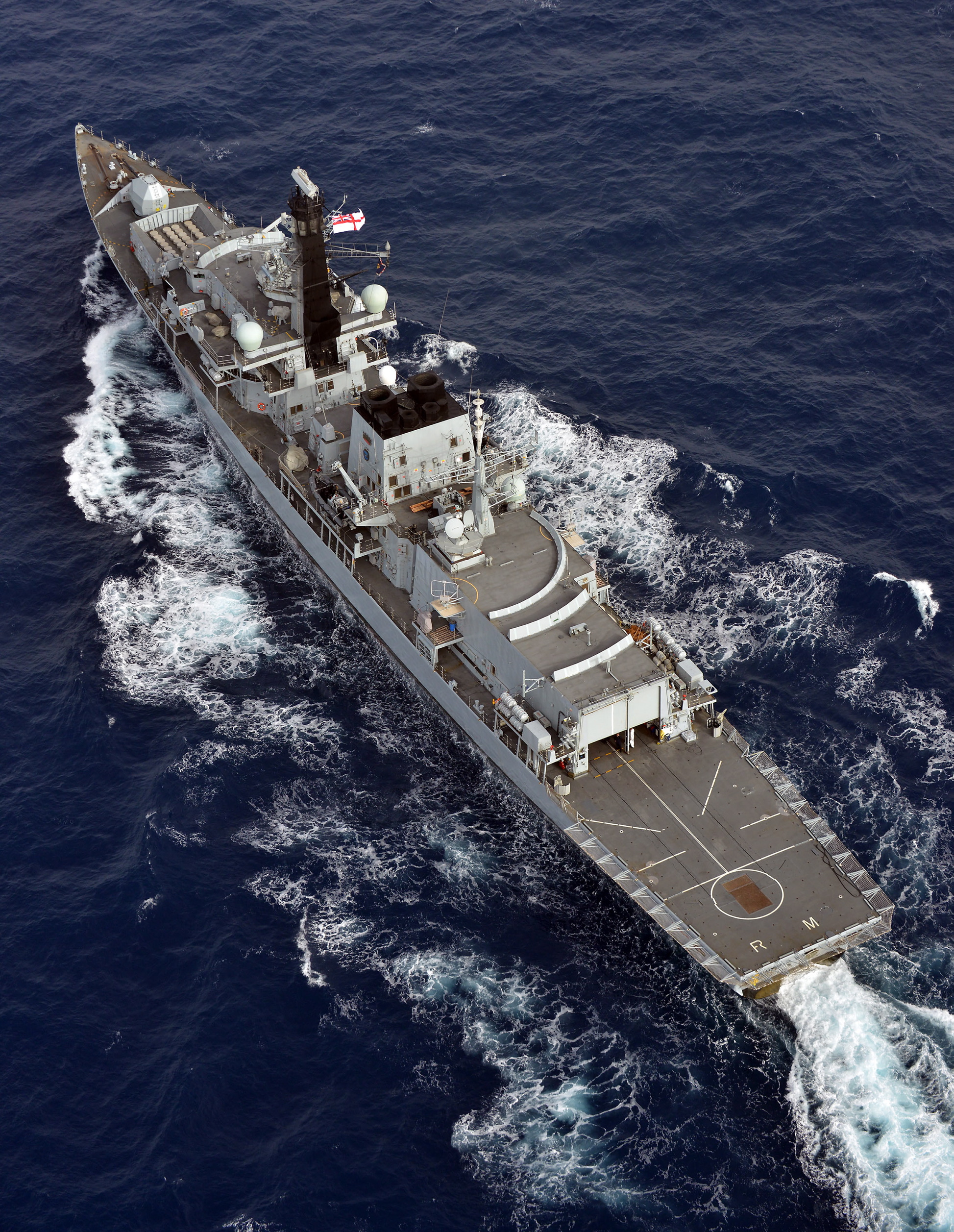
Overhead view of HMS Richmond in August 2013

The ship was designed by the Royal Corps of Naval Constructors, in close partnership with the prime contractor, Yarrow Shipbuilders. Bill Sanders RCNC was the MoD's Project Director. John van Griethuysen RCNC developed the hull form. Les Shepherd RCNC led on the overall layout.

No anti-air warfare system was planned, however the lessons learned during the Falklands War led to the introduction of the vertically launched Sea Wolf missile; In June 1984 BAe Dynamics was awarded a development contract for the missile system. Unlike conventional Sea Wolf, the missile is boosted vertically until it clears the ship's superstructure, and then turns to fly directly to the target. Consequently, the ship's structure does not impose no-fire directions that would delay or inhibit missile firing in a conventionally launched system. With the addition of Harpoon surface-to-surface missiles and a medium calibre gun for naval gunfire support, the Type 23 had evolved into a more complex and balanced vessel optimised for general warfare, which introduced a host of new technologies and concepts to the Royal Navy. These included extensive radar cross-section reduction design measures, automation to substantially reduce crew size, a combined diesel-electric and gas (CODLAG) propulsion system providing very quiet running for anti-submarine operations and a large range.

In December 1986 the procurement of a Ferranti command and control system was cancelled as the specification was deemed to be insufficient to meet the demands of a modern warship, particularly the processing demands of the towed sonar array. Dowty-Sema won a contract for a replacement command and control system in August 1989, however, the delay meant early Type 23s entered service without the capability to use the Sea Wolf missile system in combat.

It was reported in 1998 to the House of Commons that: "Type 23 frigates achieved approximately 85–89 percent average availability for operational service in [the previous] five years with the exception of 1996 when the figure dropped to just over 80 per cent due to a number of ships experiencing a particular defect. This discounts time spent in planned maintenance."

Unlike the Type 45 destroyer, the Type 23 frigate does not have the capability to act as a flagship.

=== Programme costs ===
Prior to the Falklands War the cost of the Type 23 frigates was estimated at £75 million each in September 1980 (equivalent to £322 million in 2025) Changes following the experiences in the Falklands, including improved damage control and fire precautions, led to an increased cost estimated at £110 million (equivalent to £358 million) By 2001, the Ministry of Defence said the cost of HMS Norfolk was £135.449 million and the remaining ships would have a final cost between £60 million and £96 million each. The Ministry of Defence said in 1998 that the Merlin ASW helicopter was costing them £97M each (this was for an order for 44 airframes), and that this was 57% of the cost of Type 23. From this it can be calculated that the cost of Type 23 was £170.1M each. The Government's declared policy for construction contracts for Type 23 was "...competition, the aim being to secure best value for money for the defence budget." while maintaining "sufficient warship-building capacity to meet likely future defence requirements and a competitive base"

HMS Norfolk was the first of the class to enter service, commissioned into the fleet on 1 June 1990 at a cost of £135.449 million; later vessels cost £60–96 million.

== Upgrades and future technologies ==
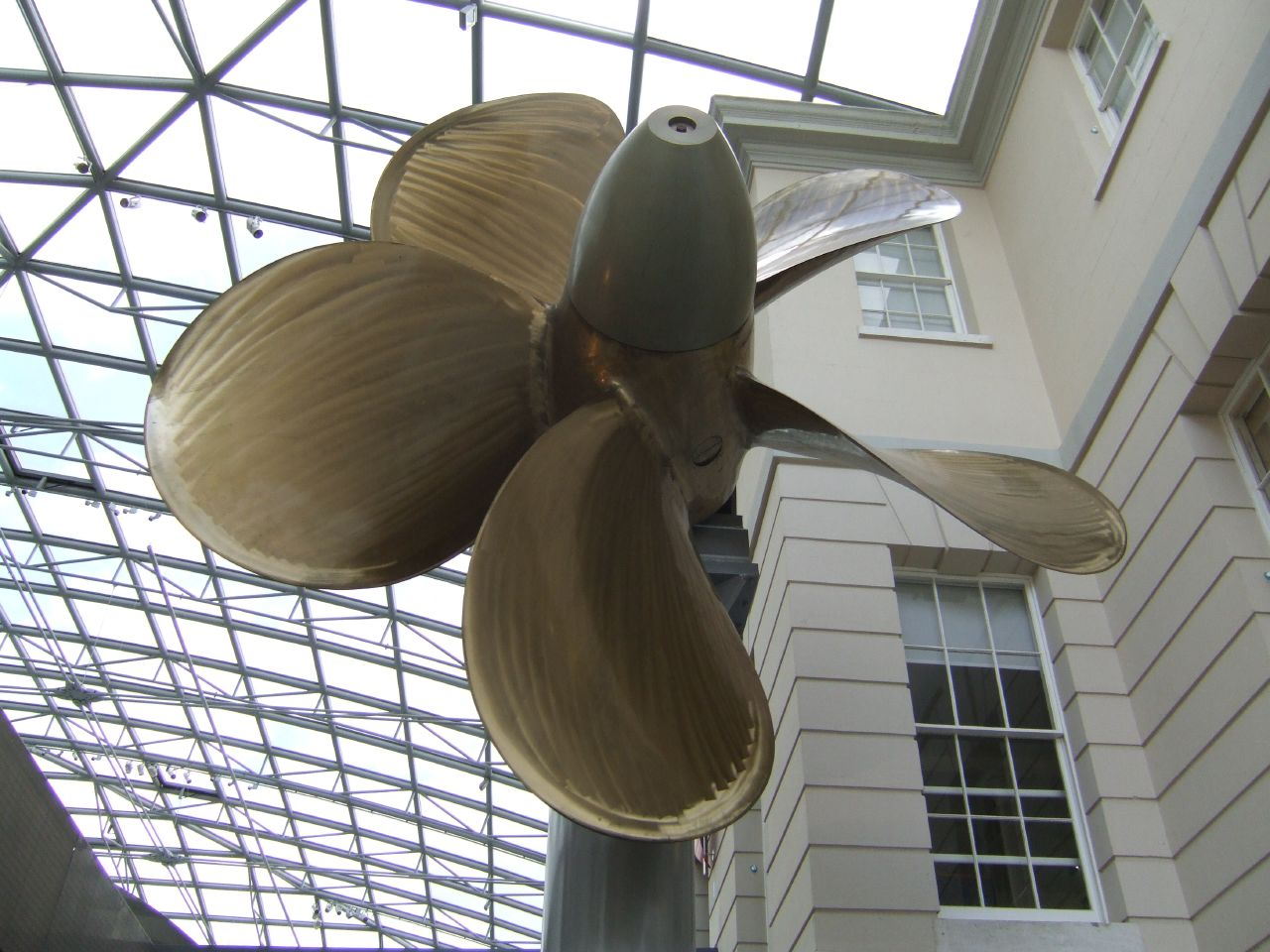
The Type 23's propeller is specially designed to reduce underwater noise during anti-submarine operations.

=== Mid-life refit ===
The class underwent mid-life refits which lasted 12–18 months and cost £15-20m. Aside from refurbishment of the mess decks and drive train, the ships are being retrofitted with a transom flap which can add up to one knot (1.9 km/h; 1.2 mph) to the top speed and reduce fuel consumption by 13%, and Intersleek anti-fouling paint which added two knots (3.7 km/h; 2.3 mph) to the top speed of the carrier Ark Royal. Although the top speed of the Duke class is commonly quoted as 28 knots, the caption of an official Navy photo suggests that Lancaster was capable of 32 knots even before her mid-life refit. From 2000, the Sea Wolf Mid Life Update (SWMLU) improved the sensors and guidance of the missiles, point defences awere further improved with remotely operated 30 mm guns, and Mod 1 of the Mk8 main gun with an all-electric loading system and a smaller radar cross-section. The communications and command systems were also upgraded.

A further Life Extension (LIFEX) Upkeep project saw the Sea Wolf missiles replaced with the new Sea Ceptor anti-air defence missiles; these were first test-fired from HMS Argyll on 4 September 2017.

=== Sonar 2087 ===
Sonar 2087 is described by its manufacturer as "a towed-array system that enables Type 23 frigates to hunt the latest submarines at considerable distances and locate them beyond the range at which they [submarines] can launch an attack." Sonar 2087 was fitted to eight Type 23 frigates in mid-life refits between 2004 and 2012; the five oldest Type 23 frigates, HMS Montrose, Monmouth, Iron Duke, Lancaster and Argyll were not to receive Sonar 2087. These ships continued to be employed across the normal range of standing Royal Navy deployments. The Chilean Navy procured a number of Sonar 2087 towed arrays from Thales Underwater Systems to equip its multipurpose frigates.

=== Artisan 3D radar ===
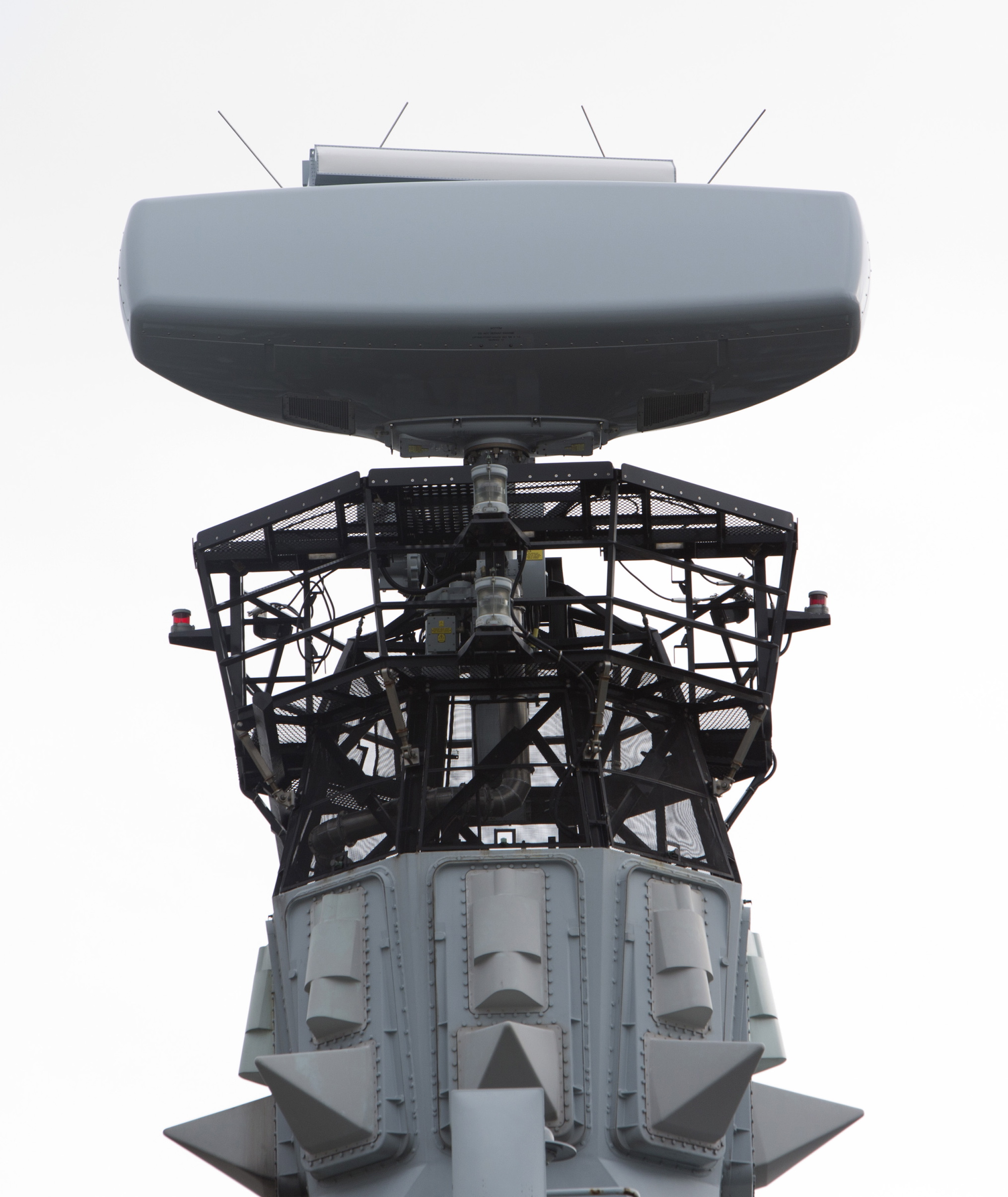
Type 997 Artisan 3D radar on HMS Argyll following her 2010 refit

The Type 23's original medium-range radar was replaced by BAE Systems Type 997 Artisan 3D radar; the project was worth £100 million and the contract was announced on 4 August 2008. It is a medium-range radar designed to be capable of operating effectively in littoral zones and improving air-defence, anti-surface (anti-ship) and air traffic management capabilities of the Type 23 frigates. The radar is also designed to combat complex jammers. HMS Iron Duke was the first Type 23 frigate to receive the Artisan radar during her refit in 2012–13.

It is claimed the radar is five times more capable than the Type 996 radar it replaces.

=== Common Anti-Air Modular Missile ===
CAMM(M), the maritime variant of the Common Anti-Air Modular Missile, started to replace the Sea Wolf missiles on the Type 23 frigates from 2016. CAMM(M) has a longer range of 1–25+ km compared to the 1–10 km offered by the Sea Wolf missile. An option exists to give the missile a surface-attack capability, though it is currently understood the Royal Navy will not take that option, because of cost. Like Sea Wolf, CAMM(M) will be VLS launched; however due to its design, CAMM(M) can be packed much more tightly into the VLS, with up to four CAMM(M) fitting into the space occupied by one Sea Wolf missile. CAMM(M) is known as Sea Ceptor in Royal Navy service.

=== Martlet Lightweight Multirole Missile ===
On an unspecified date in early 2019, HMS Sutherland tested a modified mounting for the 30mm cannon which incorporated a launcher for five 'Martlet' Lightweight Multirole Missiles, by firing four of them at a small speedboat target at the Aberporth range in Wales. The concept of mounting the missile alongside the 30mm Bushmaster cannon was tested just 5 months after the idea's conception.

The intended role of the Martlet is to further extend the Type 23's capabilities against small, fast moving targets beyond the current 30mm, GPMG and Minigun options to provide a long range 'stand-off' ability. However, a 2023 report suggested that the tests had not been deemed successful due to efflux management issues on the Type 23. The missile is therefore likely to be limited to employment on the Wildcat helicopter.

=== Anti-ship missile ===
In March 2019, a study commenced for an interim replacement for the ageing Harpoon anti-ship missiles, until completion of the Anglo-French Future Cruise/Anti-Ship Weapon (FC/ASW) programme which was scheduled to enter service in the 2030s. The interim replacement missile was originally planned to be fitted to five of the newer Type 23 frigates.

In November 2021, then First Sea Lord, Admiral Tony Radakin, said that the program had been paused and would likely be cancelled. In February 2022, the project was cancelled. However, in July 2022 the Defence Secretary confirmed that the program had been restarted. In November 2022, it was announced that the Royal Navy would receive the Naval Strike Missile (NSM), which will be fitted to a total of 11 vessels, both Type 23 frigates and Type 45 destroyers.

In 2021, it was reported that only two frigates, Montrose and Kent, were deployed with a full load of eight Harpoon canisters per ship. In August 2022, it was reported that in preparation for her planned deployment to the Persian Gulf to replace HMS Montrose, HMS Lancaster had also been fitted with eight Harpoon anti-ship missiles.

== Weapons, countermeasures, capabilities and sensors ==
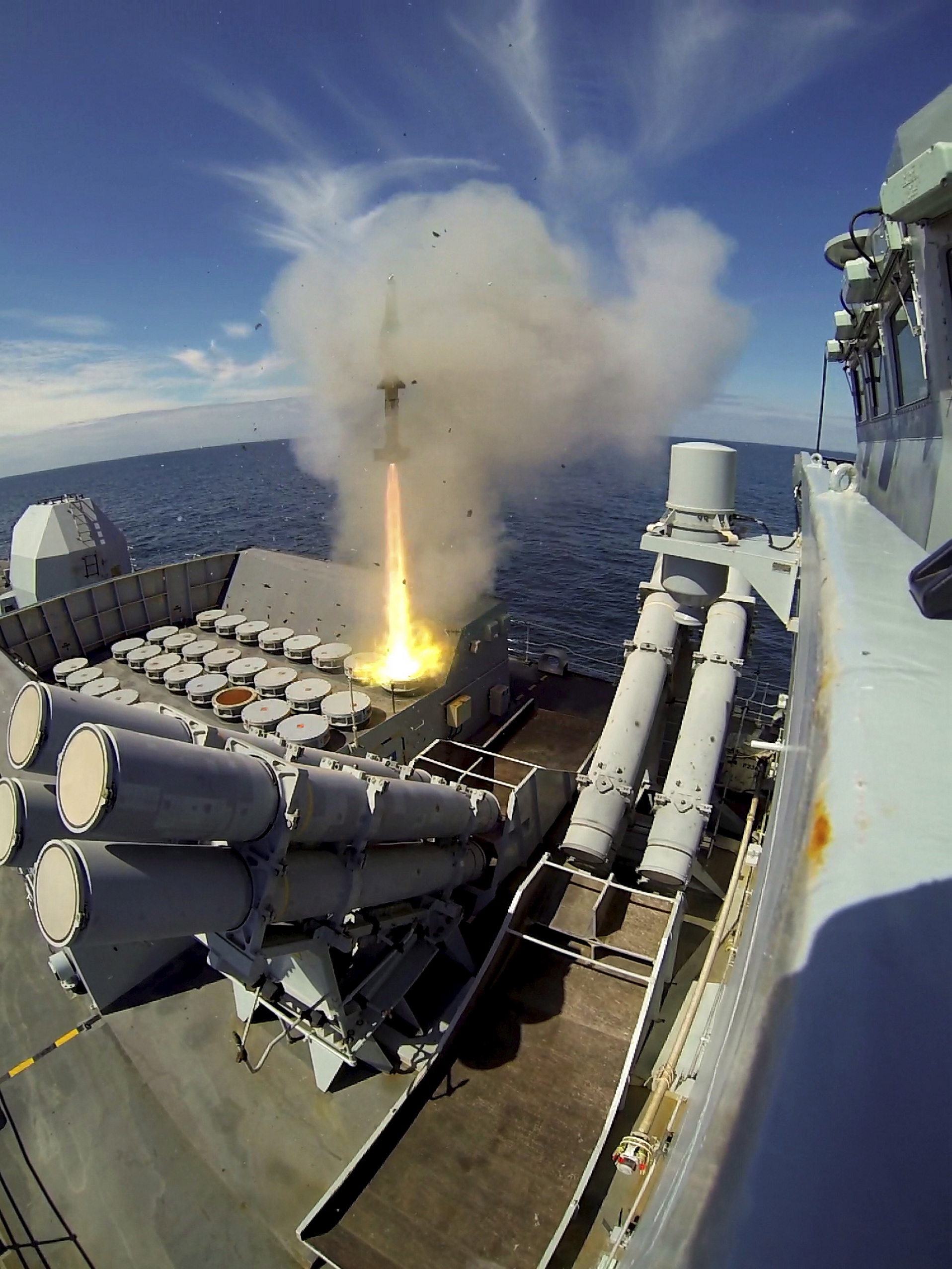
HMS Montrose firing a Sea Wolf missile

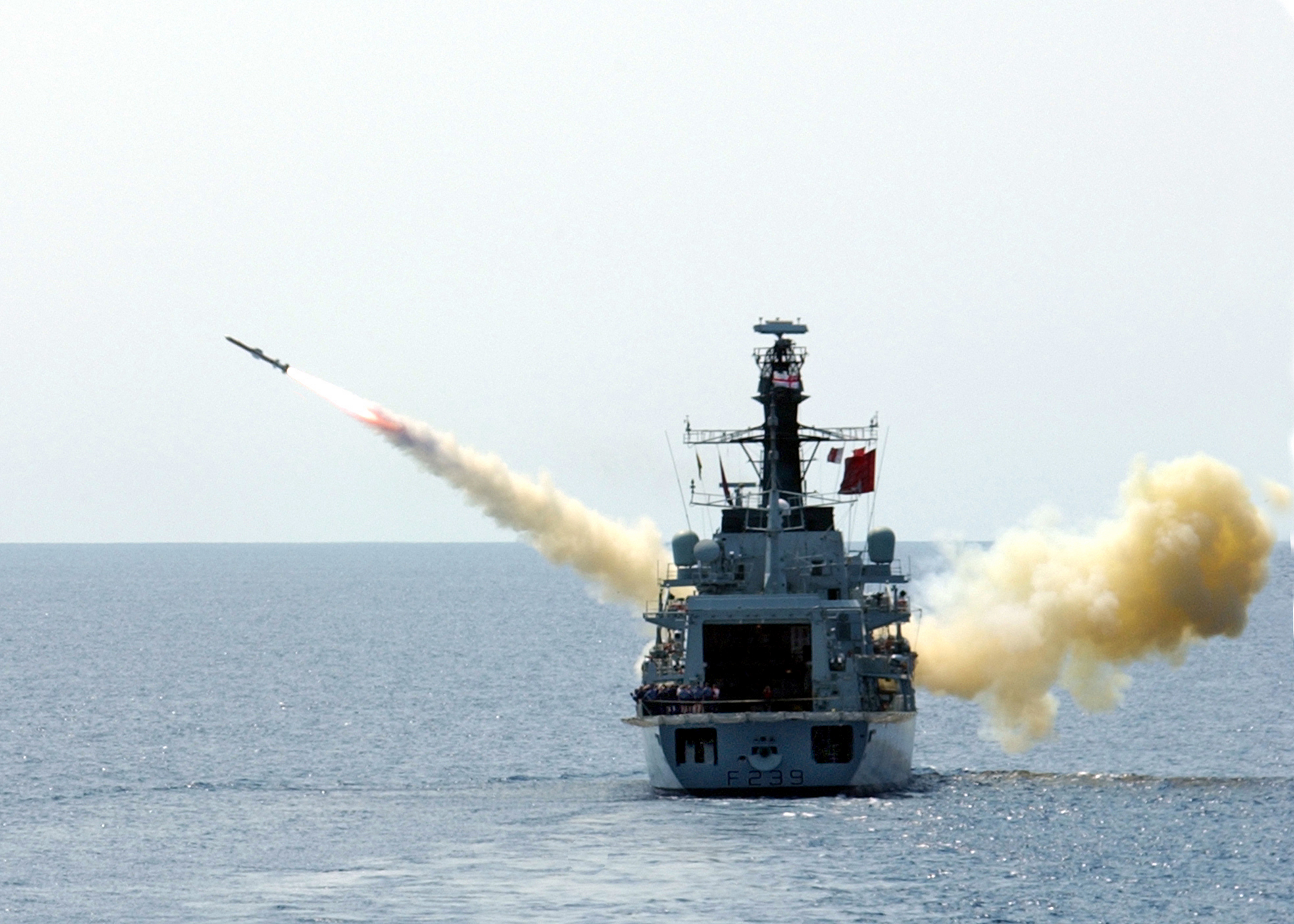
HMS Richmond firing a Harpoon anti-ship missile

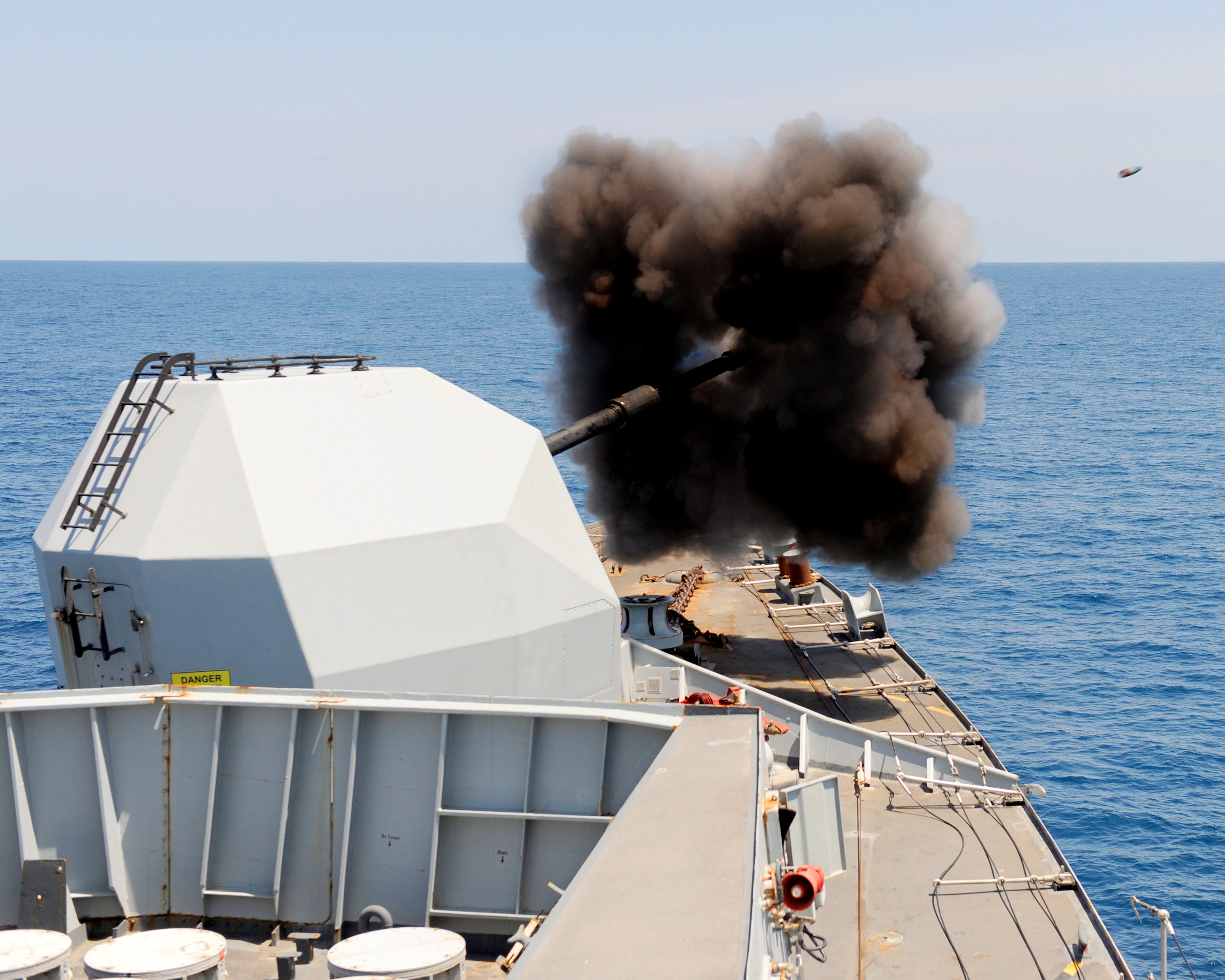
HMS Northumberland fires her 4.5-inch Mark 8 naval gun

=== Anti-air warfare ===
- Type 997 Artisan 3D radar installed/being installed on 12 of 13 vessels replacing previous Type 996 Mod 1, 3D surveillance and target indication radar.
- 12 of 13 Royal Navy frigates (plus the Chilean vessels) upgraded with 32-cell Sea Ceptor GWS.35 VLS canisters (range of over 25 kilometres; 16 mi) as replacement for the previous Sea Wolf SAM. HMS Argyll was the first ship to receive Sea Ceptor, completing refit in February 2017. As of 2021 in addition to Argyll, Westminster, Montrose, Northumberland, Kent, Lancaster, Richmond and Portland had all received Sea Ceptor systems. Somerset returned to service with Sea Ceptor in March 2022, and Iron Duke followed in May 2023. St Albans and Sutherland are the final frigates to receive the upgrade, with Sutherland having begun her refit in April 2021. The 2021 defence white paper announced that Monmouth will not receive the upgrade and, together with Montrose, would be retired early. Monmouth was formally withdrawn from service in June 2021, followed by Argyll and Westminster in 2024. Lancaster was decommissioned in late 2025 following completion of duties in the Gulf in and Richmond and Iron Duke were also withdrawn in 2026 leaving the Royal Navy with just 5 remaining Frigates available for active service.

=== Anti-ship warfare (missiles) ===
- Up to eight Harpoon anti-ship missile launchers (apart from those fitted to HMS Lancaster (F229), withdrawn in 2023/24; being replaced on eleven Type 23 frigates and Type 45 destroyers by the Naval Strike Missile - NSM; NSM fitted to F79, F82 and F239 as of early 2025).
- Up to one embarked Agusta Westland AW159 Wildcat helicopter equipped with Martlet multirole missiles (as of 2021) or Sea Venom anti-ship missiles (initial operating capability from October 2025 and full operating capability projected from 2026).

=== Anti-submarine warfare ===
- A Thales Underwater Systems Type 2050 bow sonar scheduled to be replaced by an Ultra Electronics Type 2150 next generation ASW bow sonar in due course.
- An Ultra Electronics Type 2031Z towed sonar initially fit on Type 23 frigates – no longer in RN service.
- A Type 2087 towed sonar now fit to eight of the Type 23 frigates (F237, F238, F239, F78, F79, F81, F82, F83).
- 2× twin 12.75 in (324 mm) magazine launched torpedo tubes built by SEA Ltd for anti-submarine Sting Ray torpedoes. The tubes are magazine reloaded.
- Up to one embarked Agusta Westland AW159 Wildcat or one AgustaWestland EH101 Merlin helicopter can be equipped with 2-4× anti-submarine Sting Ray torpedoes respectively. An embarked Merlin HM2 helicopter is equipped with its own dipping sonar, sonobuoys and radars; For submarine targets, Wildcat relies on the ship's sensors.

=== Guns ===
- 1 × BAE Systems 4.5-inch Mark 8 naval gun.
- 2 × 30mm DS30M Mark 2 Automated Small Calibre Guns or 30mm DS30B guns.
- 2 × Miniguns (replaced by Browning .50 caliber heavy machine guns as of 2023)
- 4 × General-purpose machine guns.

=== Countermeasures ===
- The Seagnat decoy system allows for the seduction and distraction of radar guided weapons, through active and passive means.
- Type 182 towed torpedo decoys.
- Type 2070 towed torpedo decoy system.
- Thales defence Scorpion Electronic Counter Measures/UAF-1 ESM Jammer. Used to confuse or block enemy radar making the Type 23 frigate harder to detect and/or lock onto by enemy radar/sonar guided weapons.

=== Electronic systems ===
- Navigation: Kelvin Hughes Radar Type 1007 and Racal Decca Type 1008.
- fire-control system: Sperry Sea Archer 30 optronic surveillance/director'
- Combat Management System: BAE Systems Command System DNA(2)'

=== Additional capabilities ===
- The Type 23 frigates have sufficient space to embark a small detachment of Royal Marines and their equipment.

== Ships ==
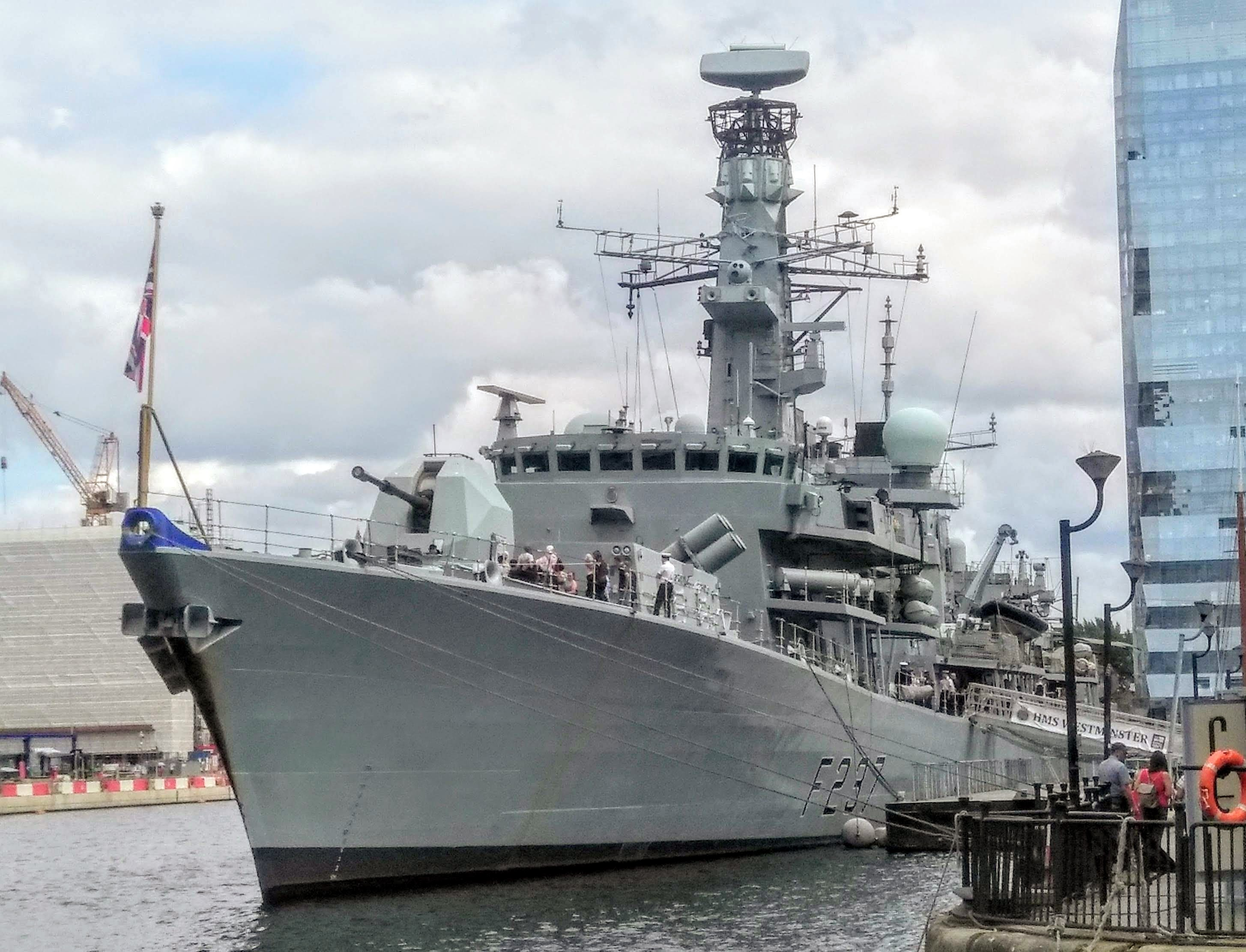
HMS Westminster moored at South Quay in London

Although the Type 23 is officially the "Duke" class, and includes such famous names as HMS Iron Duke (which had been the name of the battleship HMS Iron Duke, Admiral Jellicoe's flagship at the Battle of Jutland), five of the names had previously been used on classes known as the "County class": Kent and Norfolk were names given both to 1960s guided-missile destroyers and Second World War-era County-class heavy cruisers, while Monmouth, Lancaster, Kent and Argyll revived names carried by First World War-era Monmouth-class armoured cruisers. This use of Ducal and County names broke a tradition of alphabetical names for escort ships which had run in two – not unbroken – cycles from the L-class destroyers of 1913 to the Daring-class destroyers of 1950; this progression was revived with the Amazon-class Type 21 frigates of 1972–1975, and continued with B and C names for most of the Type 22 frigates of 1976–1989. However, the D names have since been used for the new Type 45 Daring-class destroyers.

On 21 July 2004, in the Delivering Security in a Changing World review of defence spending, Defence Secretary Geoff Hoon announced that Norfolk, Marlborough and Grafton were to be paid off. In 2005 it was announced that these three vessels would be sold to the Chilean Navy, to be delivered in 2008. In September 2005 BAE Systems was awarded a £134 million GBP contract to prepare the frigates for transfer. ex-Marlborough, ex-Norfolk and ex-Grafton were sold to Chile for a total of £134 million. The letter of intent for purchase was signed in December 2004, followed by a formal contract on 7 September 2005. ex-Norfolk was handed over by the Defence Logistics Organisation and BAE Systems and commissioned into the Chilean Navy on 22 November 2006, and named Almirante Cochrane (FF-05) (after Lord Cochrane, a naval hero to both the British and Chileans). Ex-Grafton was delivered to Chilean Navy on 28 March 2007 at Portsmouth and renamed Almirante Lynch (FF-07). Ex-Marlborough was delivered to Chilean Navy on 28 May 2008 at Portsmouth and renamed Almirante Condell (FF-06). As of 2021, these three ships remain in service with the Chilean Navy and were upgraded by Lockheed Martin Canada by the local ASMAR shipbuilding company.

The oldest ship in Royal Navy service, Iron Duke, is classified as a General Purpose ship, and is primarily homeported at Devonport. The remainder are equipped with the Type 2087 Towed Array Sonar, and are primarily tasked with the anti-submarine warfare mission. These six ships are based primarily at Devonport. The Type 23 ships in the Royal Navy are due to be replaced in service by the Type 26 ASW and Type 31 general purpose frigates. The 2021 defence white paper indicated that both Montrose and Monmouth would be withdrawn early. Monmouth, having had the planned life-extension refit cancelled, and been laid up since 2018, was withdrawn from service in June 2021. In 2024, it was indicated that both HMS Westminster and HMS Argyll would also be retired. In 2021 in a written answer provided to the House of Commons Select Defence Committee, the First Sea Lord, Admiral Tony Radakin, suggested that older frigates of the class would be retained in service longer than anticipated in order to ensure that escort numbers did not fall below 17 ships (6 destroyers and 11 frigates) and start to rise above 19 escorts beginning in 2026. However, personnel shortages and the age of some ships ended up making this cost prohibitive. In November 2024, the government indicated that HMS Northumberland would also be withdrawn from service by March 2025. This was followed by the withdrawal of HMS Iron Duke and HMS Richmond in 2026 due to their needing major structural repairs, thus reducing the Type 23 fleet to just five ships with the entry into service to their replacements still sometime away.

Name	Pennant No.	Type	Builder	Laid down	Launched	Commissioned	Mid-life upgrade	Decommissioned	Status
Royal Navy
Norfolk	F230		Marconi Marine (YSL), Scotstoun	14 December 1985	10 July 1987	1 June 1990	—N/a	15 April 2005	Sold to Chile as Almirante Cochrane
Marlborough	F233		Swan Hunter, Wallsend	22 October 1987	21 January 1989	14 June 1991	—N/a	8 July 2005	Sold to Chile as Almirante Condell
Argyll	F231	GP	Marconi Marine (YSL), Scotstoun	20 March 1987	8 April 1989	31 May 1991	Jun 2015 to Feb 2017	May 2024	Awaiting disposal
Lancaster	F229	GP	Marconi Marine (YSL), Scotstoun	18 December 1987	24 May 1990	1 May 1992	March 2017 – December 2019	6 December 2025	Awaiting disposal
Iron Duke	F234	GP	Marconi Marine (YSL), Scotstoun	12 December 1988	2 March 1991	20 May 1993	From January 2019 - June 2023		Out of service and decommissioning announced
Monmouth	F235	GP	Marconi Marine (YSL), Scotstoun	1 June 1989	23 November 1991	24 September 1993	—N/a	30 June 2021	Scrapped 2025
Montrose	F236	GP	Marconi Marine (YSL), Scotstoun	1 November 1989	31 July 1992	2 June 1994	October 2014 – July 2017	17 April 2023	Scrapped 2026
Westminster	F237	ASW	Swan Hunter, Wallsend	18 January 1991	4 February 1992	13 May 1994	November 2014 – January 2017	May 2024	Scrapped 2026
Northumberland	F238	ASW	Swan Hunter, Wallsend	4 April 1991	4 April 1992	29 November 1994	May 2016 – May 2018	12 March 2025	Scrapped 2026
Richmond	F239	ASW	Swan Hunter, Wallsend	16 February 1992	6 April 1993	22 June 1995	August 2017 – February 2020	13 July 2026	Out of service and decommissioning announced
Somerset	F82	ASW	Marconi Marine (YSL), Scotstoun	12 October 1992	25 June 1994	20 September 1996	November 2018 – March 2022		In Active Service
Grafton	F80		Marconi Marine (YSL), Scotstoun	13 May 1993	5 November 1994	29 May 1997	—N/a	31 March 2006	Sold to Chile as Almirante Lynch
Sutherland	F81	ASW	Marconi Marine (YSL), Scotstoun	14 October 1993	9 March 1996	4 July 1997	December 2020 - March 2024		In Active Service
Kent	F78	ASW	Marconi Marine (YSL), Scotstoun	16 April 1997	27 May 1998	8 June 2000	January 2017 – August 2018		Refit at Devonport
Portland	F79	ASW	Marconi Marine (YSL), Scotstoun	14 January 1998	15 May 1999	3 May 2001	February 2018 – March 2021		In Active Service
St Albans	F83	ASW	Marconi Marine (YSL), Scotstoun	18 April 1999	6 May 2000	6 June 2002	July 2019 – November 2023		In Active Service
Chilean Navy
Almirante Cochrane	FF05	ASW	Marconi Marine (YSL), Scotstoun	14 December 1985	10 July 1987	22 November 2006	March 2018 to November 2019		In active service
Almirante Condell	FF06	ASW	Swan Hunter, Wallsend	22 October 1987	21 January 1989	28 May 2008	September 2020 to October 2021		In active service
Almirante Lynch	FF07	ASW	Marconi Marine (YSL), Scotstoun	13 May 1993	5 November 1994	28 March 2007	June 2019 to December 2020		In active service

== Operational history ==
In April 2003 Richmond was one of 3 Royal Navy warships (2 x Type 23 and 1 x Type 22 frigates) on the gun line for the Al Faw assault, undertaking Naval Gunfire Support (NGS) for allied troops as they entered Iraq.

In 2011, HMS Iron Duke destroyed a gun battery outside the besieged city of Misrata, Libya. She also fired star shells into the night sky to illuminate pro-Gaddafi positions to allow NATO aircraft to destroy them.

On 9 March 2024 Richmond used its Sea Ceptor missiles to shoot down two Houthi attack drones. This was the first use of Sea Ceptor in operational circumstances by the class.

== In fiction ==
- HMS Westminster was used for the Type 23 interior shots in the James Bond film Tomorrow Never Dies in three different roles as HMS Chester, HMS Devonshire and HMS Bedford. For the exterior shots a Type 23 model was constructed.
- The ITV series Making Waves was set aboard the Type 23 frigate HMS Suffolk (which was portrayed by HMS Grafton).
- HMS Montrose and HMS Monmouth were used to portray the interior and exterior shots of the fictional HMS Monarch for the film Command Approved which was the centre piece of the now closed Action Stations at Portsmouth Historic Dockyard, Portsmouth, England.
- The fictional HMS Beaufort is the centrepiece of British author Mike Lunnon-Wood's novel King's Shilling. In it, HMS Beaufort is tasked to evacuate the British embassy and citizens in the Liberian capital Monrovia during the 1990s civil war.
- The TNT series The Last Ship featured a Chilean Duke-class frigate in the fourth episode of its fifth season, charging an Arleigh Burke-class destroyer and landing a hit with one of four Sea Wolf missiles.
- In 2017 for an episode in the first season of The Grand Tour, titled "Berks to the Future" TV presenter Jeremy Clarkson is shown loading a shell into the forward gun of HMS Richmond which is then depicted firing on a bug out vehicle created by co-presenter Richard Hammond.
- A fictional Type 23 frigate, named HMS Ascendant, is featured in the 2006 Doctor Who novel The Feast of the Drowned, written by Stephen Cole, featuring the Tenth Doctor and Rose Tyler. It was adapted into an audiobook by BBC Audiobooks, read by Tenth Doctor actor David Tennant, also released 2006.

== See also ==
- List of frigate classes in service

Equivalent frigates of the same era

- Halifax class
- Karel Doorman class
- Brandenburg class
- Anzac class
- Kang Ding class
- Vasco da Gama class
- Neustrashimy class
- G class
