= HMS Grafton (F80) =

Frigate of the Royal Navy

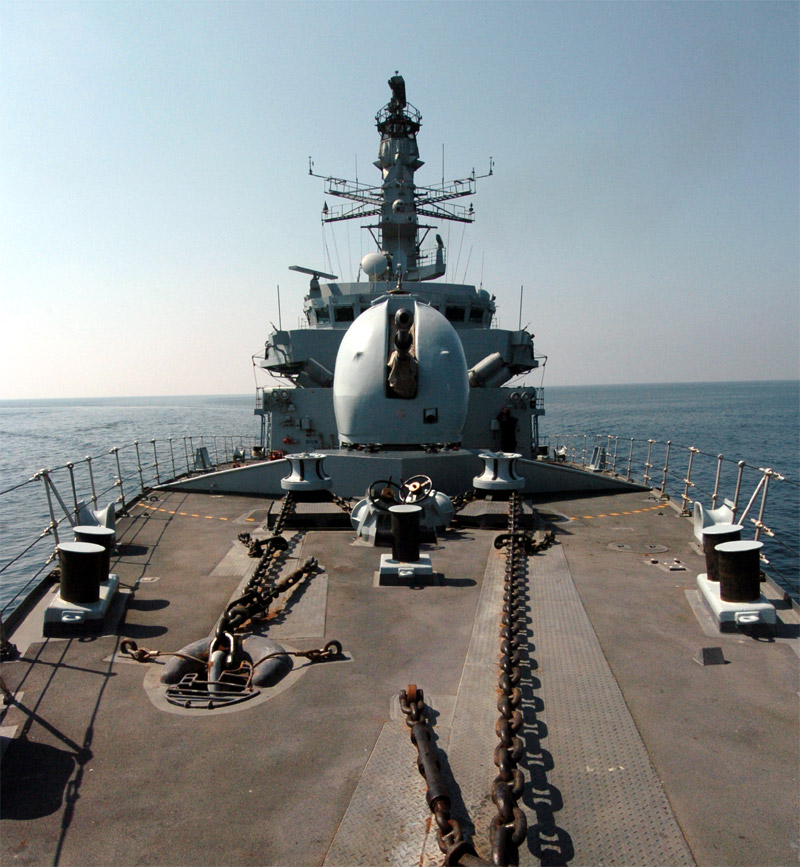
- HMS Grafton

History

United Kingdom
- Name: HMS Grafton
- Namesake: Duke of Grafton
- Ordered: January 1992
- Builder: Yarrow Shipbuilders
- Laid down: 13 May 1993
- Launched: 5 November 1994
- Commissioned: 29 May 1997
- Decommissioned: 31 March 2006
- Identification: F80
- Fate: Sold to Chile

Chile
- Name: Almirante Lynch
- Namesake: Patricio Lynch
- Commissioned: 28 March 2007
- Identification: FF-07
- Status: Active
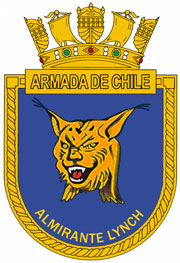
- Badge

General characteristics
- Class & type: Duke-class Type 23 frigate
- Displacement: 4,900 tonnes
- Length: 133 m (436 ft 4 in)
- Beam: 16.1 m (52 ft 10 in)
- Draught: 7.3 m (23 ft 11 in)
- Propulsion: Combined diesel-electric and gas (CODLAG); 2 × Rolls-Royce Spey boost gas-turbines; 4 × Paxman Valenta diesel engines; 2 × GEC electric motors
- Speed: 28 knots (52 km/h; 32 mph); 15 kn (28 km/h; 17 mph) on diesel-electric
- Range: 7,800 nmi (14,400 km; 9,000 mi) at 15 kn
- Complement: 185
- Armament: 2 × ASuW Harpoon quad launchers; 32 CAMM Sea Ceptor surface-to-air missiles; 1 × BAE 4.5-inch (113 mm) Mk 8 gun; 2 × Oerlikon 30 mm guns; 4 × Sting Ray torpedo tubes; Seagnat and DLF3 decoy launchers
- Aircraft carried: Eurocopter AS332 Super Puma or Eurocopter AS365 Dauphin

HMS Grafton is a Type 23 frigate formerly in service with the Royal Navy. She was the ninth vessel to bear the name, and is named after the Duke of Grafton. Ordered in January 1992, Grafton was laid down on 13 May 1993 by Yarrow Shipbuilders. The frigate was launched on 5 November 1994 and commissioned into the Royal Navy on 29 May 1997 with the pennant number F80. In 2007 the ship was transferred to Chile as Almirante Lynch and, having undergone a significant upgrade from 2019 to 2020, remains in service with the Chilean Navy.

== Design ==
Designed to replace the Leander class, the Type 23 frigate's operational role as an anti-submarine warfare platform. They are 133 metres (436 ft 4 in) long with a beam of 16.1 m (52 ft 10 in), a draught of 7.3 m (23 ft 11 in) and displaces 4,900 tonnes.

They are propelled by a combined diesel-electric and gas (CODLAG) system with two Rolls-Royce Spey boost gas turbines and four Paxman Valenta diesel engines. They are also equipped with two GEC electric motors. This gives the ships a maximum speed of 28 knots (52 km/h; 32 mph) and 15 knots (28 km/h; 17 mph) on diesel-electric. The vessels have an effective range of 7,800 nautical miles (14,400 km; 9,000 mi) at 15 knots.

=== Armament ===
Designed to replace the Leander class, the Type 23 frigate's operational role as an anti-submarine warfare platform. The design grew to encompass the Sea Wolf and Harpoon missile systems for air defence and anti-ship purposes respectively. They were also equipped with one BAE 4.5-inch (113 mm) Mk 8 gun.

For anti-submarine purposes they have four Sting Ray torpedo tubes. For anti-missile defence they have Seagnat and DFL3 decoy launchers.

== Service history ==
=== Royal Navy service ===
On 23 September 1998, while operating off the coast of Malaysia, Grafton's Lynx helicopter crashed into the sea during a night exercise, one crew member was killed.

In 2003, the ship was used in the ITV drama series Making Waves as the fictional Royal Navy warship Suffolk. In early 2004 the ship was deployed in the Persian Gulf. In July 2004, it was announced that Grafton would be one of three Type 23 frigates to be decommissioned by the end of 2006.

In June 2005, it was announced that Grafton would be sold to the Chilean Navy . During her service in the Royal Navy, her crew were awarded the freedom of the Borough of Ipswich, due to their frequent visits to the Suffolk town. On her last visit to Ipswich in 2006, the ship's bell was presented to the town as a permanent reminder of the links between Grafton and Ipswich. The bell is now on display in the reception area of the Ipswich Borough Council offices at Grafton House, named for the connection to the warship. She was decommissioned on 31 March 2006.

=== Chilean naval service ===
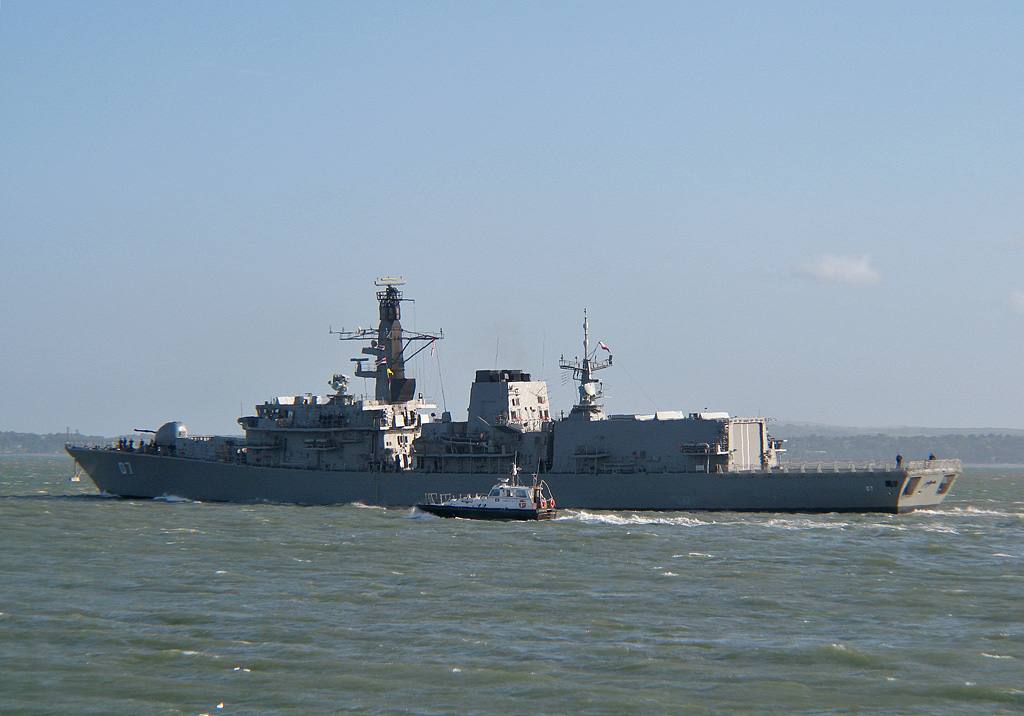
HMS Grafton after renaming as Almirante Lynch prior to delivery to the Chilean Navy

The frigate was delivered to Chilean Navy on 28 March 2007 at Portsmouth and renamed Almirante Lynch (FF-07) after Patricio Lynch.

Along with other Chilean vessels of her class, Almirante Lynch underwent a significant upgrade from June 2019 to December 2020. The CMS 330 combat management architecture was installed along TRS-4D G-Band active scanning radars and 32 CAMM Sea Ceptor vertical-launch surface-to-air missile silos to replace the previous Sea Wolf SAM system.

Almirante Lynch participated in the multinational military exercise RIMPAC 2022.

== Publications ==
- Colledge, J. J.; Warlow, Ben (2006) [1969]. Ships of the Royal Navy: The Complete Record of All Fighting Ships of the Royal Navy from the 15th Century to the Present (3rd Rev ed.). London: Chatham Publishing. ISBN 978-1-86176-281-8. OCLC 67375475.
