= HMS Monmouth (F235) =

1993 Type 23 or Duke-class frigate of the Royal Navy

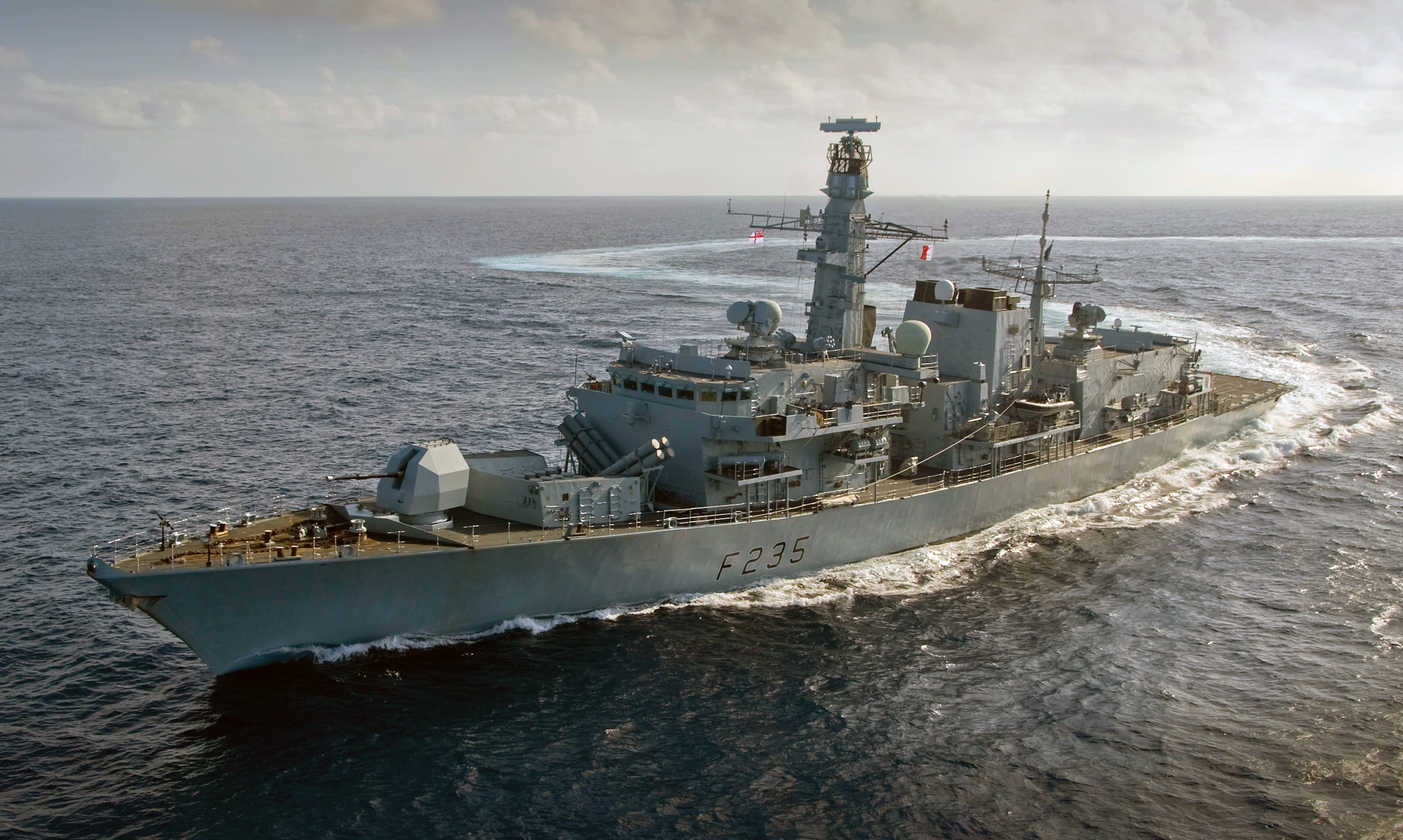
- HMS Monmouth, 2011

History

United Kingdom
- Name: HMS Monmouth
- Operator: Royal Navy
- Ordered: July 1988
- Builder: Yarrow Shipbuilders
- Laid down: 1 June 1989
- Launched: 23 November 1991
- Commissioned: 24 September 1993
- Decommissioned: 30 June 2021
- Refit: 2014–2015, major
- Home port: HMNB Devonport, Plymouth
- Identification: IMO number: 8949630; MMSI number: 234617000; Callsign: GCOC
- Motto: "Fear Nothing But God"
- Nickname(s): "The Black Duke"
- Fate: Scrapped 2025
- Badge

General characteristics
- Class & type: Type 23 frigate
- Displacement: 4,900 t (4,800 long tons; 5,400 short tons)
- Length: 133 m (436 ft 4 in)
- Beam: 16.1 m (52 ft 10 in)
- Draught: 7.3 m (23 ft 11 in)
- Propulsion: CODLAG: 4 × 1,510 kW (2,025 shp) Paxman Valenta 12CM diesel generators; 2 × GEC electric motors delivering 2,980 kW (4,000 shp); 2 × Rolls-Royce Spey SM1C delivering 23,190 kW (31,100 shp)
- Speed: In excess of 28 kn (52 km/h; 32 mph)
- Range: 7,500 nautical miles (14,000 km) at 15 kn (28 km/h)
- Complement: 185 (accommodates 205)
- Electronic warfare & decoys: UAF-1 ESM, or, UAT Mod 1; Seagnat; Type 182 towed torpedo decoy; Surface Ship Torpedo Defence
- Armament: Anti-air missiles: 1 × 32-cell Sea Wolf SAM; Anti-ship missiles: 2 × quad Harpoon launchers; Anti-submarine torpedoes: 2 × twin 12.75 in (324 mm) Sting Ray torpedo tubes; Guns: 1 × BAE 4.5 inch Mk 8 naval gun; 2 × 30 mm DS30M Mk2 guns, or, 2 × 30 mm DS30B guns; 2 × Miniguns; 4 × General-purpose machine guns
- Aircraft carried: 1 × Westland Wildcat HMA2, armed with; 2 × anti submarine torpedoes; or; 1 × Westland Merlin HM2, armed with; 4 × anti submarine torpedoes
- Aviation facilities: Flight deck; Enclosed hangar

HMS Monmouth was the sixth Duke-class Type 23 frigate of the Royal Navy. She was the seventh ship to bear the name and was launched by Lady Eaton in 1991, being commissioned two years later.

Affectionately known as "The Black Duke", Monmouth was the only ship in service with the Royal Navy that has its name painted in black (all other RN vessels have their name in red) and flew a plain black flag in addition to the ensign. This is due to the dissolution of the title and the blacking out of the coat of arms of the Duke of Monmouth in 1685 following the Monmouth Rebellion against James II of England. Until her decommissioning, Monmouth carried the most battle honours of any ship name that was serving in the Royal Navy. HMS Monmouth was decommissioned on the 30 June 2021 and departed Portsmouth to be broken up in April 2025.

== Construction and career ==
=== 1993–2000 ===
Monmouth visited Wellington, New Zealand in June 1995 in company with RFA Brambleleaf, the first UK or US warship to visit New Zealand since the 1985 ANZUS dispute.

In February 1997, while being prepared for launch in poor weather, Monmouth's Lynx helicopter slid off the side of the flight deck and sank off the Devon coast. The aircraft's crew were rescued by the ship's sea boat.

In October 1997, Monmouth, in company with RFA Orangeleaf and Surcouf, stood by off Pointe Noire in West Africa on Operation Kingfisher in readiness for evacuation in the aftermath of the First Congo War. On 11 February 1998, Monmouth was ordered to stand by off Sierra Leone as part of Operation Resilient to provide humanitarian assistance during the Sierra Leone Civil War. In 1999 Monmouth became the first major Royal Navy vessel to visit Dublin, Ireland, since the 1960s.

=== 2001–2010 ===
In early 2004 the ship was assigned to the Atlantic Patrol Task North. Between late 2004 and 2006 she was commanded by Jerry Kyd. In 2006 Monmouth underwent operational sea training, conducted by Flag Officer Sea Training, in which she spent six weeks fighting off staged attacks by ships and submarines.

Monmouth returned to berth at her home port HMNB Devonport on 3 December 2007 having completed a circumnavigation of the globe, visiting Australia, New Zealand, and Hawaii and taking part in a FPDA exercise. In 2008 she went into refit and in 2009 deployed to the Persian Gulf, returning in April 2010. On 27 May 2010, she escorted the fleet of "little ships" commemorating the 70th anniversary of Operation Dynamo, the evacuation from Dunkirk on 27 May – 4 June 1940 of approximately 340,000 British and French soldiers, and one of the most celebrated military events in British history.

=== 2011 onwards ===
Monmouth spent June 2011 in the Indian Ocean patrolling the waters off Somalia as part of the ongoing multi-national anti-piracy operations in the region. The deployment also saw her spend some time in Victoria, the capital of the Seychelles where she took part in the islands' independence celebrations.

In February 2012, Monmouth began a six-week refit period at Devonport's frigate shed, following on from a seven-month deployment in the Indian Ocean which began in 2011. For the refit, the ship was taken out of the water into an enclosed dry-dock.

In May 2013, she returned to her home port after a seven-month mission to the Persian Gulf. Monmouth also hosted an International Principal Warfare Officer's course in 2013. She participated in Exercise Joint Warrior in 2013. From October 2013, Monmouth was operating in home waters as the Fleet Ready Escort.

In June 2015, Monmouth emerged from an 18-month refit in Devonport for sea trials and made her first ever visit to Hamburg, Germany, in December.

In February 2016, Monmouth and her sister HMS Iron Duke participated in NATO exercise Dynamic Guard in Norwegian waters. In August, Monmouth, in company with HMS Tyne and RFA Argus, anchored off Bournemouth for the town's annual air festival. By September, she was exercising in Canadian waters and was involved in the rescue of an injured Canadian fisherman 100 miles (160 km) east of Nova Scotia.

In March 2017, Monmouth sailed from Devonport to relieve HMS Daring in the Persian Gulf; in May she was participating in Combined Task Force 150 when they stopped and searched a fishing boat in the Indian Ocean discovering 455 kg (1,003 lb) of cannabis and 266 kg (586 lb) of heroin. In June 2017, Monmouth's Wildcat rescued a crewman from the sunken merchant tanker Rama 2 and transferred them to RFA Cardigan Bay for treatment. She returned to the UK in time for Christmas 2017.

Monmouth was deployed on 23 August 2018 from Plymouth as escort for the aircraft carrier HMS Queen Elizabeth, as she sailed to the eastern seaboard of the United States for 'Westlant 18', during which the carrier conducted F-35 Lightning II flying trials. The task group consisted of RFA Tiderace and possibly a Royal Navy submarine. HMS Monmouth's Wildcat HMA2 helicopter, nicknamed "Blackjack", of 213 Flight, 815 NAS, became the first Wildcat to land aboard HMS Queen Elizabeth on 3 September 2018.

The ship prepared to go into refit in early 2019, and her ship's company became the Starboard crew of sister ship HMS Montrose which is forward-deployed to Bahrain until 2022. By the end of 2020 the ship was reported to have been stripped of weapons and sensors and laid up. On 22 March 2021, it was announced that both Type 23 frigates Monmouth and Montrose would be decommissioned earlier than planned as part of the Ministry of Defence's Integrated Review. As a result of this decision, Monmouth did not undergo a life extension refit as other members of her class have, and is currently awaiting disposal. Monmouth was decommissioned on 30 June 2021. She was the only Type 23 frigate - British or Chilean - to never receive the Sea Ceptor missile system. Monmouth left Portsmouth for the last time bound for Aliağa in Turkey in April 2025 to be broken up.

== Related images ==
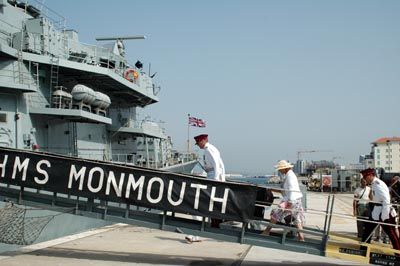
Monmouth in Gibraltar in 2006

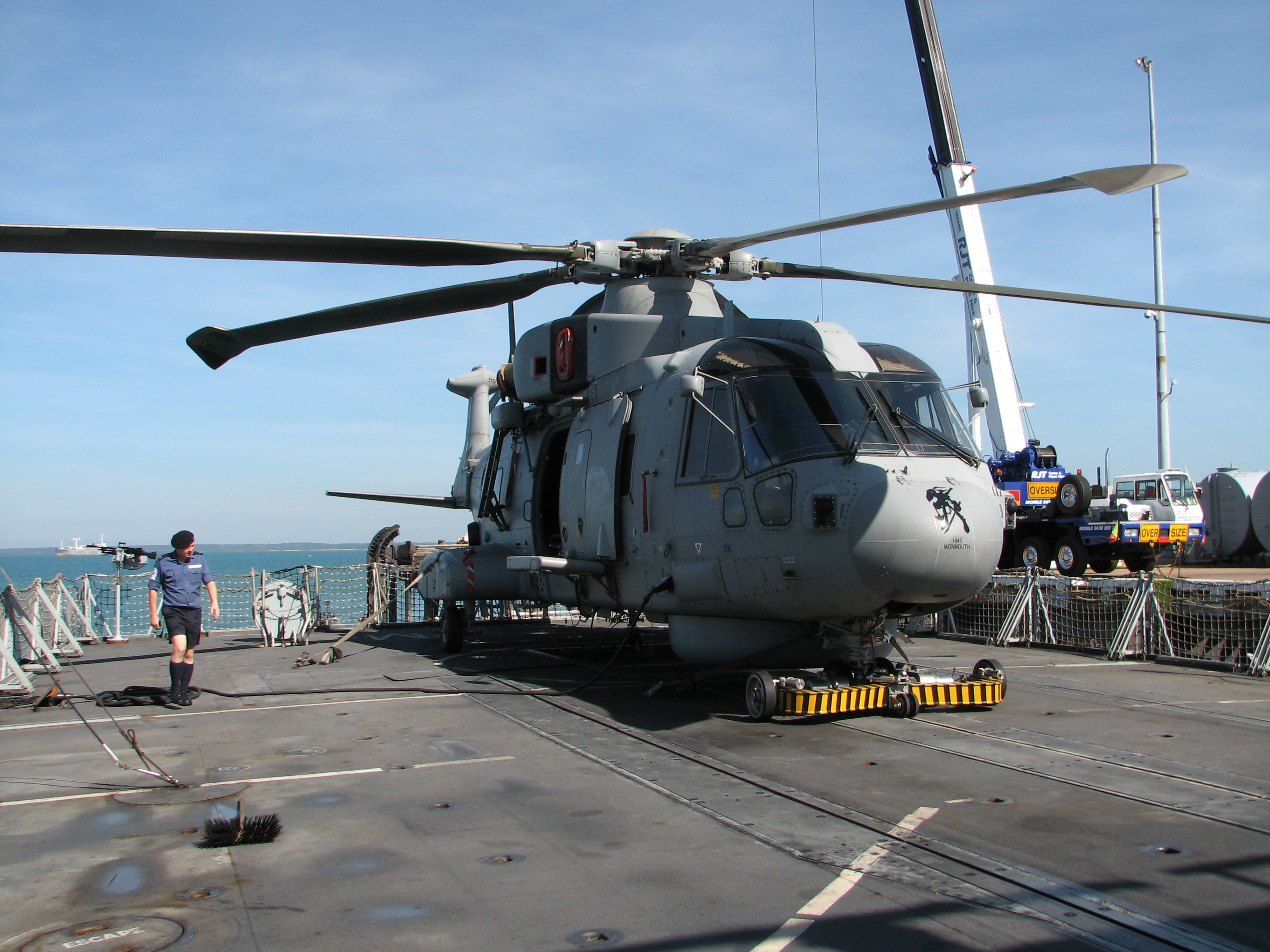
AgustaWestland Merlin HM1 on HMS Monmouth's flight deck

== Affiliations ==
- 1st The Queen's Dragoon Guards
- Royal Monmouthshire Royal Engineers
- No. 70 Squadron RAF
- No. 19 Squadron RAF
- Monmouth (town)
- Worshipful Company of Drapers
