= Seagnat =

British decoy system

The Seagnat Control System (sometimes spelled SeaGnat or Sea Gnat) is a British decoy system produced by System Engineering & Assessment (SEA) Ltd firing rounds produced by Chemring Countermeasures Ltd used on many NATO warships to safeguard against incoming missiles.

It started development in 1973 as a collaborative NATO project involving the United States, Britain, Germany, Norway and Denmark. The system is compatible with a modified Mark 36 SRBOC launching system which means it could be used by any ship with the SBROC, though the Seagnat rounds are not directly interchangeable. It was selected for use on the British Type 23 frigate in 1985 and limited production started in 1986. It went into service in 1987 aboard HMS Argus.

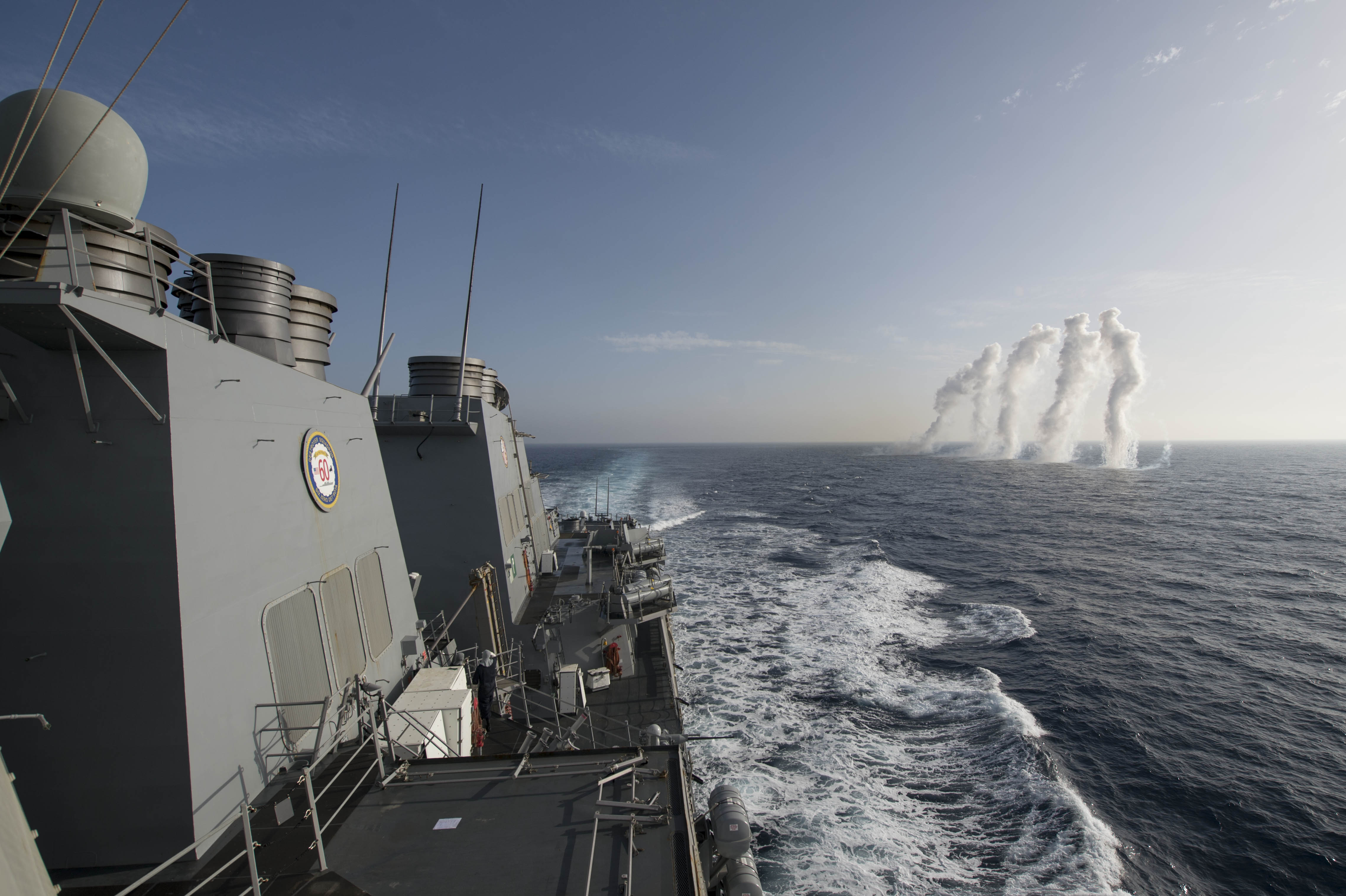
Mk245 infrared round deployed from USS Carney in the Mediterranean Sea.

Each unit consists of six launchers that can be loaded with different rounds, depending on the threat:

- Mk214 Seduction Chaff, which was designed to give a larger and more rapid cloud of chaff than existing SRBOC munitions at the time.
- Mk216 Distraction Chaff
- Mk245 "GIANT" IR Round
- Mk251 "siren" Active Decoy Round (only on later "DLH" versions)

The rounds are launched as decoys to trick incoming missiles into missing the ship or to prematurely detonating.

Rounds are launched from NATO modified 130mm Mark 36 SRBOC launchers, either fixed or trainable, and typically mounted in groups of around six barrels.

The Active Decoy Round has three phases: a low g rocket motor to project it away from the ship, a drogue to slow the round, and a parasail wing that allows the decoy to slowly maneuver as it descends to the water. The device is 125 mm (4.9 in) diameter by 1 m (3 ft 3 in) long. It is powered by a thermal battery and its on-board computer allows the transmitters to radiate in either deception mode or noise (smart or barrage). Range is up to 500 m (1,600 ft) from the ship.

== Operators ==
As of 2000 users included:

- Australia
- Denmark
- Germany
- Greece
- Norway
- The Netherlands
- Portugal
- Spain
- United Kingdom
- United States
