= HMS Illustrious (R06) =

1982 Invincible-class light aircraft carrier

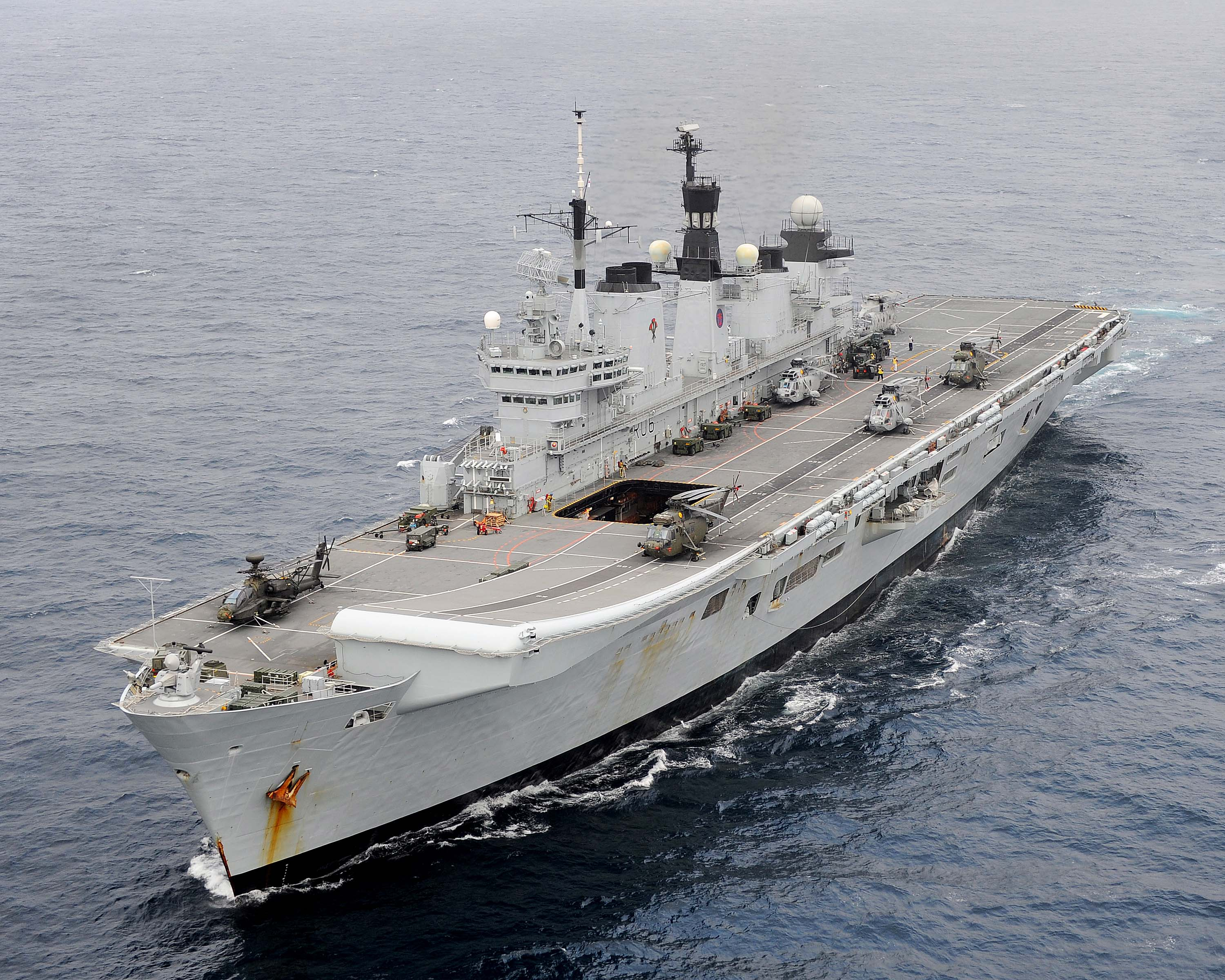
- HMS Illustrious in 2012

History

United Kingdom
- Name: HMS Illustrious
- Ordered: 14 May 1976
- Builder: Swan Hunter, Tyne and Wear, United Kingdom
- Laid down: 7 October 1976
- Launched: 1 December 1978
- Sponsored by: Princess Margaret, Countess of Snowdon
- Commissioned: 20 June 1982
- Decommissioned: 28 August 2014
- Refit: First Major 1990s, Second Major 2003–2005, Third Major 2010–2012
- Home port: HMNB Portsmouth
- Identification: IMO number: 8949563; MMSI number: 229253152; Pennant number: R06; Deck code: L; International callsign: GVUH
- Motto: Vox Non Incerta; ("No Uncertain Sound")
- Nickname(s): "Lusty"
- Fate: Scrapped 2016
- Badge

General characteristics
- Class & type: Invincible-class aircraft carrier
- Displacement: 22,000 tonnes
- Length: 210 m (690 ft)
- Beam: 118 ft (36 m)
- Draught: 25 ft (7.6 m)
- Propulsion: 4 × Rolls-Royce Olympus TM3B gas turbines providing 97,000 hp (75 MW); 8 Paxman Valenta diesel generators
- Speed: 28 kn (52 km/h; 32 mph), 18 kn (33 km/h; 21 mph) cruising
- Range: 5,000 nmi (9,300 km; 5,800 mi) at 18 kn (33 km/h; 21 mph)
- Complement: 685 crew; 366 Fleet Air Arm
- Armament: 3 × Goalkeeper CIWS; 2 × GAM-B01 20 mm close-range guns
- Aircraft carried: Up to 22 helicopters with the combination of: Chinook; Apache; Merlin; Lynx; Sea King; Sea Harriers/ Harrier II

HMS Illustrious was a light aircraft carrier of the Royal Navy and the second of three Invincible-class ships constructed in the late 1970s and early 1980s. She was the fifth warship and second aircraft carrier to bear the name Illustrious, and was affectionately known to her crew as "Lusty". In 1982, the conflict in the Falklands necessitated that Illustrious be completed and rushed south to join her sister ship HMS Invincible and the veteran carrier HMS Hermes. To this end, she was brought forward by three months for completion at Swan Hunter Shipyard, then commissioned on 20 June 1982 at sea en route to Portsmouth Dockyard to take on board extra stores and crew. She arrived in the Falklands to relieve Invincible on 28 August 1982 in a steam past. Returning to the United Kingdom, she was not formally commissioned into the fleet until 20 March 1983. After her South Atlantic deployment, she was deployed on Operation Southern Watch in Iraq, then Operation Deny Flight in Bosnia during the 1990s and Operation Palliser in Sierra Leone in 2000. An extensive re-fit during 2002 prevented her from involvement in the 2003 Iraq War, but she was returned to service in time to assist British citizens trapped by the 2006 Lebanon War.

Following the retirement of her fixed-wing British Aerospace Harrier II aircraft in 2010, Illustrious operated as one of two Royal Navy helicopter carriers. After 32 years' service, the oldest ship in the Royal Navy's active fleet was formally decommissioned on 28 August 2014 even though she would not be replaced until HMS Queen Elizabeth's commissioning in 2017. Despite the UK Ministry of Defence's announcement in 2012 that, once decommissioned, Illustrious would be preserved for the nation, in 2016 she was sold and towed to Turkish company Leyal for scrapping.

== Construction and commissioning ==
Illustrious, the second of the three Invincible-class aircraft carriers, was laid down at Swan Hunter on the River Tyne on 7 October 1976 and launched by Princess Margaret on 1 December 1978. As the ship neared the end of its fitting out period, the Falklands War broke out. As a consequence, work on Illustrious was greatly sped up. The war was won before Illustrious could be finished, but she did perform a useful service in the aftermath. Until the RAF airfield on the Falkland Islands was repaired, air defence of the area was the responsibility of the Fleet Air Arm. After Hermes returned to the UK, Invincible remained on station in the South Atlantic until September 1982. To relieve Invincible, the newly completed Illustrious was rapidly deployed, with 809 Naval Air Squadron (Sea Harrier) and 814 Naval Air Squadron (Sea King) embarked. Additionally, a pair of Sea Kings from 824 Naval Air Squadron were attached to the air group, which had been converted to operate in the AEW role. So rapidly was Illustrious deployed that she was commissioned while at sea. Rear Admiral Derek Reffell, Flag Officer, Third Flotilla, commanded the relief task group from Illustrious during this period. After the RAF airfield was repaired, Illustrious returned to the UK for a full shakedown cruise and workup period, and was formally commissioned on 20 March 1983.

== Operational history ==
=== 1983–1990 ===
The carrier saw no further action during the remainder of the 1980s, but continued to be a valuable asset for the Royal Navy in showing the flag and participating in exercises all around the world. During those years, the ship received several enhancements during refits, including a steeper ski-jump to enable the Harriers in the air wing to take-off with a larger payload. During an 'Extended Dockyard Assisted Maintenance Period (EDAMP)', numerous modifications were made to the ship including the removal of her Sea Dart missile defences at a cost of twelve million pounds. This allowed for extra deck space that enables her to carry up to 22 aircraft, including the Harrier GR7.

On 3 April 1986 she suffered a catastrophic gearbox failure which almost saw the end of the vessel's naval career. Just starting out on her "fly the flag" around the globe trip, at about 00:30 whilst reaching full engine revs, due to conflicting gearbox tolerances causing friction and heat it ignited the oil vapour within the gearbox which exploded causing a fire lasting well over four hours. Sea Harriers were flown off whilst firefighting continued below decks, and one Sea King took the only casualty ashore (smoke inhalation) Although it was a serious fire it was contained within the forward gearbox room and vertical trunking. Additional vessels including the destroyer HMS Nottingham and Ferry Sea Leopard were in attendance, however Illustrious crew managed to extinguish the fire and she returned to Portsmouth under her own power provided by her aft engine room. Although the ship went to emergency stations at no time was any abandonment considered. There was no loss of life or serious injury, but the trip was put off for several months whilst the ship was taken out of service for extensive repairs. In due course once repairs were completed Illustrious sailed directly to the Far East arriving at Singapore to resume the Eastern end of the Global 86 deployment.

=== 1990–2002 ===
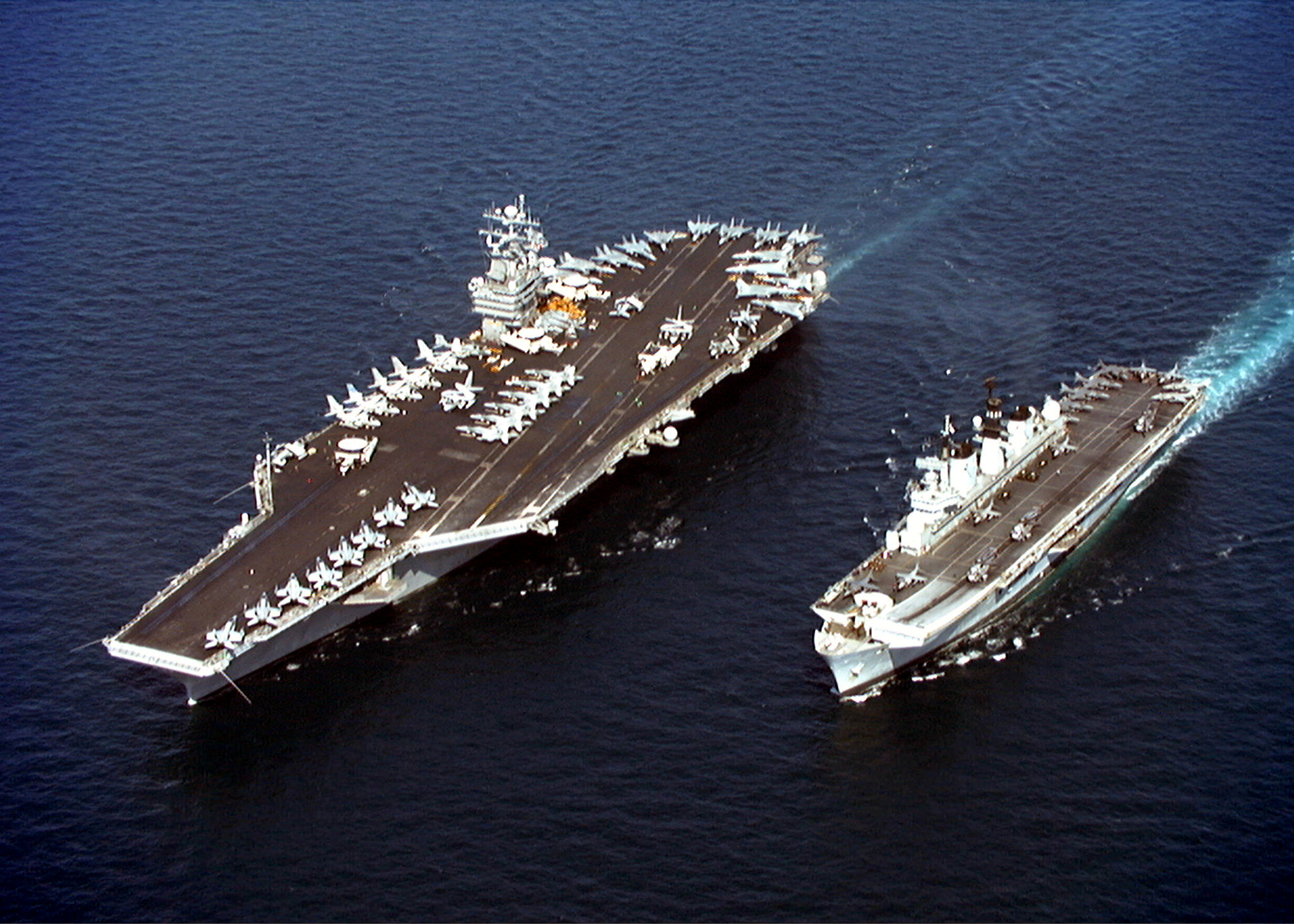
Illustrious (r) and the American USS John C. Stennis in the Persian Gulf in 1998

During the 1990s, the main task of the aircraft carriers of the Royal Navy was helping to maintain the no-fly zone over Bosnia during the war there. All three of the navy's carriers rotated through the area. In 1998 she operated in the Persian Gulf in support of Operation Southern Watch, the Anglo-Saudi-American enforcement of the no-fly-zone over Southern Iraq.

In 2000 Illustrious led Task Group 342.1, a naval task force comprising HM ships — Ocean, Argyll, Iron Duke, Chatham — and numerous Royal Fleet Auxiliary ships in Operation Palliser, which was aimed at restoring peace and stability to Sierra Leone. Commodore Niall Kilgour, Commander Amphibious Task Group, served as the seagoing commander for the operation.

A combat deployment for the ship took place in 2001. A large British exercise, Saif Sareea II took place in Oman in late 2001. During the exercise, the terrorist attacks on the World Trade Center took place. Illustrious remained in theatre while other elements of the task force returned to the United Kingdom. Illustrious had elements of the Royal Marines on board, ready for possible combat operations in Afghanistan. No deployment was made before Illustrious was relieved by Ocean in early 2002 and returned to Portsmouth after seven months at sea.

=== 2003–2005 ===
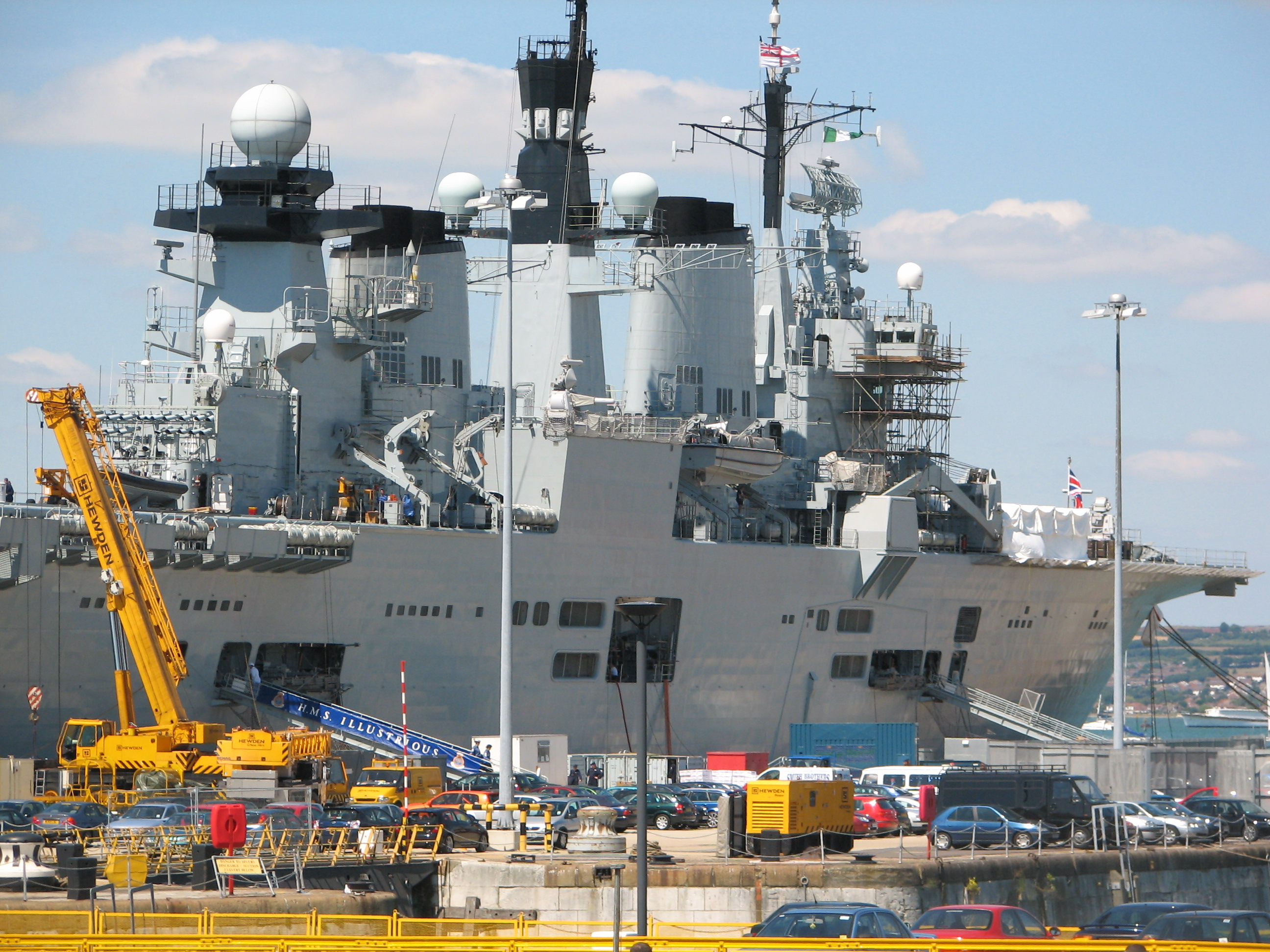
Illustrious undergoing maintenance at Portsmouth during 2005

In mid-2003, the ship underwent a further refit at Rosyth Dockyard. This refit involved the total rebuild of the ski jump, the adding of better communications and reconfiguring the ship so that it can be more quickly switched between the light aircraft carrier and helicopter carrier roles. The refit should have enable her to carry on until 2014, when it was expected that the first of the Queen Elizabeth-class aircraft carriers would come into service. Illustrious returned to Portsmouth following the completion of the refit in December 2004.

She was re-dedicated in 2005, and following the death of the ship's original sponsor Princess Margaret, her daughter Lady Sarah Chatto agreed to attend in a new role as "ship's friend".

=== 2006 ===
Illustrious along with HMS Gloucester helped in the evacuation of British citizens from Beirut as a result of the 2006 Israel-Lebanon crisis. Later that year, as part of the Royal Navy's Remembrance Day activities, Illustrious sailed up the River Thames on Friday 10 November 2006. She was moored at Wood Wharf, a few hundred yards upriver from the Royal Naval College, Greenwich, London, until Wednesday 15 November. Whilst there, the Falklands War commemorative events in 2007 were announced on board her.

=== 2007 ===
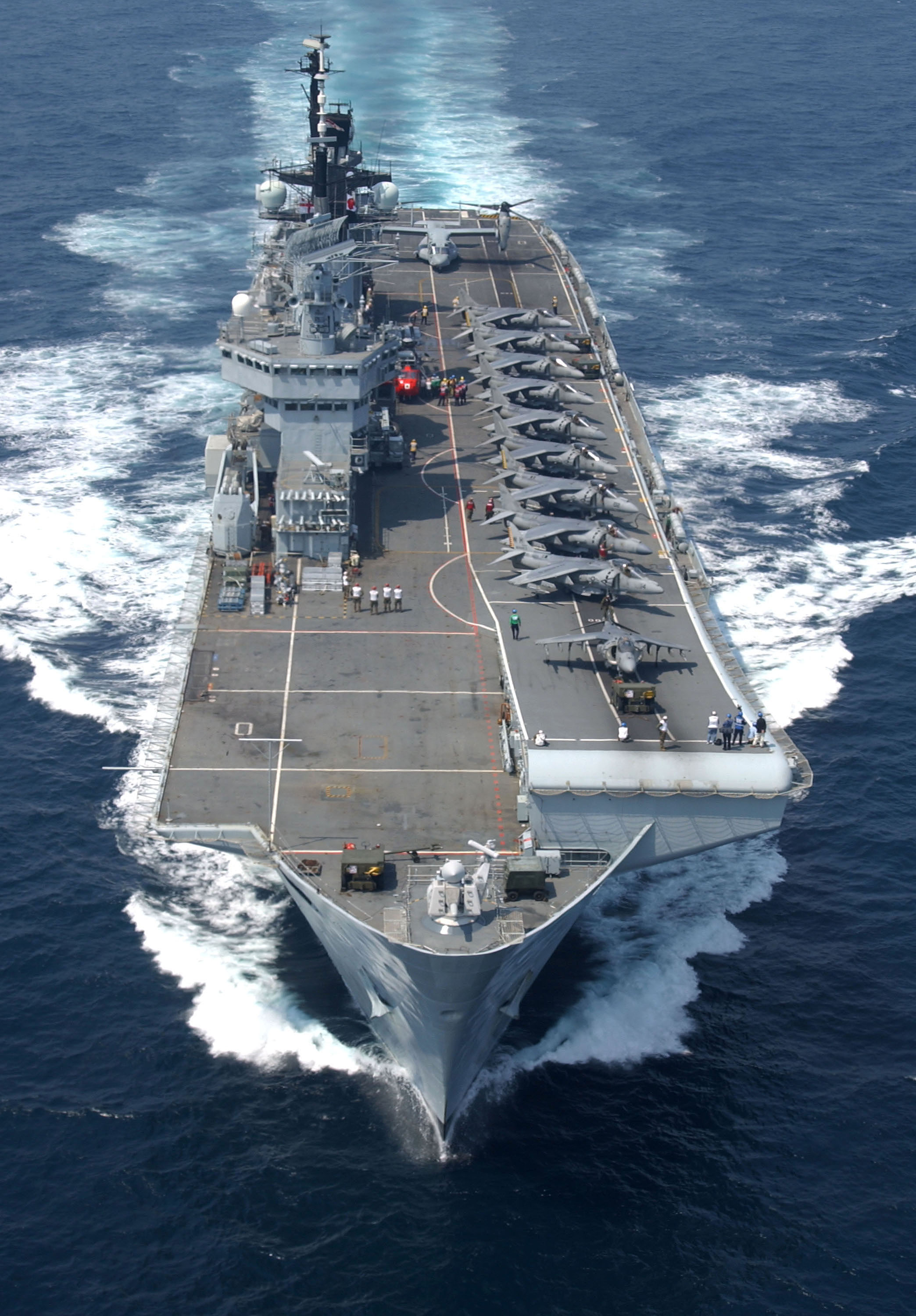
Fixed wing aircraft from the USMC arranged on Illustrious; ten AV-8B Harriers are lined up with, at the rear, an MV-22 Osprey

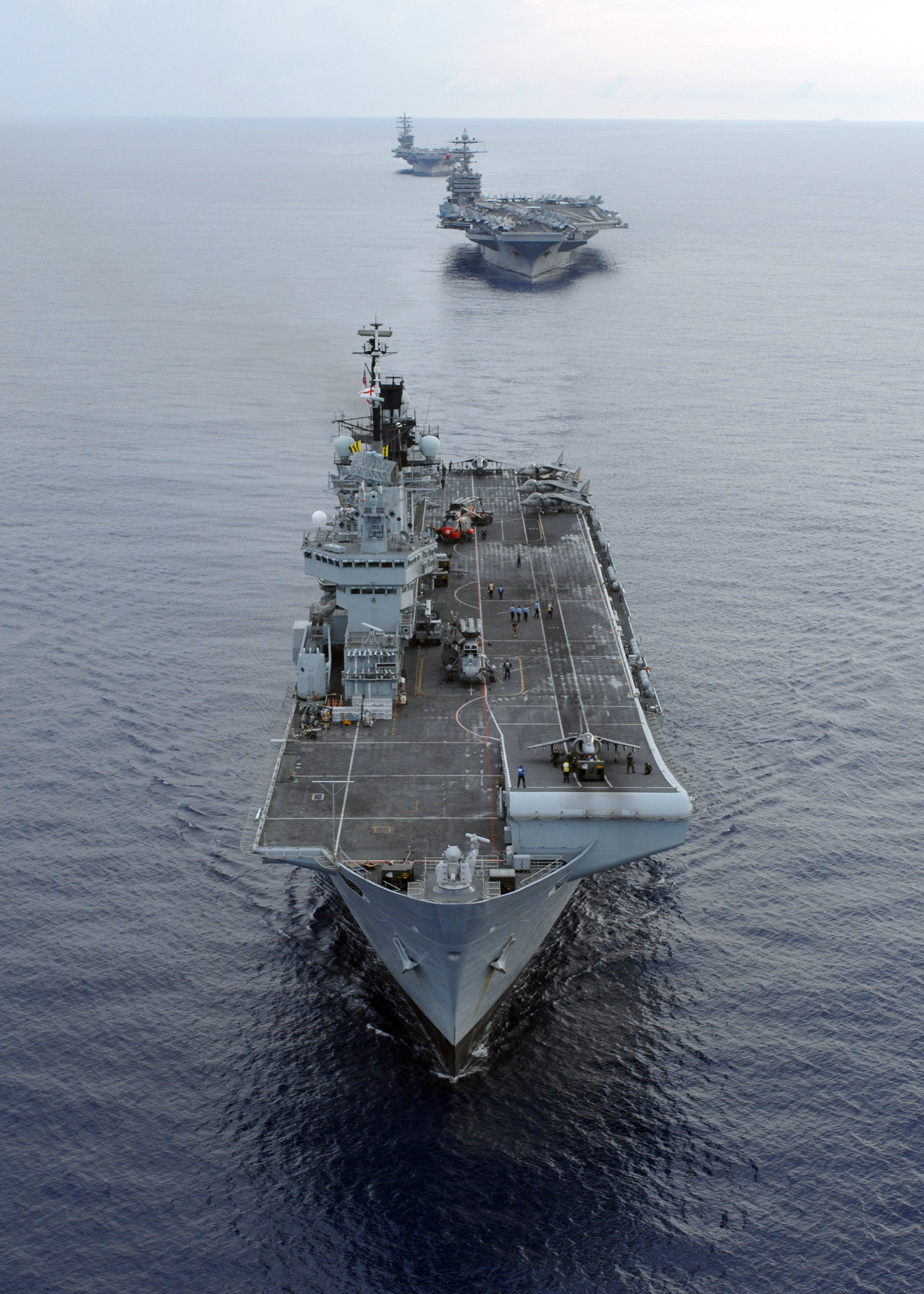
Illustrious in formation with United States Navy Nimitz-class aircraft carriers USS Harry S. Truman and USS Dwight D. Eisenhower on a Joint Task Force Exercise in the Atlantic Ocean, July 2007

Illustrious carried out two weeks of fixed wing flying serials exercises in the North Sea 20 miles (32 km) off Hartlepool in March 2007, during which seven GR9 Harriers from No. 4 Squadron RAF, Joint Force Harrier touched down on her flight-deck. Also during these exercises, seven of her crew had to be airlifted to hospital in Middlesbrough on 13 March suffering from fume inhalation and throat and eye irritation after an accident with chemicals in cleaning a junior ratings' toilet area. Illustrious sailed on to Portsmouth, where they rejoined her on leaving hospital. From 25 to 30 May 2007, after an exercise in the Baltic Sea, Illustrious was the first British aircraft carrier ever to visit Tallinn, Estonia. The visit provided rest for the ship's crew after the Baltic exercise, acted as a diplomatic visit, and also involved naval and air exercises with the Estonian Defence Forces.

Next, in July 2007, Illustrious took part in a US-led Joint Task Force Exercise (JTFX) off the eastern coast of the United States (for which she hosted 14 US Harrier jets and 200 US Marines) before returning to Portsmouth the following month. On 10 July 2007, during the JTFX, a MV-22 Osprey landed aboard Illustrious, the first time a V-22 had landed on a non-U.S. vessel.

=== 2008 ===
The carrier set sail from Portsmouth on 21 January 2008 flying the flag of Commodore Thomas Cunningham, Commander United Kingdom Carrier Strike Group, head of the multi-national Task Group 328.01. The task group included the escorts HMS Edinburgh, and HMS Westminster, the nuclear powered submarine HMS Trafalgar, and Royal Fleet Auxiliaries RFA Wave Knight, RFA Fort Austin, RFA Diligence and RFA Bayleaf (carrying fuel, ammunition, stores and food). Also working with the group at times were USS Cole (an U.S. Arleigh Burke Destroyer), the Spanish frigate Méndez Núñez (F100 class Aegis Frigate), the French frigate Jean Bart, and the British mine countermeasures vessels HM Ships Chiddingfold and Atherstone.

On 23 January, whilst still off the coast of southern England, she sailed back to Portsmouth for repairs to a minor fault in a meat freezer. It was felt to be important to repair this before sailing to a warmer climate, and Navy spokesman Anton Hanney stated that flying in an emergency plumber whilst she was underway would be more expensive than turning back whilst Illustrious was still in the English Channel. She sailed back out at 1pm on 24 January and made up the lost 24 hours. Her ports of call included Valletta, Malta 26–29 February 2008.

From January to May 2008, under the Operation Orion 08 banner, she carried out exercises and diplomatic visits to twenty ports in the Mediterranean, Africa, the Middle East, and south-east Asia.

This 2008 assignment was filmed and shown on Channel 5 as the six part TV documentary Warship transmitted on Mondays from 19 May 2008. This documentary aimed to show life on board the aging carrier in much the same way that HMS Ark Royal was shown in the 1976 series Sailor. Illustrious was commanded by Captain Steve Chick CBE BSc, who had also commanded HMS Chatham during the 2005 BBC documentary Shipmates.

By the end of July, she had returned to Portsmouth where Illustrious took part in the 2008 navy open-day. On board was a full size model of the F-35 Joint Combat Aircraft which will replace the Harriers then used by the ship. Illustrious was the only aircraft carrier to be part of the event, although the inactive Invincible was also visible to the public.

On 17 October she, along with HMS Cattistock, sailed into Liverpool where she was open to the public on Saturday 18 October. On 4 November she moored at Greenwich, arriving to take central part in the Royal Navy's remembrance week with the F-35 mock-up still on deck.

=== 2009 ===
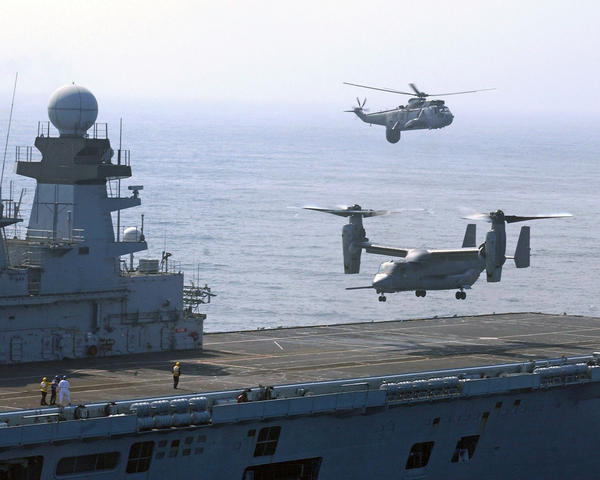
A V-22 Osprey landing on the rear flight deck of Illustrious in the Atlantic Ocean in 2007

On 7 May 2009 she returned to Greenwich to serve as the centre piece of the Royal Navy's celebration of a century of British naval aviation; on board were examples of all the Navy's operational helicopters.

Beginning on 8 June, she took part in the exercise Loyal Arrow in northern Sweden. The exercise lasted until 16 June. On 17 June 2009, she arrived in Tallinn. On 27 June 2009 she was in the harbour of Oslo, Norway.

On 22 October 2009 she arrived at Liverpool for a six-day visit and moored at the cruise terminal. There was a fly past along The River Mersey on 23 October as part of its celebrations to mark that year's centenary of naval aviation. Illustrious was open to members of the public on 25–26 October and departed Liverpool on 27 October 2009.

=== 2010–2016 ===
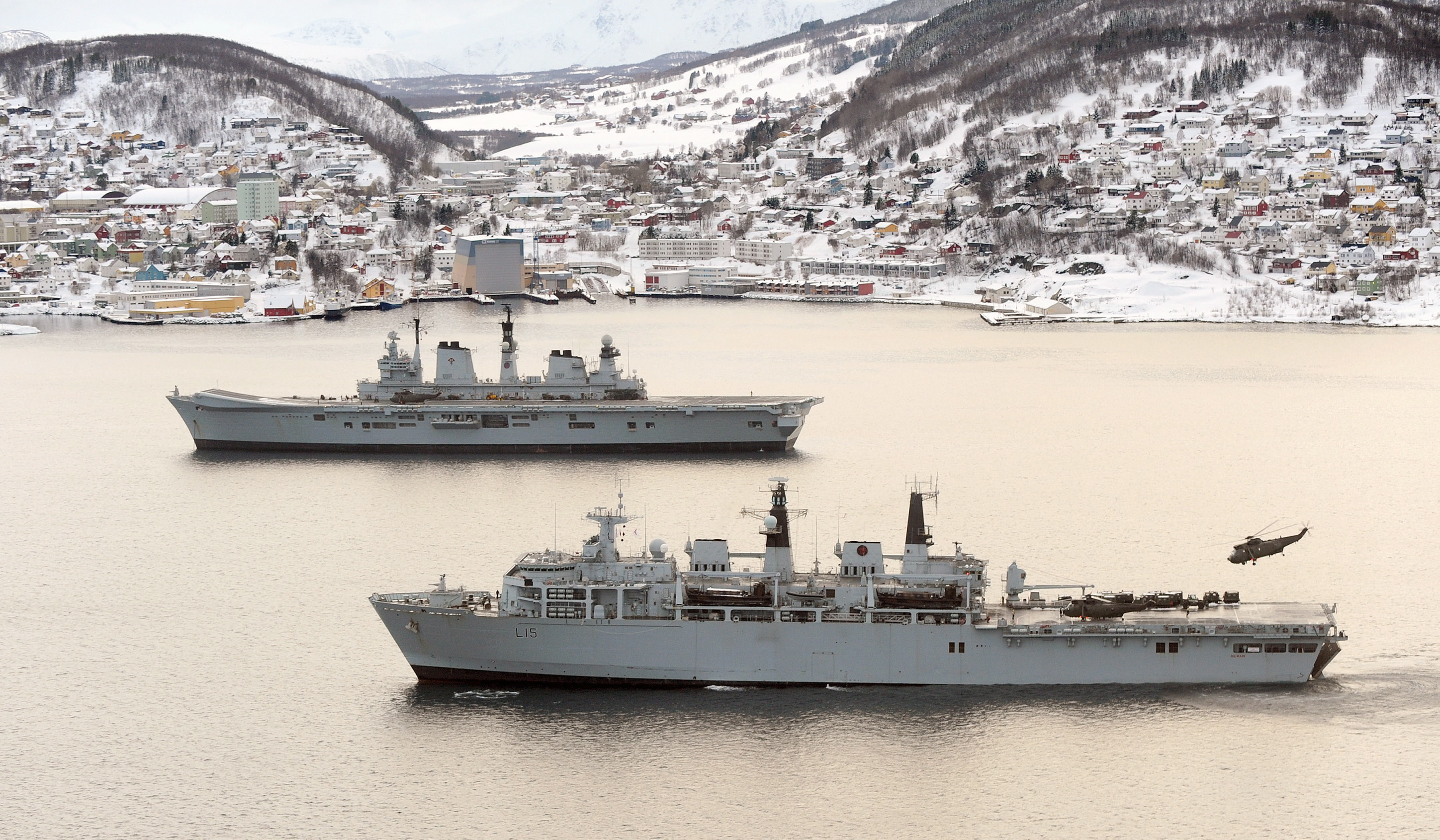
Illustrious (at rear) and HMS Bulwark near Harstad, Norway during Exercise Cold Response in 2012

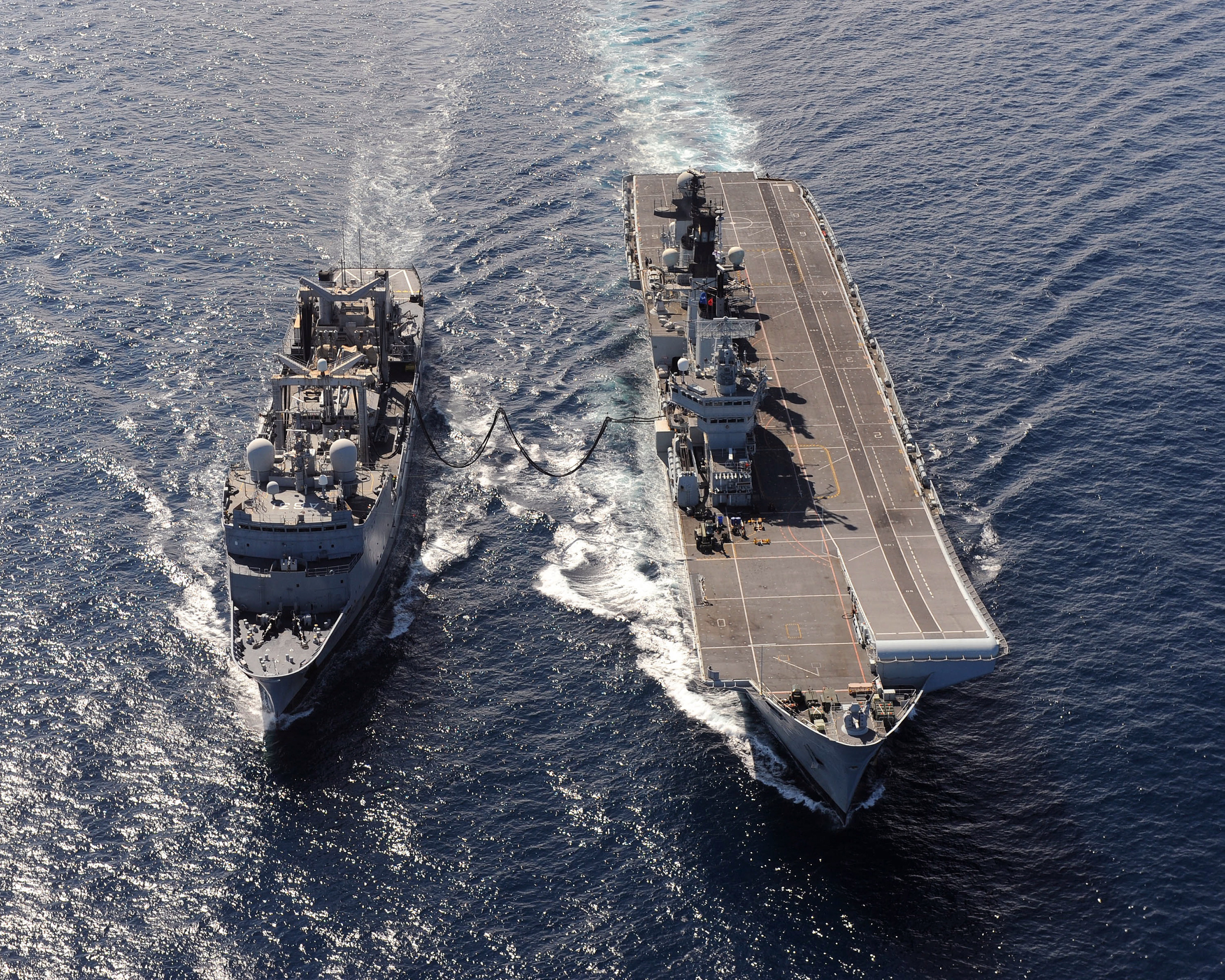
Illustrious takes fuel from the French supply tanker Somme during Exercise COUGAR 13

As part of Strategic Defence and Security Review, and in addition to the retirement of the Harrier force and Illustrious's sister ship Ark Royal, it was announced that a short study would be carried out to determine whether Illustrious or Ocean was the most viable helicopter platform. The decision was subsequently made to retain Ocean for the longer term. In May 2011 Illustrious was made operational after a £40 million refit, and she was handed back to the fleet after sea trials in late July 2011 She took over the helicopter carrier role while Ocean underwent a planned refit, due for completion by 2014; Illustrious was then withdrawn from service. The Ministry of Defence also announced on 12 September 2012 that Illustrious, as the last of the Invincible-class aircraft carriers, would be preserved as a memorial "in recognition of the service given by these ships in protecting the UK over the last 30 years".

In March 2012, Illustrious took part in Exercise 'Cold Response' with Bulwark, RFA Mounts Bay and other Royal Navy vessels. This was a NATO winter war games exercise conducted in northern Norway, where she tested her capabilities as a helicopter carrier. Illustrious was awarded the Bambara Trophy, the trophy is given to a unit each year with the best flight safety record, during 'Cold Response'. Following 'Cold Response' she then took part in Exercise 'Joint Warrior' with vessels from Norway, the Netherlands and the United States and Cougar 12 in the Mediterranean. In May 2013, as part of the 70th Anniversary of The Battle of the Atlantic Commemorations, Illustrious sailed up the River Thames and was moored at Greenwich where she was used as the venue for a charity reception in aid of the Royal Navy's aviation heritage.

She was deployed as part of Exercise COUGAR 13 during the autumn of 2013 along with HMS Bulwark, HMS Westminster, HMS Montrose and six RFA vessels. She was diverted away from the COUGAR 13 task group in December 2013 to assist in Typhoon Haiyan disaster relief efforts in the Philippines and eventually returned to Portsmouth on 10 January 2014.

Illustrious was briefly berthed at Rosyth Dockyard in the first week of July 2014, in a dock adjacent to HMS Queen Elizabeth, which was formally named on 4 July 2014; Illustrious left Rosyth the following day and arrived back at HMNB Portsmouth on 22 July at the end of active service. By then the oldest operational RN warship, she was decommissioned at HMNB Portsmouth on 28 August 2014.

The Royal Navy had hoped to preserve the ship, and in August 2014 it was reported that Kingston upon Hull and two other cities had submitted bids for her. However, these bids were judged to be unviable. On 6 May 2016, the MOD's Disposal Authority advertised the potential sale of Illustrious for recycling only and three months later the sale to a Turkish scrapyard was confirmed.

The former HMS Illustrious left Portsmouth under tow bound for Turkey on 7 December 2016.

== Commanding officers ==
- 1981–1983: Captain Jock Slater RN
- 1983–1984: Captain John Kerr RN
- 1984–1986: Captain Alan Grose RN
- 1986–1988: Captain Peter Woodhead RN
- 1988–1989: Captain Jonathan Tod RN
- 1993–1995: Captain Richard Phillips RN
- 1995–1997: Captain Jonathon Band RN
- 1997–1998: Captain Stephen Meyer RN
- 1998–2000: Captain Mark Stanhope OBE RN
- 2000–2001: Captain Charles Style RN
- 2001–2002: Captain Alan Massey RN
- 2004–2006: Captain Robert Cooling RN
- 2006–2007: Captain Tim Fraser RN
- 2007–2009: Captain Steven Chick RN
- 2009–2010: Captain Benjamin Key RN
- 2011–2012: Captain Jeremy Kyd RN
- 2012–2013: Captain Martin Connell RN
- 2013–2014: Captain Mike Utley RN
- Post Decommissioning: Commander Tim Winter RN

== Affiliations ==
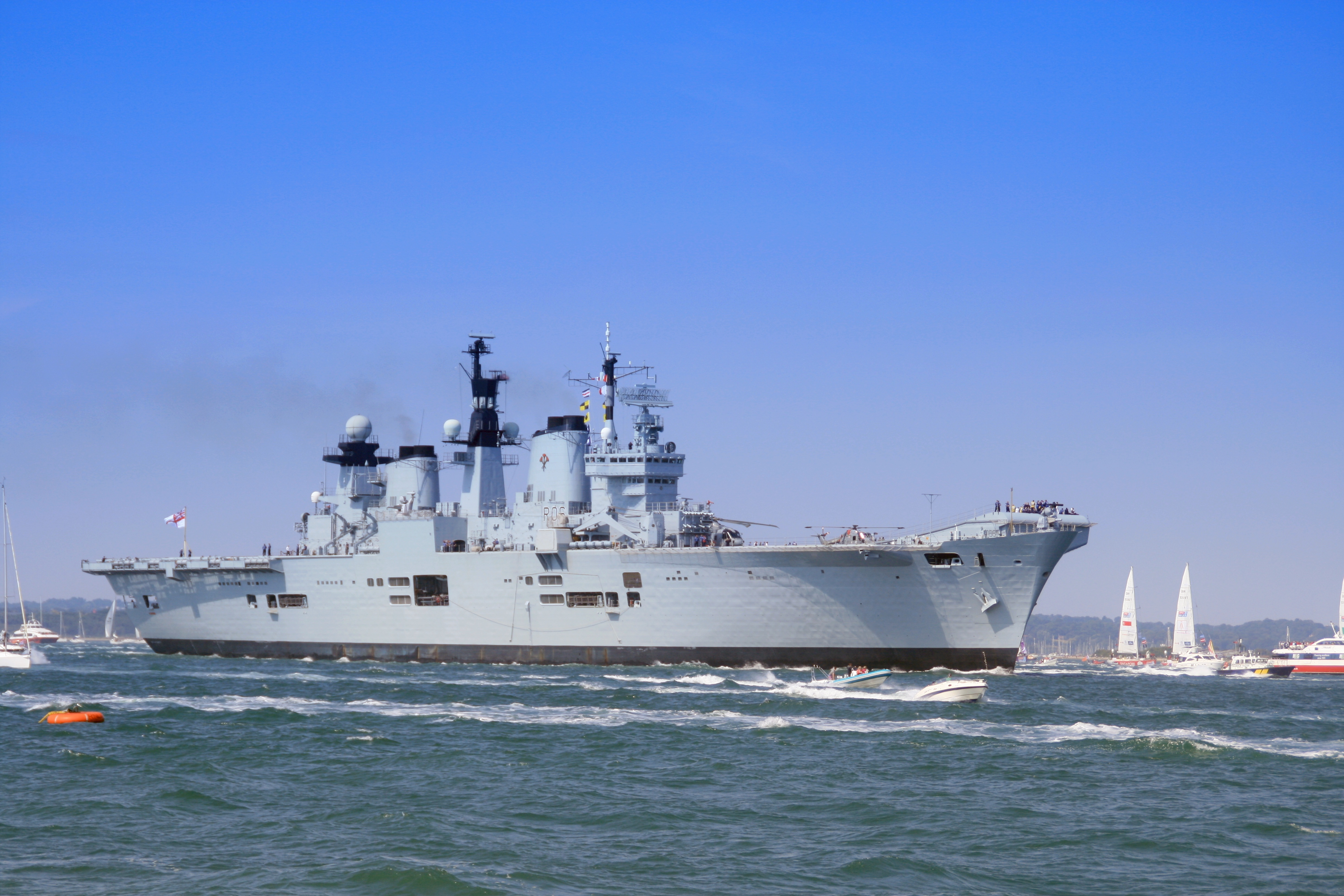
HMS Illustrious escorting the contestants in the 2011 Clipper Round the World Yacht Race to the start line in the Solent.

- Grenadier Guards
- Guild of Air Pilots and Air Navigators
- City of London Corporation
- Worshipful Company of Lightmongers
- 30 Signal Regiment, Royal Signals
- TS Colne Light SCC (Colchester Sea Cadets)
- T.S. Illustrious Sea Cadet Unit
- No. 7 Squadron RAF
- Metropolitan Police Service
- Bath R.F.C.
- Oundle School CCF
- University of London Air Squadron, RAF
- Worshipful Company of Shipwrights
- 4th/6th Leigh on Sea, Sea Scout Group
- HMS Illustrious Association

== In media ==
In 2010, the ship was featured on Channel 5 documentary series Warship. The first series was centred on Illustrious, looking at the daily routines and lives of the crew on board and was filmed during one of her exercises with deployments abroad.

Illustrious was featured in an episode of the television show Real Rooms. She has also featured in the BBC documentary Richard Hammond's Engineering Connections with Richard Hammond.
