= Naval Strike Wing =

Element of the Royal Navy and Joint Force Harrier

- Naval Strike Wing badge
- Founded: 9 March 2007
- Disbanded: 1 April 2010
- Country: United Kingdom
- Branch: Royal Navy
- Type: Wing headquarters
- Role: Harrier operations
- Size: 197 personnel, including 16 pilots
- Part of: Fleet Air Arm; Joint Force Harrier
- Airbase: RAF Cottesmore

Commanders
- Notable commanders: Captain Adrian P. Orchard, OBE, RN

Aircraft flown
- Attack: Harrier GR7/7A; Harrier GR9/9A

The Naval Strike Wing (NSW) was a Fleet Air Arm flying unit of the United Kingdom's Royal Navy (RN). It consisted of elements of both 800 and 801 Naval Air Squadrons, but operated as a single unit. It was last equipped with Harrier GR9 V/STOL strike aircraft, as part of Joint Force Harrier (JFH), at RAF Cottesmore. Its role was close air support and at the time was the only front line fast jet unit for the Royal Navy.

== History ==
The Naval Strike Wing (NSW) was formed on 9 March 2007, following the re-forming of 800 Naval Air Squadron in 2006 and 801 Naval Air Squadron on 9 March 2007. It included elements of both squadrons, amalgamated into a single operational unit for deployment either on land or aboard the Royal Navy's Invincible-class light aircraft carriers. Equipped with the GR.7 and GR.9 variants of the British Aerospace Harrier II, a second-generation vertical/short takeoff and landing (V/STOL) jet aircraft, it was based at RAF Cottesmore. NSW was the Naval component of Joint Force Harrier.

=== Operational deployments ===
The Naval Strike Wing undertook operational deployments to Afghanistan as part of Operation Herrick and also maintained the Royal Navy's Harrier carrier capability through deployments aboard Invincible-class light aircraft carrier HMS Illustrious and other exercises. In October 2007, the Wing deployed to Kandahar Airfield as part of the British force package for Operation Herrick. Operating within Joint Force Harrier, it contributed to the international air component supporting the International Security Assistance Force (ISAF). Its aircraft were principally employed in direct support of British forces in Helmand Province, while the deployment demonstrated the ability of Fleet Air Arm aircraft and personnel to operate from either land or sea. The planned deployment of the Naval Strike Wing to Afghanistan in October 2007 was also confirmed by the Ministry of Defence in Parliament.

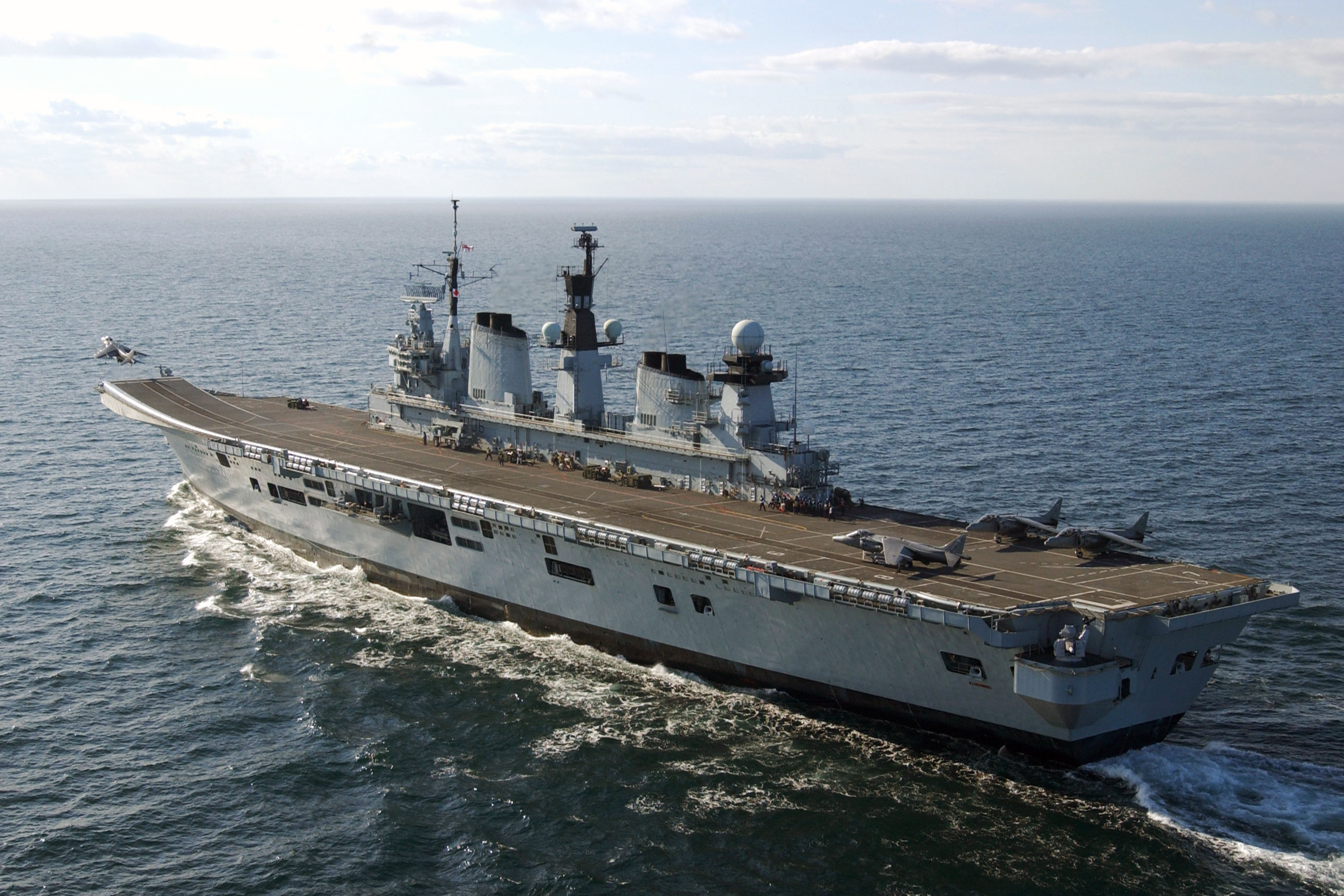
HMS Illustrious with Naval Strike Wing (NSW) Harrier aircraft embarked

In early 2008, the Wing returned to carrier operations. Four of its Harrier GR7 and GR9 aircraft embarked aboard HMS Illustrious in March 2008 for Exercise Orion 08, a multinational maritime task-group deployment to the Indian Ocean. The aircraft conducted training missions including ground-attack exercises and air-defence training in support of the task group.

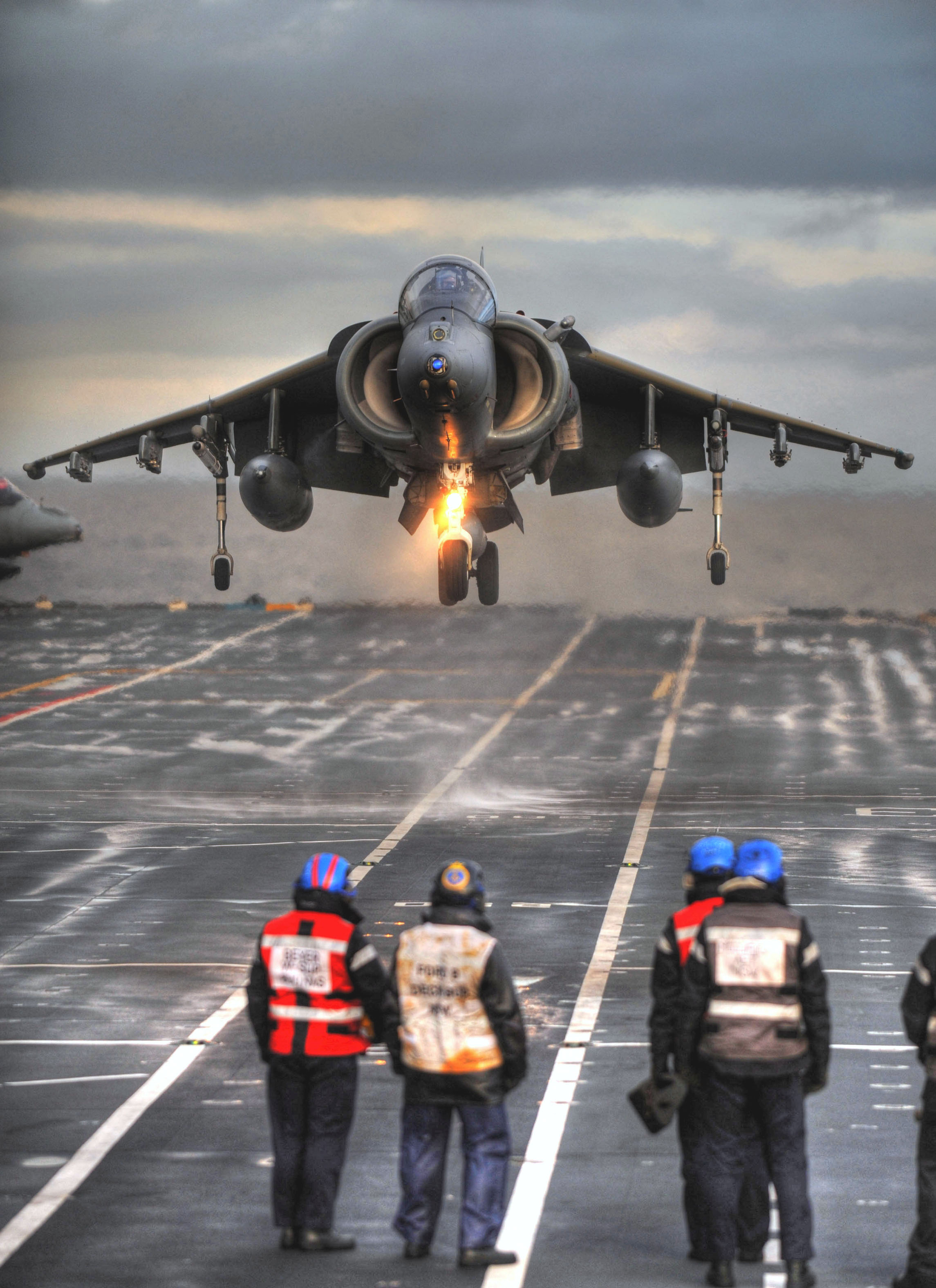
A Harrier GR9 prepares to land onboard HMS Ark Royal

The Naval Strike Wing subsequently returned to Afghanistan. The Ministry of Defence announced that elements of the Wing would deploy in October 2008 alongside 3 Commando Brigade Royal Marines, as part of the British force rotation for Operation Herrick. The Wing operated from Kandahar between August and December 2008, providing air support to British and coalition forces as part of the Joint Force Harrier commitment.

Following its Afghan deployment, the Wing resumed its carrier role and participated in further embarked training and exercises during 2009. Its Harriers operated from HMS Illustrious, including during Exercise Joint Warrior, while the Wing also worked to maintain and regenerate the Royal Navy's night carrier operating capability. The Naval Strike Wing therefore retained a dual operational role during its existence, providing a land-based close-air-support capability in Afghanistan while maintaining the Fleet Air Arm's ability to operate Harriers from Royal Navy aircraft carriers.

On 1 April 2010, the Naval Strike Wing reverted to the identity of 800 Naval Air Squadron, bringing the separate Wing's existence to an end. The Harrier GR9 and GR9A continued in Fleet Air Arm service with 800 Naval Air Squadron until the withdrawal of the Harrier force in 2010.

== Force Commanders ==
List of commanding officers of Naval Strike Wing (NSW):

- Commander A.P. Orchard, RN, from 9 March 2007
- Commander K.W. Seymour, RN, from 6 June 2007
- Commander D.J. Lindsay, RN, from 29 April 2009
- became 800 Naval Air Squadron - 1 April 2010

== See also ==
- List of aircraft units of the Royal Navy
