= Loyal Arrow =

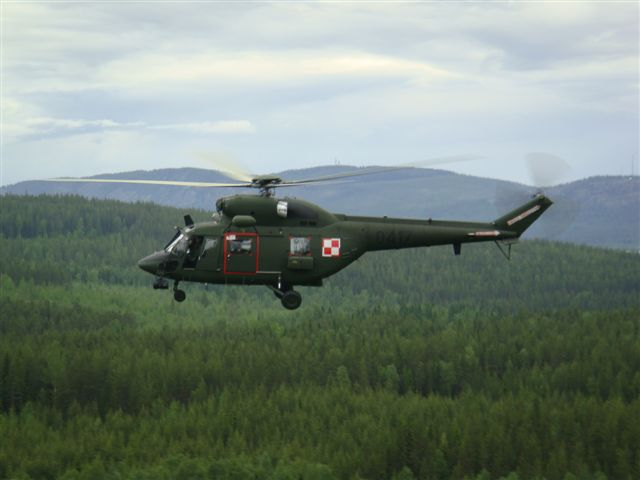
A Polish military helicopter during the Loyal Arrow exercise

Loyal Arrow (also known as Loyal Arrow 2009, Loyal Arrow 09) was a major exercise of the North Atlantic Treaty Organization (NATO) held in Northern Sweden on 8 June 2009 – 16 June 2009. Ten NATO and non-NATO countries will participate in the live fire exercises, which is aimed to train selected parts of the NATO Response Force Joint Force Air Component Headquarters in the conduct and coordination of air operations.

It was the biggest military air exercise ever held in Sweden.

== Participants ==
Overall the exercise involved about 800–900 participants and 50 jet aircraft from Germany, Finland, the United Kingdom, Italy, Norway, Poland, Portugal, Sweden, Turkey, the United States and NATO's airborne early warning component. Planes from NATO's Airborne Warning and Control System (AWACS), as well as other helicopters and transport aircraft, participated in the exercise. The Royal Navy sent HMS Illustrious, an Invincible-class light aircraft carrier, with 1,000 soldiers on board.

Center for the rehearsal was the F21 base outside Luleå in northern Sweden. The airports at Vidsel, Bodø (Norway) and Oulu (Finland) were also used as bases. Command and control was executed by the Joint Force Air Component headquarters from Ramstein Air Base.

== Scenario ==
Within the fictitious scenario, elements of the NATO Response Force (NRF), acting under a mandate by the United Nations Security Council, will be deployed to a theatre of operations, Lapistan.

Lapistan is a fictitious undemocratic unstable country that is ruled by a military clique which hosts terrorist training camps. The exercise's scenario is centered over a conflict over oil and natural gas with Bothnia, a fictitious neighboring NATO country, with some presence of nearby neutral fictitious countries Nordistan and Suomia, who refer to Norway and Finland, respectively.

== Lapistan name controversy ==
The name "Lapistan" gave rise to some controversy as possibly denigrating to Sami people and Muslims. Some Swedish political analysts also expressed concern that such a name may run contrary to Swedish stance of international neutrality. A spokesperson for the Swedish Sami umbrella organization, Svenska Samernas Riksförbund, compared the choice of name to "Jewistan" or "Niggeristan".
