= Joint Force Harrier =

British military formation

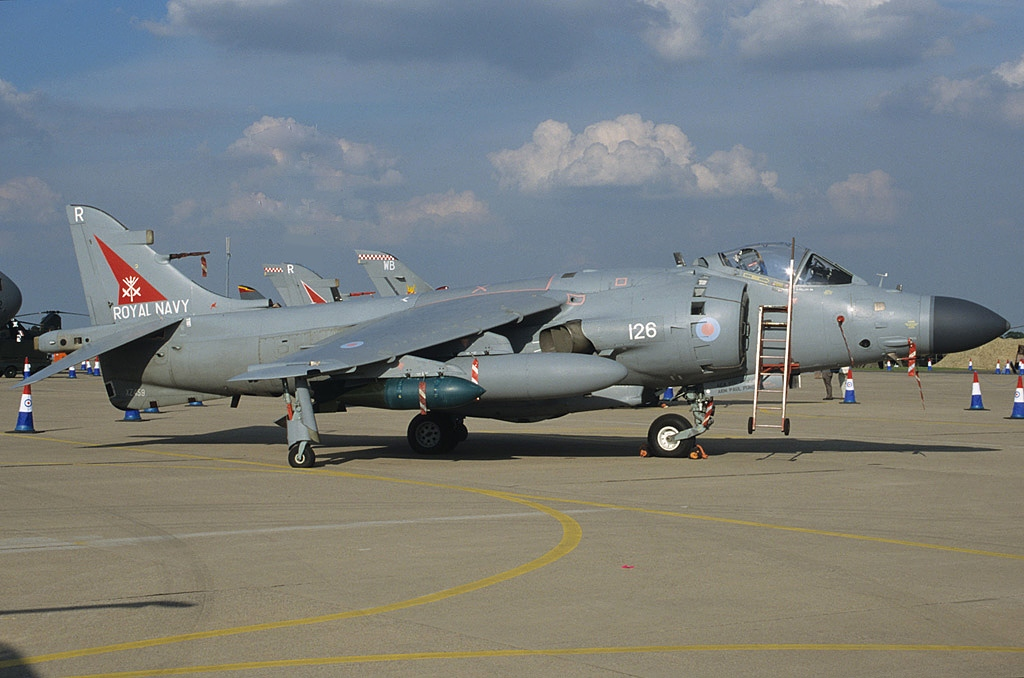
- A Sea Harrier FA2 of 800 Naval Air Squadron, Fleet Air Arm
- Founded: 1 April 2000
- Disbanded: 28 January 2011
- Country: United Kingdom
- Branch: Royal Air Force; Royal Navy
- Type: Joint service force
- Role: Harrier and Sea Harrier operations
- Part of: No. 3 Group RAF (1 April 2000 – 31 March 2006); No. 2 Group RAF (1 April 2006 – 28 January 2011)
- Locations: RAF Cottesmore; RAF Wittering; RNAS Yeovilton
- Engagements: Operation Telic; Operation Herrick

Aircraft flown
- Attack: Harrier GR7/7A; Harrier GR9/9A; Sea Harrier FA2

Joint Force Harrier, initially known as Joint Force 2000 and towards the end of its life as Joint Strike Wing, was the British military formation which controlled the British Aerospace Harrier II and British Aerospace Sea Harrier aircraft of the Royal Air Force and Fleet Air Arm between 2000 and 2011. It was subordinate to RAF Air Command.

Upon its disbandment there were two operational Joint Strike Wing squadrons, one Fleet Air Arm and one Royal Air Force, plus an RAF Operational Conversion Unit.

== History ==
Joint Force Harrier (JFH) was established on 1 April 2000 in response to the proposal brought by the British Government as part of Strategic Defence Review. Originally called Joint Force 2000, it combined the Royal Navy's two Sea Harrier FA2 squadrons with the RAF's four Harrier GR7/7A squadrons under a single command structure within RAF Strike Command. This force was to be deployable from both Invincible-class aircraft carriers, Royal Air Force stations and deployed air bases.

The Royal Navy's contribution to the force was the Sea Harrier previously part of Naval Air Command.

In 2006, No. 3 Squadron RAF converted to the Eurofighter Typhoon. In the same year, the Sea Harrier was retired and 800 Naval Air Squadron re-equipped with former 3 Squadron Harrier GR7 and GR9 aircraft. At the same time, the size of operational squadrons reduced from 12 aircraft to nine. The Naval Air Squadron operated but did not own the aircraft.

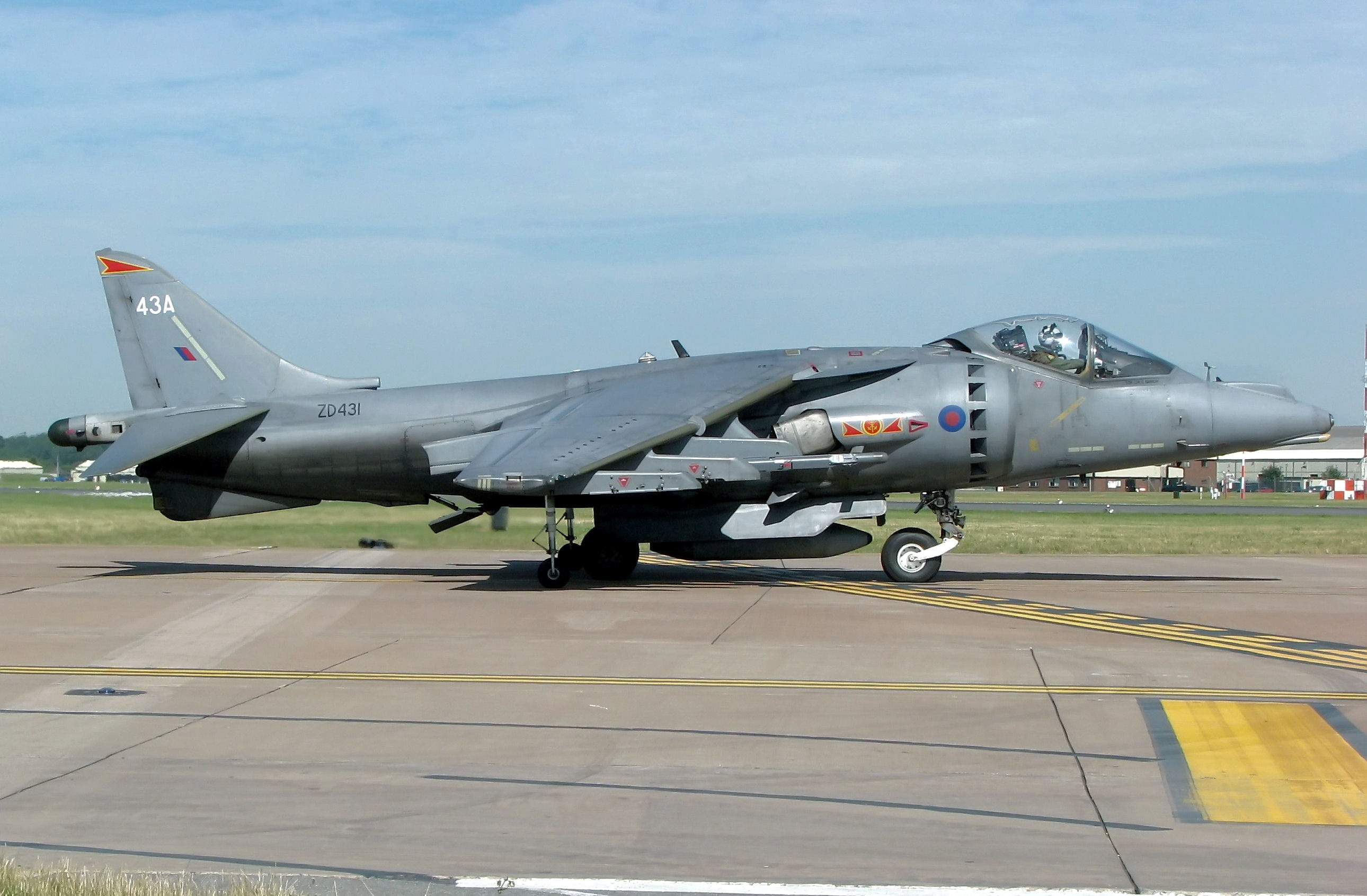
Harrier GR7 of 800 Naval Air Squadron, Fleet Air Arm

801 Naval Air Squadron was also intended to reform with Harrier GR7/9s in 2007. However, on 9 March 2007, the Naval Strike Wing (NSW) was formed. This saw elements of both Fleet Air Arm squadrons amalgamate into a single operational squadron for deployment either on land (such as Afghanistan) or aboard the Royal Navy's two aircraft carriers (HMS Illustrious and HMS Ark Royal). On 1 April 2010, NSW reverted to the identity of 800 Naval Air Squadron.

On 31 March 2010, the force was reduced by one squadron with the disbandment of No. 20 Squadron RAF, the Harrier Operational Conversion Unit (OCU). No. 4 Squadron also disbanded and reformed as No. 4 (Reserve) Squadron at RAF Wittering, taking over as the OCU. At the same time, Joint Force Harrier was renamed Joint Strike Wing and all remaining Harrier GR7 aircraft were retired. Until 2010, it was intended that the Harrier GR9 fleet would continue in service until replaced by 138 STOVL-capable F-35B Lightning II aircraft around 2018. However, on 19 October 2010, as part of the UK government's Strategic Defence and Security Review, it was announced that the Harrier out-of-service date was to be brought forward to April 2011.

HMS Ark Royal, the last of the Invincible-class carriers, launched her final fixed wing aircraft on 24 November 2010 when the four embarked Harrier GR9s left the ship to return to land. On 15 December 2010, a 16 aircraft flypast from RAF Cottesmore marked the final operational flights of British Harriers. 1(F) Squadron, 4(R) Squadron and 800 NAS were disbanded on 28 January 2011.

== Component units ==
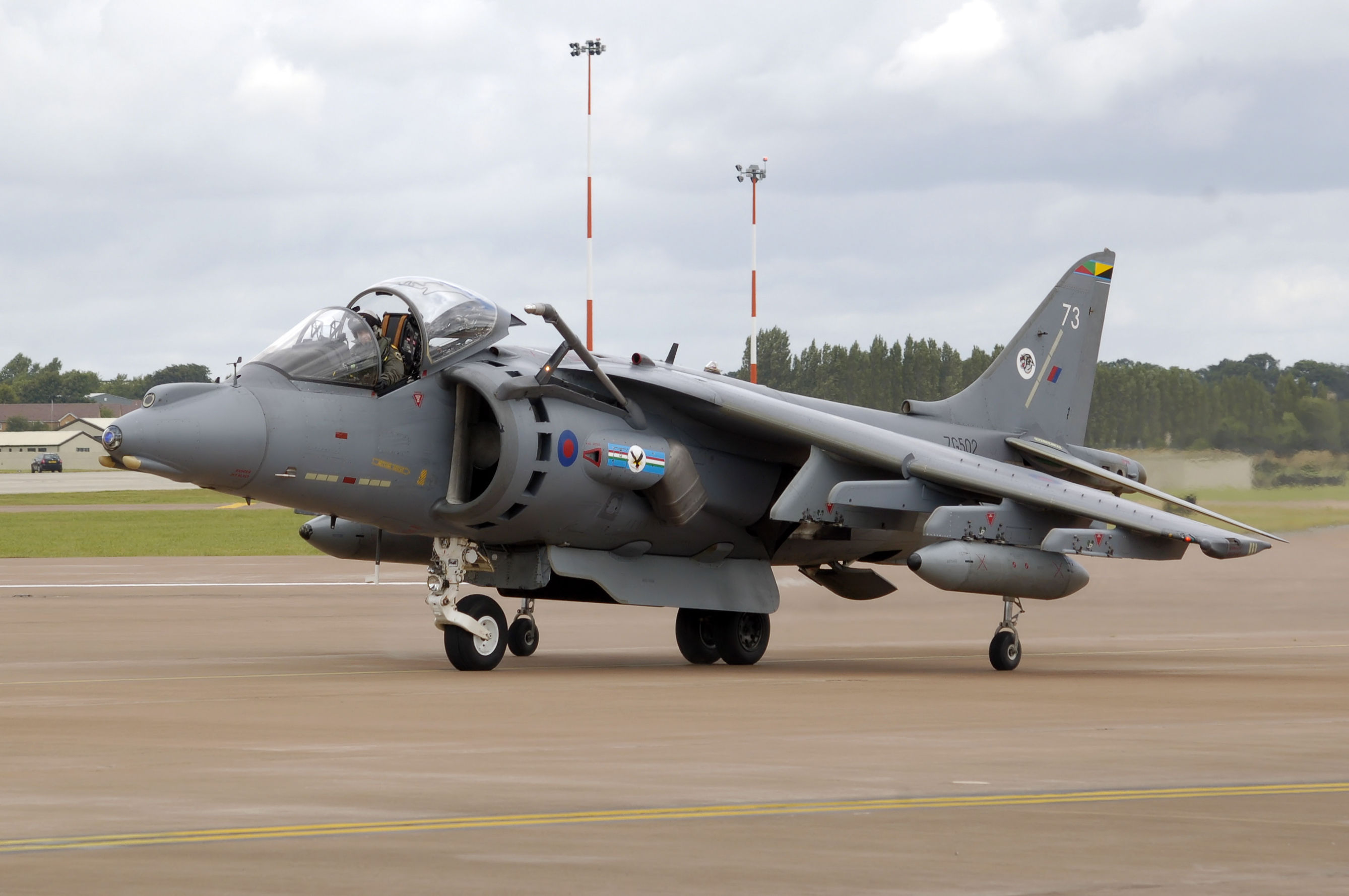
Harrier GR9 of No. 20 Squadron RAF

=== Royal Air Force ===
- No. 1 Squadron RAF (2000–2011)
- No. 3 Squadron RAF (2000–2006)
- No. 4(R) Squadron RAF (2000–2011)
- No. 20(R) Squadron RAF (2000–2010)

=== Fleet Air Arm ===
- 800 Naval Air Squadron (2000–2006 and 2010–2011)
- 801 Naval Air Squadron (2000–2006)
- Naval Strike Wing (2007–2010)
