= RFA Wave Knight =

Two ships of the Royal Fleet Auxiliary have borne the name RFA Wave Knight:

- RFA Wave Knight (A249) was a Wave-class oiler launched in 1945 and scrapped in 1964.
- RFA Wave Knight (A389) is a Wave-class tanker launched in 2000 and in service but in extended readiness, uncrewed reserve, as of 2024.
