= HMS Westminster =

Two ships of the Royal Navy have been named HMS Westminster after the City of Westminster; or the Duke of Westminster:

- HMS Westminster (L40) was a W-class destroyer launched in 1918 and sold in 1947. She was scrapped in 1948.
- HMS Westminster (F237) was a Type 23 frigate launched in 1992 and out of service 2024. She was scrapped in 2026.

== Battle honours ==
Ships named Westminster have earned the following battle honours:

- North Sea 1939–45
- English Channel 1943
