= British Aerospace Harrier II =

Multi-role V/STOL carrier-capable combat aircraft series by British Aerospace

Harrier GR5 / GR7 / GR9
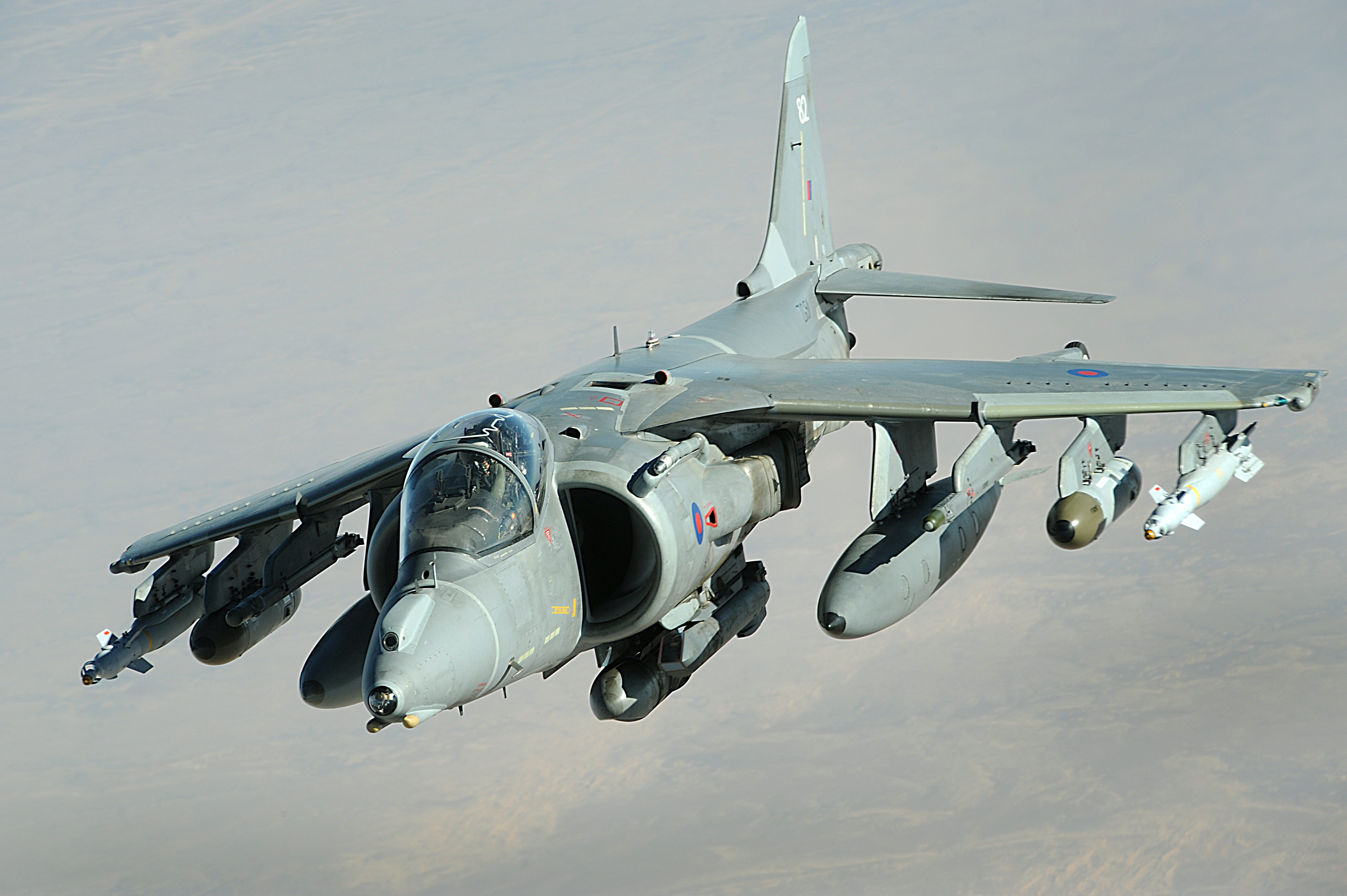
- An RAF Harrier GR9 over Afghanistan, 2008

General information
- Type: V/STOL strike aircraft
- National origin: United Kingdom / United States
- Manufacturer: British Aerospace / McDonnell Douglas; BAE Systems / Boeing
- Status: Retired
- Primary users: Royal Air Force (historical) Royal Navy (historical)
- Number built: 143

History
- Introduction date: December 1989
- First flight: 30 April 1985
- Retired: March 2011
- Developed from: Hawker Siddeley Harrier; McDonnell Douglas AV-8B Harrier II

The British Aerospace Harrier II is a second-generation vertical/short takeoff and landing (V/STOL) jet aircraft used previously by the Royal Air Force (RAF) and, between 2006 and 2010, the Royal Navy (RN). The aircraft was the latest development of the Harrier family, and was derived from the McDonnell Douglas AV-8B Harrier II. Initial deliveries of the Harrier II were designated in service as Harrier GR5; subsequently upgraded airframes were redesignated accordingly as GR7 and GR9.

Under the Joint Force Harrier organisation, both the RAF and RN operated the Harrier II under the RAF's Air Command, including deployments on board the navy's Invincible-class aircraft carriers. The Harrier II participated in numerous conflicts, making significant contributions in combat theatres such as Kosovo, Iraq, and Afghanistan. The type's main function was as a platform for air interdiction and close air support missions; the Harrier II was also used for power projection and reconnaissance duties. The Harrier II served alongside the Sea Harrier in Joint Force Harrier.

In December 2010, budgetary pressures led to the early retirement of all Harrier IIs from service, at which point it was the last of the Harrier derivatives remaining in British service. In March 2011, the decision to retire the Harrier was controversial as there was no immediate fixed-wing replacement in its role or fixed-wing carrier-capable aircraft left in service at the time; in the long term, the Harrier II was replaced by the Lockheed Martin F-35B Lightning II.

== Design and development ==
=== Origins ===
Development of a much more powerful successor to the Harrier began in 1973 as a cooperative effort between McDonnell Douglas (MDD) in the US and Hawker Siddeley (in 1977, its aviation interests were nationalised to form part of British Aerospace) in the UK. First-generation Harriers were being introduced into Royal Air Force and United States Marine Corps; operational experience had highlighted demand for a more capable aircraft. The British government had only a minor requirement, for up to 60 Harriers at most and competing pressures on the defence budget left little room for frivolous expenditure such as the Advanced Harrier. A lack of government backing for developing the necessary engine of the new aircraft, the Pegasus 15, led Hawker to withdraw from this project in 1975.

Due to US interest, work proceeded on the development of a less ambitious successor, a Harrier fitted with a larger wing and making use of composite materials in its construction. Two prototypes were built from existing aircraft and flew in 1978. The US government was content to continue if a major foreign buyer was found and Britain had a plan to improve the Harrier with a new, larger metal wing. (Note: During the late 1970s, Britain had been planning to retrofit the RAF's existing Harrier GR3s to become 'big wing' Harriers, provisionally designated as Harrier GR5 but before the decision was finalised, the alternative option of cooperation in the US program was presented and ultimately opted for.) In 1980, the UK considered if the American program would meet their requirements – their opinion was that it required modification, thus the MDD wing design was altered to incorporate the British-designed leading-edge root extensions. In 1982, the UK opted to become fully involved in the joint US–UK programme. The US and UK agreement to proceed included a British contribution of US$280 million to cover development costs to meet their own requirements and to purchase at least 60 aircraft.

The UK agreement included the involvement of British Aerospace (BAe) as a major subcontractor, manufacturing sections such as the rear fuselage for all customers of the AV-8B. The Harrier II was an Anglicised version of the AV-8B, British Aerospace producing the aircraft as the prime contractor, with McDonnell Douglas serving as a sub-contractor; final assembly work was performed at Dunsfold, England. The first prototype flew in 1981, first BAe-built development GR5 flew for the first time on 30 April 1985 and the aircraft entered service in July 1987. The GR5 had many differences from the USMC AV-8B Harriers, such as avionics fit, armaments and equipment; the wing of the GR5 featured a stainless steel leading edge, giving it different flex characteristics from the AV-8B. In December 1989, the first RAF squadron to be equipped with the Harrier II was declared operational.

=== Description and role ===
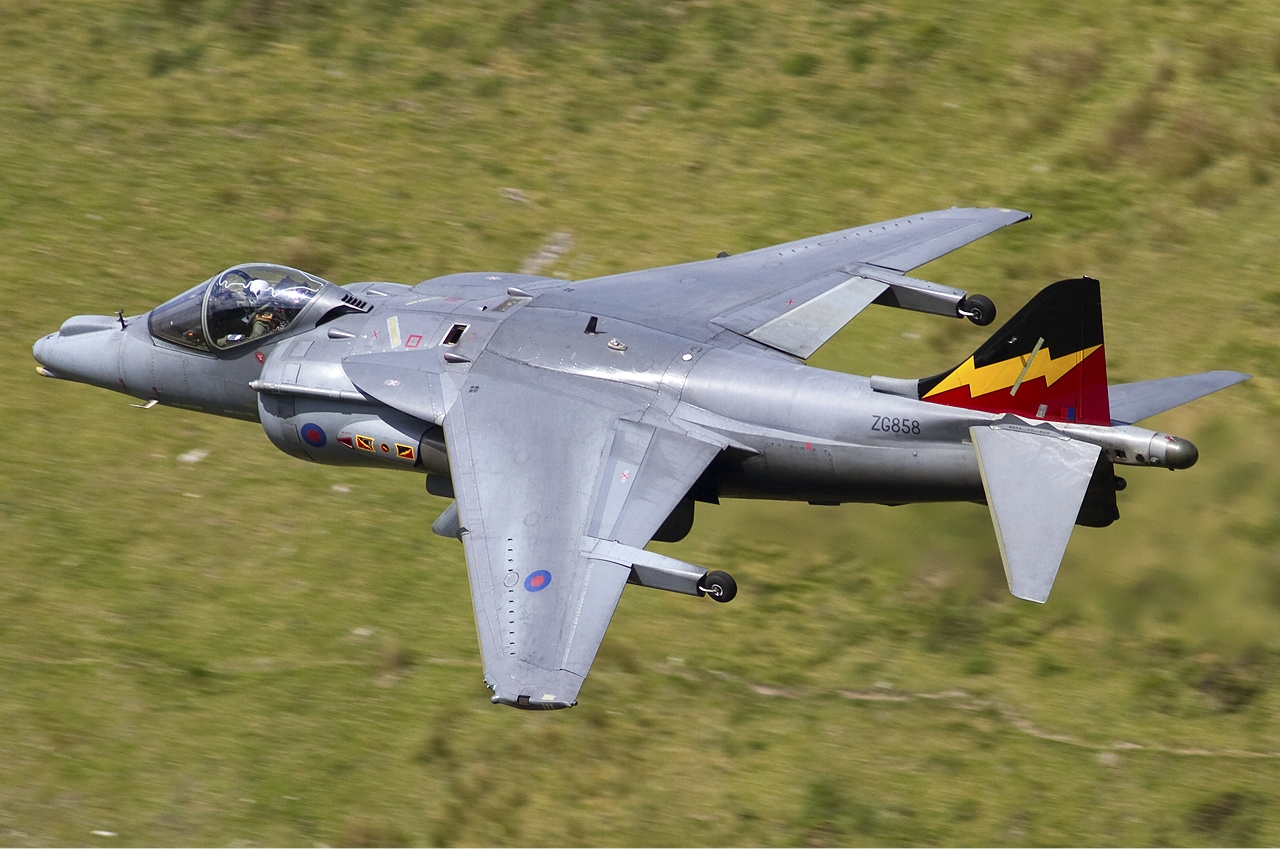
RAF Harrier GR9 in flight, 2010

The Harrier II is an extensively modified version of the first generation Harrier GR1/GR3 series. The original aluminium alloy fuselage was replaced with one made extensively of composites, providing significant weight reduction and increased payload or range. A new one-piece wing provides around 14 per cent more area and increased thickness. The wing and leading-edge root extensions allows for a 6,700-pound (3,035 kg) payload increase over a 1,000 ft (300 m) takeoff compared with the first generation Harriers. The RAF's Harrier IIs feature an additional missile pylon in front of each wing landing gear, as well as strengthened leading edges on the wings in order to meet higher bird strike requirements. Among the major differences with the American cousin, was the new ZEUS Electronic countermeasure (ECM) system, also proposed for the USMC AV-8 (which retained, after an evaluation, the original ALQ-164). ZEUS was one of the main systems in the British design, being a modern and costly apparatus, with an estimated cost of $1.7 million per set.

The Harrier II's cockpit has day and night operability and is equipped with head-up display (HUD), two head-down displays known as multi-purpose colour displays (MPCD), a digital moving map, an inertial navigation system (INS), and a hands-on-throttle-and-stick system (HOTAS). Like the British Aerospace Sea Harrier, the Harrier II used an elevated bubble canopy to provide a significantly improved all-round view. A combination of the new design of the control system and the greater lateral stability of the aircraft made the Harrier II fundamentally easier to fly than the first generation Harrier GR1/GR3 models.

External videos
- Footage of Harrier II HUD during flight
- Harrier GR9 flight demonstration

The RAF used Harriers in the ground attack and reconnaissance roles, so they relied on the short-range AIM-9 Sidewinder missile for air combat. The Sidewinder had proven effective for Royal Navy's Sea Harriers against Argentinian Mirages in the Falklands War; however, from 1993 the Sea Harrier FA2 could also carry the much longer-range AIM-120 AMRAAM, a radar-guided missile. The Sea Harrier had a radar since its introduction and the USMC later equipped their AV-8B Harriers with a radar as part of the AV-8B+ upgrade; however Britain's Harrier IIs never carried a radar. When the Sea Harrier was retired, it was suggested that its Blue Vixen radar could be transferred to the Harrier IIs. However, the Ministry of Defence rejected this as risky and too expensive; the Armed Forces Minister Adam Ingram estimated that the cost would be in excess of £600 million. (Note: The option of equipping several Harrier IIs with the Sea Harrier's Blue Vixen radar was actively studied by Ferranti, however it was found to have involved considerable expense and have required significant development work to successfully integrate the radar; at the same time, the need to provide a dedicated seaborne air superiority capability had not been judged to be a high priority to justify such expenditure.)

=== Further developments ===
Even prior to the Harrier GR5 entering service, it was clear that alterations were required for the aircraft to be more capable in the interdictor role. A more advanced model, designated as the Harrier GR7, was developed primarily to add a night-time operational capability and avionics improvements. (Note: Group Captain Andy Golledge described the Harrier GR7 as being "a truly multi-mission offensive-support aircraft able to conduct air interdiction, close air support, presence, and tactical reconnaissance... importantly, the GR7 can perform any combination of these four mission types during a single sortie".) The GR7 development programme operated in conjunction with a similar USMC initiative upon its AV-8B Harrier fleet. Additional avionics include a nose-mounted forward-looking infrared (FLIR) and night vision goggles, a missile approach warning system (MAW), an electronic countermeasures suite, new cockpit displays and a replacement moving map system. The GR7 conducted its maiden flight in May 1990 and entered service in August 1990. Following the full delivery of 34 Harrier GR7s in 1991, all of the GR5s underwent avionics upgrades to become GR7s as well.

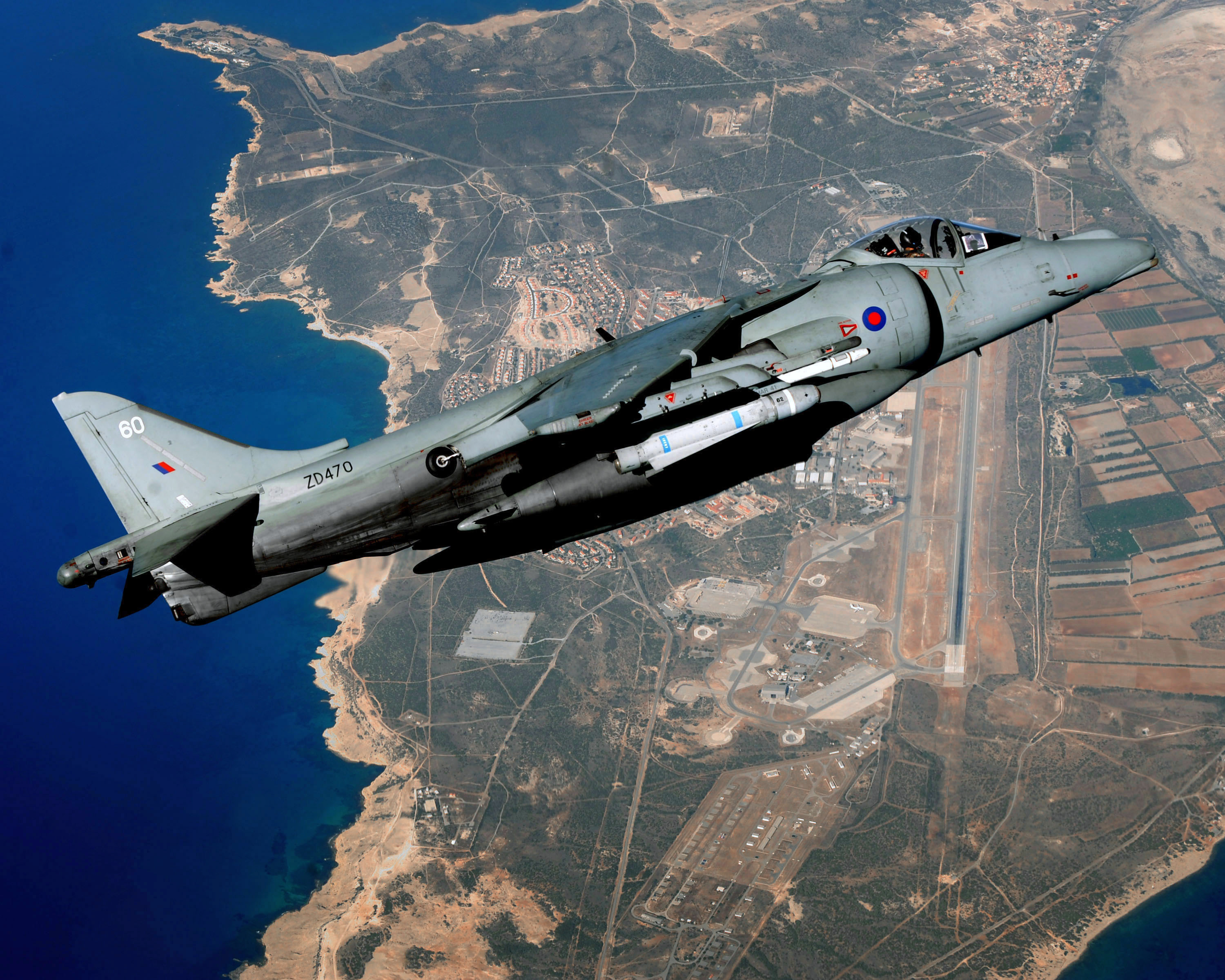
RAF Harrier II flying above RAF Akrotiri, Cyprus, 2010

Some GR7s were equipped with uprated Rolls-Royce Pegasus engines, correspondingly redesignated as GR7A; these Harriers had significantly improved takeoff and landing capabilities, and could carry greater payloads. (Note: The adoption of the uprated Pegasus Mk 107 engine removed several environmental limitations previously imposed upon the Harrier II; in hot environments such as the Persian Gulf the take-off and landing performance could become insufficient for carrier operations.) In order to guide laser-guided bombs, from 1998 onwards a number of TIALD laser designator pods were made available to the Harrier II fleet, however these proved to be extremely scarce and often unavailable for pilot training. In response to difficulties experienced while communicating with NATO aircraft during the 1999 Kosovo War, the GR7s were upgraded with encrypted communications equipment.

A further major upgrade programme from the GR7 standard was conducted; the Harrier GR9. The GR9 was developed via the Joint Update and Maintenance Programme (JUMP), which significantly upgraded the Harrier fleet's avionics, communications systems, and weapons capabilities during scheduled periods of maintenance in an incremental manner. The upgrade also replaced the composite rear fuselage of the GR7 with one made of metal which was less vulnerable to damage from engine vibrations. The first of the incremental improvements started with software upgrades to the communications, ground proximity warning and navigation systems, followed by the integration of the AGM-65 Maverick air-to-ground missile. Capability C added the RAF's Rangeless Airborne Instrumentation Debriefing System (RAIDS), Raytheon's Successor Identification Friend or Foe (SIFF) system and the Paveway guided bombs. The Digital Joint Reconnaissance Pod (DJRP) was added as part of Capability D.

In February 2007, handling trials of the MBDA Brimstone (missile) began, however the Brimstone would remain uncleared for deployment on the GR9 by the type's early retirement. The Sniper targeting pod replaced the less accurate TIALD in 2007, under an Urgent Operational Requirement (UOR) for Afghanistan. (Note: In the Afghan theatre, the TIALD pod's forward looking infrared (FLIR) had proven to have too low a resolution for the urban close air support missions, often being unable to distinguish between enemy and friendly coalition ground troops. The Sniper pod was reportedly capable of identifying weapons caches and even individuals carrying weapons from a safe altitude.) Capability E would have included a Link 16 communications link, an auxiliary communications system, and a Tactical Information Exchange Capability (TIEC) system that was planned to by deployed on both the Harrier II and the Tornado GR4. In July 2007, BAE Systems completed the final of seven Harrier GR9 replacement rear fuselages for the MoD. The fuselage components were designed and built as part of a three-year £20 million programme. In July 2008, Qinetiq was awarded a contract to perform upgrades and maintain the Harrier II fleet until 2018, which was the predicted out of service date for the type.

== Operational history ==
=== Combat duties ===
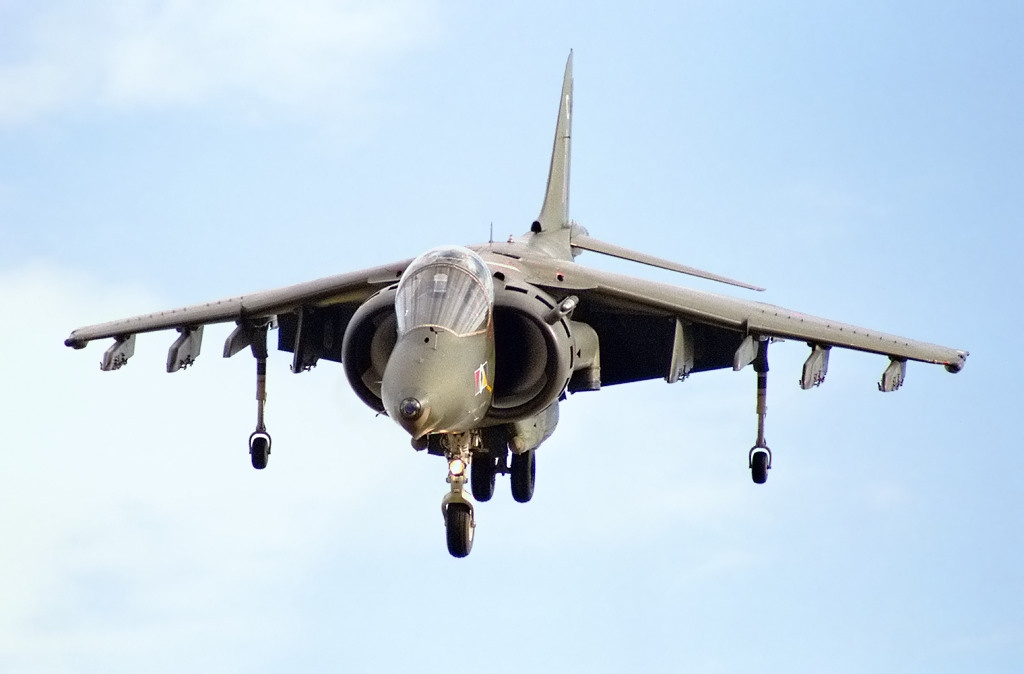
Harrier GR5 during a display at Bournemouth Airport, 1990

The first squadrons to receive the Harrier II were based in Royal Air Force Germany, a standing force maintained to deter Soviet aggression against the West and, in the event of war, to carry out ground attacks. As the Harrier II had significantly greater range and survivability than its predecessor the Hawker Siddeley Harrier, a new emphasis was placed on interdiction operations. By the end of 1990, the Harrier II was approaching full operational status with several squadrons. During the 1991 Gulf War, the Harrier II was considered to be too immature to be deployed. However, several aircraft were dispatched to patrol no-fly zones over Iraq from 1993 onwards. In 1994, the last of the RAF's first generation Harriers was retired, the Harrier II having taken over its duties.

In 1995, hostilities between ethnic Croatians and Serbians in the aftermath of the collapse of Yugoslavia led to the dispatch of NATO forces to the region as a deterrent to further escalations in violence. A squadron of Harrier IIs was stationed at Gioia del Colle Air Base in Italy, relieving an earlier deployment of RAF SEPECAT Jaguars. Both attack and reconnaissance missions were carried out by the Harriers, which had been quickly modified to integrate GPS navigation for operations in the theatre. More than 126 strike sorties were carried out by Harrier IIs, often assisted by Jaguar fighter-bombers acting as designators for laser-guided bombs such as the Paveway II. Bosnia was reportedly the first air campaign in which the majority of ordnance expended was precision-guided.

In June 1994, the newly introduced GR7 was deployed for trials on board the Navy's Invincible-class aircraft carriers. Operational naval deployments began in 1997. (Note: According to Royal Navy Commander Toby Elliott, he had faced considerable internal opposition over the introduction of the Harrier II to the navy's aircraft carriers due to inter-service rivalries.) The capability soon proved useful: in 1998, a deployment was conducted to Iraq via aircraft carriers stationed in the Persian Gulf. In 2000, 'presence' and reconnaissance sorties over Sierra Leone were performed by carrier-based Harrier GR7s and Royal Navy Sea Harrier FA2s. The Invincible-class carriers also received multiple adaptations for greater compatibility with the Harrier II, including changes to the communications, lighting and flight deck.

Cooperative operations between the two services was formalised under the Joint Force Harrier (JFH) command organisation, which was brought about following the 1998 Strategic Defence Review. Under JFH, RAF Harrier IIs would routinely operate alongside the Royal Navy's Sea Harriers. The main JFH operating base was RAF Cottesmore, a great emphasis was placed on inter-service interaction across the organisation. The combined Joint Force Harrier served as the basis for future expeditionary warfare and naval deployments. In the long term, JFH also served as a pilot scheme for the joint operation of the Lockheed Martin F-35 Lightning II.

During Operation Allied Force, the NATO mission over Kosovo in 1999, the RAF contribution included 16 Panavia Tornados and 12 Harrier GR7s. On 27 April 1999, during a mission to attack a Serbian military depot, RAF Harriers came under heavy anti-aircraft fire, but did not suffer losses as a result. In April 1999, the rules of engagement were changed to allow Harriers to use GPS navigation and targeting during medium-altitude bombing missions. A total of 870 Harrier II sorties were carried out during the 78-day bombing campaign. The BBC reported the Harrier II had been achieving 80% direct hit rate during the conflict; a later Parliamentary Select Committee found that 24% of munitions expended in the theatre by all RAF aircraft had been precision weapons.

In 2003, the Harrier GR7 played a prominent role during Operation Telic, the UK contribution to the U.S.-led Iraq War. When war broke out, Harriers flew reconnaissance and strike missions inside Southern Iraq, reportedly to destroy Scud missile launchers to prevent their use against neighbouring Kuwait. Prior to the war, the Harriers had been equipped with a new armament, the AGM-65 Maverick missile, which reportedly was a noticeable contribution to the Harrier's operations over Iraq; a total of 38 Mavericks were launched during the campaign.

During the Battle of Basra, a key Iraqi city, Harriers conducted multiple strike missions against Iraqi fuel depots to cripple enemy ground vehicles; other priority targets for the Harriers included tanks, boats, and artillery. According to Nordeen, roughly 30 per cent of all RAF Harrier operations were close air support missions, supporting advancing allied ground troops. In April 2003, the Ministry of Defence admitted that RAF Harriers had deployed controversial RBL755 cluster bombs in Iraq. Both the British and American Harrier squadrons were withdrawn from operations in Iraq during Summer 2003.

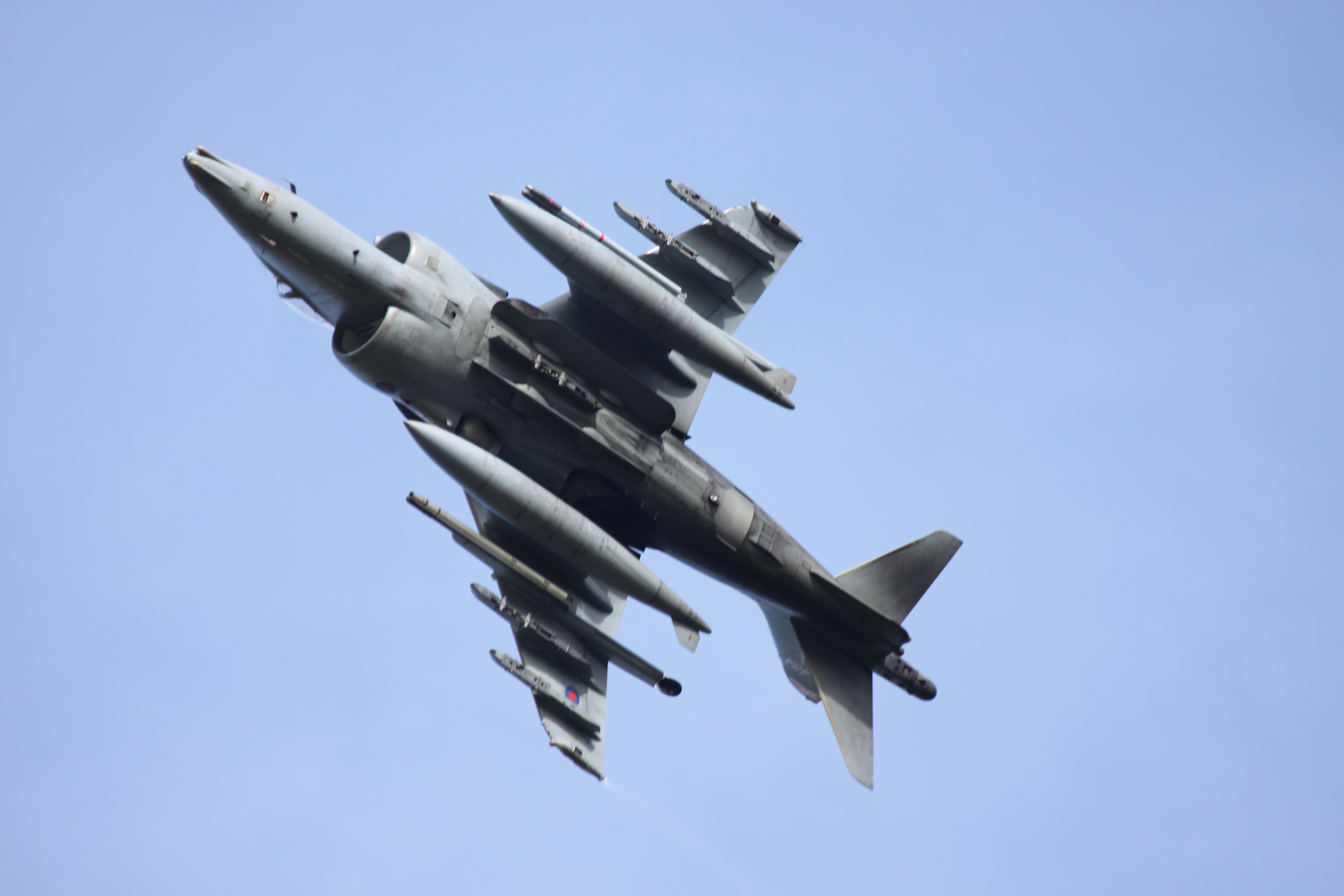
Underside of a Harrier flying at a steep banked angle, 2010

RAF Harriers would be a regular element of Britain's contribution to the War in Afghanistan. In September 2004, six Harrier GR7s were deployed to Kandahar, Afghanistan, replacing a US detachment of AV-8Bs in the region. On 14 October 2005, a Harrier GR7A was destroyed and another was damaged while parked on the tarmac at Kandahar by a Taliban rocket attack. No one was injured in the attack; the damaged Harrier was repaired, while the destroyed aircraft was replaced.

While initial operations in Afghanistan had focused on intimidation and reconnaissance, demand for interdiction missions using the Harrier II spiked dramatically during the Helmand province campaign. Between July and September 2006, the theatre total for munitions deployed by British Harriers on planned operations and close air support to ground forces rose from 179 to 539, the majority being CRV-7 rockets. The Harrier IIs had also switched to 24-hour availability, having formerly operated mostly during the day.

In January 2007, the Harrier GR9 began its first operational deployment at Kandahar, as part of the NATO International Security Assistance Force (ISAF); Harrier GR7s would be progressively withdrawn in favour of the newer Harrier GR9. Following five years of continuous operations in Afghanistan, the last of Britain's Harriers were withdrawn from the Afghan theatre in June 2009, having flown over 22,000 hours on 8,500 sorties, they were replaced by several RAF Tornado GR4s.

=== Rundown ===
In 2005, allegations emerged in Parliament that, following the transfer of servicing duties to RAF Cottesmore, the standard and quality of maintenance on the Harrier fleet had fallen dramatically; several airframes had been considerably damaged and one likely destroyed due to mistakes made, the time taken to perform the servicing had risen from 100 days to 155 days, and the cost per aircraft had also risen to more than ten times that of the prior arrangements performed by Defence Aviation Repair Agency (DARA).

In 2006, the Sea Harrier was retired from Fleet Air Arm service and the Harrier GR7/9 fleet was tasked with the missions that it used to share with those aircraft. The former Sea Harrier squadron 800 Naval Air Squadron reformed with ex-RAF Harrier GR7/9s in April 2006 and joined by the re-formed 801 Naval Air Squadron in 2007. These later expanded and become the Naval Strike Wing. On 31 March 2010, No. 20 Squadron RAF, the Harrier Operational Conversion Unit (OCU), was disbanded; No. 4 Squadron also disbanded and reformed as No. 4 (Reserve) Squadron at RAF Wittering. All Harrier GR7 aircraft were retired by July 2010.

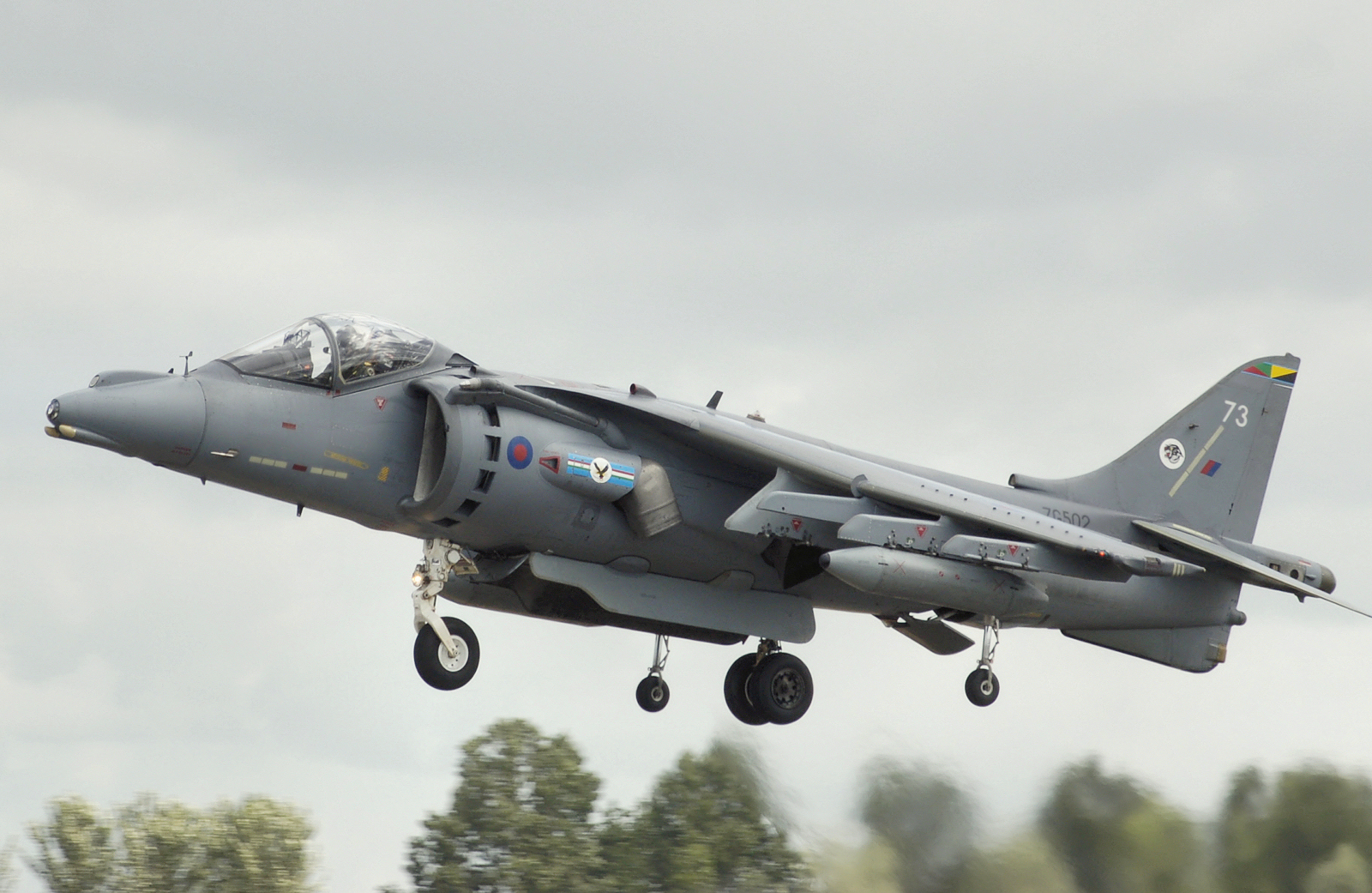
Harrier GR9 demonstrating its hover capability at RIAT 2008

The Harrier GR9 was expected to stay in service at least until 2018. However, on 19 October 2010 it was announced in the Strategic Defence and Security Review that the Harrier was to be retired by April 2011. In the long term, the F-35B Lightning II, would operate from the Navy's two new Queen Elizabeth-class aircraft carriers. The decision to retire the Harrier was controversial, with some senior officers calling for the Panavia Tornado to be retired as an alternative; the decision having left Britain without any fixed-wing aircraft capable of flying from the navy's aircraft carriers.

On 24 November 2010, the Harrier made its last flight from a carrier, incidentally also the last flight from the carrier HMS Ark Royal prior to retirement. The fleet's last operational flights occurred on 15 December 2010 with fly pasts over numerous military bases. In November 2011, the Ministry of Defence sold 72 Harrier IIs, along with spare parts, to the United States Marine Corps for £116 million (US$180 million); the aircraft to be used as a source of components for the AV-8B Harrier II fleet.

According to a report by Air Forces Monthly, some of the 72 Harrier IIs were to fly again, as the USMC planned to equip two squadrons with GR.9/9A models due to the well-maintained condition of the airframes when inspected at RAF Cottesmore, where the aircraft were stored and maintained by a skeleton crew of technicians following their retirement. This was contradicted by the US Naval Air Systems Command (NAVAIR) in June 2012, who stated that the USMC never planned to operate ex-RAF Harriers.

== Variants ==
GR.5
The GR5 was the RAF's first model of the second-generation Harrier. The GR5 considerably differed from the USMC AV-8B in terms of avionics, armaments and countermeasures. Forty one GR5s were built.

GR.5A
The GR5A was a minor variant, incorporating design changes in anticipation of the GR7 upgrade. Twenty-one GR5As were built.

GR.7
The GR7 is an upgraded model of the GR5. The first GR7 conducted its maiden flight in May 1990, and made its first operational deployment in August 1995 over the former Yugoslavia.

GR.7A
The GR7A feature an uprated Pegasus 107 engine. GR7As upgraded to GR9 standard retain the A designation as GR9As. The Mk 107 engine provides around 3,000 lbf (13 kN) extra thrust over the Mk 105's 21,750 lbf (98 kN) thrust.

GR.9
The GR9 is an upgrade of the GR7, focused on the Harrier II's avionics and weapons. Upgraded under the JUMP programme.

GR.9A
All Harrier GR9 aircraft were modified to be able to take either Mk105 or Mk107 Pegasus Engine. When an airframe had a Mk107 actually fitted it became a GR9A, and if the engine was subsequently changed back to a Mk105 it reverted to GR9. This was done because the MoD only procured a limited number of Mk107 engines and allocated them to individual aircraft based on tasking requirements.

T.10
The Harrier T10 is the first two seat training variant of the Harrier II; based on the USMC Harrier trainer the TAV-8B. Unlike their American counterparts, the T10s are fully combat-capable. (Note: According to aviation author Lon Nordeen, the RAF had originally intended to modernise its first generation T.4/4A two-seat trainers in order to perform the trainer role for the Harrier II; however pilots noted that training upon a variant in which the cockpit and controls would be far more comparable to the newer Harrier II would have greater benefits and have less limitations, thus in 1990 the Ministry of Defence placed an order for 14 combat-capable twin-seat aircraft.)

T.12
Update of the trainers to accompany the GR9. Nine T10 aircraft received the JUMP updates under the designation T12, however these would retain the less powerful Pegasus 105 engine.

T.12A
Equivalent to the T.12, however differs by being equipped with the newer and more powerful Mk 107 Pegasus engine of the GR7A/9A. The T12A configuration was a proposal to allow the more powerful engine to be fitted for hover training during the hotter summer months so that the aircraft could hover at higher weights (more fuel) for longer hover training sorties.

== Operators ==
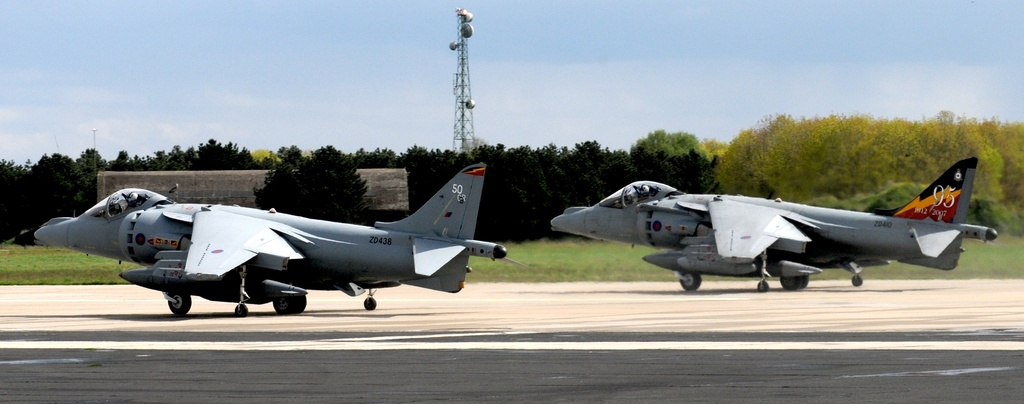
A pair of Harrier GR7s, 2008

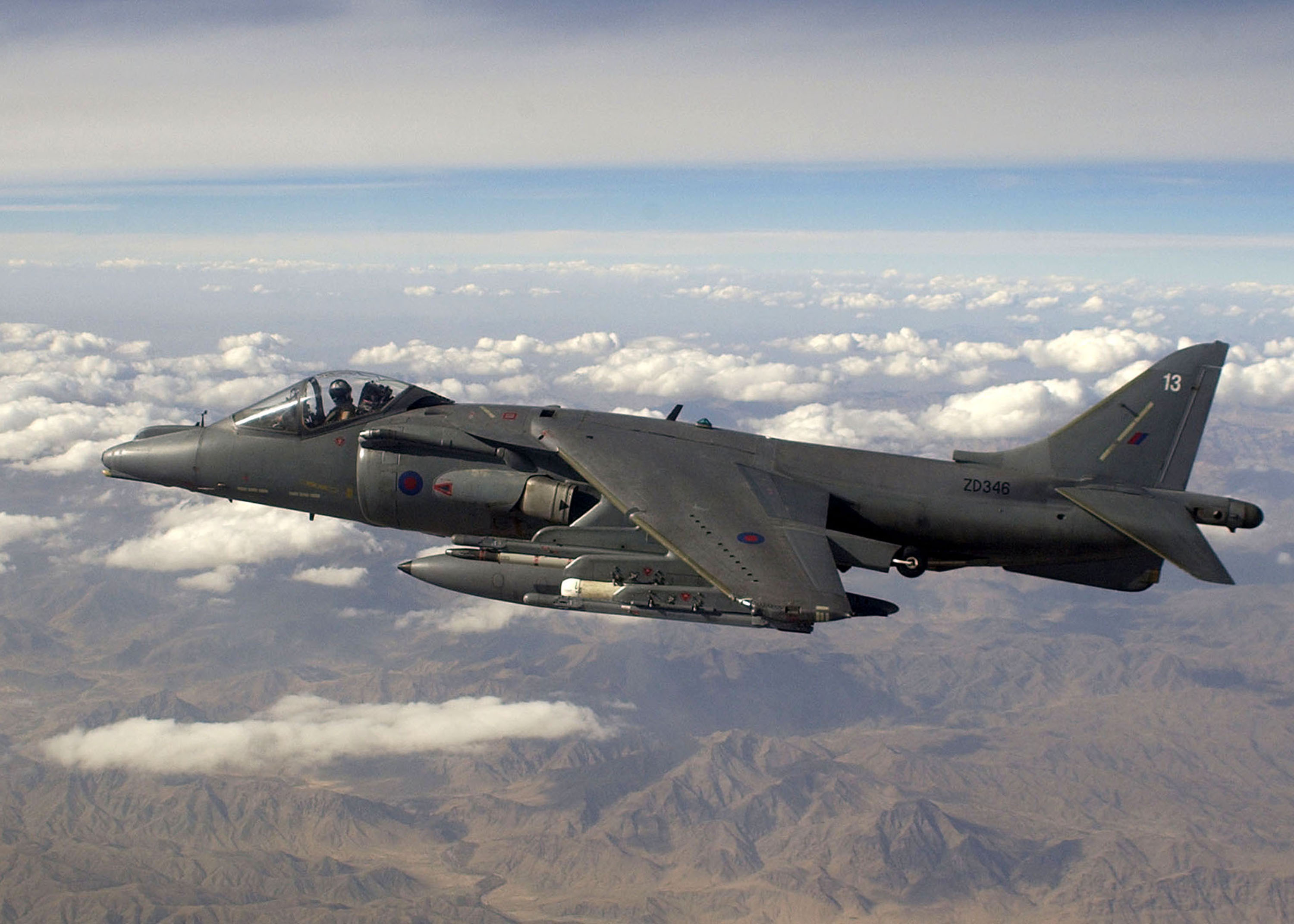
An RAF Harrier GR7A flying over Afghanistan, 2004

United Kingdom

- Royal Air Force (1988–2011)
  - No. 1 (Fighter) Squadron (October 1988 – January 2011)
  - No. 3 (Fighter) Squadron (March 1989 – March 2006)
  - No. IV (Army Co-operation) / (Reserve) Squadron (September 1990 – January 2011)
  - No. 20 (Reserve) Squadron (September 1992 – March 2010)
  - Strike Attack Operational Evaluation Unit (SAOEU) (1988 – 2004)
  - Fast Jet & Weapons Operational Evaluation Unit
- Royal Navy Fleet Air Arm
  - 800 Naval Air Squadron (March 2006 – March 2007; 2010)
  - Naval Strike Wing (March 2007 – April 2010)

== Aircraft on display ==
United Kingdom

- Harrier GR.7 ZD318 on display at the Harrier Heritage Museum, RAF Wittering, Cambridgeshire, England
- Harrier GR.9A ZD433 on display at the Fleet Air Arm Museum, RNAS Yeovilton, Somerset, England
- Harrier GR.9A ZD461 on display at the Imperial War Museum, London, England
- Harrier GR.7 ZD462 on display at Dyson HQ, Malmesbury, Wiltshire, England
- Harrier GR.9 ZD465 on display at HMS Sultan, Gosport, Hampshire, England
- Harrier GR.7A ZD469 on the gate at RAF Wittering, Cambridgeshire, England
- Harrier GR.9 ZG477 on display at the Royal Air Force Museum London, Hendon, England
- Harrier GR.7 ZG509 on display near Petersfield, Hampshire, England

United States

- Harrier GR.5 ZD353 on display at the Pima Air & Space Museum, Tucson, Arizona

== Specifications (Harrier GR7) ==
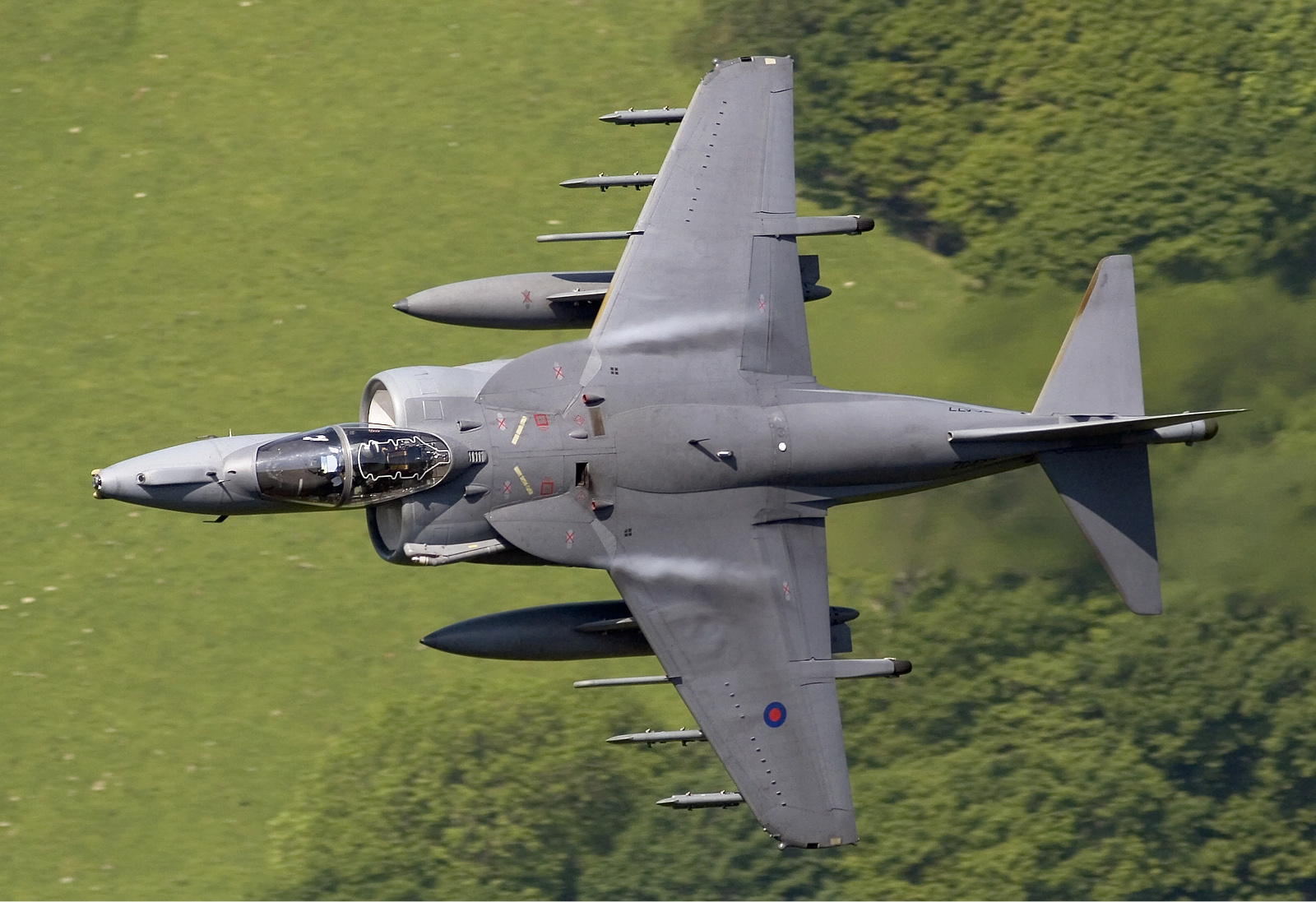
Overhead view of a Harrier GR9, 2006

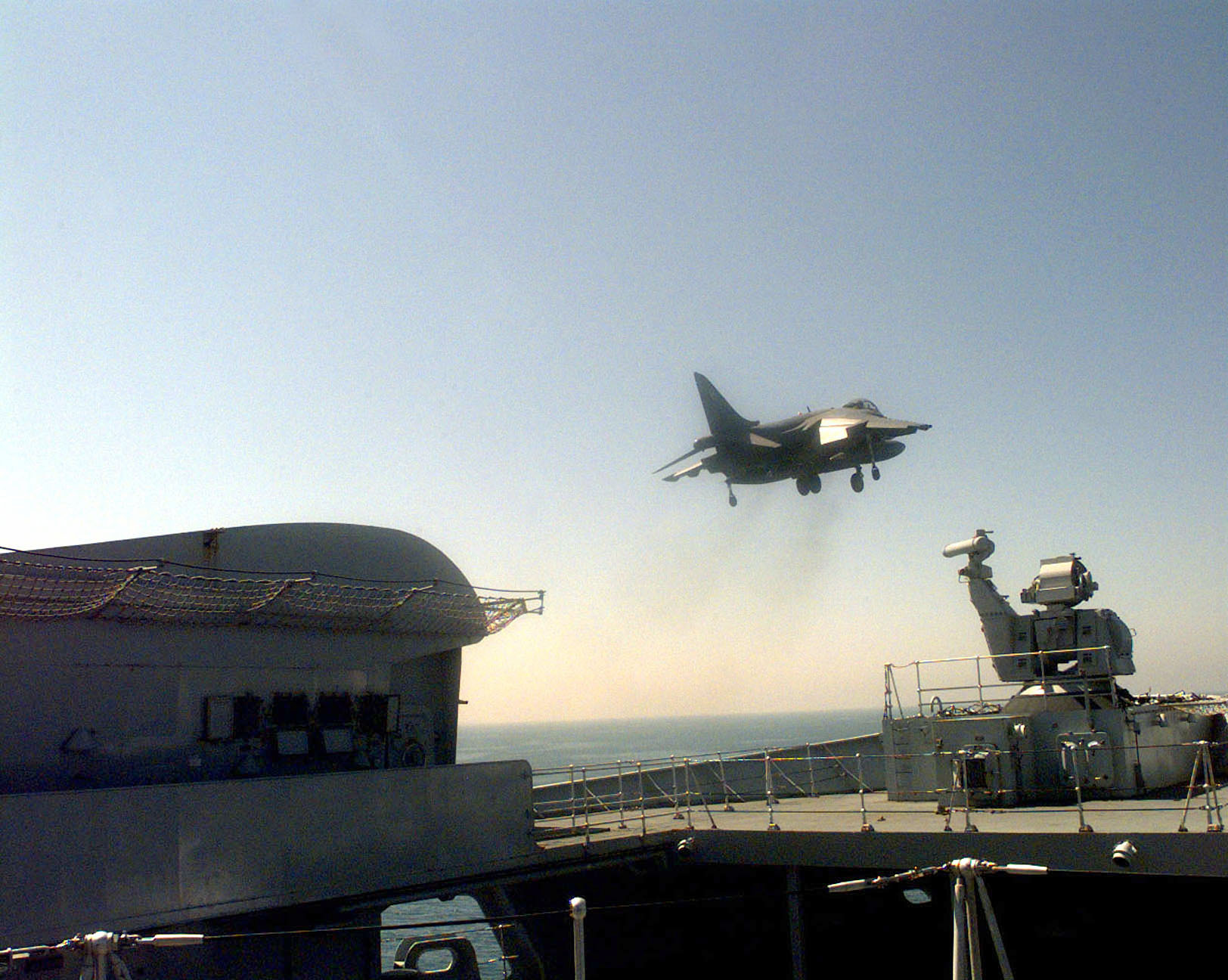
A Harrier GR7 taking off from the aircraft carrier HMS Illustrious in the Persian Gulf, 1998

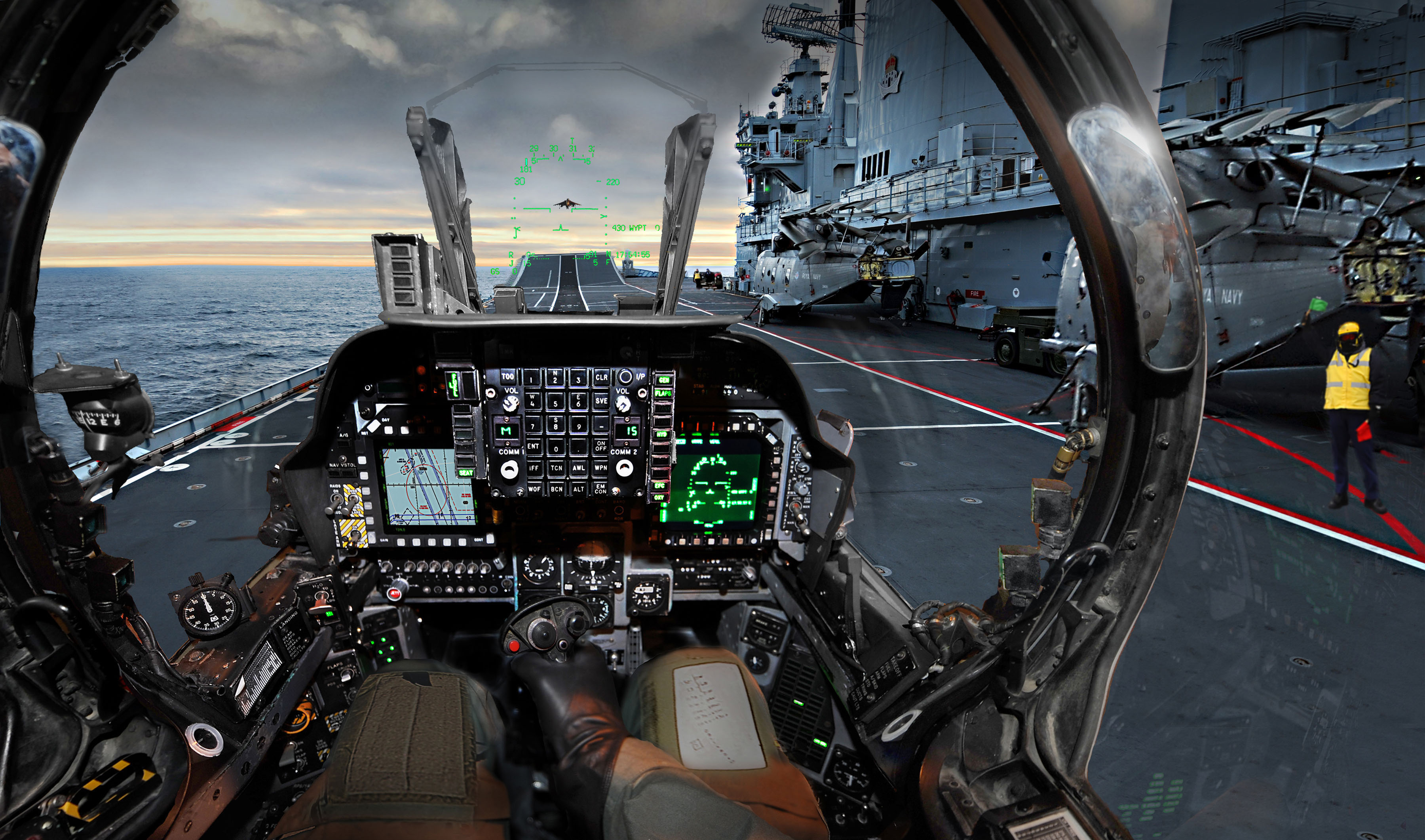
Digitally manipulated image of the interior of a Harrier cockpit while preparing to take off from the aircraft carrier HMS Ark Royal, 2010

Data from Harrier II, Validating V/STOL

General characteristics

- Crew: 1
- Length: 46 ft 4 in (14.12 m)
- Wingspan: 30 ft 4 in (9.25 m)
- Height: 11 ft 8 in (3.56 m)
- Wing area: 243 sq ft (22.6 m^{2})
- Empty weight: 12,500 lb (5,670 kg)
- Gross weight: 15,703 lb (7,123 kg)
- Max takeoff weight: 31,000 lb (14,061 kg) STO

18,950 lb (8,596 kg)

- Powerplant: 1 × Rolls-Royce Pegasus Mk. 105 turbofan engine, 21,750 lbf (96.7 kN) thrust with water injection

Performance

- Maximum speed: 575 kn (662 mph, 1,065 km/h)
- Combat range: 300 nmi (350 mi, 560 km)
- Ferry range: 1,758 nmi (2,023 mi, 3,256 km) with 4× drop tanks
- Service ceiling: 50,000 ft (15,000 m)
- Rate of climb: 14,715 ft/min (74.75 m/s)

Armament

- Guns: 2× 25 mm ADEN cannon pods under the fuselage (Cleared for emergency use)
- Hardpoints: 8 (under-wing pylon stations 1A & 7A are intended for air-to-air missiles only.) with a capacity of 8,000 lb (3,650 kg) of payload, with provisions to carry combinations of:
  - Rockets: LAU-5003 rocket pods (19× CRV7 70 mm rockets each) or Matra rocket pods (18× SNEB 68 mm rockets each)
  - Missiles: 4× AIM-9 Sidewinders or 6x AIM-9 Sidewinders (with an adaptor on the intermediate pylon) 4× AGM-65 Maverick
  - Bombs: ordnance such as Paveway II/III/IV, Enhanced Paveway II/II+ series of laser-guided bombs, unguided 540 and 1,000 lb (240 and 450 kg) bombs (including 3 kg and 14 kg practice bombs)
  - Other: 2× auxiliary drop tanks or reconnaissance pod (such as the Joint Reconnaissance Pod) (TIALD pod would replace ADEN guns when mounted.)

- Recce/targeting pods: DJRP, Sniper, and TIALD

Avionics
GEC-Marconi (Plessey) PVS-2000 Missile approach warning system

== See also ==
- Harrier jump jet, an overview of the Harrier family

Related development

- British Aerospace Sea Harrier
- Hawker Siddeley Harrier
- McDonnell Douglas AV-8B Harrier II

Aircraft of comparable role, configuration, and era

- Yakovlev Yak-38

Related lists

- List of active United Kingdom military aircraft
- List of Harrier family losses
