= HMS Trafalgar =

Five ships of the Royal Navy have been named HMS Trafalgar, after the Battle of Trafalgar:

- HMS Trafalgar (1820) was a 106-gun first rate launched in 1820. She was renamed HMS Camperdown in 1825, was used for harbour service from 1854 and became a coal hulk in 1857. She was renamed HMS Pitt in 1882 and was sold in 1906.
- HMS Trafalgar (1841) was a 120-gun Caledonia-class first rate launched in 1841. She was converted to screw propulsion in 1859, and was renamed HMS Boscawen in 1873. She was sold in 1906.
- HMS Trafalgar (1887) was a Trafalgar-class battleship launched in 1887 and sold in 1911.
- HMS Trafalgar (D77) was a Battle-class destroyer launched in 1944 and sold in 1970.
- HMS Trafalgar (S107) is a Trafalgar-class submarine launched in 1981 and decommissioned in 2009.
