= Future of the Royal Navy =

Future planning of the Royal Navy's capabilities is set through periodic Defence Reviews carried out by the UK Government.

In July 2024, the newly elected Labour Government launched a Strategic Defence Review, the results of which began to be released in the first half of 2025. The Secretary of State for Defence, John Healey, had been overseeing the review. However, he resigned on 11 June 2026, indicating his dissatisfaction with the Government's failure to provide adequate funding for defence. The Armed Forces Minister, Al Carns, also resigned at that time.

In November 2024, the government had announced some initial results of the review which involved the retirement of the Navy's Albion-class assault ships, one frigate as well as two Wave-class replenishment vessels from the Royal Fleet Auxiliary by March 2025. In June 2025, initial recommendations of the Strategic Defence Review were released, along with an announcement by the government that it would aim to incrementally increase the strength of the Royal Navy's fleet submarines to up to 12 boats starting in the latter 2030s. Full outcomes of the Government's planned Defence Investment Plan (DIP) began to be released in late June 2026.

In 2020, a plan had been announced to construct a new class of frigate, the Type 32 frigate, with five vessels envisaged and likely entering service starting in the early 2030s, though many other details about the program were undecided, even following publication of the March 2021 defence white paper. The previous government planned to increase the Royal Navy's fleet to 24 frigates and destroyers, perhaps achieving that objective by the mid-2030s. However, this plan was abandoned in the 2026 DIP with the Type 32 being formally cancelled in favour of future drone vessels.

As of September 2025, the following major vessels are under construction: the final submarine of seven Astute-class submarines; all four of the Dreadnought-class ballistic missile submarines, the first five of eight Type 26 frigates; and four of the five Type 31 frigates. And the first one of three fleet solid support ships for the Royal Fleet Auxiliary.

== Funding outlook ==
The National Audit Office (NAO) has, for a considerable period of time, described the Ministry of Defence's equipment plan as "unaffordable". As late as January 2021 the NAO reported that the Royal Navy had the largest shortfall of the three services at £4.3 billion over the 2020 to 2030 period. To address some of these gaps, in November 2020, Conservative Prime Minister Boris Johnson announced the first outcome of the defence review by pledging increased funding in the range of £16.5 billion over four years to stabilise the defence budget and to provide new funding for space, cyber and research activities.

In March 2023, a further £5 billion in funding was announced as part of a defence policy "refresh" exercise to "help replenish and bolster vital ammunition stocks, modernise the UK's nuclear enterprise and fund the next phase of the AUKUS submarine programme". However, in December 2023 the NAO again described the MoD's defence plan for 2023–2033 as "unaffordable" and some £16.9 billion over budget. Forecast costs for the Navy were reported to have risen by £16.4 billion (or 41%). Spending decisions were expected to be made during the next spending review in 2024, at which point more funding might be allocated or other decisions taken. In April 2024, Conservative Prime Minister Rishi Sunak pledged to increase defence spending to 2.5% of Gross domestic product (GDP) (or £81 billion) by 2030. The Labour Party pledged to raise defence spending to the same level, with the promise to reach 3% in the next Parliament. The same objective was maintained in the 2025 Strategic Defence Review, though the Government now pledged to reach the 2.5% goal by 2027 and to devote 3.5% of GDP to "traditional defence spending" by 2035.

In October 2025, the MOD projected a £2 billion overspend of its budget in the 2025/26 financial year. Two months later, the Royal Navy announced it will reduce overseas training in the Indo-Pacific and the Middle East, such as the recent Carrier Strike Group 25 to the Pacific Ocean in 2025.

Spending on renewing the continuous at sea nuclear deterrent and other nuclear submarine programmes through the Defence Nuclear Enterprise is projected to increase to between 20% and 25% of the whole MOD budget in the late 2020s, putting cost pressure on other spending.

At the time of Healey's resignation in early June 2026, reports suggested the government was preparing to announce a £13.5 billion funding increase for the MOD over four years, though the MOD had requested an extra £28 billion. After Dan Jarvis replaced Healey as defence secretary, an additional £1.5 billion was added to the DIP prior to its unveiling, increasing total new funding to £15 billion.

== Ships ordered or under construction ==
=== Royal Navy ===
The following is a list of vessels ordered, under construction or fitting out within the United Kingdom, and destined for the Royal Navy:

Class	Ship	Pennant No.	Builders	Displacement	Type	Homeport	Commissioning (planned)	Notes
Submarines
Astute class	Achilles	S125	BAE Systems, Barrow-in-Furness	7,400 tonnes	Fleet submarine	Clyde	Around 2028 - 2029	
SSN-AUKUS class	TBA	TBA	BAE Systems, Barrow-in-Furness	≥ 10,000 tonnes	Fleet submarine	Clyde	Late 2030s	Up to 12 planned.
Dreadnought class	Dreadnought	TBA	BAE Systems, Barrow-in-Furness	17,200 tonnes	Ballistic missile submarine	Clyde	Early 2030s	
Dreadnought class	Valiant	TBA	BAE Systems, Barrow-in-Furness	17,200 tonnes	Ballistic missile submarine	Clyde	TBA	
Dreadnought class	Warspite	TBA	BAE Systems, Barrow-in-Furness	17,200 tonnes	Ballistic missile submarine	Clyde	TBA	
Dreadnought class	King George VI	TBA	BAE Systems, Barrow-in-Furness	17,200 tonnes	Ballistic missile submarine	Clyde	TBA	
Frigates
Type 26 class	Glasgow	F88	BAE Systems, Glasgow	7,700 tonnes	Multi-mission frigate	Devonport	Late 2027 - early 2028	
Type 26 class	Cardiff	F89	BAE Systems, Glasgow	7,700 tonnes	Multi-mission frigate	Devonport	From 2028 - 2029	
Type 26 class	Belfast	F90	BAE Systems, Glasgow	7,700 tonnes	Multi-mission frigate	Devonport	From 2028 - 2029	
Type 26 class	Birmingham	TBA	BAE Systems, Glasgow	7,700 tonnes	Multi-mission frigate	Devonport	From 2028 - 2029	
Type 26 class	Sheffield	TBA	BAE Systems, Glasgow	7,700 tonnes	Multi-mission frigate	Devonport	From 2028 - 2029	
Type 26 class	Newcastle	TBA	BAE Systems, Glasgow	7,700 tonnes	Multi-mission frigate	Devonport	From 2028 - 2029	
Type 26 class	Edinburgh	TBA	BAE Systems, Glasgow	7,700 tonnes	Multi-mission frigate	Devonport	From 2028 - 2029	
Type 26 class	London	TBA	BAE Systems, Glasgow	7,700 tonnes	Multi-mission frigate	Devonport	From 2028 - 2029	
Type 31 class	Venturer	F12	Babcock International, Rosyth	5,700 tonnes	General-purpose frigate	Portsmouth	By 2028/29	
Type 31 class	Active	F08	Babcock International, Rosyth	5,700 tonnes	General-purpose frigate	Portsmouth	Early 2030s	
Type 31 class	Formidable	F11	Babcock International, Rosyth	5,700 tonnes	General-purpose frigate	Portsmouth	Early 2030s	
Type 31 class	Bulldog	F09	Babcock International, Rosyth	5,700 tonnes	General-purpose frigate	Portsmouth	Early 2030s	
Type 31 class	Campbeltown	F10	Babcock International, Rosyth	5,700 tonnes	General-purpose frigate	Portsmouth	Early 2030s	
Mine hunting 'motherships'
P1118 class Standardised Vessel	TBA	TBA	TBC	Up to c. 5,000 tonnes	Mine hunting mother ship	TBA	From 2031	
P1118 class Standardised Vessel	TBA	TBA	TBC	Up to c. 5,000 tonnes	Mine hunting mother ship	TBA	From 2031	
P1118 class Standardised Vessel	TBA	TBA	TBC	Up to c. 5,000 tonnes	Mine hunting mother ship	TBA	From 2031	

=== Royal Fleet Auxiliary ===
The following is a list of vessels ordered for the Royal Fleet Auxiliary:

Class	Ship	Pennant No.	Builders	Displacement	Type	Homeport	Commissioning (planned)	Notes
Amphibious transport ship
ATS class	TBA	TBA	Damen (design); British shipyard (TBA)	15,000 tonnes	LPD	TBA	From 2032	Planning stage
ATS class	TBA	TBA	Damen (design); British shipyard (TBA)	15,000 tonnes	LPD	TBA	From 2032	Planning stage
ATS class	TBA	TBA	Damen (design); British shipyard (TBA)	15,000 tonnes	LPD	TBA	From 2032	Planning stage
ATS class	TBA	TBA	Damen (design); British shipyard (TBA)	15,000 tonnes	LPD	TBA	From 2032	Planning stage
Replenishment vessels
Fleet Solid Support Ship class	Resurgent	TBA	Harland & Wolff, BMT Group and Navantia UK	39,000 tonnes	Fleet Solid Support Ship	Devonport	2031	
Fleet Solid Support Ship class	Reliant	TBA	Harland & Wolff, BMT Group and Navantia UK	39,000 tonnes	Fleet Solid Support Ship	Devonport	Early 2030s	
Fleet Solid Support Ship class	Resourceful	TBA	Harland & Wolff, BMT Group and Navantia UK	39,000 tonnes	Fleet Solid Support Ship	Devonport	Early 2030s	

== Ships ==
=== Destroyers and frigates ===
From the 2010 Strategic Defence and Security Review (SDSR - which set the total number of destroyers and frigates in the Royal Navy at 19 ships) up until the 2026 DIP, the replacement of the destroyers and frigates had been envisaged on a more or less one-for-one basis. In 2012, BAE Systems Naval Ships was awarded a contract to design the replacement, known as the Type 26 Global Combat Ship (GCS). It was planned that two variants of the class would be built: five general purpose frigates and eight anti-submarine warfare frigates. However, the 2015 Defence Review indicated that only eight Type 26 frigates would be built with the remaining five ships covered by a new class of lighter, flexible general purpose frigate, known as the Type 31e frigate or General Purpose Frigate (GPFF).

The slower than planned introduction of both the Type 26 and Type 31, coupled with the pending retirement dates for the Type 23, has meant a gradual reduction of Royal Navy frigate numbers to just five operational frigates by the end of 2025, together with six Type 45 destroyers. While the 2021 Defence White Paper had envisaged increasing the destroyer/frigate fleet in the 2030s to around 24 frigates and destroyers by introducing yet another class of frigate, the Type 32, this plan was formally cancelled in the 2026 DIP in favour of entirely new vessels. The DIP also cancelled the envisaged Type 83 destroyer as the replacement of the Type 45 destroyer.

The DIP envisages the procurement of "at least" six new "Common Combat Vessels" (CCV) to replace the current fleet of Type 45 destroyers in the 2030s. The CCVs are to be a 'Hybrid' warship, "coordinating uncrewed systems in the air, on the surface and under the sea to deliver more resilient air defence". They are to act as a "control hub for uncrewed systems - extending the Navy's reach, resilience and firepower without a proportional increase in crew or cost". The CCV is to operate along the still planned fleet of Type 26 and Type 31 frigates as well as new unmanned drones envisaged for procurement including: the Type 91 "uncrewed missile platform", Type 92 "uncrewed underwater sensing platform", Type 93 "Extra-Large Uncrewed Underwater Vehicle" and Type 94 "uncrewed sensor platform". However, the timing for the acquisition of all of these systems, and their introduction into service, remained unclear.

The introduction of more personnel efficient ships partially responds to the reality of the significant recruiting challenges that the navy is facing with a net drop of some 1,600 personnel (4 percent of the force) from mid-2022 to mid-2023. The cancellation of the expensive Type 83 and Type 32 platforms, and the complementary move to unmanned platforms, is also designed to assist in addressing ongoing funding pressures in naval procurement which were not addressed in the DIP to the satisfaction of Defence Secretary Healey as indicated in his resignation. It is also possible that the Royal Navy frigate force will decline still further since some of the remaining Type 23 frigates may have to be withdrawn from service due to age and serviceability issues. Simultaneously, some of the early vessels in the Type 26 programme may be transferred to the Royal Norwegian Navy instead, thus resulting in an overall drop in frigate numbers in the latter 2020s before there is a recovery in the 2030s.

=== Uncrewed surface vessels & sensor platforms ===
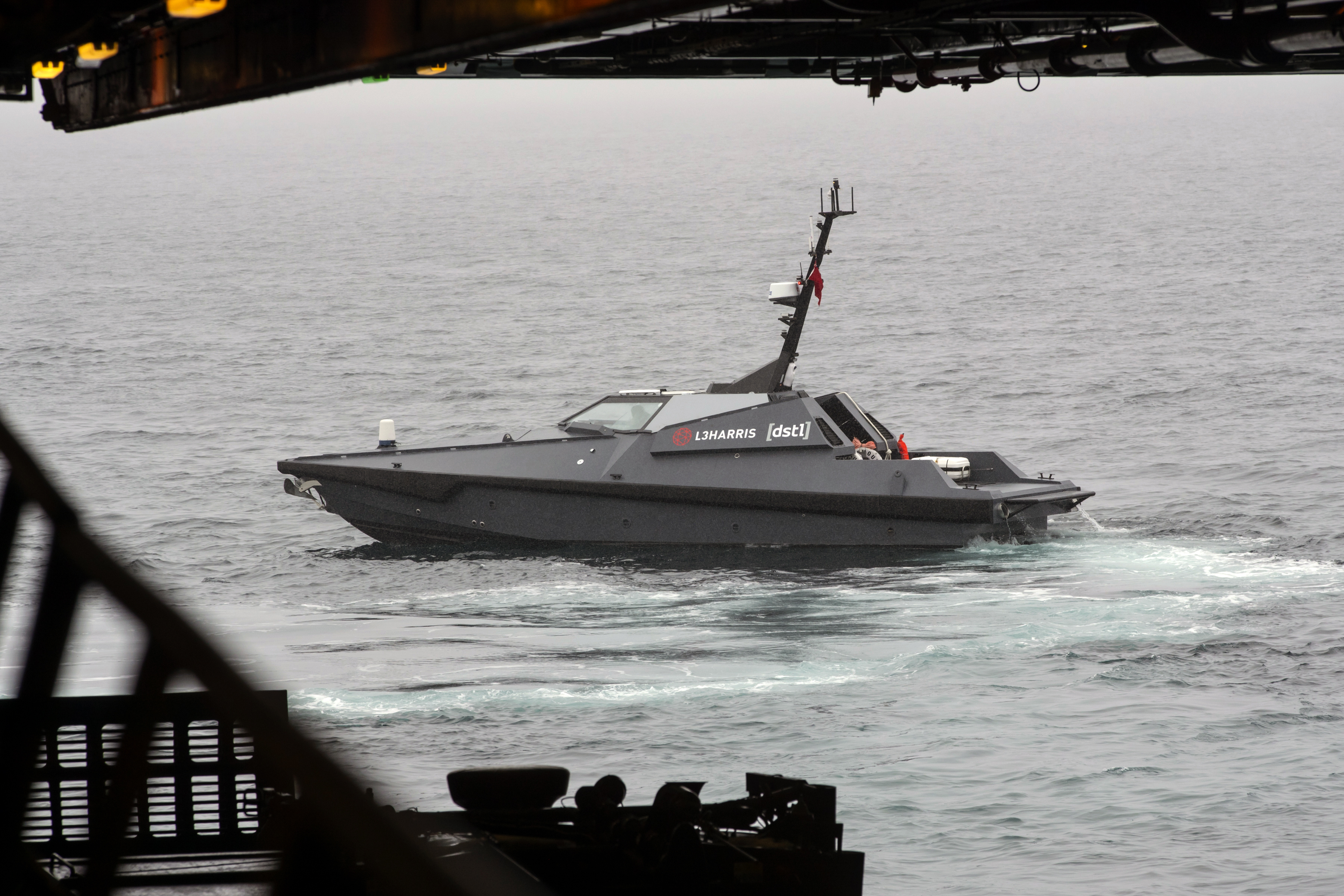
Madfox ASV during trials in March 2020

In recent years the Royal Navy has examined varied options relation to the deployment and development of unmanned surface vessels. This has included the Maritime Autonomy Surface Testbed (MAST) 13 programs, a collaboration between Defence Science and Technology Laboratory (Dstl) and L3Harris Technologies employing the autonomous surface vessel Madfox. Other programs have focused on the development of autonomous minehunting capabilities to replace the Royal Navy's crewed mine countermeasures vessels.

The 2026 Defence Investment Plan placed a heavy emphasis on the acquisition of new autonomous systems. For the Royal Navy this is to involve the procurement of several vessel types:

- the Type 91 "uncrewed missile platform" ("to increase the firepower of the Hybrid Fleet");
- the Type 92 "uncrewed underwater sensing platform" (or uncrewed Sloop "designed to hunt enemy submarines across the North Atlantic, supporting our new frigates"); and,
- the Type 94 "uncrewed sensor platform" (or uncrewed Radar picket vessel "designed to scan the skies for threats to the hybrid navy or the homeland").

Six Common Combat Vessels are envisaged to act as the "brain of a networked Maritime Air Defence system". The Royal Marines are also to be equipped with new high-speed boats and the "latest drone and autonomous technology". The DIP indicated that the first large autonomous vessels will be brought into service by 2030, including a prototype uncrewed missile platform with payloads developed through AUKUS.

=== Mine countermeasures and Hydrographic Capability (MHC) ===
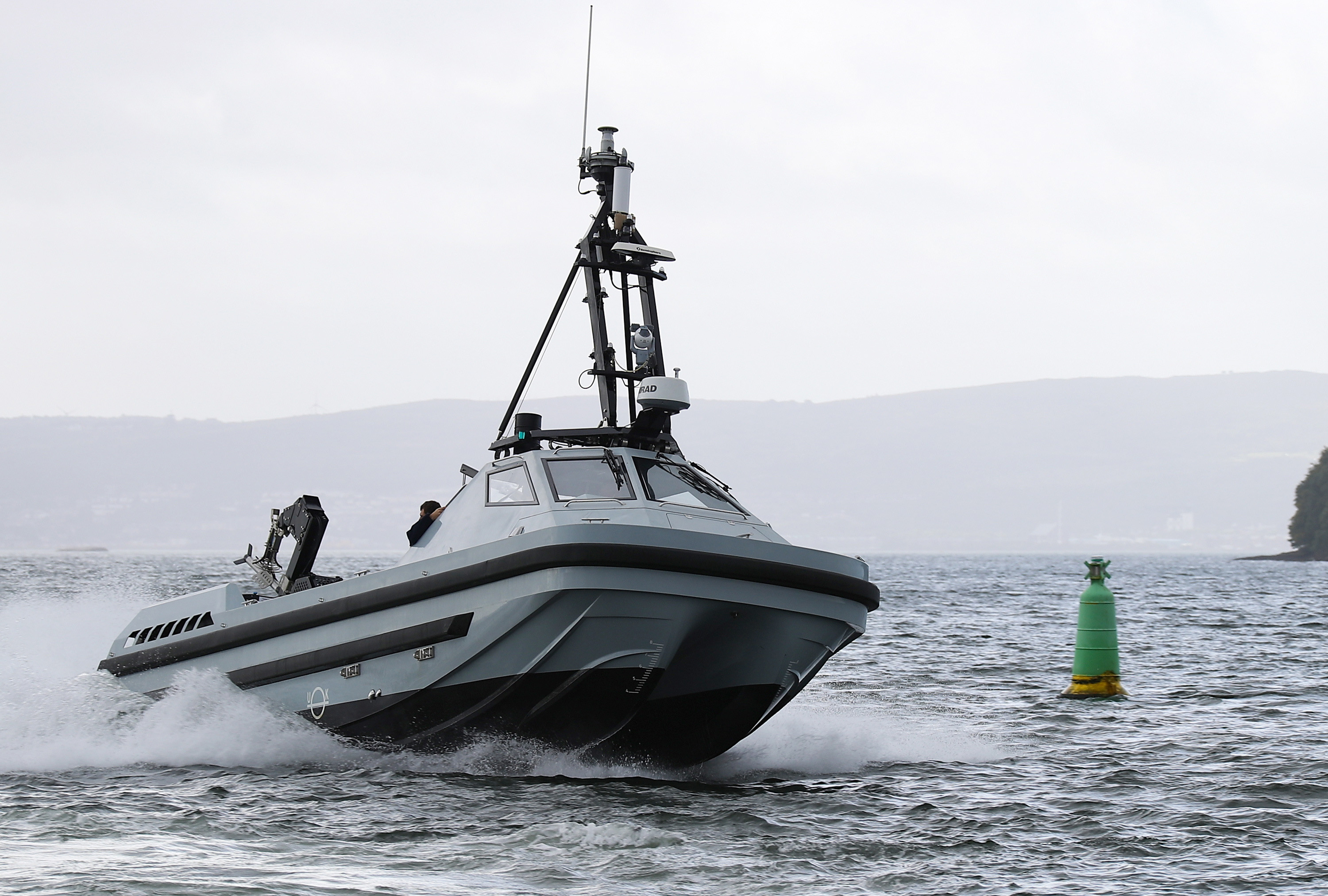
RNMB Harrier on the Clyde in 2020

The 2015 SDSR specified that only 12 mine-counter measure vessels were planned to exist in Joint Force 2025. The three oldest Sandown-class minehunters were decommissioned. At one point it was anticipated that the UK and France would collaborate on a Maritime Mine Counter Measures project. At DESI 2017, the First Sea Lord mentioned that the Royal Navy aimed to accelerate the incremental delivery of future mine countermeasures and hydrographic capability (MHC) programme.

All of these plans notwithstanding, in 2020 the parliamentary National Audit Office (NAO) noted that no funding had been allocated in the 2019 to 2029 period to replace the Navy's mine countermeasures capability. The 2021 defence white paper subsequently confirmed that all existing MCMV vessels would be phased out in the 2020s and replaced by autonomous systems.

Preliminary measures were taken to equip the Royal navy with autonomous minehunting systems and in May 2015, a contract was signed with Atlas Elektronik UK to supply Unmanned surface vessels (USVs) of their ARCIMS system for autonomous mine clearance. The first boat delivered under this contract was the optionally-manned RNMB Hazard, and the remaining boats were delivered by 2025.

Further components in the Mine Hunting Capability (MHC) Program include the U.K.-French MCM program, which is to deliver four sets of systems (each of which includes: a Portable Operation Center (POC), Two Thales / L3Harris 12-metre Unmanned Surface Vessels - USVs -, a towed Synthetic Aperture Multiviews (T-SAM) vehicle and a Multi-Shot Mine Neutralisation System (MuMNS)). Two full rate production systems had been delivered by 2026 with the remaining systems to follow.

While in the early 2020s, the British Government explored the idea of using the envisaged Type 32 frigate as a "mothership" for the Navy's future unmanned mine countermeasures capabilities, the acquisition of the former offshore support vessel MV Island Crown for the Royal Fleet Auxiliary heralded the future direction of the Royal Navy's minehunting force. The new vessel, named RFA Stirling Castle, was to act as a trials platform for autonomous minehunting systems. She was purchased for 40 million pounds and arrived at HMNB Devonport for a quick conversion to the role in January 2023, though she was subsequently transferred to the Royal Navy (now as HMS Stirling Castle) from the RFA due to the RFA's acute crewing problems.

The 2026 DIP indicated that, going forward, £90 would be invested in the autonomous minehunting programme "to procure offshore support vessels (OSVs) in conjunction with Norway". In November 2026, it was announced that, in conjunction with Norway, the navy would procure three P-1118 standardised vessels (with an option on three more) to act as mine hunting "motherships" for autonomous systems. The first vessels were envisaged for delivery in 2031.

=== Future amphibious capability ===
The envisaged future composition of the UK's amphibious warfare capabilities has gone through several iterations, settling from 2021 on the replacement of the Navy's Albion-class assault ships, as well as the Royal Fleet Auxiliary's Bay-class landing ships and RFA Argus, by a new class of up to six Multi Role Support/Strike Ships (MRSS). However, the Albion-class vessels were subsequently retired from service early, while RFA Argus was taken out of service in 2025 as no longer seaworthy.

The new MRSS vessels would therefore only be ready to replace these now retired vessels in the 2030s and were also, as of late 2022, facing significant funding pressures. The November 2022 report of the National Audit Office on The Equipment Plan 2022-2032 stated that in July 2022 "Navy Command withdrew its plans for Type 32 frigates and MRSS because of concerns about unaffordability. The revised costing profile is likely to be significantly higher".

In June 2023, the British and Dutch governments then announced that the two countries would "explore opportunities" to jointly develop new specialist amphibious warships. However, that idea was subsequently dropped and in May 2024, the defence secretary, Grant Shapps, stated that the U.K. would build its vessels independently with three MRSS vessels to be built initially together with a plan for up to three additional ships.

The 2026 DIP, however, returned to the idea of U.K. participation in the procurement of a joint-British-Dutch future ATS-class amphibious warfare ship, stating that "The Multi-Role Strike Ship (MRSS) programme was too complex and did not reflect the UK Commando Force we are now pursuing". The timing for any future delivery of a new capability was likely in the 2030s meaning that the naval service would have to soldier-on with only the Royal Fleet Auxiliary's Bay class landing ships in the interim.

In terms of smaller amphibious craft, in 2023 it was reported that the Royal Navy and Marines were seeking a replacement for the LCVP Mk 5 landing craft with the objective of securing service entry by 2027. The new Commando Insertion Craft were to have a low signature and be able to carry a strike team and small vehicle over a distance of 150 miles at a speed of 25 knots. A production contract had been envisaged by 2025 but as of 2026 was behind schedule. In June 2026, the Government announced that new high-speed "Joint Commando Craft" were to be acquired for the Royal Marines (in cooperation with Norway) together with "drone and autonomous technology".

=== Multi Role Ocean Surveillance ship ===
The 2021 defence white paper announced an intent to acquire a Multi-Role Ocean Surveillance ship (MROSS). The ship was planned to enter service in 2024 and was planned to be "fitted with advanced sensors and to carry a number of remotely operated and autonomous undersea drones to collect data to help protect our people and way of life with operations in UK and international waters". It was envisaged as necessary to protect undersea cable links to the UK.

In November 2022, the Ministry of Defence announced that the programme would be accelerated using funds gained through the cancellation of the National Flagship, a vessel which was to be used by the monarch and government officials to promote UK interests abroad. The MOD also confirmed that the first MROSS vessel would enter service with the Royal Fleet Auxiliary in 2023. In February 2023, the first vessel for this role - MV Topaz Tangaroa - was acquired. She was purchased for some 70 million pounds and converted to act as a mothership for autonomous systems and with military communications and light defensive armament added. She entered service as RFA Proteus in October 2023. A second MROS ship was originally envisaged though this idea was absent from the 2026 DIP which instead simply referred to the investment of £330m over four years on "critical underwater infrastructure protection, including through enhanced capabilities for RFA PROTEUS". The DIP also indicated that the Government would "explore where we can partner with industry to bring more funding into underwater cable protection". Previously, a second ship had been envisaged as likely needed to replace the current ocean survey ship, HMS Scott, which has been extended in service until 2033. However, the DIP only referenced the future replacement of the ice patrol ship HMS Protector and not HMS Scott.

=== Royal Fleet Auxiliary ships ===
The 2015 SDSR confirmed that three new large fleet solid support ships would be acquired for the Royal Fleet Auxiliary under the Fleet Solid Support Ship Programme to replace the single-hulled RFA Fort Victoria, which entered service in 1994, and RFA Fort Rosalie and RFA Fort Austin (both dating from the late 1970s). The ships were originally expected to enter service in the mid-2020s. The 2017 National Shipbuilding Strategy confirm this, noting that the Fleet Solid Support ships would be subjected to an international competition and be delivered by the mid-2020s.

However, late in 2019 this competition was stopped in the face of criticism that the competition permitted the potential construction of the ships outside the UK. The competition was anticipated as likely to be restarted with revised terms of reference. On 21 October 2020, it was indicated that the competition for the FSS will be restarted in Spring 2021, covering three ships and it will be an international competition but the team must be a led by a British company. The 2021 defence white paper confirmed that three FSSS would be built. In May 2021 the competition to build the ships was relaunched with the aim of taking a decision within two years. In July 2022, Rear-Admiral Paul Marshall, the Senior Responsible Officer for the Fleet Solid Support ship project, told the House of Commons Select Defence Committee that the first ship was envisaged for service entry in 2028 with the third entering service by 2032. However, subsequently the Ministry of Defence indicated that the first ship would in fact not be operational until 2031. In November 2022 it was announced that Team Resolute (BMT, Harland & Wolff and Navantia) had been selected to build the ships with the start of construction anticipated in 2025. The manufacturing contract, with a value of 1.6 billion pounds, was signed in January 2023.

== Submarines ==
=== Astute-class nuclear attack submarine ===
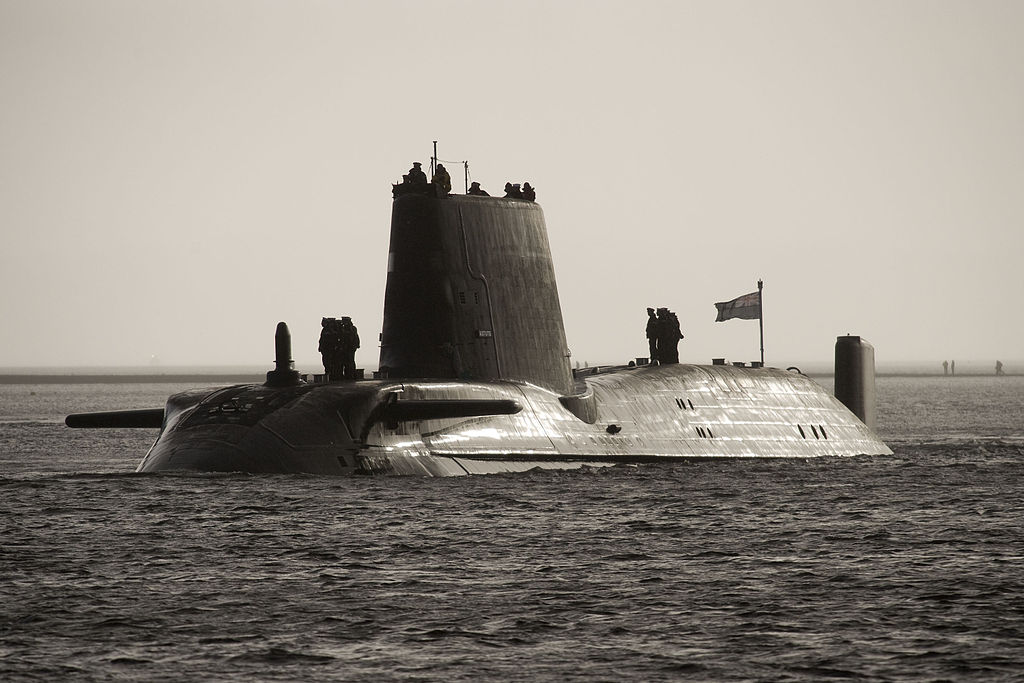
HMS Astute enters Faslane Naval Base

In 1997 the MOD signed a contract with GEC-Marconi (now BAE Systems Submarine Solutions) to deliver a new class of nuclear powered attack submarines to the Royal Navy. This class was intended to replace the five remaining boats of the ageing Swiftsure class, as well as the oldest two boats of the Trafalgar class. However delays led to the construction of only seven Astute-class, thereby replacing only the Trafalgar-class de facto. The first-in-class HMS Astute was laid down in January 2001 and commissioned into the fleet in August 2010, followed by her sisters HMS Ambush (2013), HMS Artful (2016), HMS Audacious (2020), HMS Anson (2022) and HMS Agamemnon (2025). As of September 2025, six of the boats have been commissioned and one remains under construction. The entry into service of the seventh boat had been planned for 2026, though it was subsequently reported that her in-service date had slipped to 2028 or early 2029.

The Astute-class are much larger than their predecessors and have greatly improved stealth, endurance and weapons load. Each submarine is capable of carrying up to 38 Tomahawk Land Attack Cruise Missiles and Spearfish heavyweight torpedoes.

=== Dreadnought-class nuclear ballistic missile submarine ===
In July 2016 it was confirmed that a new class of submarine would be built to replace the current fleet of 4 Vanguard-class ballistic missile submarines (SSBN) which carry the United Kingdom's nuclear deterrent. On 18 July 2016 the House of Commons voted 472 for and 117 against to proceed to build the new submarines. On 21 October 2016, the MoD announced that the first of the four planned boats would be named HMS Dreadnought, with the name also attached to the class. Construction of Dreadnought had commenced by 2017. On 6 December 2018, the second boat of this class was named as HMS Valiant. The final two boats of the class have been named HM Submarines Warspite and King George VI.

=== SSN-AUKUS ===
Prior to 2023, the plan for a Maritime Underwater Future Capability (MUFC), that is, a successor to the Astute-class SSN, was known the SSN (R) program. MUFC was also known as the 'Astute Replacement Nuclear Submarine (SSN (R))'. In September 2021, a £170 million contract was awarded to BAE Systems and Rolls-Royce for initial design work on the submarines.

In 2023, an agreement was reached by the American, British and Australian Governments to jointly develop a new attack submarine that is to be an evolution from SSN (R). The program will be a joint British-Australian-American project and will involve the construction of a new class of submarine for both the Royal Navy and the Royal Australian Navy. According to the Joint Leaders Statement, "Beginning in 2023, Australian military and civilian personnel will embed with the U.S. Navy, the Royal Navy, and in the United States and United Kingdom submarine industrial bases to accelerate the training of Australian personnel. The United States plans to increase SSN port visits to Australia beginning in 2023, with Australian sailors joining U.S. crews for training and development; the United Kingdom will increase visits to Australia beginning in 2026. ... In the late 2030s, the United Kingdom will deliver its first SSN-AUKUS to the Royal Navy. Australia will deliver the first SSN-AUKUS built in Australia to the Royal Australian Navy in the early 2040s". The program is to benefit from American technology transfers that will support the construction of the AUKUS submarines.

In June 2025, the newly elected Labour Government announced that it would aim to acquire up to 12 SSN-AUKUS vessels to replace the Astute-class, aiming to establish a construction "drum beat" in the 2040s/2050s that would see one new submarine enter service every 18 months. Some analysis suggested that in the absence of a significant expansion of U.K. submarine-building capacity, this objective was too optimistic and unlikely to be realized. In September 2026 the Government indicated that construction on the first vessel would begin in 2027, though a firm commitment to the construction of 12 boats was absent from the announcement. Service entry for the first boat was anticipated in the latter 2030s.

=== Uncrewed Submarines ===
The Fleet Experimentation Squadron, within the Disruptive Capabilities and Technologies Office, operates the vessels and systems related to the trialing of high technology military capabilities. In 2025, XV Excalibur, an Extra Large Uncrewed Underwater Vessel (XLUUV), was christened to develop the Navy's understanding of operating large uncrewed vessels underwater.

The 2026 DIP envisages the introduction into service of the Type 93 XLUUV. The class of vessel is to be designed to "work alongside crewed hunter-killer submarines to seek and destroy enemy submarines". Prototype XLUUVs were expected to be in service by 2030 with payloads developed through AUKUS.

== Aircraft ==
=== Fixed-wing aircraft ===
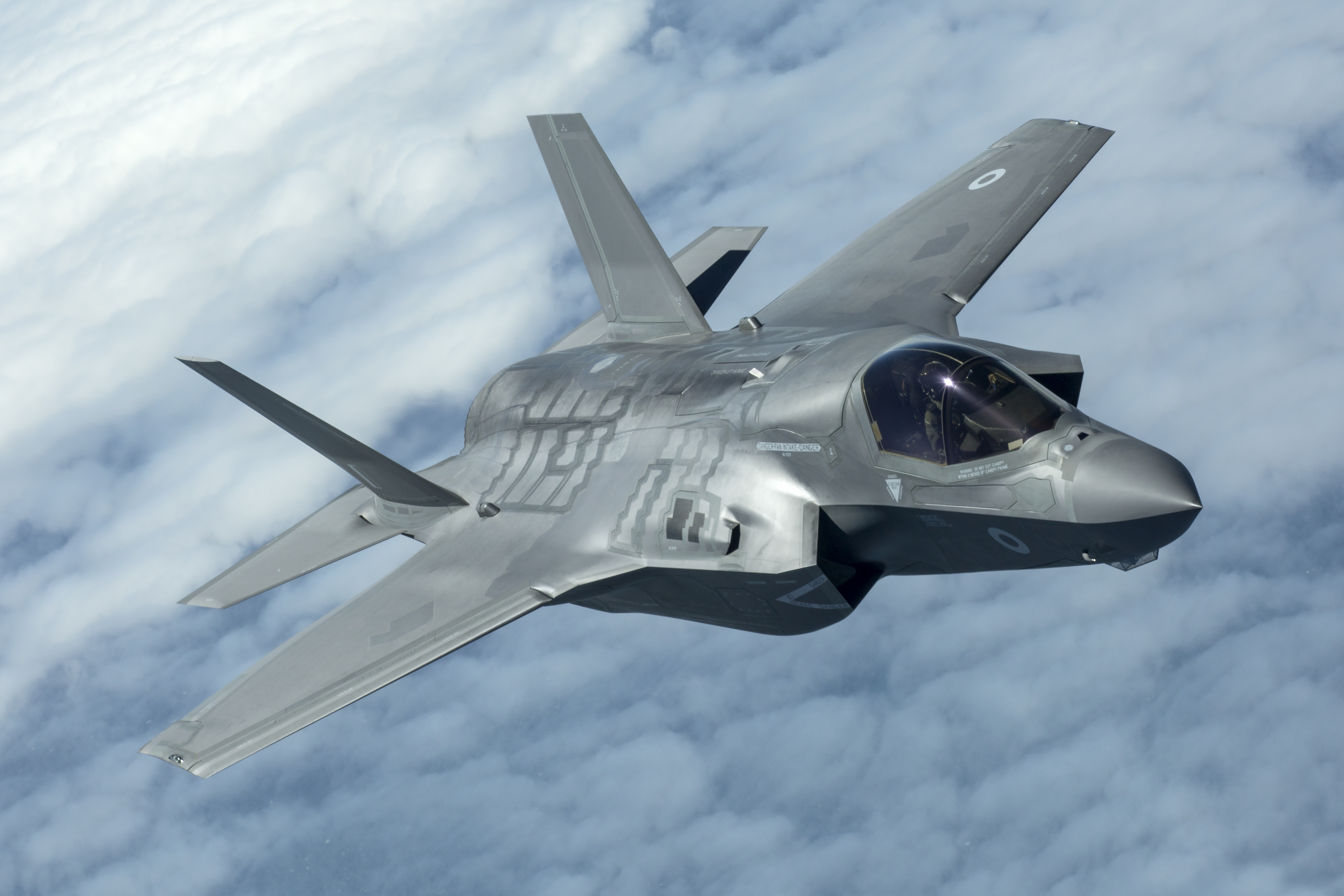
F-35 Lightning II

The Invincible class, because of its small size, had only a limited capacity and was only capable of operating STOVL aircraft, firstly the Sea Harrier and subsequently the Harrier GR7/GR9. In 2006 the Sea Harrier was withdrawn from service. This saw the front line Sea Harrier squadron of the Fleet Air Arm converting to the Harrier GR9, as part of the evolution of the Joint Force Harrier concept. The Harrier's replacement in both the RAF and the FAA is the American-designed and built F-35 Lightning II Joint Combat Aircraft. The F-35 is a significant improvement over the Harrier, in terms of speed, range and weapon load.

The UK had plans to order 138 F-35Bs for the FAA and RAF. The financial crisis led to the decision taken in the 2010 SDSR to immediately withdraw the Harrier GR9 force in late 2010 along with HMS Ark Royal, to reduce the total number of F-35s planned for purchase by the UK, and to purchase the F-35C CATOBAR version rather than the STOVL F-35B. By May 2012, the government had decided to purchase the more expensive and less-capable short-take off version, the F-35B instead.

In July 2012, the Secretary of State for Defence stated that an initial 48 F-35Bs will be purchased to equip the carrier fleet. In September 2013, it was announced that the second JSF squadron would be the Fleet Air Arm's 809 NAS. Then Chancellor of the Exchequer, George Osborne, announced on 22 November 2015 that the UK will have 24 F-35Bs on its two new carriers by 2023. While the 2015 SDSR declared that the United Kingdom would buy 138 F-35s over the life of the programme, the 2021 defence white paper sharply reduced that total to "beyond 48". Subsequently, the First Sea Lord indicated that the new envisaged number was to be 60 aircraft initially and "then maybe more", up to a maximum of around 80 to hopefully equip four "deployable squadrons". Overall, 47 Tranche 1 aircraft were in service as of March 2026.

On 20 May 2016, it had been reported that the UK would field four frontline squadrons as part of its Lightning Force; in addition to 809 NAS, plus another Fleet Air Arm squadron, four Royal Air Force units (617 Sqn plus another operational squadron, 207 Sqn as the OCU, and 17(R) Squadron as the Operational Evaluation Unit) were also formed. The UK is committed to improving its F-35Bs to Block 4 standard. In 2016 it had been planned that 809 NAS would stand up in April 2023. However, by 2021 it was no longer clear that this objective would be met and a specific date for 809 NAS to stand up had yet to be confirmed. In early 2022, one analysis suggested that 809 Squadron might not stand up before 2026 and that a third frontline F-35 squadron might not be active before 2030. In September 2022, it was reported that 809 Squadron would in fact formally stand up in 2023 but that it would not be considered "deployable" for a further two years thereafter. No. 809 Squadron formally stood-up in December 2023.

In 2022, U.K. Defence Secretary Ben Wallace reported that the RAF and Royal Navy faced a considerable challenge in providing even the existing modest F-35B fleet with qualified pilots. As of late 2022 there were only 30 qualified British pilots (plus three exchange pilots from the United States and Australia) for the F-35. The average wait time for RAF trainee Typhoon and F-35 pilots, after completing the Military Flying Training System, was approximately 11 and 12 months respectively. A further gap of 68 weeks existed between completing Basic Flying Training and beginning Advanced Fast Jet Training. The resulting pilot shortage was a factor in being able to stand up the first Fleet Air Arm Squadron (809 Squadron) on a timely basis. In February 2023, the Chief of the Air Staff, Air Chief Marshal Sir Mike Wigston, stated that the number of UK F-35 pilots had grown to 34, with a further 7 to complete training by August 2023. However, in 2025 the National Audit Office (NAO) reported that a consistent shortage of pilots remained, along with other shortages including of F-35 engineers.

In April 2022, the Deputy Chief of Defence Staff, Air Marshal Richard Knighton, told the House of Commons Defence Select Committee that the MoD was in discussions to purchase a second tranche of 26 F-35B fighters. Nevertheless, subsequent reports suggested that this second tranche order would only be completed in 2033. Plans for frontline F-35B squadrons had been modified and now envisaged a total of three squadrons (rather than four) each deploying 12-16 aircraft. In surge conditions 24 F-35s might be embarked on the carrier but a routine deployment would likely involve 12 aircraft.

At the 2025 NATO Summit at The Hague, Prime Minister Keir Starmer announced that the RAF would acquire twelve nuclear capable F-35A fighter jets. It is planned that the U.K's pending Tranche 2 order for F-35 aircraft will now comprise another 15 F-35Bs (in addition to 47 already in service) and 12 non-carrier capable F-35As. While not impacting the planned overall numbers of F-35 aircraft in the RAF/Fleet Air Arm inventory, the switch away from an exclusive F-35B fleet will, to some extent, reduce overall numbers of fighter aircraft available for carrier operations. The 2026 defence investment plan did not confirm the order or specific timing for 15 additional F-35B aircraft, though it noted that 12 F-35A aircraft would likely be ordered for delivery in the early 2030s.

=== Helicopters ===
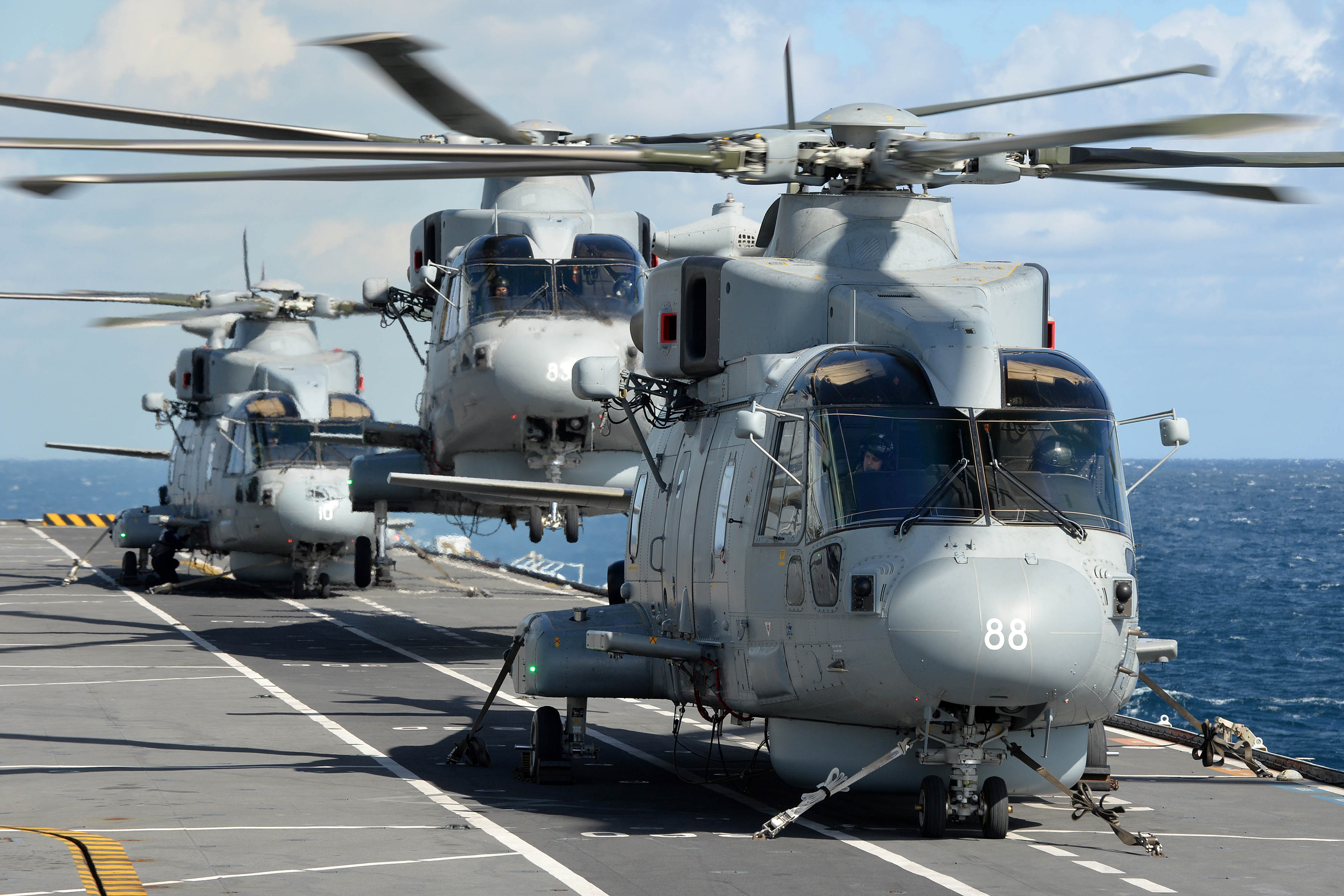
Merlin HM2's operating on HMS Illustrious

The 2010 Strategic Defence and Security Review saw the Fleet Air Arm transition to operate two types of helicopter – the AW101 Merlin and the AW159 Wildcat. These replaced the aging fleet of Westland Sea Kings and Westland Lynxes. There are 30 Merlin HM.2 helicopters in service.

An AEW capability based on the "Crowsnest" programme and mounted on Merlin helicopters replaced the previous Sea King ASaC.7 which retired in September 2018. All 30 of the Royal Navy's HM.2 Merlins are equipped to carry the Crowsnest system, though a maximum of 10 could be fitted with it at any one time. Despite the original intent to have up to 10 Merlin helicopters deploy the Crowsnest system, it has been reported that initially only five Merlins will be equipped with Crowsnest, three of these being normally assigned to the "high readiness" aircraft carrier.

Problems with Merlin/Crowsnest have caused the Royal Navy to look for a replacement. As of 2023 the system had a planned retirement date of 2029. In 2021, the UK's Defence and Security Accelerator (DASA) announced that options would be examined and might draw on the already existing Project Vixen (see below), researching the utility of a naval unmanned system that could encompass strike, airborne surveillance, air-to-air refueling and electronic warfare. If implemented, the replacement of Merlin/Crowsnest by another system would permit all Merlin helicopters to focus on ASW operations for the remainder of their service lives.

As of 2020, the out of service date for the HM.2s was envisaged as 2029 while the HC.4s were scheduled to retire by 2030. The 2021 defence white paper did not reference a Merlin replacement. However, it was subsequently indicated that the out of service date for both the HM.2s and the HC.4s had been extended to 2040.

The 2026 DIP envisages widespread acquisition of autonomous systems in order to replace many existing capabilities in the Fleet Air Arm. However, timelines are unclear. The HMA2 maritime variant of the Wildcat helicopter is projected to be replaced by unspecified drones between 2030 and 2035. At the same time the Army/Royal Marine reconnaissance AH1 variant of the same helicopter, used by 847 Naval Air Squadron, are projected to be retired from 2027 with no confirmed timeline for their replacement by autonomous systems.

=== Remote Piloted Air Systems ===
Future autonomous helicopters may be based on the prototype developed under Project Proteus. The DIP noted that "Proteus has demonstrated the potential of large uncrewed air systems operating alongside crewed aircraft in future hybrid air wings to play a key role in anti-submarine operations under the Atlantic Bastion concept".

The Royal Navy has trialed a range of other remotely piloted systems in recent years and some are likely to be integrated into plans for the "future hybrid air wings". About £240m is to be invested in Project PANTHEON, the development of autonomous systems as part of the Hybrid Carrier Air Wing. "Early" trials are anticipated for jet-powered drones to operate alongside the F-35B force under Project VANQUISH.

In early 2023, the Schiebel S-100 Camcopter was selected to operate in an intelligence-gathering, surveillance and reconnaissance role with the Royal Navy. Named Peregrine in Royal Navy service, it began trials on the frigate HMS Lancaster in the Persian Gulf, in mid-2024.

The Royal Navy has also utilised 3D-printed unmanned aircraft in its operations.

The Royal Navy has planned for two future UAS: The Flexible Deployable UAS (FDUAS) and Joint Mini UAS (JMUAS) programs. FDUAS is seen as a "Sea Eagle (Scan Eagle) Plus" while JMUAS is a UAS for the Royal Marines. In November 2019, 700 NAS tested two new UAS, namely, the AeroVironment RQ-20 Puma and the AeroVironment Wasp III.

In 2020 NavyX tested a heavy quadcopter from Malloy Aeronautics, with the head engineer of Malloy stating that the aspiration was to autonomously deploy 180 kg payloads from a Royal Navy vessel over ranges of 20 km with their T400 quadcopter. Payloads could include people, torpedoes and fixed-wing drones.

In March 2021, Project Vixen was revealed to the public as a programme to examine the use of fixed-wing UAVs from the Queen Elizabeth-class aircraft carriers in roles such as surveillance, strike, electronic warfare and air-to-air refueling. During the same month, it was also revealed that the MOD was seeking electromagnetic catapults and arrestor cables capable of launching large fixed-wing UAVs from the aircraft carriers within three–five years.

During the WESTLANT 23 deployment to the US, HMS Prince of Wales is planned to trial the General Atomics Mojave, a short take-off and landing (STOL) medium-altitude long-endurance (MALE) drone to examine the feasibility of operating large fixed-wing drones for armed surveillance and other roles from carriers. Before leaving European waters, Prince of Wales conducted STOL trials with a WAS HCMC twin-engine heavy-lift RPAS to embark a dummy payload of naval memorabilia before returning to the UK with a fuel sample for laboratory testing, demonstrating the first steps in obtaining fixed-wing cargo capability for the Queen Elizabeth-class carriers.

== Royal Marines ==
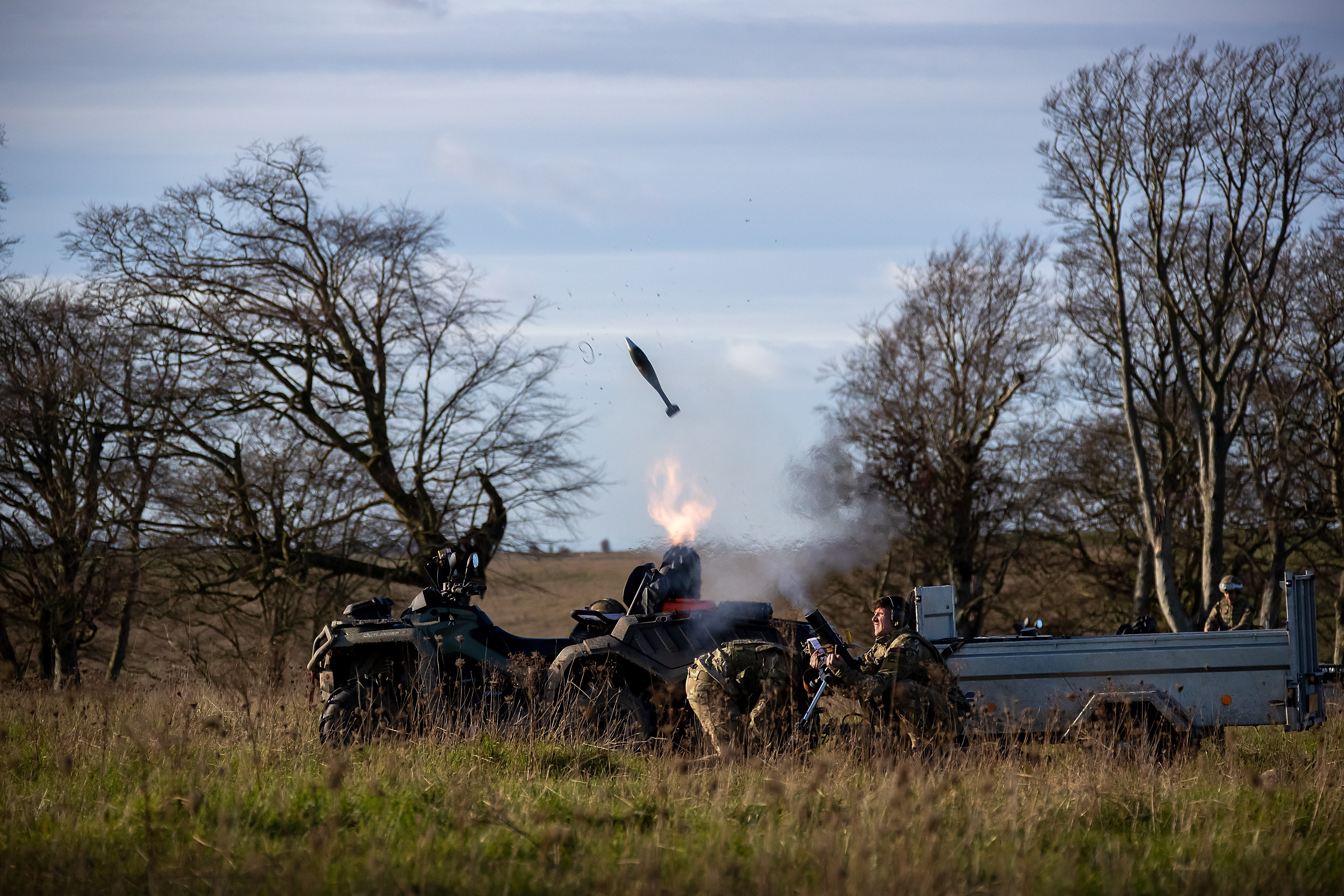
RM trialling mortars on Can-Am Outlander quad bike in 2020

The Royal Marines have been downsized and restructured in recent years, while the Navy's Albion-class assault ships were withdrawn from service in 2024/25 significantly impacting the U.K.'s power projection capabilities.

Under the terms of the 2026 DIP, £100m of new investment was pledged in order to "progress the transformation of the UK Commando Force into a Warfighting Formation focused on the High North because of its growing importance. Plans include the replacement of the Viking amphibious vehicles with a Future All Terrain Vehicle. Sixty vehicles are envisaged by March 2028.

However, beyond that, analysis suggests that it remains uncertain whether the U.K. will have sufficient specialized amphibious capability in the future to generate adequate forces for projecting power ashore in either high or medium threat scenarios. Objectives have stressed the need to form Littoral Response Groups (LRGs) able to provide "scalable capabilities" in different threat environments. The ability to do so will be dependent on both the numbers of future transport vessels (future Dutch-led Amphibious Transport Ship Programme) acquired and on their carrying capacity. The same is true for the future "Joint Commando Craft", which under terms of the DIP are to be acquired in cooperation with Norway.

== Weapons ==
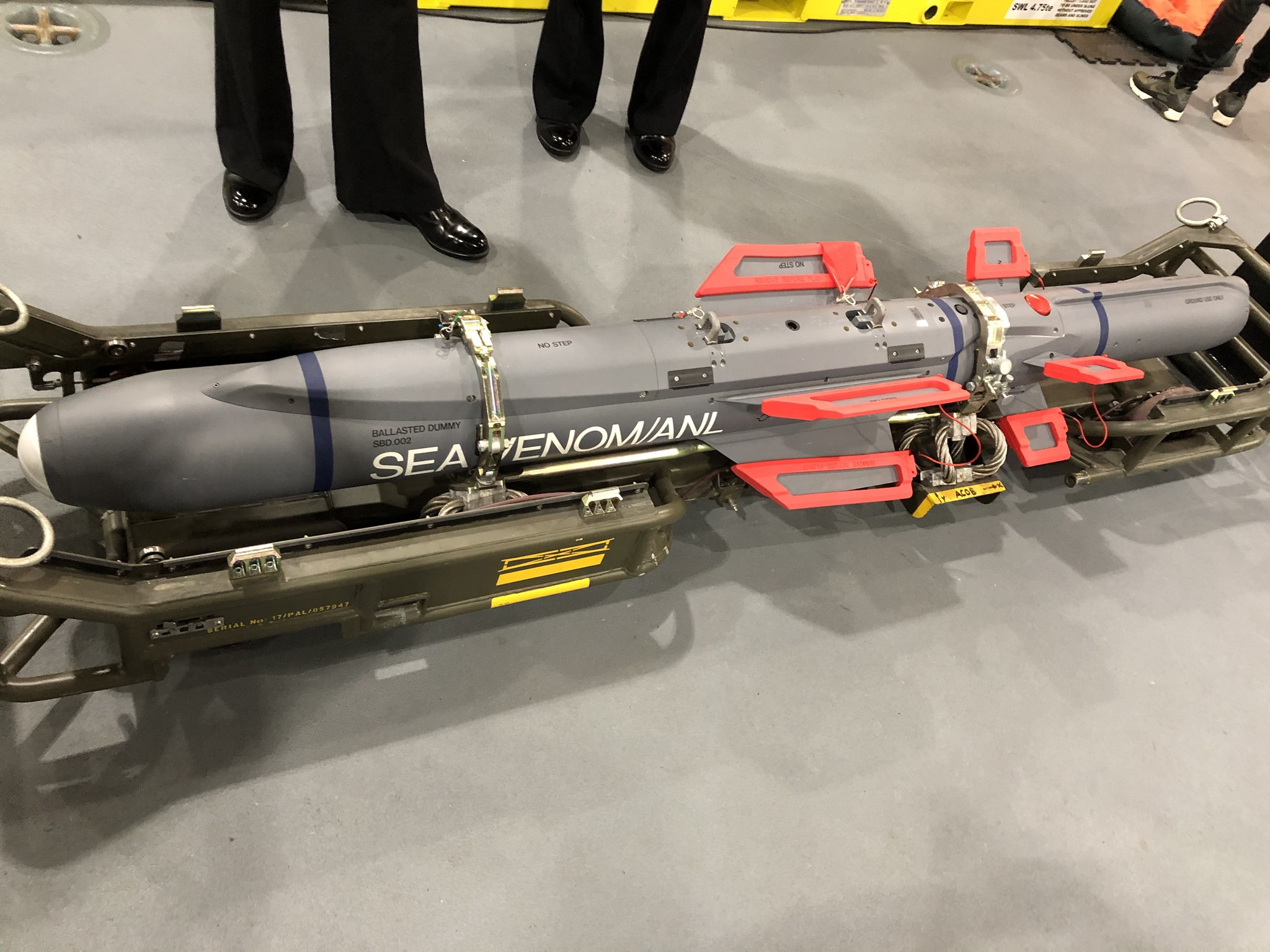
A dummy Sea Venom anti-ship missile on board HMS Prince of Wales (R09).

- Sea Ceptor (formerly CAMM(M) or FLAADS) is a short-range air-defence missile that has replaced the former Sea Wolf missile system on Type 23 frigates and is to be incrementally added to the armament of the Type 45 destroyers from 2026.
- Sea Viper, used by the Type 45 destroyers, has undergone trials using its SAMPSON radar to track ballistic missiles, and work is ongoing to develop its Aster missiles to counter ballistic missiles. The UK is also considering upgrading its Type 45 Destroyers with the Aster 30 Block 1NT missile.
- Sea Venom (formerly FASGW (Heavy)), a bigger anti-shipping missile launched from helicopters, replacing former Sea Skua missile which was withdrawn from service in 2017. Initially reported deployed with helicopters of the Royal Navy's carrier strike group in 2021. However, operating challenges were reported in 2023 as "ongoing" and full operating capability for Sea Venom was delayed until 2026. Initial operating capability with the Royal Navy was declared in October 2025.
- The SPEAR 3 missile is a multi-role networked anti-ship and land-attack missile based on the Brimstone anti-tank missile with the JSOW-ER turbojet to extend the range to over 120 km. Four Spear 3 can fit in two internal weapons bay of an F-35B, MBDA are also looking at ship launch for members of the Brimstone family, including a quick-firing, anti-swarm 'Sea Spear'. In November 2021, Defence Procurement Minister Jeremy Quin suggested that full operating capability for SPEAR-3 on F-35 might occur in around 2028. However, in conjunction with the first test flight of Spear 3 on the F-35B in May 2026, it was indicated that likely service entry for the missile would be in the "early 2030s". In the interim, it was planned to acquire the GBU-53/B StormBreaker, or SDB II, to fill the resulting gap.
- Stratus (Future Cruise/Anti Ship Weapon) is a future anti-ship cruise missile planned for the Royal Navy and the French Navy. MBDA has presented Perseus, a supersonic multi-role cruise missile concept study which was unveiled at the Paris 2011 Air Show. In the 2016 UK-France Security Summit, the two parties pledged to work on a "joint concept phase for the Future Cruise/Anti-Ship Weapon (FC/ASW) programme to identify solutions for replacement of the Scalp/Storm Shadow missiles, for both countries, Harpoon for the UK and Exocet for France." In 2021, Jeremy Quin indicated that the plan was to equip the Type 26-class frigates with the missile from 2028. In October 2021 it was reported that the project had been put "on hold", at least temporarily, by France in response to the UK role in Australia's decision to cancel the acquisition of French-designed conventional submarines. Then in November the First Sea Lord, Admiral Tony Radakin, told the House of Commons Select Defence Committee that options for FC/ASW were still "being looked at" including potential hypersonic weapons. This might in fact delay the introduction of these weapons until the 2030s. An "early 2030s" date was confirmed in July 2026.
- A prior information notice (PIN) for contracts was announced on 5 March 2019 for a Next Generation Interim Surface Ship Guided Weapon (I-SSGW), that is, an anti-ship missile to replace the Royal Navy's Harpoon Block 1C missiles on five of the Type-23-class frigates. The possible candidates for the requirement were the Harpoon Block II+, LRASM, Naval Strike Missile, RBS15 Mk4, Exocet Block 3C, Gabriel V missile, C-star, Type 90 Ship-to-Ship Missile or Hsiung Feng III. A contract notice was issued on 22 August 2019 for an "Interim Surface to Surface Guided Weapon System (I-SSGW)", requesting for an over-the-horizon anti ship capability and a terrain-following precision land attack capability. The land attack requirement had been likely to disqualify the Harpoon, Exocet and C-Star from the competition. However, in November 2021 the First Sea Lord, Admiral Tony Radakin, told the House of Commons Select Defence Committee that the program "had been paused" and seemed likely to be cancelled. The project was confirmed to have been cancelled in February 2022. Even so, in July 2022 Defence Secretary Ben Wallace indicated that the project might be resurrected yet again. In November 2022, the Naval Strike Missile was purchased to be fitted to 11 Type 45 destroyers and Type 23 frigates. Initial delivery of the first systems was anticipated by the end of 2023. In December 2023, HMS Somerset became the first Royal Navy warship to be equipped with the missile.
- The British Government announced on 5 January 2017 that it had awarded a £30 million contract to UK consortium 'Dragonfire' to develop a directed energy weapon technology demonstrator. Their intention is to have a working prototype ready by the end of the decade and potentially have vessels equipped with directed energy weapons by the mid-2020s. In July 2022, the system began a series of trials to prove the accuracy and power of the weapon. In April 2024, Defence Secretary Grant Shapps stated that the U.K. aimed to deploy Dragonfire on Royal Navy warships by 2027 - five years earlier than previously planned.
- In July 2019, the UK issued a Prior Information Notice for Directed Energy Weapon (DEW) demonstrators. This differs from the above Dragonfire as it combines multiple laser beams to produce a weapon more powerful than its predecessors and resistant to the most challenging environmental conditions.

== Navigation and communication ==
- In January 2016, it was announced that a £44m Navigation Radar Programme would see "more than 60 Royal Navy ships, submarines and shore facilities" fitted with state-of-the-art navigation radars, with contracts awarded to Lockheed Martin Integrated Systems UK and Kelvin Hughes.
- The MoD is reportedly investing heavily in development of quantum compasses which could potentially transcend the need for GPS as a means of navigation, providing a self-contained and interference-proof alternative. Deployment of this technology is often discussed with regard to the Royal Navy's submarine fleet, allowing vessels to navigate without outside assistance and therefore remain submerged for extended lengths of time.
- In December 2018, it was announced that a £23m agreement to provide Royal Navy and Royal Fleet Auxiliary ships with new radios had been signed. The radios will be installed on 39 ships in total, including 13 Type 23 Frigates, 4 survey and ice patrol vessels, 13 minehunters and 9 RFA supply ships and will be used to communicate with other ships, ports and aircraft during operations. They will replace numerous older radios and as more modern pieces of equipment, they are easier to use/maintain, can be updated via software and operated remotely. Under the contract, Thales will develop, fit and support a V/UHF radio solution which includes the acquisition of around 300 Rohde & Schwarz radios. The first radio will enter service on a Type 23 Frigate in 2020, with all radios due to be delivered and installed by the end of 2023.

== See also ==
- List of active Royal Navy ships
- Future of the Royal Air Force
- Army 2020 Refine
- Future of the United States Navy
- Future of the Royal Australian Navy
- Future of the Brazilian Navy
- Future of the French Navy
- Future of the Indian Navy
- Future of the Royal Netherlands Navy
- Future of the Russian Navy
- List of future Spanish Navy ships
