= HMS Active =

Twelve ships of the Royal Navy have been named HMS Active or HMS Actif, with a thirteenth currently under construction:

- HMS Active (1758) was a 28-gun sixth rate launched in 1758 and captured in 1778 by two French frigates off San Domingo.
- HMS Active (1776) was a 14-gun brig-sloop launched in 1776 and captured in 1780 by the American privateer General Pickering off New York.
- HMS Active (1779) was a 12-gun cutter that entered service in 1779 and surrendered that same year to the French cutter Mutin when Active encountered and was unable to escape the combined Franco-Spanish fleet in the English Channel. The French took her into service as Actif and later Activ No.1 (1782). She was paid off at Brest in December 1782 and broken up there early the next year.
- HMS Active (1780) was a 32-gun fifth rate launched in 1780 and wrecked in 1796 on Anticosti Island at the mouth of the Saint Lawrence River.
- HMS Active (1782) was a 14-gun brig-sloop listed in 1782.
- HMS Actif (1794) was a 16-gun privateer that Iphigenia captured from the French on 16 March 1794; she foundered on 26 November, although all her crew were saved.
- HMS Active (1799) was a 38-gun fifth rate launched in 1799. She was placed on harbour service in 1826, renamed HMS Argo in 1833, and was broken up in 1860.
- HMS Active (1845) was a 36-gun fifth rate launched in 1845, becoming a training ship and being renamed HMS Tyne in 1867 and HMS Durham in 1867. She was sold in 1908.
- HMS Active (1869) was a Volage-class iron screw corvette launched in 1869 and sold in 1906.
- HMS Active (1911) was an Active-class scout cruiser launched in 1911 and scrapped in 1920.
- HMS Active (H14) was an A-class destroyer launched in 1928 and broken up in 1947.
- HMS Active (F171) was a Type 21 frigate launched in 1972. She was sold to the Pakistan Navy in 1994 and was renamed Shah Jahan.
- HMS Active (Type 31 frigate) is a Type 31 frigate that is currently under construction.

== Battle honours ==
Ships named Active have earned the following battle honours:

- Lagos, 1759
- Trincomalee, 1782
- Camperdown, 1797
- Egypt, 1801
- Lissa, 1811
- Pelagosa, 1811
- Ashantee, 1873−74
- Jutland, 1916
- Atlantic, 1939−44
- Bismarck, 1941
- Diego Suarez, 1942
- Arctic, 1944
- Falkland Islands, 1982

== See also ==
- Hired armed cutter Active
- The schooner Active, which was under the command of Lieutenant Michael Fitton, was a tender to the flagship on the Jamaica station. She assisted Nereide at the capitulation of Curaçao on 13 September 1800.
