= HMS Venturer =

Seven ships of the Royal Navy have been named HMS Venturer, with an eighth announced:

- HMS Venturer was a 14-gun cutter purchased in 1787 and named HMS Ranger (1787). She was captured by the French in 1794, recaptured in 1797, then briefly retaken but finally recaptured. She was recommissioned as HMS Venturer and was sold in 1803.
- HMS Venturer (1807) was a 10-gun schooner, previously the French privateer Nouvelle Enterprise. HMS Nimrod captured her in 1807. She was renamed HMS Theodocia in 1808 and sold in 1814. She then became the mercantile Theodosia. She traded with Rid de Janeiro and was last listed in 1822.
- HMS Venturer (P68) was a V-class submarine launched in 1943 and sold to the Norwegian Navy in 1946. She was renamed HNoMS Utstein and was scrapped in 1964.
- HMS Venturer has been a name allocated to three tenders of HMS Flying Fox, the Bristol Royal Naval Volunteer Reserve Division:
  - Motor minesweeper 261 was HMS Venturer between 1948 and 1956
  - HMS Buttington (M1117) was HMS Venturer in 1962
  - HMS Hodgeston (M1146) was HMS Venturer between 1961 and 1975
- HMS Venturer (M08) was a converted minesweeper launched in 1972 as the commercial trawler Suffolk Harvester. She was converted and commissioned into the Severn RNR in 1978 and was returned to her original owner in 1983. She was converted into an oil rig safety/standby vessel.
- HMS Venturer will be a Type 31 frigate.

== See also ==
- HMS Venturous
