= Stratus (missile family) =

Anglo-French missile programme

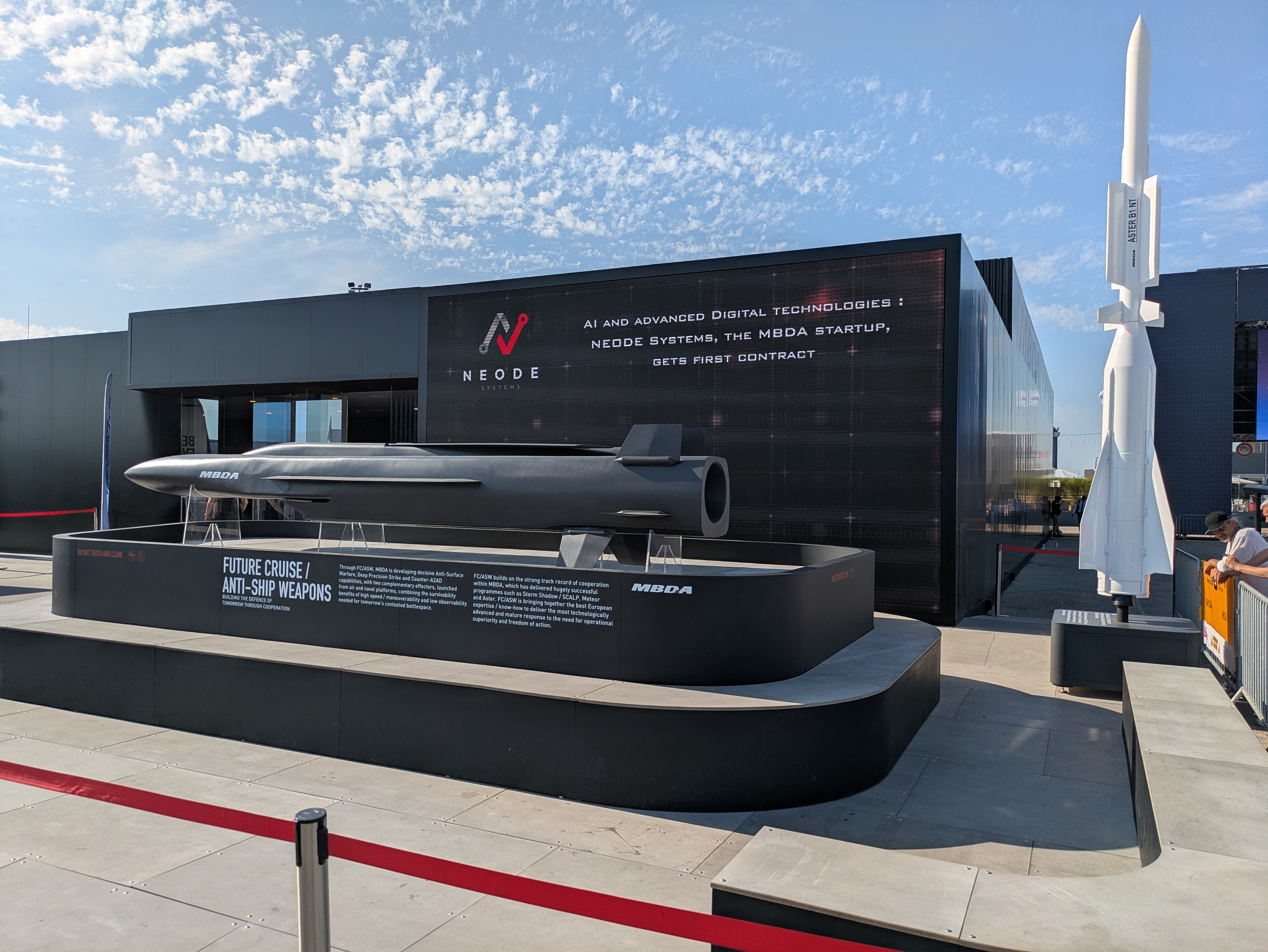
- Type: Stratus LO (Low Observability) stealthy subsonic missile: land attack cruise missile; anti-ship cruise missile; Stratus RS (Rapid Strike) supersonic highly manoeuverable missile: land attack cruise missile; anti-ship cruise missile; SEAD / DEAD missile; Anti-high value air asset (AEW&C / tanker)
- Place of origin: France; Italy; United Kingdom

Service history
- In service: Expected "early 2030s"
- Used by: French Air Force; French Navy; Italian Air Force; Italian Navy; Royal Air Force; Royal Navy

Production history
- Designer: MBDA
- Variants: See Variants

Specifications
- Launch platform: FREMM; Type 26; Eurofighter Typhoon; Dassault Rafale

Stratus, formerly known as the Future Cruise/Anti-Ship Weapon (FC/ASW) or FMAN/FMC in French (Futur Missile Anti-Navire/Futur Missile de Croisière), is a multi-national next generation missile programme launched by France and the United Kingdom in 2017 to succeed their jointly-developed Storm Shadow/SCALP as well as their respective Exocet and Harpoon anti-ship missiles, with Italy in the process of joining as of June 2023. The programme has previously been referred to as the Future Offensive Surface Weapon (FOSW) by the Royal Navy and SPEAR 5 by the Royal Air Force. The Stratus family comprises two missiles, Stratus LO (Low Observable) and Stratus RS (Rapid Strike).

In 2017, an agreement for the launch of a concept phase was signed between the two initial partners and, in March 2019, MBDA announced the key review of the programme was successfully completed in cooperation with the French Directorate General of Armament (DGA) and the British Defence Equipment and Support (DE&S).

On 18 February 2022, an agreement and associated contracts signed by the head of the DGA, his British counterpart and the CEO of MBDA confirmed the launch of the preparation works for the FC/ASW. By 2022, the programme was examining two different missile concepts; with the discontinuation of a hypersonic solution similar to the CVS401 Perseus which was an early hypersonic missile concept study from MBDA with input from both France and the UK. By 2024, these two concepts had evolved into two distinct but complementary weapon systems; a low observable subsonic cruise missile and a supersonic highly manoeuvrable missile.

Equally funded by both the UK and France with the workload evenly split, the project is led by MBDA and is a product of the close defence relationship set out between the two nations by the Lancaster House treaties. In June 2023, it was announced Italy would join the programme; a restructuring of the workshare to reflect this new development is expected to take place.

A contract award for Stratus-RS is expected in early November, whilst a full contract award for Stratus-LO is expected between late 2026 and early 2027.

== Origins ==
=== Early concept study (CVS401 Perseus) ===
An artist's depiction of the Perseus hypersonic multi-role cruise missile concept. Note the two submunitions which have been released from the lateral bays of the parent missile.

Unveiled in 2011 at the Salon du Bourget in Paris, Perseus or CVS401 Perseus (named after the Greek hero Perseus) was a concept study undertaken by MBDA for a stealth hypersonic cruise missile designed in consultation with the Marine Nationale and Royal Navy; a team of ten engineers worked on the design for six months.

The Perseus was to be approximately five metres (16 ft) in length, had a weight of around 800 kilograms (1,800 lb) and be powered by a ramjet motor. The payload consisted of one 200-kilogram (440 lb) main and two 50-kilogram (110 lb) subsidiary warheads which could either directly contribute to the overall impact or be ejected from lateral bays before the missile reaches its target, in effect acting as submunitions. This unique feature would allow a single Perseus to either strike several targets in the same general area or to strike a single large target (such as an aircraft carrier) in several different areas simultaneously, with the aim of maximising damage. "In this case, a linear attack pattern could be selected, munitions striking the forward, centre and aft sections simultaneously. If a unitary blast is required, then the effectors remain on board the parent missile to add their blast effect to the central warhead."

Two types of attack profiles were envisaged: a high-altitude approach, for engaging land-based targets; and a sea-skimming low-altitude approach terminating in a 'pop-up' engagement when dealing with surface threats like enemy warships. The missiles "skimming the sea at wave top" followed by a pop-up manoeuvre would only allow an estimated 3 second response time for enemy warships.

The conceptualised sensor suite consisted of a multi-mode active e-scan radar with synthetic aperture radar and doppler beam sharpening, a laser radar (lidar) for terminal phase imaging and target recognition, and finally a "semi-active laser guidance capability, which MBDA believes will remain important for time-sensitive targeting for many years to come. Additionally, satellite datalink is to be incorporated for in-flight re-targeting using thin-profile, low-observable active antenna arrays.

MBDA animations showed Perseus to be vertically launched from surface warships as well as from the torpedo tubes of submerged attack submarines.

=== Programme start ===
A preliminary study was carried out between 2011 and 2014. It assessed the degree of convergence in the definition of the French and British Armed Forces's operational needs. At the 2016 UK–France Security Summit, the two parties pledged to work on a "joint concept phase for the FC/ASW programme" to cooperate and identify solutions for replacement of both nations' jointly-developed SCALP-EG/Storm Shadow cruise missiles, as well as their respective heavyweight anti-ship missiles: the Harpoon and Exocet; leveraging the agreements set out in the 2010 Lancaster House Treaties At the 2018 United Kingdom-France Summit, the FC/ASW programme was further affirmed.

On 11 July 2018, a joint-inquiry between the French National Défense and Armed Forces Commission and the British House of Commons Defence Select Committee was sat to discuss the FC/ASW program one year into its concept phase. In response to whether part of the system would take on similar roles to that of the Royal Navy's submarine-launched Tomahawk land-attack cruise missile, Lt General Sir Mark Poffley said that "Certainly we would anticipate the sorts of roles that Tomahawk is providing at the moment being catered for inside the requirement here". Additionally, it was confirmed that program would at the very least produce two variants, one air-launched and another surface-launched and that options were being explored as to whether a single missile type or a family of missiles would be required to fulfil both parties' anti-ship and deep-strike requirements. Sir Mark also stated that a submarine-launched capability was not directly being explored at this time but that "there will undoubtedly be potentially some read-across of some of the work done in this programme to other missile systems". Additionally, Sir Simon Bollom of DE&S, clarified that the UK desired to integrate the resulting air-launched product on to the F-35B in the long-term.

In July 2021, then UK Secretary of State for Defence Jeremy Quin, responded to a question on the in-service date for FC/ASW, stating: "The planning assumption for service entry for Future Cruise/Anti-Ship Weapon on the Type 26 Frigate and Typhoon aircraft is 2028 and 2030 respectively". This date was pushed back to the "early 2030s" in July 2026.

==== I-SSGW ====
As FC/ASW could not deliver a weapon before 2020, the then retirement date for the UK's Harpoon stockpile, in 2019 the UK began the £200 million Interim Surface to Surface Guided Weapon (I-SSGW) programme to procure replacement missiles that would provide both anti-ship and land-attack capability (the latter of which was not a capability present in the Harpoon) in the interim until FC/ASW yielded a more capable replacement around 2030. To facilitate the selection and procurement of I-SSGW, Harpoon's out-of-service-date would be pushed back to 2023.

In November 2021, it was announced that the I-SSGW programme had been cancelled. First Sea Lord Admiral Tony Radakin explained to the House of Commons Defence Select Committee that the I-SSGW was seen as a "sticking-plaster approach" delivering only a "modest" capability for a short-period of time that would quickly be replaced by the more capable FC/ASW solution and that instead it would be more beneficial to just invest entirely in the FC/ASW programme. This decision would have left the UK without any heavyweight surface-launched anti-shipping capability for most of the 2020s after Harpoon retires and before FC/ASW enters service and was therefore controversial.

On 5 July 2022, during another Commons Defence Select Committee session, it was announced that the I-SSGW programme had restarted, possibly in response to the Russian invasion of Ukraine in February 2022. On 23 November 2022, in was announced that the Norwegian Naval Strike Missile (NSM) had been selected for the I-SSGW requirement with eleven sets purchased to equip the Type 23 frigates and Type 45 destroyers with the possibility of migrating some of the sets to the Type 26 or particularly the Type 31 frigates in the future. Under the newly named Maritime Offensive Surface Strike programme (MOSS), NSM had its initial operating capability declared on 19 December 2023 a week after the first set was successfully installed on HMS Somerset. However, following a series of defects and current lack of availability as of February 2024, HMS Somerset has yet to conduct a live-firing of NSM and has effectively seen a delay placed on the Royal Navy's escort fleet regaining a key surface warfare capability.

==== AUKUS backlash ====
In September 2021 the signing of a Memorandum of Understanding to progress the project was postponed by France in response to the AUKUS security pact which saw Australia cancel the acquisition of French-designed conventional submarines (Attack-class) in favour of nuclear submarines based on technology from United States and United Kingdom (SSN-AUKUS).

== Development ==
=== Concept phase ===
In February 2022, a government to government agreement and associated contracts were signed by the two nations. This also came with the announcement that the programme had formally begun assessing two complementary concepts for the missile's design: a subsonic low observable missile and a supersonic missile with high manoeuvrability. It had been known that the program had already been examining supersonic and subsonic designs for the program prior to this. This announcement also appeared to confirm the programme had discounted the development of a hypersonic missile akin to the conceptualised Perseus, instead choosing to invest further into subsonic/supersonic missile designs. Indications for a two-missile solution for the programme had been publicly displayed almost a year prior at DSEI 2021; then previously described as subsonic and hypersonic solutions, it was reported by Naval News that the British were favouring the subsonic munition whilst the French were favouring the hypersonic option.

On 22 July 2022, Naval News reported that the UK's Rolls-Royce and France's Safran had jointly signed an assessment phase contract with MBDA to collaborate in producing the propulsion systems for the FC/ASW program, predominantly around the subsonic missile design.

=== Italian membership ===
On 20 June 2023, during the Paris Air Show, Italy signed a letter of intent to join the French and British on the FC/ASW programme, likely as a means of fielding future replacements both for Italy's Storm Shadow/SCALP stockpiles and for its indigenous Teseo anti-ship missiles. This also came with an announcement that FC/ASW was expected to leave the concept phase and launch the primary design phase starting in 2024 with the finished product(s) entering service around 2028–2030.

On 17 November 2023, Shepard News reported that Italy had confirmed its initial funding of €10 million out of €150 million for the development of FC/ASW between 2023 and 2028.

On 13 March 2024, during an annual review press conference, MBDA's CEO, Eric Béranger, explained that France and the UK were still in discussions regarding the adjusted workshare following Italy's letter of intent.

=== Early design characteristics ===
The Italian funding announcement on 17 November 2023 also came with another timeline update stating that a deep-strike, land-attack variant would be delivered in 2028 and an anti-ship variant delivered in 2034, confirming that the programme would now produce two role-specific missile variants of unspecified designs.

Despite the earlier announcement in 2022 of complementary subsonic and supersonic concepts, there was still confusion as to whether this was in fact confirmation of the programme actually producing two missiles or merely examining which of the two concepts best fit the requirements of all parties (potentially with some parties choosing to field one concept over the other). Some commentators such as Navy Lookout still continued to report at the time that a single weapon (including a hypersonic solution) was being sought. Others outlets such as Naval News saw it likely that a family of weapons were under development and that a predominantly French-designed supersonic missile and a predominantly British-designed subsonic missile would be fielded together as two distinct but complementary weapons. Others still were curious as to how the programme would meet the diverse surface-launched requirements of all parties, with the British seemingly requiring a vertically launched solution whilst the French and Italian navies with fewer strike-length vertical launch cells available likely requiring a canister-launched capability. It was still not known if the program was eventually to develop a missile also capable of being launched from submarines to replace existing submarine-launched missile variants such as the Exocet SM39 and MdCN.

In January 2024, in response to a written question from the Shadow Secretary of Defence John Healey on the in-service date of the air-launched variant, The Minister of State for Defence James Cartlidge said that "The planning assumption for service entry for the maritime-launched Future Cruise / Anti-Ship Weapon is 2028; a decision around which options, including off the shelf choices, should fulfil this requirement is ongoing, and will be confirmed in due course in the Full Business Case". On 14 May 2024, during the First Sea Lord's Sea Power Conference, Admiral Ben Key told journalists that three missile options were being explored as part of plans to equip the Type 26 and Type 31 frigates with land-attack missiles: Tomahawk, NSM, and FC/ASW, with the former two options aligning with the "off the shelf" comments from James Cartlidge months earlier.

On 15 May 2024, in response to a programme update from former Secretary of State for Defence Ben Wallace, James Cartlidge confirmed that "Significant progress has been made on suitable candidate weapon systems to fulfil the Naval and Air requirements" and that the programme was currently focused on "reducing schedule risk, prior to the potential Demonstration and Manufacturing phases, and preparations are underway to prepare towards Full Business Case". He also confirmed that Italy had still yet to be brought into the programme.

In November 2024, at the Euronaval defence exhibition in Paris, MBDA revealed that the development of two prototype missile designs had been progressing over the last twelve months; thus confirming the earlier reports of two distinct but complementary solutions for the programme:

- A turbojet-powered, ultra-low observable, subsonic missile, designated "TP15" ("TP" standing for Turbo Prop whilst being the fifteenth version of the subsonic solution chosen after examining a wide range of different configurations and test scenarios), which is designed and optimised to overcome enemy defensive systems by avoiding detection like the SCALP and Exocet. The TP15, whose development is led by the UK, will feature a next-generation imaging infrared seeker and is expected to primarily focus on engaging ground targets such as military depots, headquarters, and reinforced concrete facilities, whilst maintaining a secondary anti-ship capability. The company stated that the first prototype of the TP15, approximately measuring just over 5 metres (16 ft) long, has already been manufactured and that weapon assessment phase tasks saw the missile subjected to "extreme" radio-frequency (RF) trials in a dedicated RF signature testing facility. It was also confirmed that Rolls Royce and Safran were jointly responsible for the design and development of the missile's turbojet engine.
- A ramjet-powered, highly-manoeuverable, supersonic missile, designated "RJ10" ("RJ" standing for Ramjet and "10" presumably for the tenth version of the supersonic solution), which will use speed and agility to overcome enemy defences. The RJ10, whose development is led by France, is more akin to designs MBDA had, until now, reserved for strategic deterrence (i.e. the ASMP and its modernized variants). It will feature a next-generation radiofrequency seeker and will be optimised to engage naval targets, perform SEAD/DEAD duties and is also expected to feature an anti-air capability for use against High Value Airborne Assets (HVAAs) such as AWACS and tanker aircraft at long ranges. The RJ10's propulsion system was stated to have undergone "exhaustive" supersonic wind-tunnel testing at MBDA France's facility in Bourges, where the ramjets for the ASMP family were developed and produced. It was also revealed French defence electronics specialist, Thales, and MBDA UK had jointly begun testing of the missile's RF seeker.

France and the UK have, so far, each been responsible for 90% of the workload pertaining to the RJ10 and TP15 respectively; French involvement in the British-led TP15 being primarily centered around its propulsion system, whilst British involvement in the French-led RJ10 mainly revolves around its seeker. Trials completed so far across both missiles include tests on their advanced seekers, tests of their warheads and fuzing systems, as well as aerodynamic trials and other propulsion-related tests. Italy's membership within the programme is due to be finalised at the start of 2025, likely prompting a restructuring of the workshare. All three nations intend to acquire both missile systems.

The launch platforms for the FC/ASW are expected to include the FREMM and Type 26 frigates, Eurofighter Typhoon and Dassault Rafale fighter jets, and possibly the products of the GCAP and FCAS 6th generation fighter programmes. The programme is reportedly not expected to produce any missile capable of being launched from submarines as the TP15 and RJ10's dimensions will not be compatible with torpedo tubes. MBDA is therefore pitching its Exocet SM40, currently under development, as a successor to France's Exocet SM39 submarine-launched anti-ship missile post-2030. At The 2025 Paris Air Show, MBDA showed animations of the TP-15 being vertically launched from the Mark 41 VLS of a Type 26 frigate, and an RJ-10 being canister-launched from a FREMM frigate.

On 9 September 2025, MBDA annouced the FC/ASW programme had been renamed to STRATUS, with TP15 now known as Stratus Low Observable (LO) and the RJ10 as Stratus Rapid Strike (RS). This announcement also saw the unveiling of the final airframe design for Stratus LO, as well as outlining a development path for a potential ground-launched capability for both missiles if requested. Both missiles are described as being expected to operate in the maritime domain well into the 2060s.

The UK's 2026 Defence Investment Plan, published 30 June 2026, outlined the UK would invest £1.4 billion into the development of Stratus between 2026 and 2030. In July 2026, the French launched Increment 0 of Stratus LO programme with a budget of €1.82 billion. This is set to be followed Increment 1 work in the future.

On 29 October 2026, ahead of Euronaval 2026 exhibition, it was reported that Italy is presently only set to join the development of Stratus-LO. Meanwhile, the contract award for Stratus-RS could arrive before or after Euronaval, whilst the full contract for Stratus-LO is expected between the late 2026 and early 2027.

On 10 November 2026, the Italian Ministry of Defence’s 2026–2028 Multi-Year Defence Programming Document (Documento Programmatico Pluriennale) confirmed plans to equip the Italian Air Force's Eurofighters with Stratus-LO. Additionally, development is planned to start on a new vertical launching system expected to be integrated aboard the Italian Navy's future DDX Destroyers and later the FREMM-EVO frigates. This new VLS is expected to feature larger launch cells than the existing Sylver VLS and will be designed to launch Stratus-LO as well as the Aster missile family and the future Aquila endo-atmospheric interceptor.

== Variants ==
On 10 September 2025 at DSEI 2025 in London, MBDA unveiled the official designation for FC/ASW programme under the name STRATUS. Two missile variants were confirmed based on earlier prototypes:

- STRATUS LO (Low Observable): a long-range subsonic, highly stealthy missile based on the TP15;
- STRATUS RS (Rapid Strike): a long-range supersonic, highly manoeuvrable, ramjet-powered missile based on the RJ10.

STRATUS LO is optimised for deep-strike and land-attack missions, while STRATUS RS is intended to fulfil anti-surface/anti-ship missions as well as neutralize high-value air assets. Both missiles are expected to be capable of SEAD/DEAD missions.

== Operators ==
=== Future operators ===
France

- French Air and Space Force
- French Navy

Italy

- Italian Air Force - Expected to enter service on the Eurofighter Typhoon.
- Italian Navy - Expected to enter service on the DDX Destroyers and later FREMM-EVO frigates following the development of new vertical launching system.

United Kingdom

- Royal Air Force - Expected to enter service on the Eurofighter Typhoon by the "early 2030s".
- Royal Navy - Expected to enter service on the Type 26 Frigate by the "early 2030s". Potentially also to be integrated onto the Type 31 Frigate.

=== STRATUS Rapid Strike ===
France

- French Air and Space Force - Expected to be integrated on Dassault Rafale F5 standard by early 2030s and the Future Combat Aircraft (ACF).
- French Navy - Expected to be integrated on Dassault Rafale F5 standard by early 2030s and the Future Combat Aircraft (ACF)

United Kingdom

- Royal Air Force
- Royal Navy

== Similar missiles ==
=== STRATUS LO ===
- AGM-158 JASSM - an American subsonic, low-observable, land attack cruise missile.
- AGM-158C LRASM - an American subsonic, low-observable, anti-ship cruise missile derived from the AGM-158 JASSM.

=== STRATUS RS ===
- ASM-3 – a Japanese supersonic anti-ship missile.
- BrahMos – an Indo-Russian supersonic anti-ship missile derived from the P-800 Oniks.
- Hsiung Feng III - a Taiwanese supersonic anti-ship missile.
- P-800 Oniks – a Russian supersonic anti-ship missile.
- YJ-12 – a Chinese supersonic anti-ship missile.

== See also ==
- Future of the French Navy
- Future of the Italian Navy
- Future of the Royal Air Force
- Future of the Royal Navy
