= HMS Formidable (Type 31 frigate) =

Type 31 frigates

History

United Kingdom
- Name: Formidable
- Namesake: HMS Formidable (67)
- Builder: Babcock International, Rosyth
- Laid down: 9 December 2025
- Commissioned: Projected early 2030s.
- Status: Under construction

General characteristics
- Class & type: Type 31 frigate
- Displacement: 5,700 t (5,600 long tons)
- Length: 138.7 m (455 ft 1 in)
- Installed power: 4 × Rolls Royce/MTU 20V 8000 M71 (8.2 MW) diesel engines; 4 × Rolls Royce/MTU 16V 2000 M41B (900 kW) generators
- Propulsion: MAN Alpha VBS Mk 5 controllable pitch propeller, two shafts, CODAD
- Speed: In excess of 28 knots (52 km/h; 32 mph)
- Endurance: 9,000 nmi (17,000 km; 10,000 mi)
- Complement: c. 110 (accommodation for up to 190)
- Sensors & processing systems: TACTICOS combat management system, Thales NS110 3D radar, Raytheon Warship Integrated Navigation and Bridge System, Terma Scanter and Raytheon NSX navigation radars, 2 Mirador Mk2 EOS, Viasat Ultrahigh-frequency satellite communications
- Electronic warfare & decoys: Vigile-D ESM
- Armament: Missiles: Sea Ceptor surface-to-air missile silos; [Mark 41 launch system and Naval Strike Missiles envisaged for future incorporation]; Guns: 1 × 57 mm Mk 110 main gun; 2 × 40 mm Mk 4 secondary guns; 4 × 7.62 mm General purpose machine guns
- Aircraft carried: 1 × Wildcat, or; 1 × Merlin,
- Aviation facilities: Helicopter hangar and flight deck
- Notes: Mission bay under flight deck for 6 TEUs. 3 boat bays for RHIBs and USVs/UUVs.

HMS Formidable is a Type 31 frigate of the Royal Navy and the sixth vessel named after the word formidable. In May 2021, the names of the five planned Type 31 ships were announced by the First Sea Lord. The names were selected to represent key themes that represent the future plans of the Royal Navy and Royal Marines - forward deployment of ships overseas; operating in the North Atlantic; carrier operations; technology and innovation; and the Future Commando Force.

Formidable, named after the World War II-era aircraft carrier HMS Formidable (67), represents carrier operations. Formidable took part in the Battle of Cape Matapan, Operation Torch, attacked the German battleship Tirpitz, and fought against Japan in the Pacific theatre. The plan for the Type 31 project originally envisaged all five units of the class being in service by February 2030. However, by 2026, the planned in-service dates for ships following HMS Venturer had slipped into the early 2030s.

== Construction ==
First steel cut on the new ship took place in October 2024 and the keel was formally laid down in December 2025.

The government's 2026 Defence Investment Plan indicated that both the Mark 41 launch system and Naval Strike Missiles were planned for future incorporation in the ship, though the precise timing remained uncertain.
