= HMS Venturer (Type 31 frigate) =

Type 31 Frigate

History

United Kingdom
- Name: Venturer
- Namesake: HMS Venturer (P68)
- Builder: Babcock, Rosyth
- Laid down: 26 April 2022
- Launched: 14 June 2025
- Sponsored by: The Princess Royal
- Home port: HMNB Portsmouth
- Identification: Pennant number F12
- Status: Fitting out

General characteristics
- Class & type: Type 31 frigate
- Displacement: 5,700 t (5,600 long tons)
- Length: 138.7 m (455 ft 1 in)
- Installed power: 4 × Rolls Royce/MTU 20V 8000 M71 8.2 MW (11,000 hp) diesel engines; 4 × Rolls Royce/MTU 16V 2000 M41B 900 kW (1,200 hp) generators
- Propulsion: MAN Alpha VBS Mk 5 controllable pitch propeller, two shafts, CODAD
- Speed: > 28 knots
- Endurance: 9,000 nmi (17,000 km; 10,000 mi)
- Complement: c. 110 (accommodation for up to 190)
- Sensors & processing systems: Thales TACTICOS combat management system, Thales NS110 3D radar, Anschütz Warship Integrated Navigation and Bridge System, Terma Scanter and Anschütz NSX navigation radars, 2 Mirador Mk2 EOS, Viasat Ultrahigh-frequency satellite communications
- Electronic warfare & decoys: Vigile-D ESM
- Armament: Missile system: 2 × 6 - Sea Ceptor surface-to-air missile silos; [Mark 41 launch system and Naval Strike Missiles envisaged for future incorporation]; Guns: 1 × Bofors 57 mm Mk 110 main gun; 2 × Bofors 40 mm Mk 4 secondary guns; 4 × 7.62 mm General purpose machine guns or other machine guns
- Aircraft carried: 1 × Wildcat or Merlin helicopter
- Aviation facilities: Helicopter hangar and flight deck
- Notes: Mission bay under flight deck for 6 TEUs. 3 boat bays for RHIBs and USVs/UUVs.

HMS Venturer (pennant number F12) is the lead ship of the Type 31 frigate-class that will serve with the Royal Navy and the seventh vessel named HMS Venturer.

In May 2021, the names of the five planned Type 31 ships were announced by the First Sea Lord. The names were selected to represent key themes that represent the future plans of the Royal Navy and Royal Marines. Venturer, named after the Second World War submarine Venturer (P68), the only submarine ever to have, while underwater, destroyed an enemy submarine that was also underwater, symbolises technology and innovation.

As of 2023, planning envisaged Venturer being launched in 2024 and entering service by 2025. In mid-2024 it was reported that the Type 31 program was likely behind schedule with Venturer not having been launched by mid-2024 as had been planned and with the ship then envisaged for service entry in late 2026/early 2027. However, as of 2026, Luke Pollard, UK Minister for Defence Readiness, projected that HMS Venturer's in-service date would be by the "end of the decade", though uncertainty remained even about that projection. In October 2026, the shipbuilder, Babcock, indicated that they expected to deliver the ship to the navy in 2028. The rest of the class was projected to enter service thereafter.

First steel was cut for the new ship on 23 September 2021 signalling the start of construction. The keel of the ship was ceremonially laid down in April 2022. The ship was launched, by being floated off a launch barge, in June 2025. The ship is currently in the process of fitting out.

The government's 2026 Defence Investment Plan indicated that both the Mark 41 launch system and Naval Strike Missiles were planned for future incorporation in the ship, though the precise timing remained uncertain.

== Affiliations ==
- County of Essex
- Worshipful Company of Ironmongers
- Town of Hartlepool
