= HMS Bulldog (Type 31 frigate) =

Type 31 frigates

History

United Kingdom
- Name: Bulldog
- Namesake: HMS Bulldog (H91)
- Builder: Babcock International, Rosyth
- Status: Under construction

General characteristics
- Class & type: Type 31 frigate
- Displacement: 5,700 t (5,600 long tons)
- Length: 138.7 m (455 ft 1 in)
- Installed power: 4 × Rolls Royce/MTU 20V 8000 M71 (8.2 MW) diesel engines 4 × Rolls Royce/MTU 16V 2000 M41B (900 kW) generators
- Propulsion: MAN Alpha VBS Mk 5 controllable pitch propeller, two shafts, CODAD
- Speed: In excess of 28 knots (52 km/h; 32 mph)
- Endurance: 9,000 nmi (17,000 km; 10,000 mi)
- Complement: c. 110 (accommodation for up to 190)
- Sensors & processing systems: Thales TACTICOS combat management system, Thales NS110 3D radar, Raytheon Warship Integrated Navigation and Bridge System, Terma Scanter and Raytheon NSX navigation radars, 2 Mirador Mk2 EOS, Viasat Ultrahigh-frequency satellite communications
- Electronic warfare & decoys: Vigile-D ESM
- Armament: Missiles: Sea Ceptor surface-to-air missile silos; [Mark 41 launch system and Naval Strike Missiles envisaged for future incorporation]; Guns: 1 × 57 mm Mk 110 main gun; 2 × 40 mm Mk 4 secondary guns; 4 × 7.62 mm General purpose machine guns
- Aircraft carried: 1 × Wildcat, or; 1 × Merlin,
- Aviation facilities: Helicopter hangar and flight deck
- Notes: Mission bay under flight deck for 6 TEUs. 3 boat bays for RHIBs and USVs/UUVs.

HMS Bulldog is a Type 31 frigate of the Royal Navy and the eighth vessel named Bulldog. The name was selected to represent key themes that represent the future plans of the Royal Navy and Royal Marines.

Bulldog, named after the Second World War B-class destroyer HMS Bulldog (H91), which escorted convoys in the Atlantic, was chosen to represent operations in the North Atlantic. Bulldog captured a German Enigma machine and associated codebooks that were on board U-boat U-110. Its capture enabled British intelligence to decipher German naval messages. The plan for the Type 31 project originally envisaged all five units of the class being in service by February 2030. However, by 2026, the planned in-service dates for ships following HMS Venturer had slipped into the early 2030s.

The first steel for HMS Bulldog was cut on 24 February 2026.
