= HMS Campbeltown (Type 31 frigate) =

Type 31 frigates

History

United Kingdom
- Name: Campbeltown
- Namesake: HMS Campbeltown (I42)
- Builder: Babcock, Rosyth
- Status: Planned

General characteristics
- Class & type: Type 31 frigate
- Displacement: 5,700 t (5,600 long tons)
- Length: 138.7 m (455 ft 1 in)
- Installed power: 4 × Rolls Royce/MTU 20V 8000 M71 (8.2 MW) diesel engines; 4 × Rolls Royce/MTU 16V 2000 M41B (900 kW) generators
- Propulsion: MAN Alpha VBS Mk 5 controllable pitch propeller, two shafts, CODAD
- Speed: In excess of 28 knots (52 km/h; 32 mph)
- Endurance: 9,000 nmi (17,000 km; 10,000 mi)
- Complement: c. 110 (accommodation for up to 190)
- Sensors & processing systems: TACTICOS combat management system, Thales NS110 3D radar, Raytheon Warship Integrated Navigation and Bridge System, Terma Scanter and Raytheon NSX navigation radars, 2 Mirador Mk2 EOS, Viasat Ultrahigh-frequency satellite communications
- Electronic warfare & decoys: Vigile-D ESM
- Armament: Missiles: Sea Ceptor surface-to-air missile silos; [Mark 41 launch system and Naval Strike Missiles envisaged for future incorporation]; Guns: 1 × 57 mm Mk 110 main gun; 2 × 40 mm Mk 4 secondary guns; 4 × 7.62 mm General purpose machine guns
- Aircraft carried: 1 × Wildcat, or; 1 × Merlin,
- Aviation facilities: Helicopter hangar and flight deck
- Notes: Mission bay under flight deck for 6 TEUs. 3 boat bays for RHIBs and USVs/UUVs.

HMS Campbeltown is to be a Type 31 frigate of the Royal Navy and the third vessel named after Campbeltown, a town in Argyll and Bute in Scotland. In May 2021, the names of the five planned Type 31 ships were announced by the First Sea Lord. The names were selected to represent key themes that represent the future plans of the Royal Navy and Royal Marines, with Campbeltown after first ship to bear the name, which was pivotal in the St Nazaire raid, a major commando attack on the occupied port of St Nazaire and the destruction of its dry dock in 1942. The plan for the Type 31 project originally envisaged all five units of the class being in service by February 2030. However, by 2026, the planned in-service dates for ships following HMS Venturer had slipped into the early 2030s.
