= Type 31 frigate =

Future class of frigates of the Royal Navy

- A graphic of Type 31 frigate launching a missile

Class overview
- Name: Type 31 Frigate
- Builders: Babcock International; PAL Indonesia; PGZ Stocznia Wojenna
- Operators: Royal Navy; Indonesian Navy; Polish Navy
- Preceded by: Type 23 frigate
- Subclasses: Balaputradewa-class frigate (Indonesia); Wicher-class frigate (Poland)
- Cost: £268 million (2019) (equivalent to £330 million in 2024) per unit (est., UK)
- In service: From 2028/29
- Planned: 12 (total); 5 (UK); 4 (Indonesia); 3 (Poland)
- Building: 8
- Completed: 4 (Fitting out)

General characteristics
- Type: General purpose Frigate
- Displacement: UK & Poland: 5,700 t (5,600 long tons); 7,000 t (6,900 long tons) (Also listed); Indonesia: 5,996 t (5,901 long tons) (Standard); 6,625 t (6,520 long tons) (Full load)
- Length: UK & Poland: 138.7 m (455 ft 1 in); Indonesia: 140 m (459 ft 4 in)
- Installed power: 4 × Rolls Royce/MTU 20V 8000 M71 (8.2 MW) diesel engines; 4 × Rolls Royce/MTU 16V 2000 M41B (900 kW) generators; or 4 × Caterpillar 3512C (1360 kW) generators
- Propulsion: CODAD propulsion system; MAN Alpha VBS Mk 5 controllable pitch propeller; 2 × Shafts
- Speed: In excess of 28 knots (52 km/h; 32 mph)
- Endurance: 9,000 nmi (17,000 km; 10,000 mi) at 18 knots (33 km/h; 21 mph)
- Complement: c. 110 (accommodation for up to 190)
- Sensors & processing systems: UK & Poland: Thales Nederland TACTICOS combat management system; Thales NS110 4D Dual-Axis Multi-Beam AESA Radar; Thales Artemis 360 Naval InfraRed search and track system; Anschütz Warship Integrated Navigation and Bridge System; Terma Scanter and Anschütz NSX navigation radars; 2 × Mirador Mk2 EOS; Viasat Ultrahigh-frequency satellite communications; Indonesia (Balaputradewa class) - Main Contract: HAVELSAN ADVENT combat management system (CMS); ASELSAN CENK 350-N (Mete Han) X-band fixed-face AESA multi-function radar; ASELSAN MAR-D / CENK 200-N air and surface surveillance and helicopter approach control radar; ASELSAN AKREP fire-control radar; ASELSAN FERSAH 100-N/MF hull-mounted sonar; ELT Group electronic warfare suite (R-ESM, C-ESM, COMINT, R-ECM); Indonesia - Fitted For But Not With (FFBNW): ASELSAN CENK 400-N S-band AESA long-range air and surface surveillance radar
- Electronic warfare & decoys: UK & Poland: MEWSIC; SEA Ancilia countermeasures system; Surface Ship Torpedo Defence; Indonesia: ELT Group suite including R-ESM, C-ESM, COMINT, and R-ECM jammers; ASELSAN decoy launchers
- Armament: UK: Missiles: Sea Ceptor surface-to-air missile silos fitted with CAMM missiles; 32-cell Mk 41 VLS possibly from hull 3 onwards; first two ships to be retrofitted after service entry; Naval Strike Missiles (planned for incorporation); Guns: 1 × 57 mm Mark 110 gun; 2 × Bofors 40 Mk4 gun; 12.7 mm Heavy Machine Guns; Indonesia (Balaputradewa class) - Main Contract: Guns: 2 × Leonardo OTO Melara 76 mm Super Rapid (A and B position, tandem bow configuration); 1 × Rheinmetall Oerlikon 35 mm Millennium Gun (CIWS); 4 × 12.7 mm Leonardo Lionfish RCWS; Indonesia - Fitted For But Not With (FFBNW) (Contract signed 11 June 2025): Missiles: 64-cell ROKETSAN MİDLAS Universal VLS (8 × 8-cell modules); capable of launching: HİSAR-D medium-range surface-to-air missile (~25 km range); SİPER Block 1-D long-range surface-to-air missile (~150 km range); ATMACA vertically-launched anti-ship missile; Anti-submarine warfare: 2 × Leonardo B515/3 triple 324 mm torpedo launchers for MU90 lightweight torpedoes
- Aircraft carried: 1 × AgustaWestland AW159 Wildcat + UAV; or 1 × AgustaWestland AW101 Merlin
- Aviation facilities: Helicopter hangar sized for Merlin and flight deck sized for Boeing CH-47 Chinook
- Notes: Mission bay under flight deck for 6 TEUs; 3 boat bays for RHIBs and USVs/UUVs

The Type 31 frigate, also known as the Inspiration class, formerly known as the Type 31e frigate or General Purpose Frigate (GPF), is a class of five frigates being built for the United Kingdom's Royal Navy, with variants also being built for the Indonesian and Polish navies. The Type 31 is intended to enter service in the 2020s alongside the eight submarine-hunting Type 26 frigates, replacing five general-purpose Type 23 frigates. The Type 31 is part of the British government's "National Shipbuilding Strategy".

Under construction by Babcock International, it is based on the Odense Maritime Technology (OMT) Iver Huitfeldt-class frigate hull and is marketed under the name Arrowhead 140 (AH140). The design was sold to Indonesia as the four ship Balaputradewa-class frigate, equipped with Turkish MiDLAS VLS, in September 2021, and to Poland for the three ship Wicher-class frigates in March 2022.

== Development ==
The 2010 Strategic Defence and Security Review (SDSR) authorised the Global Combat Ship (GCS) programme, which would replace the Royal Navy's thirteen Type 23 frigates. Earlier that year, BAE Systems was awarded a four-year, £127 million contract by the Ministry of Defence (MoD) to design the new class. It was planned that two variants of the class would be built: five general purpose frigates and eight anti-submarine warfare frigates. There was to be little difference between the two variants, except for the Sonar 2087. Initial expectations were that construction would start in 2016 and the ships would gradually replace the Type 23 frigates by the mid-2030s. The 2015 Defence Review decided that only the eight anti-submarine warfare Type 26 frigates would be ordered and five general purpose frigates to an altogether different design would be ordered to give at least 13 frigates in RN service.

=== General Purpose Frigate ===
The resultant General Purpose Frigate (GPFF) was to be a lighter, flexible and more affordable general purpose frigate class. According to the 2015 SDSR, the lower cost of these frigates could lead to the Royal Navy acquiring more than five, therefore increasing its overall numbers of frigates and destroyers. During a defence and security lecture in July 2016, GPFF was referred to as the Type 31 frigate by the First Sea Lord, Admiral Sir Philip Jones, who also stated that Type 31 frigates could permanently operate "East of Suez"—from the Persian Gulf region to the Asia-Pacific.

During the same month, BAE Systems revealed two general purpose frigate designs: the "Avenger class", which was based on the "Amazonas-class/River-class Batch 2 offshore patrol vessel", and the "Cutlass class" that was described as a "significantly stretched and enhanced derivation of the Al Shamikh-class corvette design". The Sunday Times stated that Babcock International and BMT had also submitted one design each.

Jones described the GPFF as "to be a much less high-end ship. It is still a complex warship, and it is still able to protect and defend and to exert influence around the world, but it is deliberately shaped with lessons from wider industry and off-the-shelf technology to make it... more appealing to operate at a slightly lower end of Royal Navy operations." IHS Janes described it as a "credible frigate" that will cover "maritime security, maritime counter-terrorism and counter-piracy operations, escort duties, and naval fire support... [sitting] between the high-end capability delivered by the Type 26 and Type 45, and the constabulary-oriented outputs to be delivered by the five River-class Batch 2 OPVs."

A September 2017 graphic released by the Royal Navy stressed modular adaptability and flexible construction of the design for export opportunities. Core requirements of the Type 31e frigate included a medium calibre gun, point defence systems, hangar and a flight deck for Wildcat or ten tonne helicopter operated by a crew of around 100 with space for 40 more personnel. The British government released a Request for information (RFI) in September 2017, detailing the desired characteristics of the Type 31e. The RFI provided greater details such as a "Medium Calibre Gun" of greater than 57 mm (2.2 in), a point defence anti-air missile system and the optional ability to launch and recover unmanned aerial vehicles.

=== National Shipbuilding Strategy ===
In October 2017, the Financial Times stated that "officials inside the Ministry of Defence, the Treasury and Royal Navy have long resented the obligation, set a decade ago, to maintain skills and shipbuilding capacity at BAE's shipyards on the Clyde regardless of naval needs. It quoted Francis Tusa, a defence analyst, who argued that the competition appeared to be designed to break BAE's hold on naval shipbuilding; "were they to have bid as BAE Systems, they wouldn't win. That is absolutely obvious. The fact is that the Type 31 is slanted probably to exclude any bid that includes BAE." However, this was denied by the MoD, which stated that the competition was designed to improve speed of delivery and reduce cost.

In order to maintain national shipbuilding capacity, the 2017 national shipbuilding strategy proposed ordering an initial batch of five Type 31e frigates with an initial in-service date in 2023, with their cost limited to a maximum of £250m each, to be followed by a second batch order of Type 31 for the Royal Navy.

The refresh to the National Shipbuilding Strategy published by the UK Government in March 2022 stated: Type 31, the pathfinder project of the 2017 strategy, got to contract on schedule and for the headline price demanded, with the capability exceeding many expectations.

=== Design tenders ===
Throughout 2017, several designs from different companies were suggested as contenders for the Type 31. BAE submitted two designs, "Avenger", essentially an improved Batch 3 River-class OPV, and "Cutlass", a significantly stretched and enhanced derivation of the Al Shamikh-class corvette. BMT submitted a design called "Venator 110", with Steller Systems putting forward project "Spartan", and Babcock offered a design named "Arrowhead 120".

In October 2017, BAE Systems announced that it would withdraw from the Type 31e competition as a main contractor, citing the capacity constraints of its shipyards on the Clyde, which were full with the work on the new River-class patrol vessels and Type 26 frigates. Instead, BAE announced a partnership with Cammell Laird, whereby BAE would provide its expertise in design and systems integration, while Cammell Laird would be the prime contractor and be responsible for the assembly of the ships at its yard at Birkenhead. The planned design was named "Leander", a reference to three previous classes of ship in the Royal Navy.

In November 2017, it was announced that BMT and Babcock signed a co-operation agreement for the Type 31. They did not choose between their respective "Venator 110" or "Arrowhead 120" designs, but instead would explore their designs to determine the best possible option. In late May 2018, Babcock, partnered with BMT, and Thales Group announced the "Arrowhead 140" design, based on the hull of the Danish Iver Huitfeldt-class frigates.

The competition was suspended on 20 July 2018 due to 'insufficient compliant bids' being received; however, The Times claimed this was due to a "funding crisis". The competition was restarted in August 2018.

=== Competitive design phase selection ===
On 10 December 2018, three groups were selected for the competitive design phase:

- BAE Systems/Cammell Laird with their planned Leander design
- Babcock/BMT/Thales with their Arrowhead 140 design (AH140)
- Atlas Elektronik UK/ThyssenKrupp Marine Systems, which was likely to be based on the MEKO A-200 design

Both the BAE Systems and Babcock led entrants had already been put forward when the competition was temporarily suspended. The third bid was submitted by the Atlas Elektronik UK-led team. Both the Babcock and Atlas proposals included Ferguson Marine on the Clyde and Harland & Wolff in Belfast. By August 2019, both of these companies announced that they were in financial difficulties.

In September 2019 the Arrowhead 140 design was selected as the base design for the Type 31 frigate. A contract was formally awarded to Babcock on 15 November 2019, for an average production cost of £250 million per ship and an overall programme cost set to be £2 billion with £1.25 billion value to Babcock.

On 20 January 2020, the Public Accounts Committee was informed by the Permanent Secretary for Defence that the first ship will be launched by 2023, but the in-service date will be in 2027. Earlier statements had been for an in-service date would be in 2023. In September 2022, John Howie, chief corporate affairs officer for Babcock International, stated that all five ships would be "delivered" to the Navy by 2028, though other sources suggested that the actual "in service" date might be somewhat later.

== Arrowhead 140 ==
The AH140 design submitted by Babcock, BMT, and Thales is a development of the Iver Huitfeldt-class frigates in service with the Royal Danish Navy.

The Type 31 frigate, developed from Babcock's Arrowhead-140 design and based on the Royal Danish Navy's Iver Huitfeldt class, is not a direct copy but a significantly reworked platform. It has been extensively redesigned to comply with modern standards, including Lloyd's Register Naval Ship Rules, NATO's ANEP-77 Naval Ship Code, and a broad range of UK defence requirements such as DefStan 02-900. This redesign delivers enhanced survivability, system redundancy, and resilience compared to older Royal Navy escort ships like the Type 23 and Type 45, which were built to earlier generations of standards.

- General Purpose – default option (Type 31).
- Anti-air warfare – Leverages the existing anti-air capabilities of the parent design through use of an additional long range radar such as the SMART/L or S1850M enabling wide area air defence and ballistic missile defence (BMD).
- Anti-submarine warfare – additional acoustic reduction measures such as the rafting of machinery spaces as well as provisions for a towed array sonar to the stern.
- Mine countermeasure / amphibious warfare / Multi-Mission platform – In 2023 Babcock revealed their Multi-Role Naval Platform (A140 MNP), a variant of the AH140 with mission modularity in mind and likely as a contending design for the Royal Navy's Type 32 frigate program. The design features a stern boat ramp connected to the existing mission bay under the flight deck, a side hydraulic ramp, an enlarged hangar with capacity for up to 2x AugustaWestland Merlin AW101 sized helicopters, directly connected to a full-width mission bay replacing the 32-cell VLS complex amidships capable of supporting up to three 11-metre craft (e.g. unmanned surface vehicles, rigid inflatable boats) or containers. The design is also compatible with SH Defence's CUBE system for the embarkation and movement of container stores on board.

AH140 also features a wide degree of flexibility in the component systems. It is capable of being fitted with a variety of radar masts (fixed or rotating), up to four boat bays for RHIBs or small USVs and the customer's choice of medium and small calibre gun options (up-to 127 mm in position A and up-to 76 mm in position B). There are several options for vertical launching systems (VLS) available; from a 24-cell CAMM 'mushroom farm' configuration as cost and weight saving option, up to a 32-cell strike length Mark 41 vertical launch system for long range surface-to-air missiles (SAMs) or surface-to-surface missiles (SSMs) that can be positioned amidships.

An additional 16-cell Mark 41 complex can be positioned forward of the bridge by removing the gun mount from Position B enabling either a 48-cell loadout or to free up the central sections for other facilities such as a full-width mission bay. Previous renderings of the Red-White frigate design for Indonesia have also shown an additional 56 cells of an indeterminant type and length added to the rear of the main gun suggesting that even greater level weapon customisation is available in the design.

Another major characteristic of the AH140 is that it has dedicated accommodation for more than 180 personnel but only requires a crew of less than 100, allowing for both lower sustainment costs but also for a large number of mission specific personnel such as flight crew, remote system operators, marines / special forces to be embarked, or refugees in the case of humanitarian operations.

== Exports ==
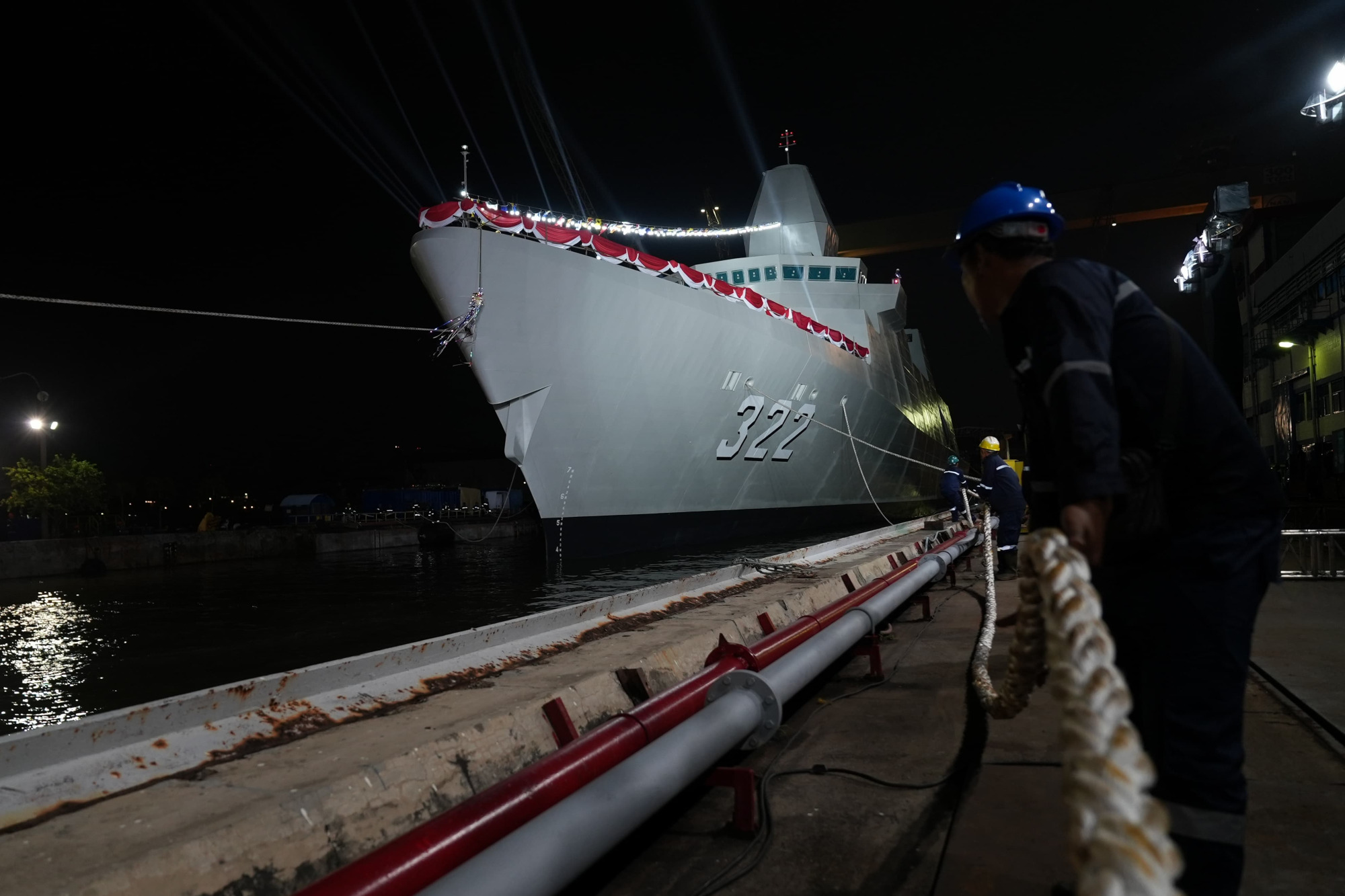
KRI Balaputradewa, the first Indonesian Red White frigate, during its launching

ORP Wicher (274), the first Polish frigate being built under the „Miecznik” program (Project 106 frigates)

In September 2021, Babcock signed an agreement with PT PAL Indonesia allowing it to design two AH140 derivatives for the Indonesian Navy. The class are known locally as Fregat Merah Putih ("Red-White Frigate"). The first Red White frigate had its steel cut in December 2022. In January 2026, Indonesia ordered two additional units, bringing the total purchased to four.

In March 2022, Babcock won the frigate competition for the Polish Navy. The Polish Armaments Agency selected Babcock's AH140 from three different platform design proposals provided by the PGZ-Miecznik consortium ("miecznik" is Polish for "swordfish"). In August 2023, the construction of the first in a series of three Project 106 frigates began at PGZ Stocznia Wojenna.

Following suggestions that the Royal Australian Navy (RAN) might adopt a "two-tier" surface combatant mix pairing the tier one Hobart-class destroyers and Hunter-class frigates with a smaller, less capable, but cheaper class for the RAN, Babcock Australasia reportedly offered the Arrowhead 140 to meet this possible requirement. However, the AH140 design was subsequently not selected as a candidate for the Australian general purpose frigate program after it was officially announced by the Australian government in 2024. On 5 August 2025 the RAN selected the Improved Mogami-class frigate.

In October 2023, Babcock formally began building its bid for the Royal New Zealand Navy (RNZN) and started looking for New Zealand-based small medium enterprises (SMEs) to develop a domestic supply chain. On 7 May 2026, the New Zealand Ministry of Defense confirmed that the Type 31 and the improved Mogami were the two contenders to replace the RNZN's Anzac-class frigates.

In September 2025, the Financial Times reported on discussions related to the potential purchase of Type 31 derived units by both the Royal Swedish and Royal Danish navies. Denmark's purchase would involve three ships built primarily in the UK, with the potential for additional units to be constructed domestically, to replace the existing Iver Huitfeldt class. These would be primarily intended for the air defence mission, with a weapon and sensor fit comparable to the Polish Wicher class. Sweden's requirement is for four ships to constitute the Luleå-class ships currently under procurement. Denmark's purchase was said to be very close to being finalised, while the Swedish purchase was more uncertain, with the competition eventually won by the French FDI class frigate.

== Characteristics ==
=== Royal Navy – Type 31 (Inspiration class) ===
The Inspiration class will have a length of 138.7 m (455 ft 1 in), a beam of 20.36 m (66.8 ft) and a displacement of 7,000 tonnes (6,900 long tons). It will have a crew complement of about 110 sailors (with available accommodation for about 80 additional personnel), a total range of 7,500 nautical miles (13,900 km; 8,600 mi), and a top speed of over 26 knots (48 km/h; 30 mph).

The procurement of the equipment fit for the Type 31 differs greatly from traditional practices, with design decisions being made by the prime contractor Babcock or mission systems integrator Thales acting as the design authority rather than the Defence Equipment and Support (DE&S) organisation or Royal Navy personnel, in accordance to key characteristics laid down by the MoD for a general purpose frigate. The published Babcock engineering paper states: "The various rule sets and standards used worldwide to design ships deliver varying levels of capability into a warship, even amongst NATO navies. The RN’s requirements have been honed by real-world and hard-won naval combat experience in the missile age; driving some of the most exacting standards to which a warship can be designed. The Type 31 Frigate now complies with these requirements and latest standards, materially increasing its performance over many overseas Frigate designs and the legacy 1980s-designed Type 23 General Purpose Frigate that it will replace in RN service."

On 1 October 2020, BAE Systems Bofors announced it was under contract to supply five Bofors 57 mm Mk3 medium calibre guns and ten Bofors 40 mm Mk4 small calibre guns to the Royal Navy for the first five Type 31 frigates. The 57 mm Mk3 will equip the A position whilst two 40 mm Mk4s will be mounted in positions B and Y in a broadside configuration. In November 2022 the MoD placed a contract with BAE Systems Bofors training facilities for the Bofors 57 mm Mk3 and 40 mm Mk4 naval gun systems that will be supplied with the five Type 31 Frigates

In 2019, Forces News reported that the design would have Sea Ceptor (CAMM) missiles, an advanced air and surface surveillance and target indication radar such as the Thales NS110 and be able to operate either an AgustaWestland Wildcat HMA2 or an AgustaWestland Merlin HM2. Type 31 will have the first 4D Dual-Axis, Multi-Beam, Active Electronically Scanned Array (AESA) Radar to be fitted to a RN Frigate [Thales NS110].

The vertical launching system for the Type 31 and its associated missile loadout has gone through a number of revisions over the course of its development. Originally, the design would retain, but would however be "fitted-for-but-not-with" its 32-cell strike length Mark 41 Vertical Launching System and in its place was to be a Sea Ceptor 24-cell 'mushroom farm' in a similar configuration as found on the Type 23 frigates. This was later revised with a more modular version of the launcher consisting of two 2x3-cell launch modules with a reduction from 24 to 12 missiles possibly as a cost-saving venture.

In May 2023, the First Sea Lord Ben Key stated that Type 31 frigates would be fitted with the 32-cell Mark 41 Strike-Length complex. The exact missile mix for the Type 31 with the Mark-41 has yet to be confirmed but will likely eventually consist of at least 32x Sea Ceptor missiles quad-packed into one of the four 8-cell launch modules in addition to possibly integrating the forthcoming surface launched variant(s) of the Future Cruise/Anti-Ship Weapon(s) being developed jointly by the UK, France, and Italy for surface warfare capability. Other sources have previously suggested that the ship might incorporate the canister-launched Naval Strike Missiles which could be migrated over from the retiring Type 23 frigates and be fitted on the Type 31. In early 2024, it was reported that the Mark 41 system would not be integrated into the first Type 31 frigates and instead only be added during future capability insertion periods.

In early 2025 it became apparent that the decision to upgrade the armament would not come in time for the first two ships of the class to be fitted out with Mark 41, although contracts valued at £65 million for a Capability Insertion Period (CIP) for the five ships of the class were awarded in August of that year. Defence officials stated in March of 2026 that the Royal Navy was still in discussions with the US Navy on procurement and installation of Mark 41 VLS hardware, however they declined to give any details as regards timescale of delivery. Subsequently, the government's 2026 Defence Investment Plan indicated that both the Mark 41 launch system and Naval Strike Missiles were planned for incorporation in the ship.

In June 2023, the completed bow stem of the lead unit, HMS Venturer, revealed that a bow-mounted sonar will also not be part of the initial build of the ship.

On 26 March 2024, it was announced that Sea Gnat fixed decoy launching system would be replaced across the entire Royal Navy's escort fleet with SEA's Ancilia trainable decoy launcher including on the Type 31 following a £135 million contract. A pair of launchers will be mounted to the deck and will each provide twelve ready rounds of Infrared seduction decoys and radio frequency distraction decoys to defeat missile threats and possibly the ability to launch Martlet missiles in the future.

In June 2024, Babcock International published a technical paper outlining the development of the crewing model for the Royal Navy's Type 31 frigate. The aim was to minimise crew size while ensuring effective operation of a large surface combatant. The resulting crew complement reflects the smallest practical and sustainable ship's company for a 7,000-tonne general-purpose frigate capable of global combat operations, enabled by mature, high-readiness technologies and aligned with the latest naval rules and design standards.

In May 2026 it was reported that £140 million in cost overruns had been incurred "as a result of changes to the design and the long-term impacts of out-of-sequence build activity earlier in the programme".

=== Indonesian Navy – Red White Frigate ===
As part of the main contract, the Red White Frigate is to be armed with two OTO Melara 76 mm, one 35 mm Rheinmetall Oerlikon Millennium Gun, and two 12.7 mm Leonardo Lionfish RCWS, while the electronics and sensors includes Aselsan Mete Han / CENK-350-N AESA multi-function radar, Aselsan MAR-D / CENK-200-N air and surface surveillance and helicopter control radar, Aselsan FERSAH hull-mounted sonar, Aselsan Target Designation Sight, HAVELSAN ADVENT combat management system, HAVELSAN-made combat information center equipment, two 8x6 130 mm Aselsan KARTACA-N decoy launching systems, IFF system from Leonardo, and Elettronica electronic warfare suite.

Additional equipment in "fitted for-but not with" (FFBNW) configuration includes additional single OTO Melara 76 mm gun, additional two 12.7 mm Leonardo Lionfish RCWS, 8x8 cells (total 64 cells) Roketsan MİDLAS vertical launching system (VLS) for surface-to-surface and surface-to-air missiles, two Leonardo B515/3 triple 324mm torpedo launchers for MU90 LWT torpedoes, and Aselsan CENK 400-N AESA long-range air and surface surveillance radar.

=== Polish Navy – Wicher class ===
Class overview
- Name: Wicher-class frigate
- Builders: PGZ Stocznia Wojenna
- Operators: Polish Navy
- Planned: 3
- Building: 3
- Completed: 0

General characteristics
- Type: Frigate
- Displacement: 7,000 t (6,900 long tons)
- Length: 138.7 m (455 ft 1 in)
- Installed power: 4 × Rolls Royce/MTU 20V 8000 M71 (8.2 MW) diesel engines; 4 × Rolls Royce/MTU 16V 2000 M41B (900 kW) generators; or 4 × Caterpillar 3512C (1,360 kW) generators
- Propulsion: CODAD propulsion system; MAN Alpha VBS Mk 5 controllable pitch propeller; 2 × Shafts
- Speed: In excess of 28 knots (52 km/h; 32 mph)
- Endurance: 9,000 nmi (17,000 km; 10,000 mi)
- Complement: 80–100 (accommodation for >180)
- Sensors & processing systems: Blue Hunter hull sonar and CAPTAS-2 towed sonar Thales SM400 Sea Master AESA radar Thales NS50 4D AESA Radar
- Armament: 32-cell Mark 41 VLS for CAMM family of anti-air missiles; 1 × Leonardo 76mm Super Rapido Strales gun; 2 × PIT-Radwar 35mm OSU-35K close-in weapon system; 2 × ZM Tarnów 12.7 mm ZSMU A3B remote-controlled weapon station; 2 × ZM Tarnów 12.7 mm WKM-Bm machine guns; 16 × Kongsberg NSM anti-ship missiles; 2 × B515/2V launchers for 324 mm ASW torpedoes
- Notes: 2 boat bays for up to 7.5m RHIBs; 2 boat bays for up to 11m RHIBs or USVs/UUVs

On 16 August 2023, a steel-cutting ceremony took place for the first of the Wicher-class frigates, ORP Wicher. The ceremony was held at PGZ Stocznia Wojenna in Gdynia.

Also on 16 August 2023, it was announced that PGZ and Babcock signed an agreement including an option to build five more units. If exercised, this would result in at total of eight Wicher-class vessels being procured by Poland.

At the MSPO 2024 defense expo, it was announced that the Wicher-class frigates will be fitted with Kongsberg's NSM anti-ship missiles instead of Saab's RBS 15 Mk3.

On 9 May 2025, Polish shipbuilder PGZ cut the first steel to be used in the construction of the second Wicher-class frigate ordered by the Polish Navy.

== Ships of the class ==
The Royal Navy's five ships will be known as the "Inspiration class". In May 2021, the names of the five Type 31 ships were announced by the First Sea Lord; these were selected to represent key themes of the future plans of the Royal Navy and Royal Marines:

- Active, named after the Type 21 frigate which served in the Falklands War and in support of Britain's Overseas Territories, symbolising forward deployment of ships overseas.
- Bulldog, named after the World War II B-class destroyer HMS Bulldog, which escorted shipping convoys in the Atlantic, was chosen to represent operations in the North Atlantic. Bulldog captured the German submarine U-110 and its top-secret Enigma machine.
- Formidable, named after the World War II-era aircraft carrier HMS Formidable, represents carrier operations. Formidable took part in the war in the Mediterranean, Atlantic and Pacific.
- Venturer, named after the World War II submarine HMS Venturer, which while underwater, destroyed an enemy submarine, symbolising technology and innovation.
- Campbeltown, named after HMS Campbeltown, which was involved in the daring St Nazaire raid was chosen to symbolise the Future Commando Force.

As of 2021, all ships were planned to be service by February 2030, though by mid-2024, that plan had slipped by at least a few months. As of 2026, the in-service dates for all ships of the class had moved considerably to the right, with the lead vessel then anticipated for service entry "by the end of the decade", though uncertainty remained even about that projection. In October 2026, the shipbuilder Babcock indicated that the first ship was planned for delivery to the navy in 2028. Italics indicate estimated date.

Name	Pennant No.	Builder	Ordered	First steel cut	Laid down	Launched	Commissioned	Status
Royal Navy
Venturer	F12	Babcock International, Rosyth	15 November 2019	23 September 2021	26 April 2022	14 June 2025	Projected by 2028/29	Fitting out
Active	F08	Babcock International, Rosyth	15 November 2019	24 January 2023	16 September 2023	21 March 2026		Fitting out
Formidable	F11	Babcock International, Rosyth	15 November 2019	9 October 2024	9 December 2025			Under construction
Bulldog	F09	Babcock International, Rosyth	15 November 2019	24 February 2026				Under construction
Campbeltown	F10	Babcock International, Rosyth	15 November 2019					Announced
Indonesian Navy (Red White frigate)
Balaputradewa	322	PAL Indonesia, Surabaya Babcock International, Rosyth	30 April 2020	9 December 2022	25 August 2023	18 December 2025	Projected 2028/2029	Fitting out
TBC		PAL Indonesia, Surabaya Babcock International, Rosyth	30 April 2020	5 June 2024	15 November 2024		Projected 2028/2029	Under construction
TBC		PAL Indonesia, Surabaya Babcock International, Rosyth	21 January 2026					Announced
TBC		PAL Indonesia, Surabaya Babcock International, Rosyth	21 January 2026					Announced
Polish Navy
Wicher (Gale)		PGZ Stocznia Wojenna, Gdynia Babcock International, Rosyth	4 March 2022	16 August 2023	31 January 2024	13 August 2026	Projected 2029	Fitting out
Burza (Storm)		PGZ Stocznia Wojenna, Gdynia Babcock International, Rosyth	4 March 2022	5 May 2025	18 December 2025		Projected 2030	Under construction
Huragan (Hurricane)		PGZ Stocznia Wojenna, Gdynia Babcock International, Rosyth	4 March 2022	28 April 2026			Projected 2031	Under construction

== See also ==
- Future of the Royal Navy
- Type 26 frigate – Frigate class being built for the Royal Navy, Larger vessel for anti-submarine warfare (ASW)

Equivalent modern general purpose frigates

- Thaon di Revel-class offshore patrol vessel – (Italy) Officially known as Multi Purpose Combat Ship (MPCS), in Full configuration, its armaments and capabilities are equivalent to frigates
- FDI-class frigates – (France)
- Mogami-class frigates – (Japan)
  - Upgraded Mogami class – (Japan)
- Tamandaré-class frigates – (Brazil)
- Formidable-class frigates – (France)
- Victory-class multirole combat vessel – (Singapore) Officially referred to as multirole combat vessels (MRCV) but capabilities are equivalent to frigates
- Pohjanmaa-class corvettes – (Finland) Officially referred to as corvettes but by displacement and capabilities de facto frigates

== Bibliography ==
- Osborne, Richard (August 2021). Osborne, Richard (ed.). "Type 31 Frigates". Warships: Marine News Supplement. 75 (8): 434–440. ISSN 0966-6958.
- Johnson, J. Howard, M (November 2022). "Type 31 Frigate: Complex Warship Design for a Dynamic Operational Environment" Proceedings of International Naval Engineering Conference (INEC) 2022 doi 10.24868/10665
- Johnson, J. Howard, M (June 2024). "From UMS to Full Autonomy; Experience from a Complex Warship Programme" Proceedings of RINA Warships 2024: Future Surface Combatants Conference
