= HMS Active (F171) =

Royal Navy frigate of the Type 21, Amazon Class

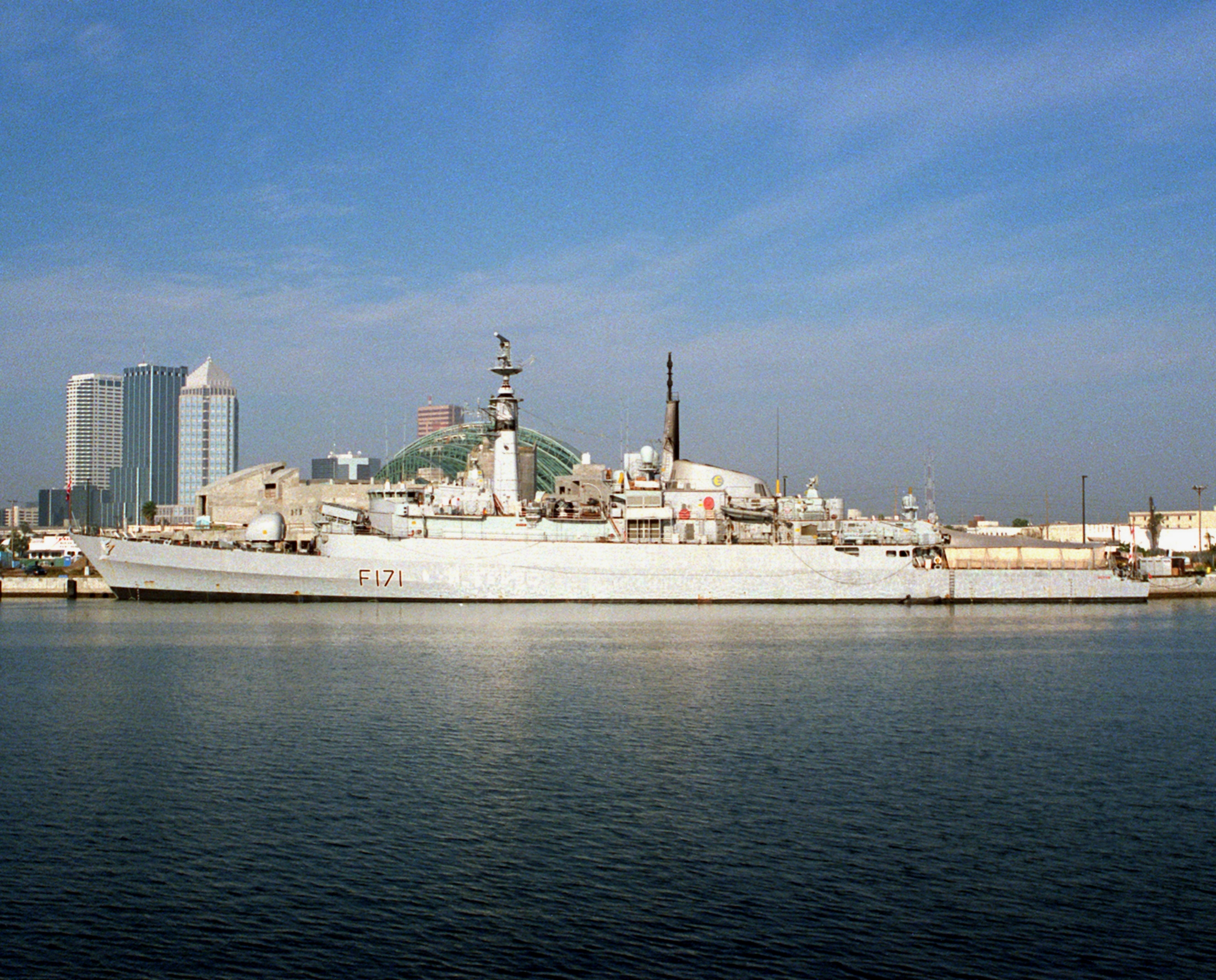
- HMS Active

History

United Kingdom
- Name: HMS Active
- Builder: Vosper Thornycroft
- Laid down: 23 July 1971
- Launched: 23 November 1972
- Commissioned: 19 July 1977
- Decommissioned: 23 September 1994
- Identification: Pennant number: F171
- Motto: Festina lente; (Latin: "Hasten slowly")
- Fate: Transferred to Pakistan Navy

Pakistan
- Name: PNS Shah Jahan
- Acquired: 23 September 1994
- Fate: Sunk as Target on 12 January 2021

General characteristics
- Class & type: Type 21 frigate
- Displacement: 3,250 tons full load
- Length: 384 ft (117 m)
- Beam: 41 ft 9 in (12.73 m)
- Draught: 19 ft 6 in (5.94 m)
- Propulsion: COGOG: 2 × Rolls-Royce Olympus gas turbines; 2 × Rolls-Royce Tyne RM1A gas turbines for cruising
- Speed: 32 knots (59 km/h; 37 mph)
- Range: 4,000 nautical miles at 17 knots (7,400 km at 31 km/h); 1,200 nautical miles at 30 knots (2,220 km at 56 km/h)
- Complement: 177
- Armament: RN: 1 × 4.5 inch (114 mm) Mark 8 naval gun; 4 × Oerlikon 20 mm cannon; 4 × MM38 Exocet missiles; 1 × quadruple Sea Cat SAMs; 2 × triple ASW torpedo tubes; 2 × Corvus chaff launchers; 1 × Type 182 towed decoy; Pakistan: 1 × 4.5 inch (114 mm) Mark 8 naval gun; 2 × Oerlikon 20 mm cannon; 1 × Phalanx CIWS; 2 × 4-cell Harpoon SSM launchers; 2 × triple STWS-1 torpedo launchers (for Mk 46 torpedoes); 2 × Mark 36 SRBOC chaff launchers; 1 × Type 182 towed decoy
- Aircraft carried: 1 × Westland Wasp helicopter, later refitted for 1 × Lynx

HMS Active was a Type 21-class frigate of the Royal Navy, built by Vosper Thornycroft at Southampton, England. She was the first of the class completed with Exocet missile launchers installed in the 'B' position, located forward of the ship’s superstructure. This upgrade significantly enhanced her anti-ship capabilities compared to earlier Type 21s, which were originally designed without missile launchers.

The class was conceived during the 1960s as a fast, lightly armed frigate, built to commercial standards to reduce costs and improve speed. Vosper Thornycroft was responsible for constructing all Type 21 frigates, with the shipyard at Southampton chosen for its expertise in producing smaller warships, enabling rapid construction and delivery.

Early in her career, Active undertook a range of peacetime duties including fleet exercises, patrols, and showing the flag missions. Her wartime service during the Falklands conflict later confirmed her value in frontline operations.

== Royal Navy service ==
Active participated in the Falklands War, sailing from HMNB Devonport on 10 May 1982 as part of the Bristol Group, joining the task force on 21 May. She formed part of the main fleet, operating to the east of the Falklands by day, escorting supply convoys to San Carlos Water, and carrying out shore bombardment by night.

On the night of 13/14 June, she shelled Argentine positions during the Battle of Mount Tumbledown. Active provided naval gunfire support on five occasions, at Bluff Cove, Fitzroy, Berkeley Sound, Mount Tumbledown, and Port Stanley.

After the war, she was fitted with an additional pair of 20mm Oerlikon cannon, one mounted on either side of her hangar, to improve her close-range air defence. These weapons were salvaged from the wreck of Ardent, reflecting a common post-conflict upgrade across the Type 21 class.

By the mid-1980s, in common with the other surviving Type 21s, Active suffered from hull cracking. During her next refit, steel plating was welded along each side of the hull to reinforce the affected areas. Modifications were also carried out to reduce hull noise.

When Hurricane Gilbert struck Jamaica and Grand Cayman in September 1988, Active, supported by the RFA Oakleaf, arrived in the area on 13 September to provide emergency relief, before departing seven days later.

== Pakistan Navy service ==
Active was decommissioned and sold to Pakistan on 23 September 1994, being renamed Shah Jahan. The Exocet missiles were not transferred, and Shah Jahan had her obsolete Sea Cat launcher removed. Signaal DA08 air search radar replaced the Type 992, while SRBOC chaff launchers and a 20mm Phalanx CIWS were fitted.

Her ship’s bell was sold on the BBC programme Bargain Hunt. Shah Jahan remained in service with the Pakistan Navy. Between 11 and 21 May 2008, she participated in Exercise Inspired Union, a multinational exercise in the North Arabian Sea. Other Pakistani warships involved included the frigate Badr, the replenishment tanker Nasr, the Pakistan Air Force explosive ordnance disposal team, and the American destroyers Curts and Ross.

Shah Jahan was sunk as a target on 12 January 2021 as part of a Pakistan Navy live-firing exercise.

== Civilian connections ==
Active was the adopted ship of the town of Burnley in Lancashire, North-West England and in 1989, the ship and her crew were granted the Freedom of the Town. Part of Burnley’s inner ring road, between Westgate and the Church Street junction with Colne Road, is named Active Way in her honour and one of Active’s anchors is displayed at the Anchor Retail Park.

== Publications ==
- Colledge, J. J.; Warlow, Ben (2006) [1969]. Ships of the Royal Navy: The Complete Record of All Fighting Ships of the Royal Navy from the 15th Century to the Present (3rd Rev ed.). London: Chatham Publishing. ISBN 978-1-86176-281-8. OCLC 67375475.
- Marriott, Leo (1983). Royal Navy Frigates 1945–1983. Shepperton, UK: Ian Allan. ISBN 0-7110-1322-5.
