= List of warships of the Scots Navy =

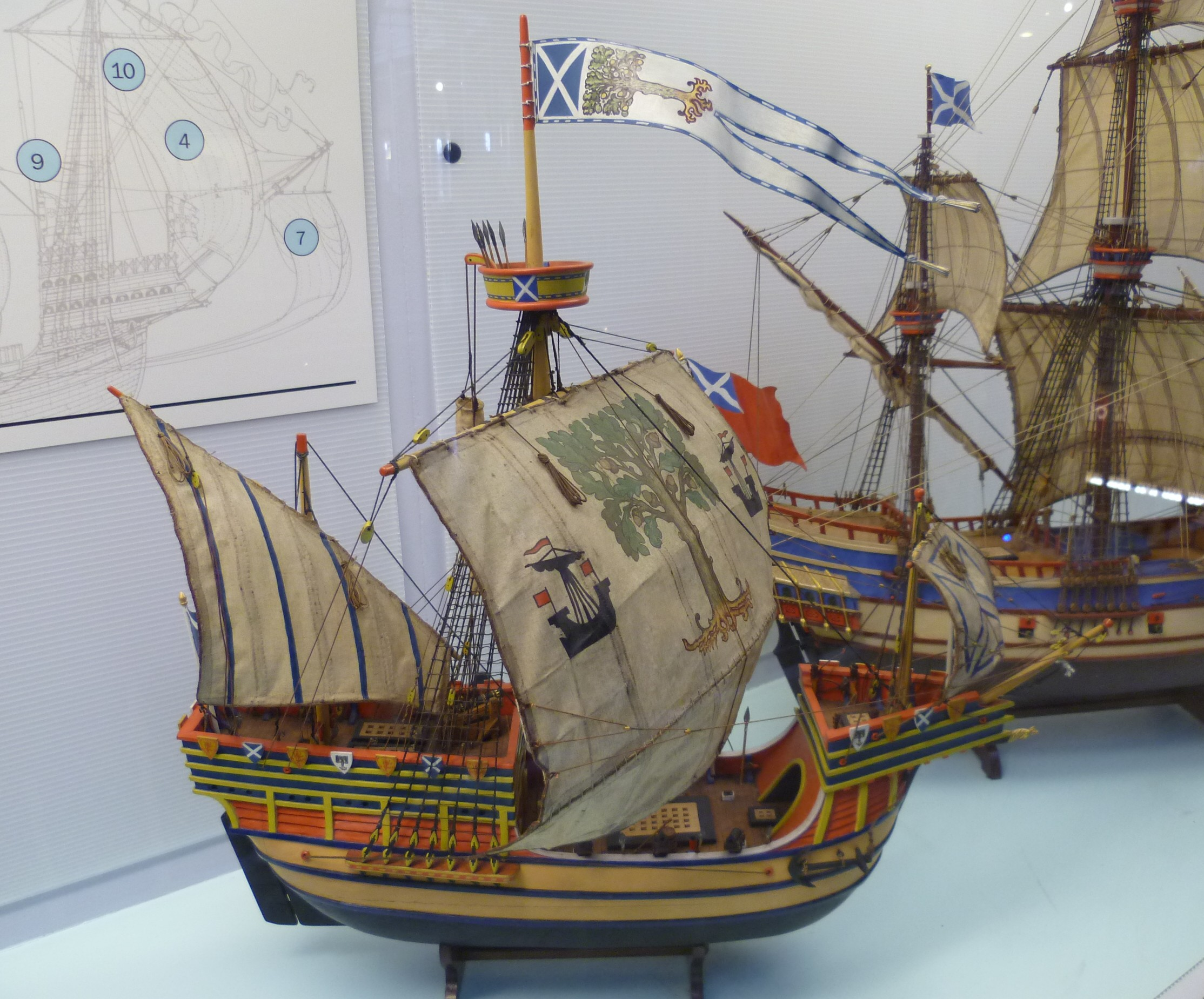
Model of the Yellow Carvel (1475)

This is a list of warships of the Royal Scots Navy, the navy of the Kingdom of Scotland prior to the Acts of Union 1707. For its continuation after this period, see List of ship names of the Royal Navy.

== Ships ==
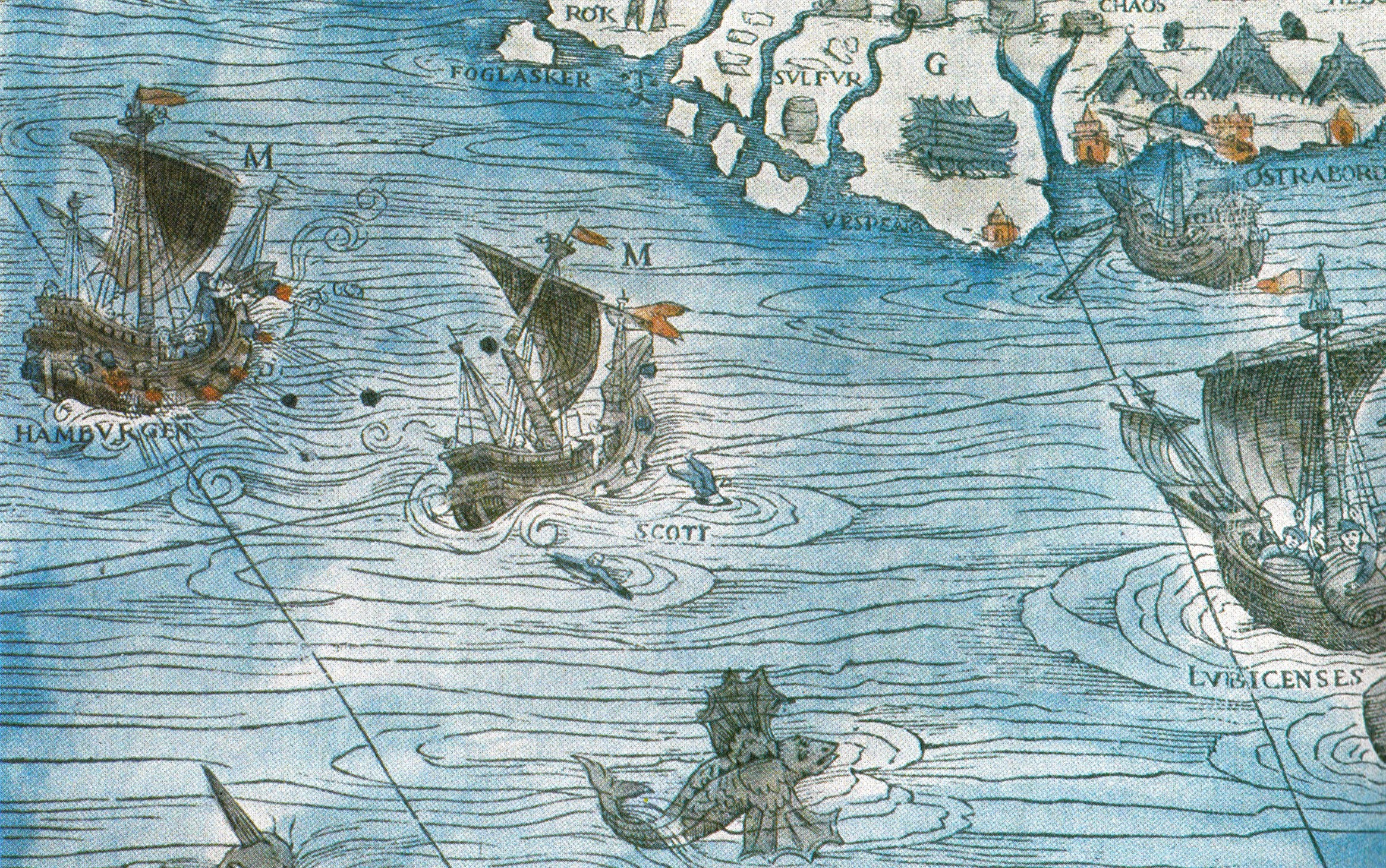
A Scottish armed merchantman engaged in the Baltic trade is attacked by a Hanseatic ship. Detail from a 16th-century map.

- unnamed man-of-war c1329
- King's Carvel (Yellow Carvel) 1475
- Flower 1470s
- Christopher 1490s - man-of-war
- Lion early 16th century converted merchant vessel owned by Robert Barton of Over Barnton
- Jenny Pirwin early 16th century
- Eagle (1502)
- Towaich (1502)
- Colomb (1504) - hired by Robert Barton
- Treasurer (1504) - a converted merchant vessel likely named for Robert Barton, who was Treasurer of Scotland and responsible for commissioning the vessel
- Margaret (1505) - named after Margaret Tudor
- Unicorn (1505)
- James (1511)
- Michael (Great Michael) (1511); a 1000-ton Carrack sold to France 1514 - named after archangel Michael
- Mary Willoughby c. 1535, captured from the English, and used in the Scots Navy until she was recaptured. Named after Maria Willoughby, friend of Catherine of Aragon and wife of reigning monarch Henry VIII of England
- Salamander of Leith, 1537, Flagship of James V of Scotland, gift of Francis I of France
- Lamb of Glasgow 1690 - converted merchant ship
- Pelican (hired 1689) 18 guns ship captured by the French 10 July 1689; re-captured 1690 by the English Navy and renamed Pelican Prize (as fireship), sunk as breakwater in 1692 off Sheerness.
- Janet (hired 1689) 12 guns ship captured by the French 10 July 1689; fate unknown.
- Royal William (1696) - a Fifth-rate 32-gun frigate. Flagship of Captain Thomas Gordon, Commodore of the Navy. Became HMS Edinburgh in 1707; William III
- Royal Mary (1696) - a Sixth-rate 24 gun frigate. Captain James Hamilton. Became HMS Glasgow in 1707; like named for Mary II
- Dumbarton Castle (1696) - a Sixth-rate Frigate, retained its name as HMS Dumbarton Castle in 1707

The final three ships above were added to the Royal Navy following the Act of Union in 1707.

== See also ==
- List of early warships of the English Navy
