= HMS Cardiff (F89) =

Type 26 or City class frigate for the Royal Navy

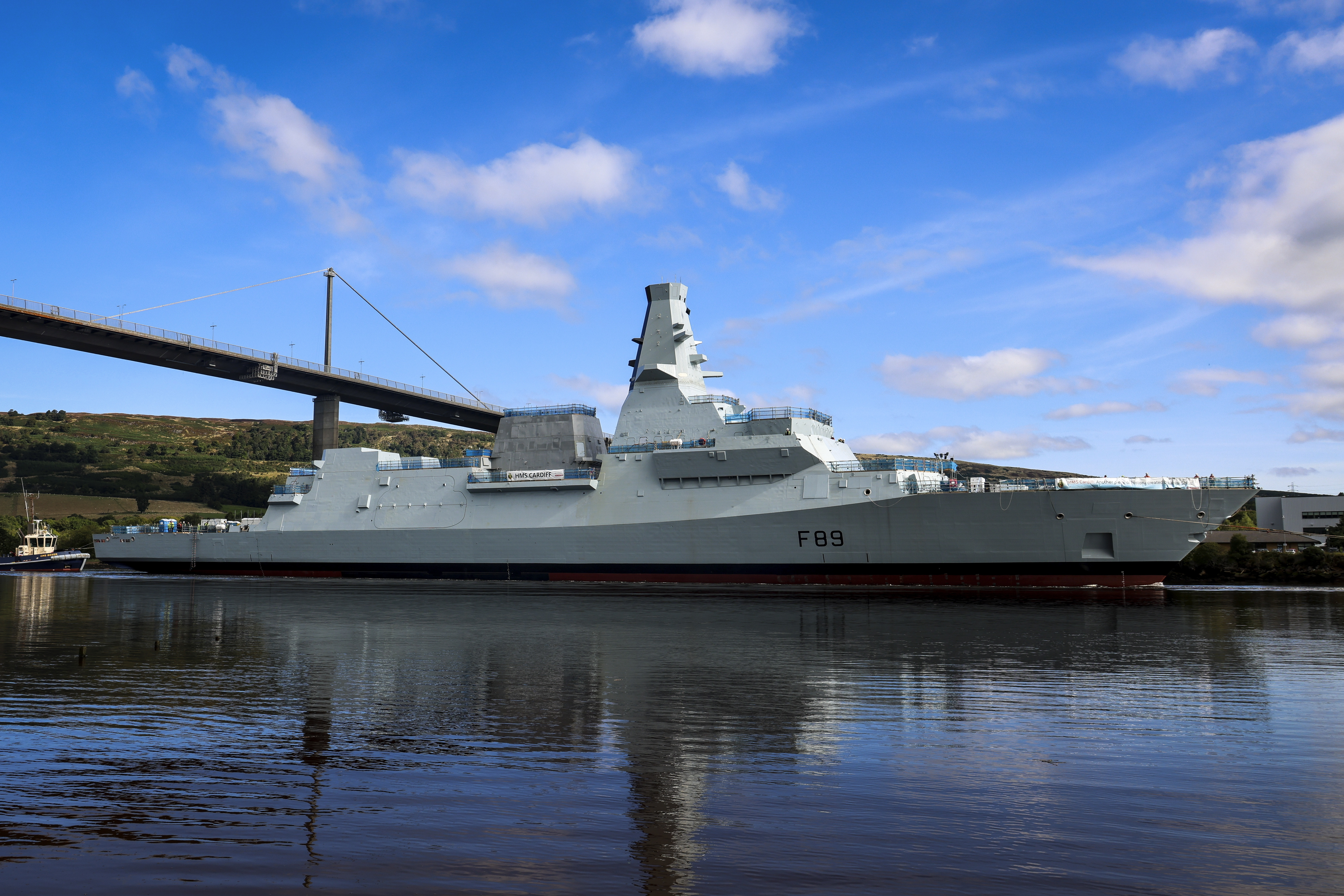
- HMS Cardiff prior to fitting out.

History

United Kingdom
- Name: HMS Cardiff
- Namesake: The city of Cardiff
- Ordered: 2 July 2017
- Builder: BAE Systems Marine
- Laid down: 14 August 2019
- Launched: 5 September 2024
- Sponsored by: Katherine Jenkins
- Commissioned: Early 2028
- Identification: Pennant number: F89
- Status: Fitting out

General characteristics
- Class & type: Type 26 frigate
- Displacement: 6,900 t (6,800 long tons), 8,000+ t full load
- Length: 149.9 m (491 ft 10 in)
- Beam: 20.8 m (68 ft 3 in)
- Propulsion: CODLOG configuration: Rolls-Royce MT30 gas turbine; Four MTU diesel generators; Two electric motors
- Speed: In excess of 26 knots (48 km/h; 30 mph)
- Range: In excess of 7,000 nmi (13,000 km; 8,100 mi) in Electric-Motor (EM) drive
- Complement: 118 (capacity for 208)
- Sensors & processing systems: Type 997 Artisan 3D radar; Kelvin Hughes Ltd SharpEye navigation radar; Sonar 2087 (towed array sonar); Ultra Electronics Type 2150 bow sonar; SCOT-5 satcom
- Electronic warfare & decoys: IRVIN-GQ DLF decoys
- Armament: Vertical launch Sea Ceptor anti-air missiles - 48 missiles in 12 quad-cells: 24-cell strike-length Mark 41 Vertical Launching System for possible: Tomahawk, ASROC and LRASM; Guns: 1 × BAE 5-inch 62-calibre Mk 45 naval gun; 2 × 30 mm DS30M Mk2 guns; 2 × Phalanx CIWS; Browning .50 caliber heavy machine guns (TBC); 4 × general purpose machine guns
- Aircraft carried: Wildcat, armed with; 4 × anti-ship missiles, or; 2 × anti-submarine torpedoes; AgustaWestland Merlin, armed with; 4 × anti-submarine torpedoes
- Aviation facilities: Accommodation for two helicopters; Large Chinook-capable flight deck; Enclosed hangar; Facilities for UAVs
- Notes: Flexible mission bay

HMS Cardiff is the second Batch 1 Type 26 frigate to be built for the United Kingdom's Royal Navy. The first steel was cut on 14 August 2019. The Type 26 class will partially replace the navy's thirteen Type 23 frigates, and will be a multi-mission warship designed for anti-submarine warfare, air defence and general purpose operations. The frigate is currently being fitted out at the BAE Systems Maritime in Glasgow, the second to enter production as part of a £3.7 billion contract for three ships announced by the MoD in 2017, preceded by her sister ship Glasgow. Belfast is to follow.

Like Glasgow, the frigate was built at the BAE Systems Maritime shipyard at Govan, then transferred onto the semi-submersible heavy-lift barge Malin Augustea CD01. On 30 August 2024, Cardiff was taken on the barge down the Clyde and up Loch Long to the Glen Mallan jetty, to be floated off the barge and enter the water for the first time. A few days later, it was taken by tugs upriver to the BAE Scotstoun shipyard for fitting out.

== Gallery ==
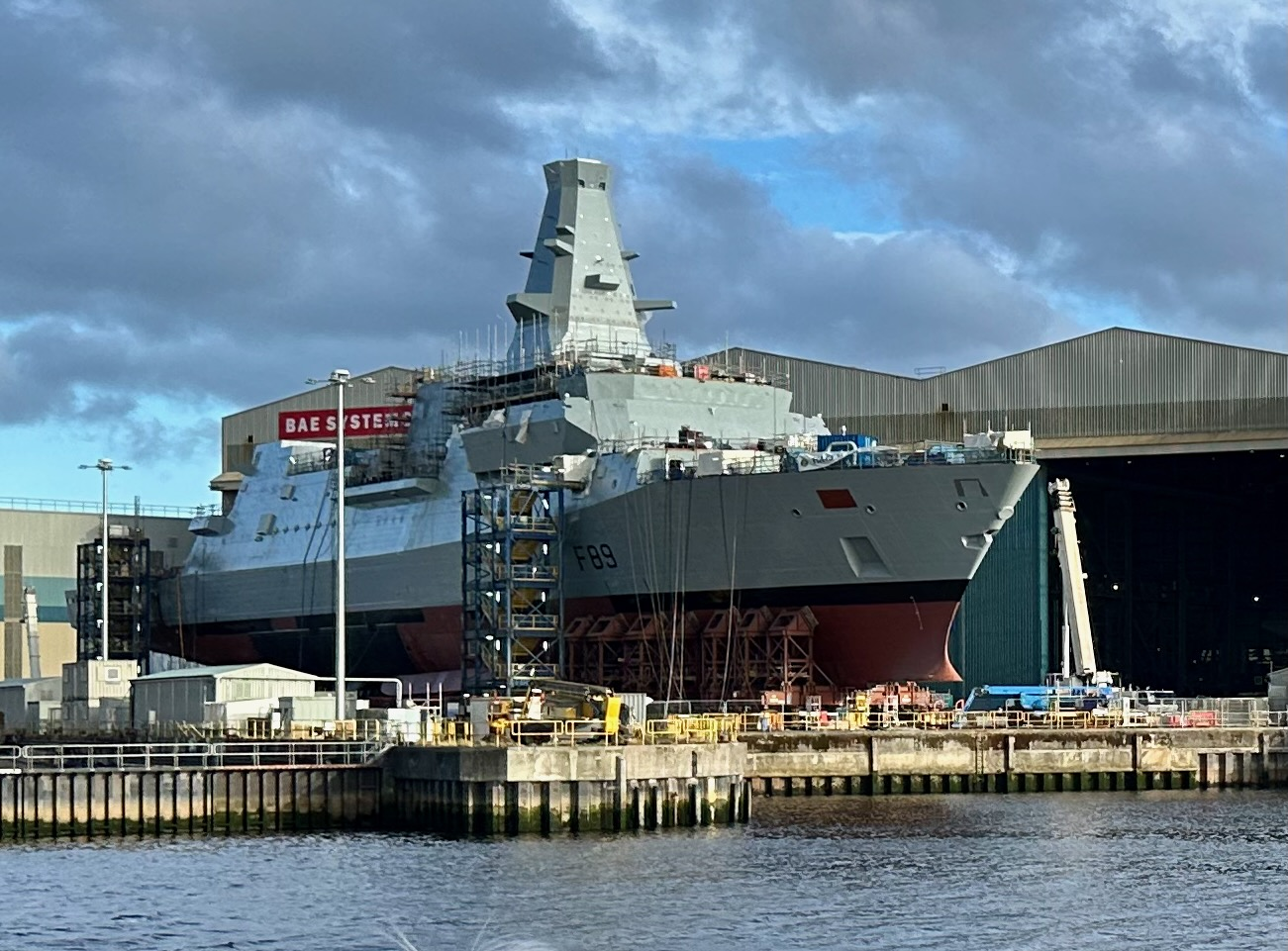
HMS Cardiff at BAE Govan, nearing launch

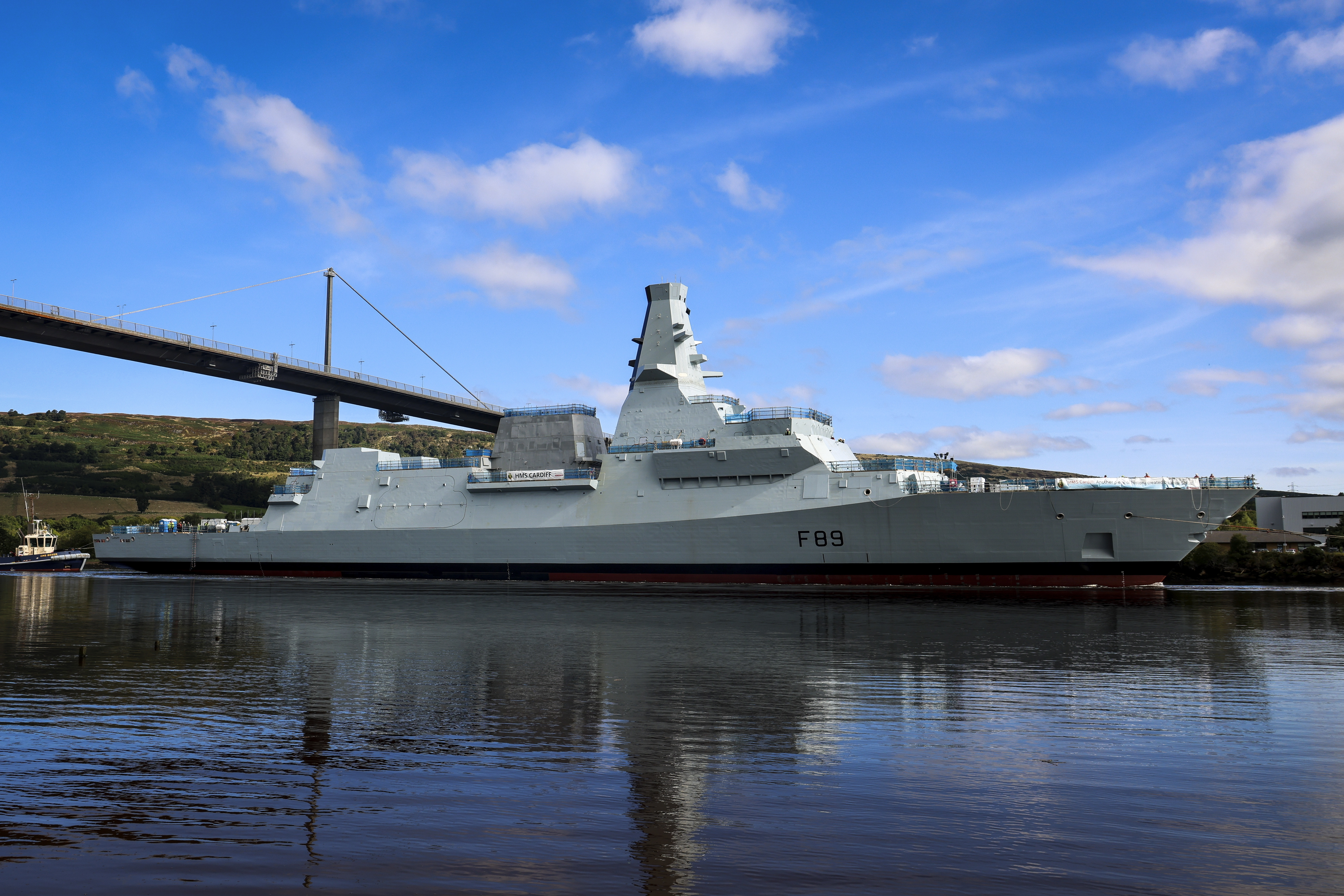
Cardiff being floated along the River Clyde during the move from Govan to Scotstoun
