= HMS Glasgow =

Nine ships of the Royal Navy have been named HMS Glasgow after the Scottish city of Glasgow:

- The first HMS Glasgow (1707) was a 20-gun sixth rate, previously the Scottish ship Royal Mary. She was transferred to the Royal Navy in 1707 and was sold in 1719.
- The second HMS Glasgow (1745) was a 24-gun sixth rate launched in 1745 and sold in 1756.
- The third HMS Glasgow (1757) was a 20-gun sixth rate launched in 1757 and accidentally burnt in 1779.
- The fourth HMS Glasgow (1814) was a 40-gun fifth-rate Endymion-class frigate launched in 1814 and broken up by 1829.
- The fifth HMS Glasgow (1861) was a wooden screw frigate launched in 1861 and sold in 1884.
- The sixth HMS Glasgow (1909) was a Town-class light cruiser launched in 1909 and sold in 1927.
- The seventh HMS Glasgow (C21) was a Town-class light cruiser launched in 1936 and scrapped in 1958.
- The eighth HMS Glasgow (D88) was a Type 42 destroyer launched in 1976. She was decommissioned in 2005 and scrapped in 2009.
- The ninth HMS Glasgow (F88) is lead ship of the Royal Navy's Type 26 frigates, to be operational in 2027.

== Battle honours ==
- Lagos 1759
- Havana 1762
- Algiers 1816
- Navarino 1827
- Coronel 1914
- Falkland Islands 1914
- Norway 1940
- Arctic 1943
- Biscay 1943
- Normandy 1944
- Falkland Islands 1982

== See also ==
- HHS Glasgow was the royal yacht of the Sultan of Zanzibar, built in 1873 in the style of the 1861 HMS Glasgow and sunk in 1896
