= List of ships named HMS Belfast =

Two ships of the Royal Navy have been named HMS Belfast after the capital city of Northern Ireland:

- The first HMS Belfast is a Town-class light cruiser launched in 1938 preserved as a museum ship in London.
- The second HMS Belfast will be the third planned Type 26 frigate.

== Battle honours ==
- Arctic 1943
- North Cape 1943
- Normandy 1944
- Korea 1950–52
