= F89 =

F89 or F-89 may refer to:

- Aradu (F89), a 1980 Nigerian frigate
- DKW F89, a 1950 compact front wheel drive saloon
- F89 Minimi, an Australian produced version of the FN Minimi light machine gun
- F89 strain, a mupirocin-resistant strain of Staphylococcus aureus
- HMCS Prince David (F89), a 1929 Canadian National Steamships passenger liner
- Royal Navy pennant numbers:
  - HMS Battleaxe (F89), a 1977 Type 22 frigate
  - HMS Cardiff (F89), a Type 26 frigate
- Northrop F-89 Scorpion, an early American jet-powered fighter
- Reynard F89 from Reynard Motorsport
- Volvo F89, heavy-duty truck from Volvo
