= River-class destroyer (2030s) =

Royal Canadian Navy warship program

- A rendering of the River-class destroyer

Class overview
- Name: River class
- Builders: Irving Shipbuilding
- Operators: Royal Canadian Navy
- Preceded by: Halifax-class frigate; Iroquois-class destroyer
- Cost: Acquisition for 15 ships (construction, weapons, ammunition and spares included): $77.3 billion
- Built: 2025–2050
- In service: From early 2030s
- Planned: 15
- On order: 2
- Building: 1

General characteristics
- Type: Guided missile destroyer
- Displacement: 8,080 t (7,950 long tons) (standard)
- Length: 151.4 m (496 ft 9 in)
- Beam: 20.75 m (68 ft 1 in)
- Draught: 8 m (26 ft 3 in)
- Propulsion: CODLOG: 2 × General Electric electric motors; 1 × Rolls-Royce MT30 gas turbine; 4 × Rolls-Royce MTU Type 20V 4000 M53B high-speed diesel generators; L3Harris Integrated Platform Management System
- Speed: 27 knots (50 km/h; 31 mph)
- Range: 7,000 nmi (13,000 km; 8,100 mi)
- Complement: 210
- Sensors & processing systems: Command and control; Aegis Combat System with Canadian Tactical Interface; USN Cooperative Engagement Capability (sensor netting); Integrated Cyber Defence System; OSI Maritime Systems Integrated Bridge and Navigation System; L3Harris Internal and External Communication Suite; Surveillance & weapon sensors; Lockheed Martin Canada AN/SPY-7(V)3 Solid State 3D AESA radar; MDA Solid State AESA target illuminator; X & S band navigation radars; L3Harris WESCAM electro-optical and infrared systems (SPEIR); Underwater warfare systems; Towed sonar: Thales Group S2087/CAPTAS-4; Hull-mounted sonar: Ultra Electronics Sonar S2150
- Electronic warfare & decoys: Raytheon AN/SLQ-32(V)6 electronic warfare suite; SIGINT - Southwest Research Institute (SwRI) - SRD-506 (StrongBow); Lockheed Martin - Off-board Electronic Attack - LEED; Ultra Electronics SEA SENTOR S21700 towed torpedo countermeasures; General Dynamics Sonobuoy Processing System; Expendable Acoustic Countermeasures
- Armament: Missiles; 2 × quad box launchers: 8 × Naval Strike Missile; Close-in air defence system; RIM-116 block II launch from a 1 × 21-cell Mk-144 GML; 1 × 24-cell Mk 41 VLS: RIM-162 ESSM Block II (quad-packed); RIM-66 SM-2 Block IIIC; BGM-109 Block V; Torpedoes; 2 × twin 324 mm (13 in) torpedo tubes (auto-loaded): Mk 54 Lightweight Torpedo; Guns; 1 × BAE 5-inch/54-caliber Mark 45 naval gun; 2 × Mk 38 Mod 4 30 mm (1.2 in) autocannons; 11 × 7.62 mm (0.300 in) C6 FLEX or 12.7 mm (0.50 in) M2 machine guns
- Aircraft carried: Helicopters; 1 × CH-148 Cyclone armed with: 2 × Mk 54 Lightweight Torpedo; 1 × C6 FLEX 7.62 mm (0.300 in) general-purpose machine gun
- Aviation facilities: Indal Technologies ASIST; Large Chinook-capable flight deck; Enclosed hangar; Facilities for UAVs
- Notes: Flexible mission bay; Rolls-Royce Mission Bay Handling System; Modular mission support capacity for sea containers and vehicles; 2 × 9–12 m (30–39 ft) multi-role boats; 1 × 9 m rescue boat

The River-class destroyer, formerly the Canadian Surface Combatant (CSC), and Single Class Surface Combatant Project is the procurement project that will replace the Iroquois and Halifax-class warships with up to 15 new ships beginning in the early 2030s as part of the National Shipbuilding Procurement Strategy.

At approximately 8,000 tonnes (7,900 long tons), the replacement vessels will have almost double the displacement of the existing Halifax-class frigates, and provide a wide-area air defence capability, anti-submarine, and anti-ship warfare capability. In 2017, a new defence policy framework, entitled Strong, Secure and Engaged, was unveiled which promised significantly greater resources for the Surface Combatant Project – in the range of $60 billion. By 2021, the Parliamentary Budget Officer estimated the cost for the program of 15 Type 26 ships as $77.3 billion, "rising to $79.7 billion if there is a one-year delay in the start of construction and $82.1 billion if there is a two-year delay".

On 19 October 2018, the Type 26 was selected as the "preferred design", and the government entered "into negotiations with the winning bidder to confirm it can deliver everything promised in the complex proposal." On 8 February 2019, the Canadian government signed the $60 billion contract with the winning bidders.

As of 2026, early construction of the first three ships is underway.

== History ==
The Single Class Surface Combatant Project is a naval procurement program for the Royal Canadian Navy created to replace the aging Iroquois-class anti-air warfare destroyers and Halifax-class multi-role frigates. The Iroquois and Halifax ships have come to the end or are nearing the end of their service lives and require replacement. The Iroquois class was originally scheduled for retirement around 2010 after 40 years in service; the ships were then expected to have their service lives extended until replacements were commissioned. However, all four have been decommissioned, the last being HMCS Athabaskan in March 2017. The Halifax class is projected to end their service lives in the 2020s.

The navy had investigated adopting the active phased array radar (APAR), leading observers to suggest that APAR and the associated SMART-L would equip the Single-Class Surface Combatant or upgraded Halifax-class ships during the Frigate Equipment Life Extension (FELEX) project. Upgrades to the existing Halifax class with such a system would likely be difficult since the APAR requires its own mast and might make the Halifax-class design top-heavy.

In the 2010 Canadian National Shipbuilding Procurement Strategy, $26 billion was planned for the construction of the 15 vessels of the Single Class Surface Combatant Project. The first ships were slated to become available in 2026. The initial plan called for separate bids for design and integration of systems aboard the vessels. The government later investigated merging those bids.

On 26 October 2012, a letter of interest was published by Public Works and Government Services Canada to announce a session in which interested firms could find out the needs of DND for the new class and the project in general. The closing date was 5 November 2012. On 20 January 2015, Irving Shipbuilding was named the prime contractor for the program. The role of the lead contractor gave Irving Shipbuilding overall control of the project, and the company had already won the right to build the vessels at its yard in Halifax, Nova Scotia. This led to questions concerning the bidding process and the awarding of the contracts. In fall 2015, high increases in costs were reported, more than doubling to $30 billion from $14 billion for the new warships. The total cost of the naval ship building program rose from $26.2 billion to $42 billion in a study. This put in jeopardy the number of ships that could be produced and raised the prospect of ships with reduced capabilities.

In November 2015, seven companies pre-qualified for the combat systems integrator role. Atlas Elektronik, DCNS, Lockheed Martin Canada, Saab Australia, Selex ES, Thales Nederland and ThyssenKrupp Marine Systems Canada all made the shortlist. For the warship designer role, the following companies were pre-qualified: Alion-JJMA, BAE Systems, DCNS, Fincantieri, Navantia, Odense Maritime Technology and ThyssenKrupp Marine Systems Canada.

On 13 June 2016, Minister of Public Services and Procurement Judy Foote announced that the government would buy and modify an off-the-shelf design for the new warships, instead of designing them from scratch. The minister said a competitive bid for an existing design would knock about two years off the process and save money. The nearly $2 billion saving in research and development costs would allow for more ships to be built and the integration of more advanced technology with increased capability, over the long term.

It was originally anticipated that two CSC ship variants would have been acquired to replace the specific capabilities of the Iroquois-class destroyers and Halifax-class frigates. As originally intended, both variants would have the necessary combat capabilities to operate in air, surface and subsurface threat environments. A small number of ships (up to five) would have additionally incorporated the sensors, guided weapons and command and fire control facilities necessary to perform large-area air defence, along with having the facilities to be task force flagships. The remaining ships would have replaced the capabilities provided by the fleet of Halifax-class frigates as a more general purpose/antisubmarine warfare variant. However, only one variant will be acquired due to cost effectiveness, crew training efficiencies, and being better suited to the navy's operational needs.

On 20 October 2020, Alan Williams (former Assistant Deputy Minister, Supply Operations Service in Public Works and Government Services Canada, and former Assistant Deputy Minister of Materiel at the Department of National Defence) released a paper examining the estimated life-cycle costs of Canada's Canadian Surface Combatants. Williams estimated that acquisition, operating and supporting the Canadian Surface Combatants throughout their life-cycle of approximately 30 years will cost between $213.5 billion and $219.6 billion. Approximately two-thirds of these costs are attributable to the long-term operations and support (O&S) costs of the CSC.

This report caught the attention of the House of Commons Standing Committee on Government Operations and Estimates. Additionally, the National Shipbuilding Strategy was set to have a planned Auditor General review in early 2021. This level of watchdog review and spiralling cost estimates drew parallels to Canada's acquisition of F-35 Lightning II fighter jets.

On 14 February 2025, a news article by David Pugliese presented concerns raised by defence industry officials that a Canadian-made command management system was not being installed as promised by Lockheed Martin Canada, raising concerns that upgrades and modifications to the ship would have to be accepted by the US government.

== Bids ==
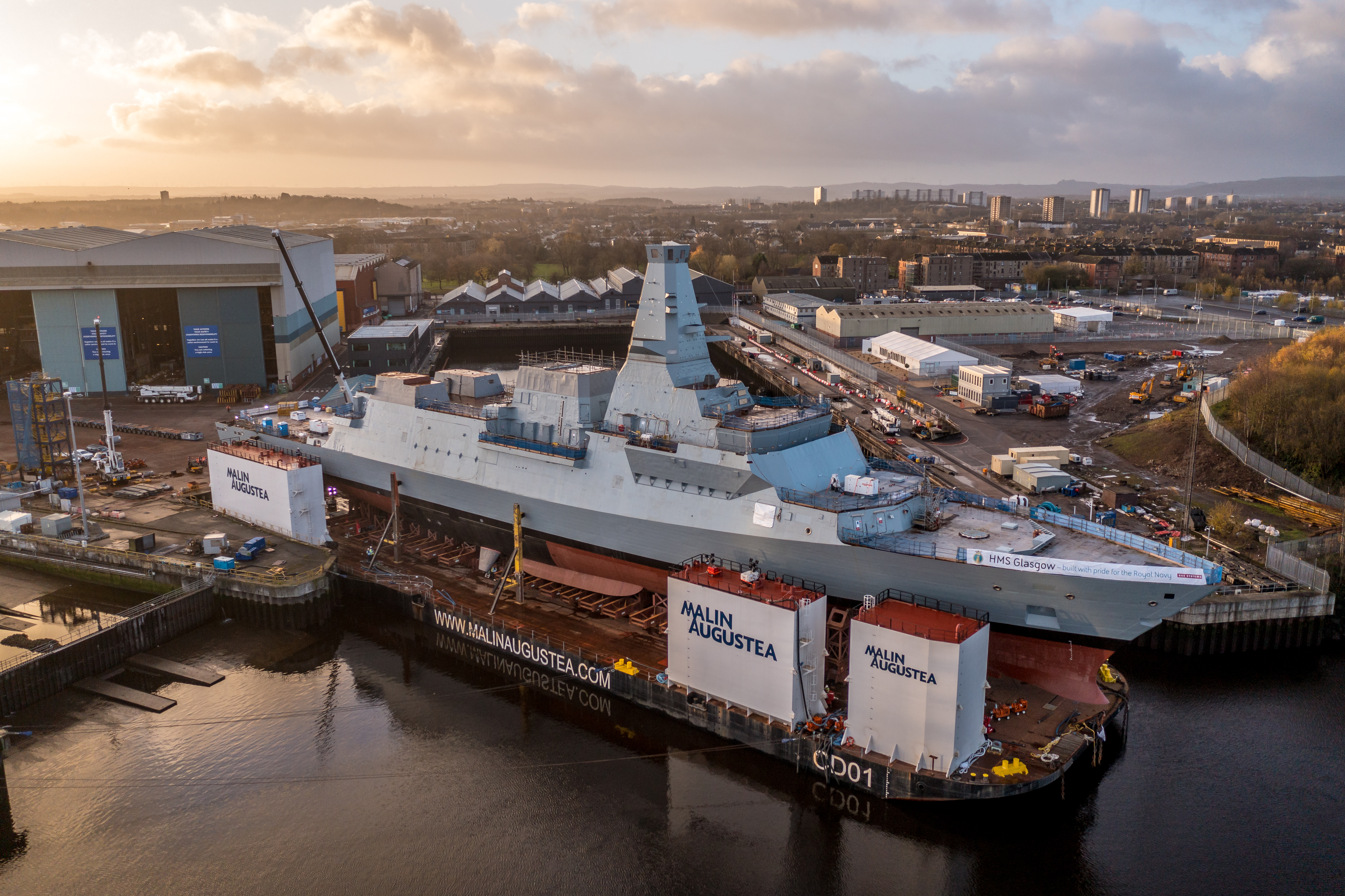
The first Type 26 frigate, HMS Glasgow, under construction in Govan, November 2022

In October 2016, it was reported that twelve bidders had been asked to submit their designs by 27 April 2017. Foote announced that only designs from ships already in service or mature existing designs would be part of the process. However, concerns were raised when it was revealed that BAE Systems would be expected to submit its Type 26 frigate for consideration even though it had not yet been built. Delays in the bidding process were announced by the government in February 2017 after a third of the entrants requested more time to compile a bid. Bids were to be submitted by 22 June with a winner expected to be declared in Fall 2017. Further delay in the bidding process arose due to the Government of Canada's demand that any intellectual property associated with the vessel be transferred upon purchase. This led to a diplomatic exchange and one of the bidders' nations to demand direct negotiations between governments. The selection of the design was pushed to Spring 2018. The deadline for bids was first extended to 17 November, then again to 30 November 2017.

On 28 November 2017, BAE Systems along with its partners Lockheed Martin Canada; CAE Inc.; L3 Technologies; MacDonald, Dettwiler and Associates; and Ultra Electronics, officially submitted their Type 26 warship design proposal for the project. A joint bid by Fincantieri and Naval Group for their FREMM multipurpose frigate was offered informally on 6 November, directly to the National Defence Minister, Harjit Sajjan, which he did not accept. Fincantieri and Naval Group de facto withdrew from the process by not making a formal bid by 30 November 2017 deadline. The companies' fixed price offer of $20.9 billion was lower than the other bids. However, unlike the other bids, this price excluded the cost of design, infrastructure, spare parts, training, ammunition, contingencies and project management. The unsolicited bid was rejected because it came outside of the official bidding process. However, on 8 December 2017, Naval Group/Fincantieri announced they would continue to submit and support their unsolicited bid, with letters of project endorsement and promised long-term support from French Defence Minister Florence Parly and Italian Defence Minister Roberta Pinotti. Naval Group and Fincantieri said they could begin construction at Irving as early as 2019. It was also alleged that due to concerns over possible fairness of the bidding process, two European shipbuilders declined to submit bids.

=== Confirmed contenders ===
- Alion-JJMA – De Zeven Provinciën–class frigate
- BAE Systems – Type 26 frigate
- Navantia – F-105 frigate

=== Selected and rejected bids ===
- Naval Group/Fincantieri – FREMM-ER multipurpose frigate (rejected)

In October 2018, the group led by BAE Systems and Lockheed Martin Canada and offering the Type 26, was selected as the preferred design. However, after Alion Canada, one of the failed bidders, began litigation in November 2018, the government was ordered to postpone any discussion of contracts until the investigation by the Canadian International Trade Tribunal was complete. The Trade Tribunal dismissed the complaint for lack of standing on 31 January 2019, Alion appealed the decision to Federal Court, but discontinued its challenge in November 2019.

In February 2019, the design and design team were determined and corresponding contracts were awarded.

== Construction ==
Given the need to fully develop the Canadian design, tool up the shipyard, and first complete the preceding eight-vessel Arctic Offshore Patrol Ship project, the envisaged start date for construction was in 2025 with the first vessel to enter service in the early 2030s.

On 28 June 2024, construction on the production test module began at Irving Shipbuilding and the names of the first 3 ships were announced. This module will be used to test and streamline building processes. The lessons learned from this process would then be applied in order to enable the start of full-rate production, which began in April 2025. A keel-laying ceremony for the first River-class destroyer, the future HMCS Fraser, followed in June 2026. Delivery of the first ship is expected in the early 2030s, with the first nine ships projected to be built by 2040. The final ship, of a projected total of 15 destroyers, is expected to be delivered by 2050.

As of March 2025, Irving Shipbuilding Inc. has received multiple contracts totaling $12.87 billion for the construction of the ships. The contract for batch one of the ships totaled $8 billion, including taxes, and as of June 2025 the Canadian government spent approximately $4.92 billion of the contract values.

== Ships ==
=== List of ships ===
Builder	Order (date)	Status	Name	No.	Steel cut	Laid down	Launched	Comm.	Namesake	Notes
(Canada); Irving Shipbuilding Inc.	Batch 1; 3 Mar 2025	In construction	Fraser	DDGH 1	28 Jun 2024	12 Jun 2026	–	Early 2030s	Fraser River	3 ordered, full-rate production started the 25 Apr 2025.
(Canada); Irving Shipbuilding Inc.	Batch 1; 3 Mar 2025	On order	Saint-Laurent	DDGH 2	–	–	–	–	St. Lawrence River	3 ordered, full-rate production started the 25 Apr 2025.
(Canada); Irving Shipbuilding Inc.	Batch 1; 3 Mar 2025	On order	Mackenzie	DDGH 3	–	–	–	–	Mackenzie River	3 ordered, full-rate production started the 25 Apr 2025.
(Canada); Irving Shipbuilding Inc.	Batch 2 No order yet	Planned	–	–	–	–	–	–		Total of 15 destroyers planned.
(Canada); Irving Shipbuilding Inc.	Batch 2 No order yet	Planned	–	–	–	–	–	–		Total of 15 destroyers planned.
(Canada); Irving Shipbuilding Inc.	Batch 2 No order yet	Planned	–	–	–	–	–	–		Total of 15 destroyers planned.
(Canada); Irving Shipbuilding Inc.	Batch 2 No order yet	Planned	–	–	–	–	–	–		Total of 15 destroyers planned.
(Canada); Irving Shipbuilding Inc.	Batch 2 No order yet	Planned	–	–	–	–	–	–		Total of 15 destroyers planned.
(Canada); Irving Shipbuilding Inc.	Batch 2 No order yet	Planned	–	–	–	–	–	–		Total of 15 destroyers planned.
(Canada); Irving Shipbuilding Inc.	Batch 2 No order yet	Planned	–	–	–	–	–	–		Total of 15 destroyers planned.
(Canada); Irving Shipbuilding Inc.	Batch 2 No order yet	Planned	–	–	–	–	–	–		Total of 15 destroyers planned.
(Canada); Irving Shipbuilding Inc.	Batch 2 No order yet	Planned	–	–	–	–	–	–		Total of 15 destroyers planned.
(Canada); Irving Shipbuilding Inc.	Batch 2 No order yet	Planned	–	–	–	–	–	–		Total of 15 destroyers planned.
(Canada); Irving Shipbuilding Inc.	Batch 2 No order yet	Planned	–	–	–	–	–	–		Total of 15 destroyers planned.
(Canada); Irving Shipbuilding Inc.	Batch 2 No order yet	Planned	–	–	–	–	–	2050		Total of 15 destroyers planned.

Planned / expected dates
