= HMS Glasgow (F88) =

Type 26 frigate currently under construction for the Royal Navy

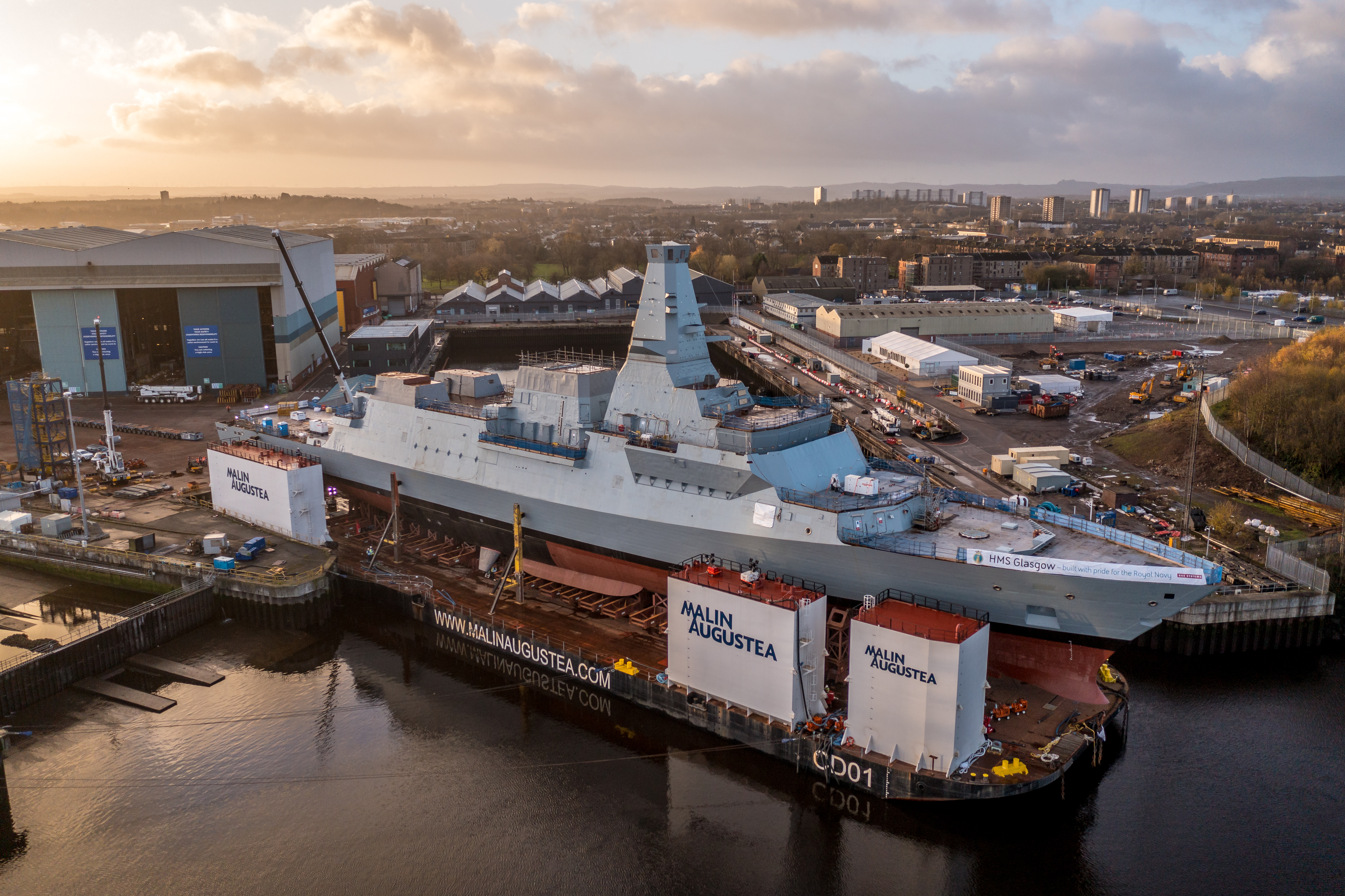
- Glasgow ready for launch in November 2022

History

United Kingdom
- Name: HMS Glasgow
- Namesake: The city of Glasgow
- Ordered: 2 July 2017
- Builder: BAE Systems Marine
- Laid down: 20 July 2017
- Launched: 3 December 2022
- Sponsored by: The Princess of Wales
- Home port: HMNB Devonport
- Identification: F88
- Status: Fitting out

General characteristics
- Type: Type 26 frigate
- Displacement: 6,900 t (6,800 long tons), 8,000+ t full load
- Length: 149.9 m (492 ft)
- Beam: 20.8 m (68 ft 3 in)
- Propulsion: CODLOG configuration: Rolls-Royce MT30 gas turbine; 4 × MTU diesel generators; 2 × electric motors
- Speed: In excess of 26 knots (48 km/h; 30 mph)
- Range: In excess of 7,000 nmi (13,000 km; 8,100 mi) in diesel-electric drive
- Complement: 118 (capacity for 208)
- Sensors & processing systems: Type 997 Artisan 3D radar; Kelvin Hughes Ltd SharpEye navigation radar; Sonar 2087 (towed array sonar); Ultra Electronics Type 2150 bow sonar; SCOT-5 satcom
- Electronic warfare & decoys: IRVIN-GQ DLF decoys
- Armament: Missiles : 48-cell VLS Sea Ceptor anti-air missiles; 24-cell Mark 41 VLS for: Tomahawk, ASROC and anti-ship missiles; Guns: 1 × 5-inch 62-calibre Mk 45 naval gun; 2 × 30 mm DS30M Mk2 guns; 2 × Phalanx CIWS; Browning .50 caliber heavy machine guns (TBC); 4 × general purpose machine guns
- Aircraft carried: Wildcat, armed with; 4 × anti-ship missiles, or; 2 × anti-submarine torpedoes; AgustaWestland Merlin, armed with; 4 × anti-submarine torpedoes
- Aviation facilities: Accommodation for two helicopters: Large Chinook-capable flight deck; Enclosed hangar; Facilities for UAVs
- Notes: Flexible mission bay

HMS Glasgow is the first Type 26 frigate to be built for the United Kingdom's Royal Navy. The Type 26 class will partially replace the navy's thirteen Type 23 frigates, and will be a multi-mission warship designed to support anti-submarine warfare, air defence and general purpose operations.

== Construction ==
The ship was assembled on the River Clyde in Glasgow. The first steel was cut for Glasgow in July 2017 with the ship expected to be delivered in 2024 and operational in about 2026. However, those dates have since moved to the right. In January 2018, work started on the second hull section.

In 2020, the Royal Navy announced that the ship was more than halfway through construction and that work on the final section of Glasgow has started.

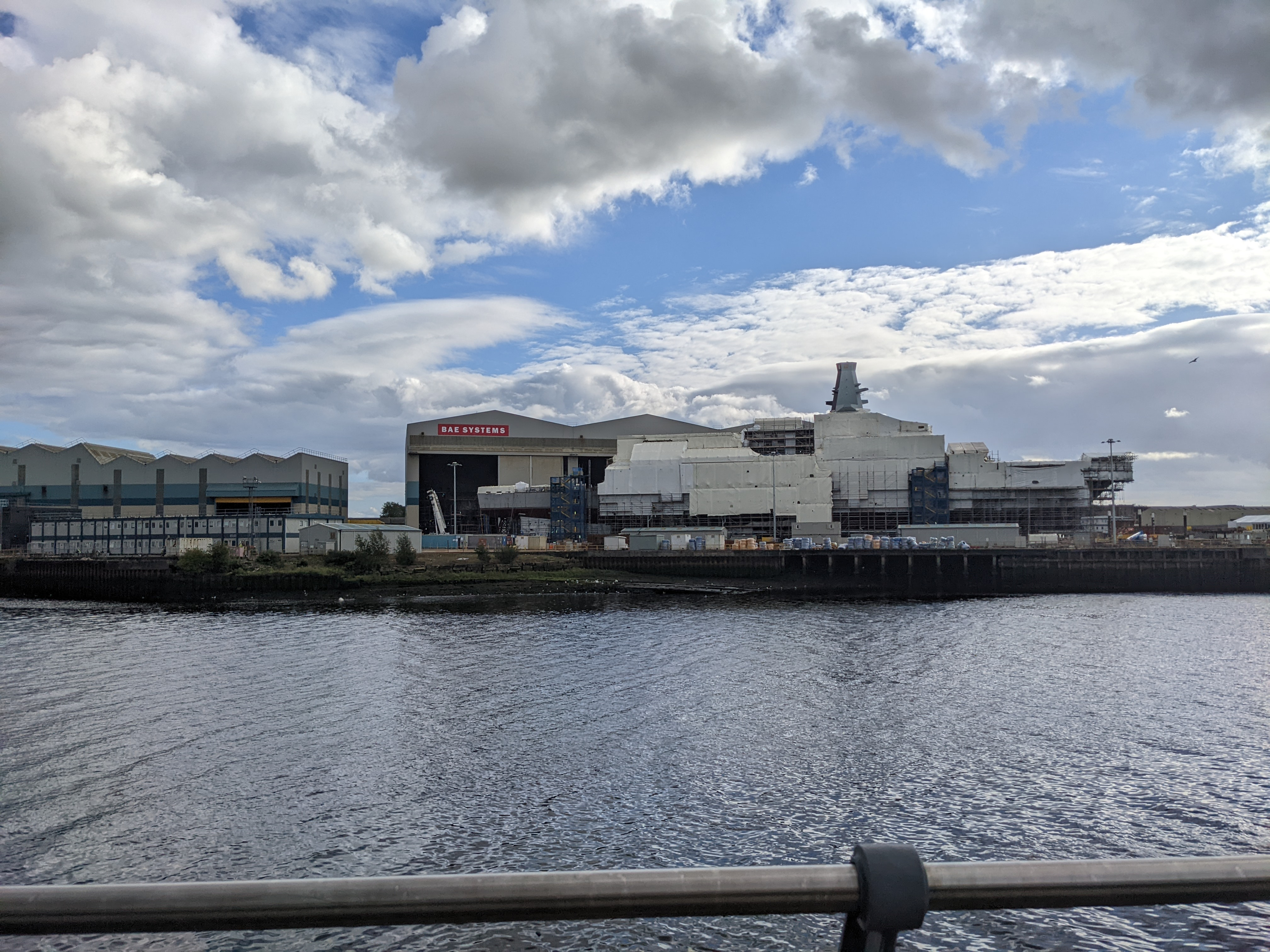
HMS Glasgow in August 2022

On 18 April 2021, the fore section of the ship moved out from its building shed on the Clyde.

On 1 May 2021, was joined with its aft section.

Commissioning was initially anticipated by late 2026 to be followed by a work-up period prior to reaching initial operating capability.

In October 2022, the Secretary of State for Defence, Ben Wallace, stated that the initial operating capability (IOC) for the ship had slipped from 2027 to 2028.

On 25 November 2022 the vessel began its launching process, by being rolled onto the Malin Augstea semi-submersible launch barge CD01, then towed down river to the Firth of Clyde and up Loch Long to the Glen Mallan jetty where it was launched a week after the process started, using the "float off" method. The frigate was then towed back upriver to the BAE Scotstoun shipyard for fitting out.

On 13 May 2023, the press reported that fitting out had been temporarily suspended, after workers found that the ships cabling had been sabotaged, the UK Defence Journal reporting that around 60 of the ship's cables had been cut, sabotage possibly related to a pay dispute.

HMS Glasgow was christened on 22 May 2025 at BAE Scotstoun by Catherine, Princess of Wales, using a bottle of whisky from Clydeside Distillery. It was attended by William, Prince of Wales, Second Sea Lord, Vice Admiral Sir Martin Connell, the managing director of BAE Systems Maritime – Naval Ships, Simon Lister, and the Lord Provost of Glasgow, Jacqueline McLaren. It featured a flypast of an RAF Poseidon aircraft from the CXX Squadron.

It has been reported that sea trials may begin in late 2026, before commissioning in 2027. Full operational capability may be reached in 2028.
