= USS Birmingham =

Three ships of the United States Navy have been named Birmingham, after the city of Birmingham, Alabama.

- USS Birmingham (CL-2), was a light cruiser in service from 1908 to 1923.
- USS Birmingham (CL-62), was a light cruiser commissioned in 1943, involved in heavy fighting in the Pacific War, and decommissioned in 1946.
- USS Birmingham (SSN-695), was a Los Angeles-class nuclear attack submarine in service from 1978 to 1997.

== See also ==
- HMS Birmingham
