= HMS Belfast (F90) =

Type 26 or City class frigate for the Royal Navy

History

United Kingdom
- Name: Belfast
- Namesake: Belfast
- Ordered: 2 July 2017
- Builder: BAE, Glasgow
- Laid down: 29 June 2021
- Sponsored by: The Countess of Antrim
- Commissioned: Expected 2029
- Identification: F90
- Status: Under construction

General characteristics
- Class & type: Type 26 frigate
- Displacement: 6,900 t (6,800 long tons; 7,600 short tons), 8,000+ t full load
- Length: 149.9 m (491 ft 10 in)
- Beam: 20.8 m (68 ft 3 in)
- Propulsion: CODLOG configuration: 1 × Rolls-Royce MT30 gas turbine; 4 × MTU Type 20V 4000 M53B high-speed diesel generators; 2 × electric motors
- Speed: In excess of 26 knots (48 km/h; 30 mph)
- Range: In excess of 7,000 nmi (13,000 km) in electric-motor (EM) drive
- Boats & landing craft carried: 2
- Complement: 157
- Sensors & processing systems: Radar; 3D radar - Type 997 Artisan; Kelvin Hughes Ltd SharpEye navigation radar; Terma SCANTER 6000 2D X-Band navigation radar; Sonar; Sonar 2087 (towed array sonar); Ultra Electronics Type 2150 bow sonar; Satcom; SCOT-5 satcom
- Electronic warfare & decoys: IRVIN-GQ DLF decoys
- Armament: Missiles: 12-cell VLS for 48 Sea Ceptor anti-air missiles; 24-cell Mark 41 VLS for Tomahawk, VL-ASROC, CAMM or ESSM (quadpacked), and anti-ship missiles.; Guns: 1 × 5-inch 62-calibre Mk 45 naval gun; 2 × 30 mm DS30M Mk2 guns; 2 × Phalanx CIWS; Browning .50 caliber heavy machine guns (TBC); 4 × general purpose machine guns
- Aircraft carried: Accommodation for two helicopters: Wildcat, armed with; 4 × anti-ship missiles, or; 2 × anti-submarine torpedoes; 20 × Martlet multirole air-surface missiles; Mk 11 depth charges; AgustaWestland Merlin, armed with; 4 × anti-submarine torpedoes
- Aviation facilities: Large Chinook-capable flight deck; Enclosed hangar; Facilities for UAVs
- Notes: Flexible Mission Bay; Rolls-Royce Mission Bay Handling System

HMS Belfast is a Type 26 frigate of the Royal Navy and the second vessel named after the Northern Ireland capital Belfast. In September 2017, her name was announced by the First Sea Lord. HM ships' names are recommended by the Ships' Names and Badges Committee before approval by the Navy Board and then the Minister of Defence. The preserved former Royal Navy cruiser HMS Belfast (C35) was renamed HMS Belfast (1938) by the Imperial War Museum to avoid confusion. She was ordered on 2 July 2017. The first steel was cut on HMS Belfast 29 June 2021 by Prince William, Duke of Cambridge.
