= HMS Dumbarton Castle =

Three ships of the Royal Navy have been named HMS Dumbarton Castle after Dumbarton Castle.

- HMS Dumbarton Castle (1707), originally of the Royal Scots Navy, was a frigate taken into the Royal Navy in 1707.
- HMS Dumbarton Castle (K388) was launched as Castle-class corvette and was later re-designated frigate. She was built in 1944 and saw service in the North Atlantic before being placed into reserve in 1946 before being scrapped.
- HMS Dumbarton Castle (P265) was a Castle-class patrol vessel launched in 1981 and sold in 2010 to Bangladesh as BNS Bijoy.

== Battle honours ==
- Atlantic 1944-45
- South Atlantic 1982
