= HMS Birmingham =

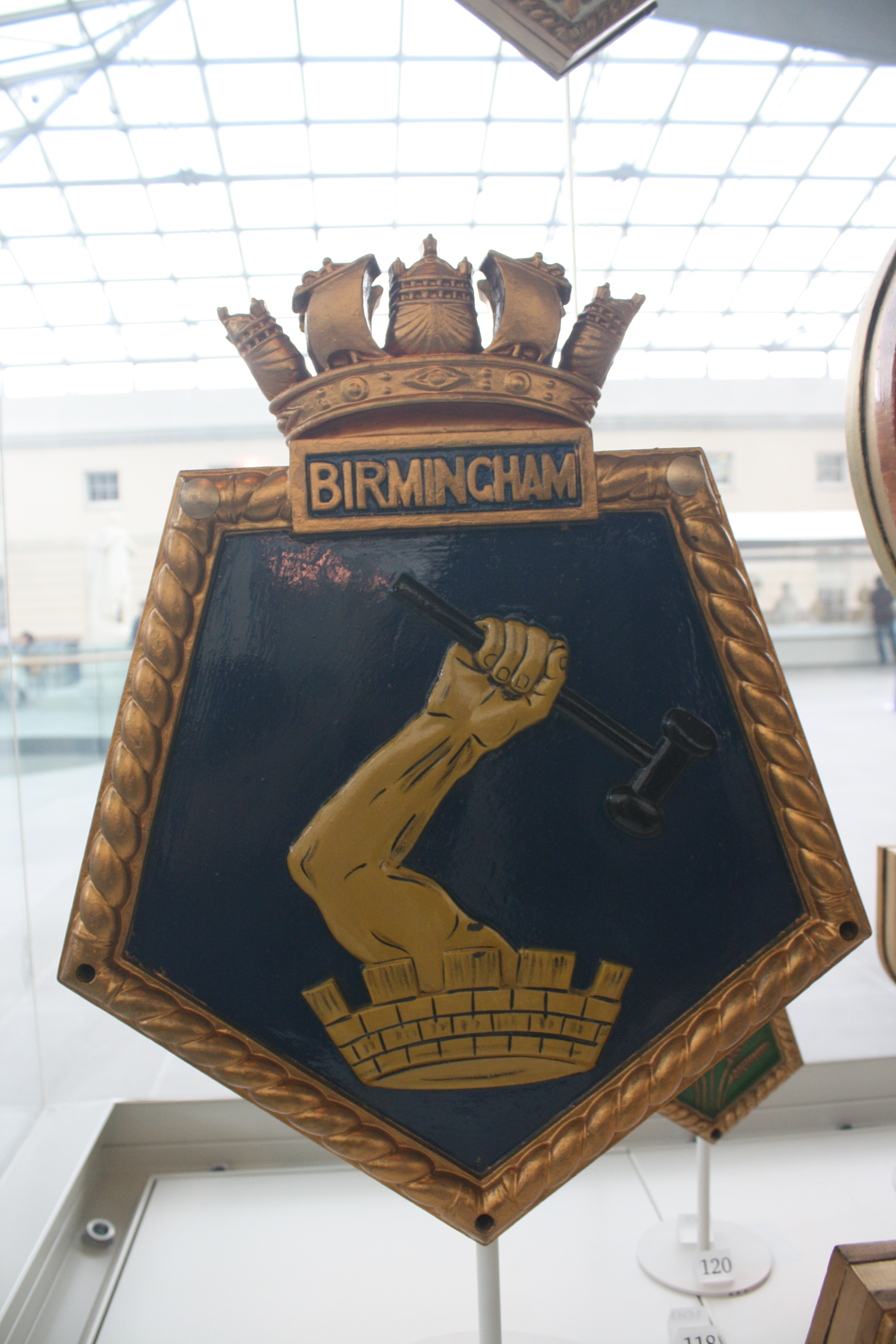
Ship's badge

Four ships of the Royal Navy have been named HMS Birmingham, after the city of Birmingham in England.

- The first HMS Birmingham (1913) was a 1910 Town-class light cruiser launched in 1913 and sold in 1931.
- The second HMS Birmingham (C19) was a 1936 Town-class light cruiser launched in 1936 and broken up in 1960.
- The third HMS Birmingham (D86) was a Type 42 destroyer in service from 1976 to 1999.
- The fourth HMS Birmingham (Type 26 frigate) will be a Type 26 frigate.

== Battle honours ==
- Heligoland 1914
- Dogger Bank 1915
- Jutland 1916
- Norway 1940
- Korea 1952–53

== See also ==
- USS Birmingham
