= Type 26 frigate =

Frigate class being built for the Royal Navy

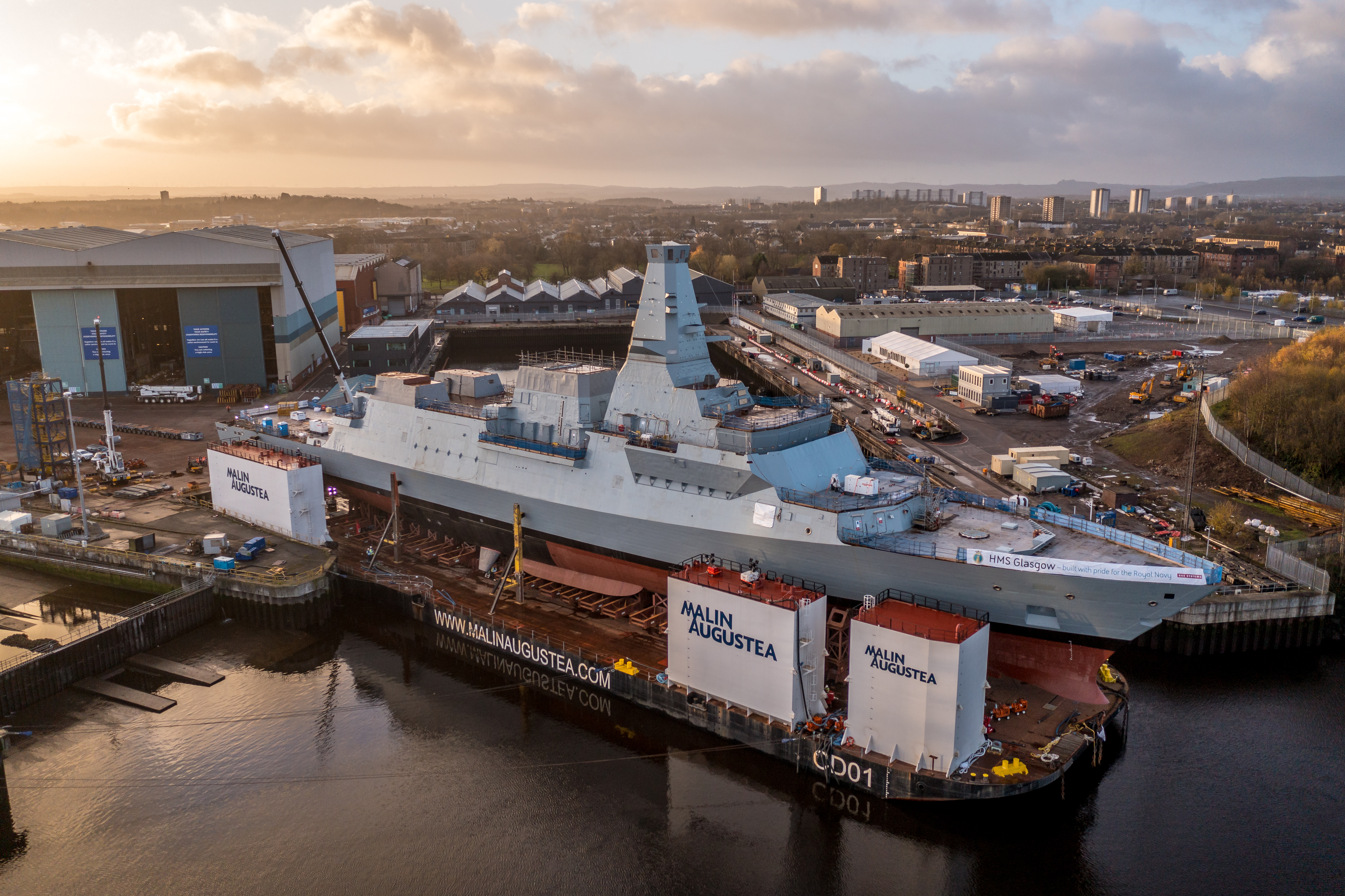
- HMS Glasgow, on barge for transport to DM Glen Douglas for launch in 2022

Class overview
- Name: Type 26 frigate
- Builders: BAE Systems Maritime – Naval Ships
- Operators: Royal Navy; Royal Australian Navy; Royal Canadian Navy; Royal Norwegian Navy
- Preceded by: Type 23 frigate (RN); Anzac-class frigate (RAN); Halifax-class frigate and Iroquois-class destroyer (RCN); Fridtjof Nansen-class frigate (RNoN)
- Subclasses: Hunter-class frigate (RAN); River-class destroyer (RCN)
- Cost: UK Batch 1: £1.31 billion (2022) (equivalent to £1.46 billion in 2024) per unit (est.); UK Batch 2: £4.2 billion (2022) (equivalent to £4.67 billion in 2024) for 5 units (est.); Australia: A$35 billion (2018) for 9 units + ToT (est.); Canada: CA$69.8 billion (2019) for 15 units + ToT (est.); Norway: £10 billion (2025) for at least 5 units + ToT (est.)
- Built: Contract award announced 2 July 2017
- In service: From 2028 (planned) (Note: While the first ship, HMS Glasgow, is planned for commissioning in late 2026, initial operating capability is only anticipated from 2028.)
- Planned: 34 total: 8 (RN) (Note: 13 hulls were originally planned. However, this number was reduced to 8 in favour of acquiring 5 cheaper and smaller Type 31e frigates.); 6 (RAN); 15 (RCN); At least 5 (RNoN)
- Building: 7 (5 x RN, 1 x RAN, 1 x RCN)
- Cancelled: 3 (RAN)

General characteristics (City class)
- Type: Anti-submarine warfare frigate
- Displacement: 7,700 tonnes (7,600 long tons; 8,500 short tons) light shipweight; 8,000 tonnes (7,900 long tons; 8,800 short tons) full load
- Length: 149.9 m (491 ft 10 in)
- Beam: 20.8 m (68 ft 3 in)
- Propulsion: CODLOG configuration: 1 × Rolls-Royce MT30 gas turbine; 4 × MTU Type 20V 4000 M53B high-speed diesel generators; 2 × electric motors
- Speed: In excess of 26 knots (48 km/h; 30 mph)
- Range: In excess of 7,000 nmi (13,000 km) in electric-motor (EM) drive
- Boats & landing craft carried: 2
- Complement: 157 (capacity for 208)
- Sensors & processing systems: Type 997 Artisan 3D radar; Kelvin Hughes SharpEye navigation radar; Terma SCANTER 6000 2D X-Band navigation radar; Sonar 2087 (towed array sonar); Ultra Electronics Type 2150 bow sonar; SCOT-5 satcom
- Electronic warfare & decoys: IRVIN-GQ DLF decoys; MEWSIC; Ancilia Decoy Launcher System; Naval Decoy IDS300; Surface Ship Torpedo Defence (SSTD)
- Armament: 12 - cell VLS for: 48 x CAMM (missile family) anti-air missiles (Sea Ceptor system); 1 × 24 - cell multi-purpose Mark 41 VLS for: Future Cruise/Anti-Ship Weapon (FC/ASW); 1 × 5-inch 62-calibre Mk 45 naval gun; 2 × 30 mm DS30M Mk2 guns; 2 × Phalanx CIWS; 4 × General purpose machine guns or 0.50 calibre heavy machine guns
- Aircraft carried: Wildcat (Note: armed with Sea Venom anti-ship missiles, or Sting Ray anti-submarine torpedoes, or Martlet multirole air-surface missiles, or Mk 11 depth charges) or AgustaWestland Merlin (Note: armed with up to 4 × Sting Ray anti-submarine torpedoes)
- Aviation facilities: Accommodation for two helicopters, Chinook-capable flight deck, Enclosed hangar and Facilities for UAVs
- Notes: Flexible mission bay

The Type 26 frigate, also known as City-class frigate, is a class of frigates and destroyers being built for the United Kingdom's Royal Navy, with variants also being built for the Australian, Canadian and Norwegian navies. The programme, known as the Global Combat Ship, was launched by the British Ministry of Defence to partially replace the navy's thirteen Type 23 frigates, and for export. Its primary role is to conduct advanced anti-submarine warfare missions while supporting air defence and general purpose operations. The type is the first naval platform shared between Australia, Canada and the United Kingdom since the pre-Second World War Tribal-class destroyer.

The programme began in 1998, under what was then known as the Future Surface Combatant (FSC). By March 2010 however, this procurement programme had evolved to become the Global Combat Ship, following the announcement of a four-year, £127 million design contract being awarded to BAE Systems Maritime – Naval Ships. The primary development phase started on 1 April 2015 and in August 2015, the first long lead time items for Type 26 were ordered, with manufacturing then expected to begin in 2016 and the first Type 26 to be delivered in 2023. Subsequently, the commissioning date for the first ship of the class slipped to late 2026, with initial operating capability now anticipated from 2028. The frigates will be built at BAE Systems' Govan and Scotstoun yards on the River Clyde in Glasgow. The contract award to manufacture the Type 26 was announced by BAE Systems on 2 July 2017, with steel cut for the first of class, HMS Glasgow on 20 July 2017.

In June 2018, the Australian Government announced that it had selected a modified version of the Type 26 platform as the planned replacement for its Anzac-class frigate. The Royal Australian Navy will procure six Hunter-class frigates which will be constructed by BAE Systems Australia at ASC's shipyard in Osborne, South Australia.

On 8 February 2019, the Canadian government awarded Lockheed Martin Canada a C$185 million contract to design a fleet of up to 15 warships based on the Type 26 (the Canadian Surface Combatant), with a total program cost of $60 billion. The amount of the contract will increase as the design work increases. The initial design contract is with Irving Shipbuilding of Halifax, Nova Scotia.

On 31 August 2025, the Norwegian government confirmed plans to acquire at least five Type 26 frigates in a deal worth £10 billion.

== Development ==
=== Future Surface Combatant ===
The Global Combat Ship started development under the original Future Surface Combatant (FSC) programme intended to replace the Royal Navy's Type 22 and Type 23 frigates. Planning for a replacement escort vessel started in 1998 with the ordering of a research vessel, RV Triton, to study whether a trimaran design was practical for such a large and complex vessel. More conventional designs however, were ultimately preferred. In March 2005, plans were released for a two-class solution, a cheaper "Medium Sized Vessel Derivative" entering service in 2016–19 and a more capable "Versatile Surface Combatant" entering service around 2023.

In early 2006 the MoD started a Sustained Surface Combatant Capability (S2C2) programme which explored synergies between the FSC and other needs, for minesweepers, patrol ships and survey ships. By early 2007 this had crystallised into the three requirements; C1, C2 and C3. The C1 was to be an anti-submarine warfare task group-enabled platform and would displace around 6,000 tonnes. C2 was to be a more general purpose platform displacing somewhere in the region of 4–5,000 tonnes, and C3 was to be a Global Corvette to replace a larger number of smaller vessels in service, such as minesweepers, patrol and survey ships. The Global Corvette was to displace around 2–3,000 tonnes.

The C3 concept began in early 2004 when the MoD issued a Request for Information (RFI) for a smaller class of ship known as the Global Corvette. Low running costs and the ability to operate forward in shallow, coastal areas where larger ships cannot were both important. BAE Systems, VT Group, Thales and Rolls-Royce responded in the autumn of 2004 with concepts ranging from a well-equipped Offshore Patrol Vessel (OPV) of 1,500 tonnes to an advanced and very capable "corvette" of 3,000 tonnes, along the lines of the USN's Littoral Combat Ship programme (LCS).

The FSC concept was brought forward in the 2008 budget, at the expense of options for two Type 45 destroyers not being taken up (ships 7 and 8). In 2009 BAE Systems received a contract to design the C1 and C2 frigates with a planned 25-year life. A total of 18 vessels (10 C1 and 8 C2) were planned to enter service from 2020, at a pace of roughly one per year. In early 2010 the C3 variant was dropped in favour of the Mine Countermeasures, Hydrography and Patrol Capability (MHPC) programme.

=== Global Combat Ship ===
Official mention of the Future Surface Combatant had all but disappeared by 2010, and on 25 March of that year, BAE Systems were given a four-year, £127 million contract by the Ministry of Defence to fully design a new class of warship, the "Global Combat Ship", previously C1 of the FSC. Expectations at the time were for the first ship to be "in service" by 2021. The October 2010 Strategic Defence and Security Review (SDSR) reaffirmed the government's commitment to the Global Combat Ship, saying; "As soon as possible after 2020 the Type 23 will be replaced by Type 26 frigates, designed to be easily adapted to change roles and capabilities depending on the strategic circumstances". As part of the defence review it was also announced that the remaining Type 22 frigates would be decommissioned without replacement, reducing the Royal Navy's escort fleet from 23 destroyers and frigates to 19 (6 Type 45 destroyers and 13 Type 23 frigates).

BAE Systems' original working baseline for the Global Combat Ship design was a vessel 141 metres long with a displacement of 6,850 tonnes and a range of 7,000 nautical miles at 18 knots. On 30 November 2010 however, it was reported that the specifications had been pared down, in effort to reduce the cost from £500M to £250–350M per ship. Subsequently, new specification details began to emerge of a smaller 5,400 tonne ship emphasising flexibility and modularity.

Unlike the FSC, the Global Combat Ship has only one hull design. Like the Franco-Italian family of FREMM multipurpose frigates however, three versions are proposed for export: a design optimised for anti-submarine warfare (ASW), an anti-aircraft warfare (AAW) variant and a general purpose (GP) variant.

Although a decision was made in November 2010 to reduce the specifications and capability requirements of the Global Combat Ship design, BAE Systems' design concepts by 2014 had returned to their original working baseline of a large 6,900 tonne warship. In February 2015, the MoD and BAE Systems signed a £859 million contract to continue development and progress towards manufacturing. A 12-month demonstration phase began on 1 April 2015 and, after a 12-month extension in March 2016, was scheduled to be completed in June 2017.

Primarily due to the costs of the ship, the 2015 Strategic Defence and Security Review reduced the planned procurement of Type 26 vessels from 13 ships to 8. The resulting gap would now be filled by a new class of cheaper frigate designated Type 31.

On 2 July 2017, BAE Systems announced it had been awarded a £3.7 billion contract by the UK MoD to manufacture the first three Type 26 ships. The statement said that steel would be cut for the first ship in Glasgow "in the coming weeks." In September 2015, the programme cost was estimated at £11.5 billion, for what was then assumed to be for 13 Global Combat Ships. The cost for the current eight ships was quoted as £8 billion in 2016. Three ships were ordered in 2017 for £3.7 billion.

In July 2021 it was revealed in response to a Parliamentary question that it was intended that the Type 26 frigate would be equipped with a new Future Cruise/Anti-ship Weapon from 2028.

== Partnerships ==
The Global Combat Ship has been designed from the outset with export in mind. During a House of Commons debate on 31 January 2011, it was revealed that Australia, Malaysia, New Zealand, and Turkey had all expressed interest in collaborating on the Global Combat Ship.

=== Australia ===
The governments of the United Kingdom and Australia had previously been exploring the potential for cooperation on the C1 and C3 designs of the Future Surface Combatant, which corresponded closely to the Royal Australian Navy's requirements in replacing its Anzac-class frigates with a new class of frigate. The two countries signed a defence cooperation treaty in January 2013 and Australia pledged cooperation on the Global Combat Ship design in order to investigate its suitability for their own procurement programme. In April 2016, Prime Minister Malcolm Turnbull confirmed that the Global Combat Ship was one of three designs shortlisted for the replacement of the Anzac-class frigates.

In September 2016 the Australian government awarded BAE Systems a contract to further refine the design of the Type 26 Global Combat Ship for the Royal Australian Navy under the SEA 5000 (Future Frigate) programme. Australia issued a request for tenders (RFT) in support of the programme in late March 2017. The programme is valued at AUD35 billion (US$26.25 billion). On 10 August 2017 BAE Systems announced it had submitted its bid for the SEA 5000 programme. Prime Minister Malcolm Turnbull announced in June 2018 that BAE had won the contract and Australia would build nine units of a modified version of the Type 26 concept vessel in Adelaide.

On 20 February 2024 the Australian government announced the Hunter class order will be reduced from nine to six ships. Another class of 11 new general-purpose frigates would be selected to serve alongside the Hunter class.

=== Canada ===
During the House of Commons debate of 31 January 2011, it was also disclosed that the Canadian government was interested in collaborating on the Global Combat Ship and that the UK and Canada were in "close discussion". However, a Canadian union campaigned that the Global Combat Ship threatened Canadian shipbuilders, and in the run-up to the May 2011 election a spokesman for Peter MacKay, at the time Canadian Defence Minister, ruled out involvement with the British programme. Turkey also later rejected the design in 2012 as not meeting its requirements.

Although Canada had previously ruled out partnership with the British programme, in May 2016 IHS Janes reported that the Global Combat Ship was still one of the contenders for the Canadian Surface Combatant requirement. Indeed, in November 2017, a Lockheed Martin-led consortium put forward their "CSC Proposal", based on the Type 26 design by BAE Systems, for the Royal Canadian Navy's future frigate project.

On 19 October 2018 it was announced that BAE-Lockheed Martin was selected as the 'preferred' bidder in the Canadian Surface Combatant programme and that the Canadian government would begin negotiations to award a contract for 15 ships worth CAD$60 billion with BAE and Lockheed Martin Canada, the primary contractors. The preferred bid beat out offers from Alion Science and Technology and their proposal based on the Dutch De Zeven Provinciën air defence and command (LCF) frigate and Navantia/Saab/CEA Technologies with their proposal based on the Spanish Navy F-105 frigate.

On 21 November 2018, Alion Science and Technology asked the Federal Court for a judicial review of the decision, claiming the winning bid was "incapable of meeting three critical mandatory requirements" of the design tender, including the mandatory speed requirements set by the Royal Canadian Navy.

On 27 November 2018, the Canadian International Trade Tribunal (CITT) ordered the Government to postpone the finalising of the deal to purchase the ships, while the complaint from Alion was investigated. On 11 December 2018, the CITT gave the government a green light to proceed with the Lockheed contract, but its inquiry into the compliance of the Type 26 with Canada's requirements continued. The Tribunal dismissed the case entirely in February 2019.

The Canadian Surface Combatant design contract was signed on 7 February 2019 by the Liberal government. The design contract with Irving and the Lockheed Martin-BAE consortium was negotiated in near record time, taking only three months.

On 28 June 2024, the construction of production test modules for the first three ships began, with the new ships designated as the River class; the names of the first three ships were also announced as HMCS Fraser, HMCS Saint-Laurent and HMCS Mackenzie. The ships were designated as destroyers (DDGH) as defined in NATO STANAG 1166, a NATO-level ship designator system. Full rate production was expected to begin in 2025 with the first ship planned for service entry in the early 2030s.

=== Norway ===
On 15 April 2024, The Daily Telegraph reported that Norway, which had a plan to purchase at least five frigates, was a potential customer for the Type 26 frigate. However, as Norway was reportedly seeking at least one frigate by 2029, the article stated that this would require the Royal Navy to sell one of its early-stage hulls, as BAE is committed to deliver the Type 26 to the UK first. The MoD confirmed that it was involved in discussions about the issue but that no decisions had been made.

On 31 August 2025, the Norwegian Government reported it had chosen the UK as its strategic partner to acquire frigates. It confirmed a £10 billion deal to purchase at least 5 Type 26 frigates for the Royal Norwegian Navy, to replace its Fridtjof Nansen-class frigates. Described as Norway's largest defence investment to date, they will also be part of a joint British-Norwegian fleet of 13 anti-submarine warfare frigates (8 British and at least 5 Norwegian) operating in Northern Europe. The first Norwegian Type 26 is expected to be delivered by 2029 – this may require one of the hulls being built for the United Kingdom (either Belfast or Birmingham) to be diverted to the Norwegian order to meet the timescale requirement.

== Possible partnerships ==
=== Brazil ===
In September 2010, the British and Brazilian governments reached a defence agreement, including the potential sale of five or six Global Combat Ships to the Brazilian Navy. The following month, BAE Systems formally made a detailed proposal to the Brazilian Navy, for a package including the Global Combat Ship as well as variants of the Wave-class tanker and River-class patrol vessel.

== Characteristics ==
The Global Combat Ship is designed with modularity and flexibility to enhance versatility across the full range of operations, including maritime security, counter-piracy, counter-terrorist and humanitarian and disaster relief operations. The design is intended to facilitate through-life support, ensuring upgrades can be undertaken as technology develops.

As of 2017, BAE Systems' website suggests a displacement of 6,900 tonnes, a length of 149.9 m (492 ft) a beam of 20.8 m (68 ft) and a top speed in excess of 26 knots (48 km/h). The Global Combat Ship will have a core crew of 157 with room for a total of 208.

The Global Combat Ship is designed for up to 60 days' endurance and a range of approximately 7,000 nautical miles (13,000 km). Located at the stern are facilities allowing for the deployment of rigid-hulled inflatable boats, unmanned surface vehicles or a towed array sonar. A large Integrated Mission Bay and hangar is located amidship, enabling a variety of missions and associated equipment. Aircraft similar in size to the Boeing Chinook can be flown off the large flight deck, and the hangar can accommodate up to two helicopters the size of an AgustaWestland AW159 Wildcat or AgustaWestland Merlin. The hangar also has space to accommodate unmanned aerial vehicles.

The Royal Navy's version of the Global Combat Ship is referred to as the Type 26 frigate. This will be equipped with the Type 997 Artisan 3D search radar and Sea Ceptor (CAMM) air-defence missiles launched via 48 vertical launching system (VLS) canisters. Following a renovation of the Royal Navy's website in mid-2023 the section outlining the Type 26's weapon suite refers to Sea Ceptor being quad-packed into a separate 12-cell vertical launch system, which seems to indicate that an Extensible Launching System (ExLS) outfit could be provided for the same number of missiles. No official information outside of the website has been provided to confirm any such change.

In addition to the above missile systems, 24 Mark 41 "strike-length VLS" cells are positioned forward of the bridge. On 8 July 2021, it was confirmed that the Anglo-French-Italian Future Cruise/Anti-Ship Weapon(s) would be brought into service on the Type 26, which is likely to be launched from the Mark 41 VLS. The Mark 41 is also capable of firing missiles such as the Tomahawk land-attack cruise missile, anti-submarine rockets, or quad-packed ESSMs. Some countries, such as Australia and Canada, have forgone the Phalanx CIWS system in favour of the missile based SeaRAM for point defense.

Like the Type 23 frigate it will replace, the Global Combat Ship will have an acoustically quiet hull for anti-submarine warfare and will be fitted with an Ultra Electronics Type 2150 next-generation bow sonar and a powerful Sonar 2087 towed array. The Global Combat Ship will also be fitted with guns of various calibres. Instead of the RN's current 4.5-inch Mark 8 naval gun, the Global Combat Ship will be equipped with a NATO-standard BAE 5-inch, 62-calibre Mark 45 naval gun. Smaller guns include two Phalanx CIWS (which can be replaced with SeaRAM), two 30mm DS30M Mark 2 Automated Small Calibre Guns and a number of miniguns and general-purpose machine guns. On 26 March 2024, it was announced that Sea Gnat fixed decoy launching system would be replaced across the entire Royal Navy's escort fleet with SEA's Ancilia trainable decoy launcher including on the Type 26 following the signing of a £135 million contract. A pair of launchers will be mounted to the deck and will each provide twelve ready rounds of Infrared seduction decoys and radio frequency distraction decoys to defeat missile threats and possibly the ability to launch Martlet missiles in the future.

The propulsion system of the RN ships will consist of a gas turbine direct drive and four high speed diesel generators driving two electric motors in a combined diesel-electric or gas (CODLOG) configuration. In 2012 Rolls-Royce repackaged the MT30 used in the Queen Elizabeth-class aircraft carriers so that it would fit into smaller ships. The MT30 will be used in the Type 26. BAE Systems has suggested that some customers will install gas turbine engines and others will prefer to sacrifice 2–3 knots of speed by choosing cheaper diesel engines. The CODLOG configuration for propulsion is a simpler version of the Combined diesel-electric and gas (CODLAG) propulsion used on the Type 23 which this ship is to replace, and both of the Global Combat Ship's design contemporaries – the Queen Elizabeth-class aircraft carrier and the Type 45 destroyer – use integrated electric propulsion (IEP).

== Construction ==
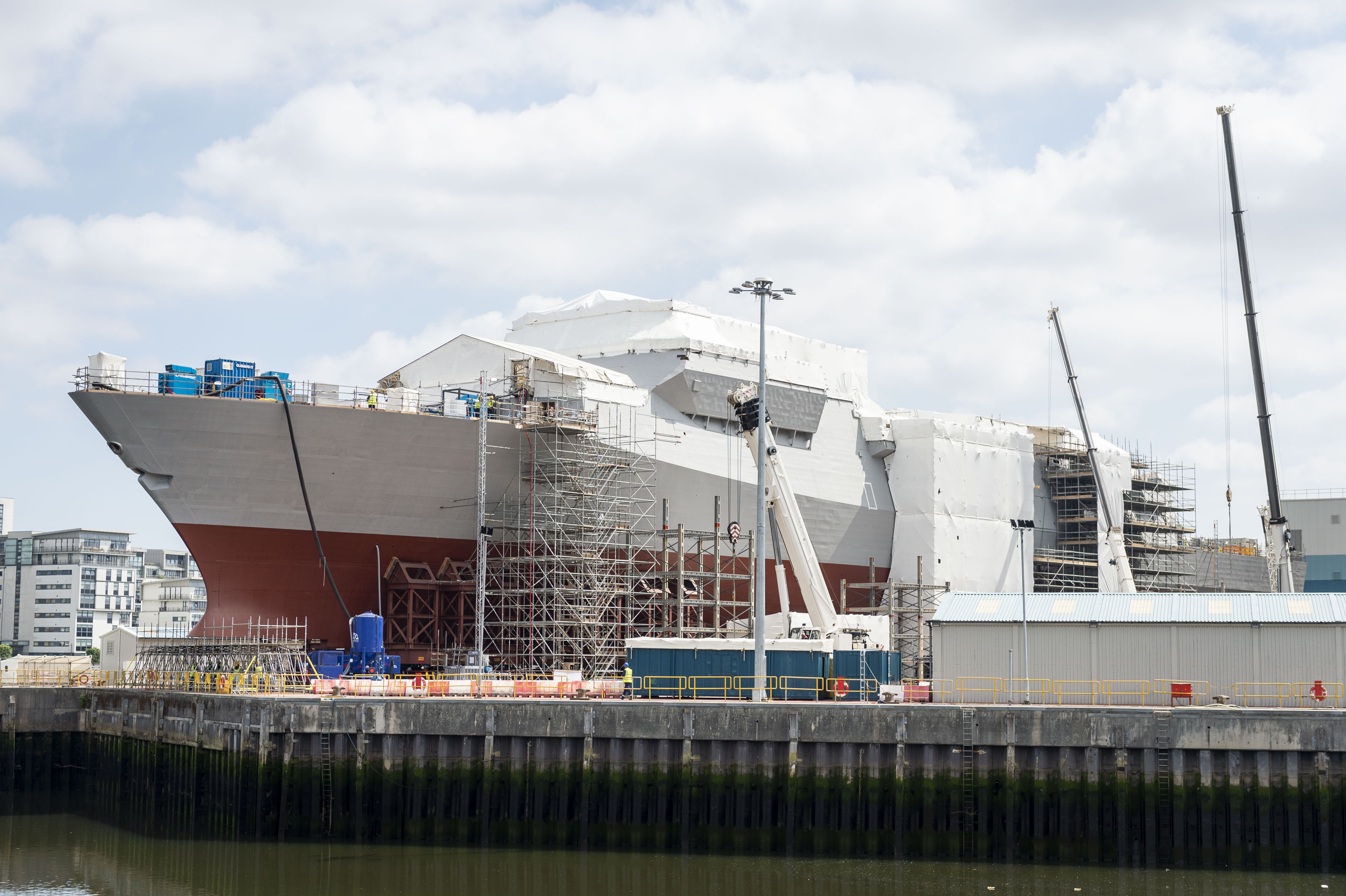
HMS Glasgow under construction in June 2021

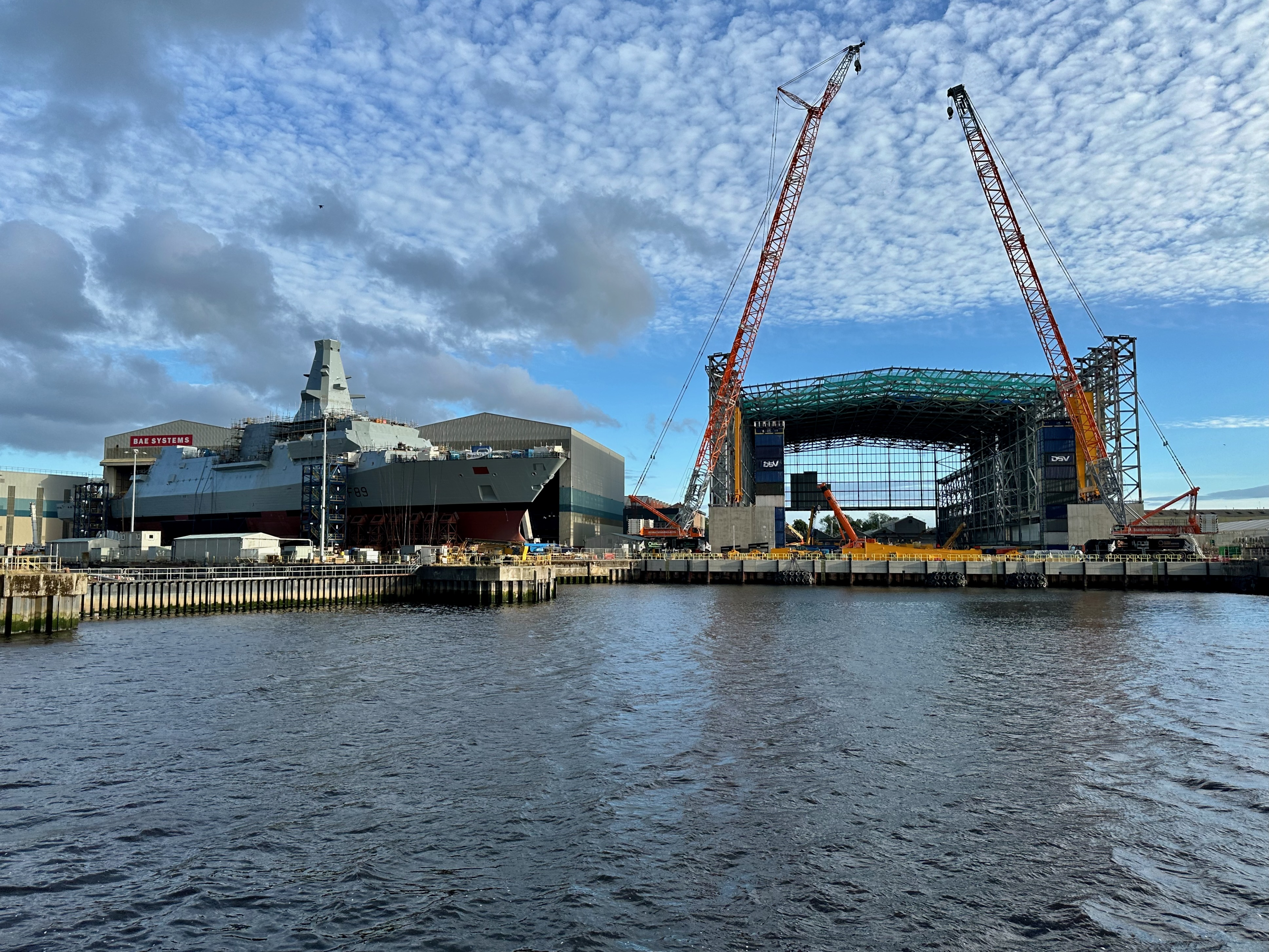
HMS Cardiff at Govan in August 2024, shortly before launch, the new Janet Harvey Hall assembly facility being built, to accommodate two frigates under construction at the same time.

The first steel for the first three of eight Royal Navy ships was cut on 20 July 2017. BAE Systems announced the award of the Type 26's first seven equipment manufacturing contracts in July 2015, these worth in excess of £170 million. Contracts were awarded to Babcock International for the ship's air weapons handling system; David Brown Gear Systems Ltd for the propulsion gearbox and the test facility; GE Power Conversion for the electric propulsion motor and drive system and testing facility; Raytheon Anschütz for the integrated navigation and bridge system including customer-specific design and development, a land-based integration facility, and a wide range of services; Rolls-Royce Power Engineering for the gas turbine; Rohde & Schwarz UK Ltd for the communications systems; WR Davis of Canada for the uptakes and downtakes of the ship's funnel and exhaust system.

In December 2016, BAE Systems announced the award of six additional Type 26 equipment manufacturing contracts with Detegase of Spain for sewage and water treatment, Salt Separation Services for desalination equipment, Johnson Controls for chilled water plants, Marine Systems Technology Ltd for gas-, weather-, and water-tight doors, hatches, and Rolls-Royce for stabilisers and steering components. Also awarded a contract was Pellegrini Marine Equipments of Italy. These awards brought to £380 million the total investment in the supply chain for the Type 26.

According to Gary McCloskey, head of Type 26 supply chain at BAE Systems, by March 2017 between 40 and 50 suppliers were engaged in the Type 26 programme, and about 33 had full contracts.

On 5 April 2017 Raytheon Anschütz announced successful integration of Warship Electronic Chart Display Information System (WECDIS) into their Integrated Navigation and Bridge Systems (INBS) for the Type 26.

In July 2017 BAE Systems stated that the Type 26 programme currently employs more than 1,200 people in the UK supply chain, and in the future, the programme would secure more than 3,400 jobs across BAE Systems and the wider UK maritime supply chain. It was also stated in July 2017, coinciding with the announcement of additional contracts, total investment in the Type 26 supply chain had reached £500 million. The 14 companies awarded contracts in the July announcement include Babcock for the helicopter landing grid, MSI Defence Systems for the small calibre gun, and Thales for the towed array system. The largest of the July-announced contracts are for the procurement of structural steel for the first three ships from UK and European steel mills by Dent Steel Services Ltd.

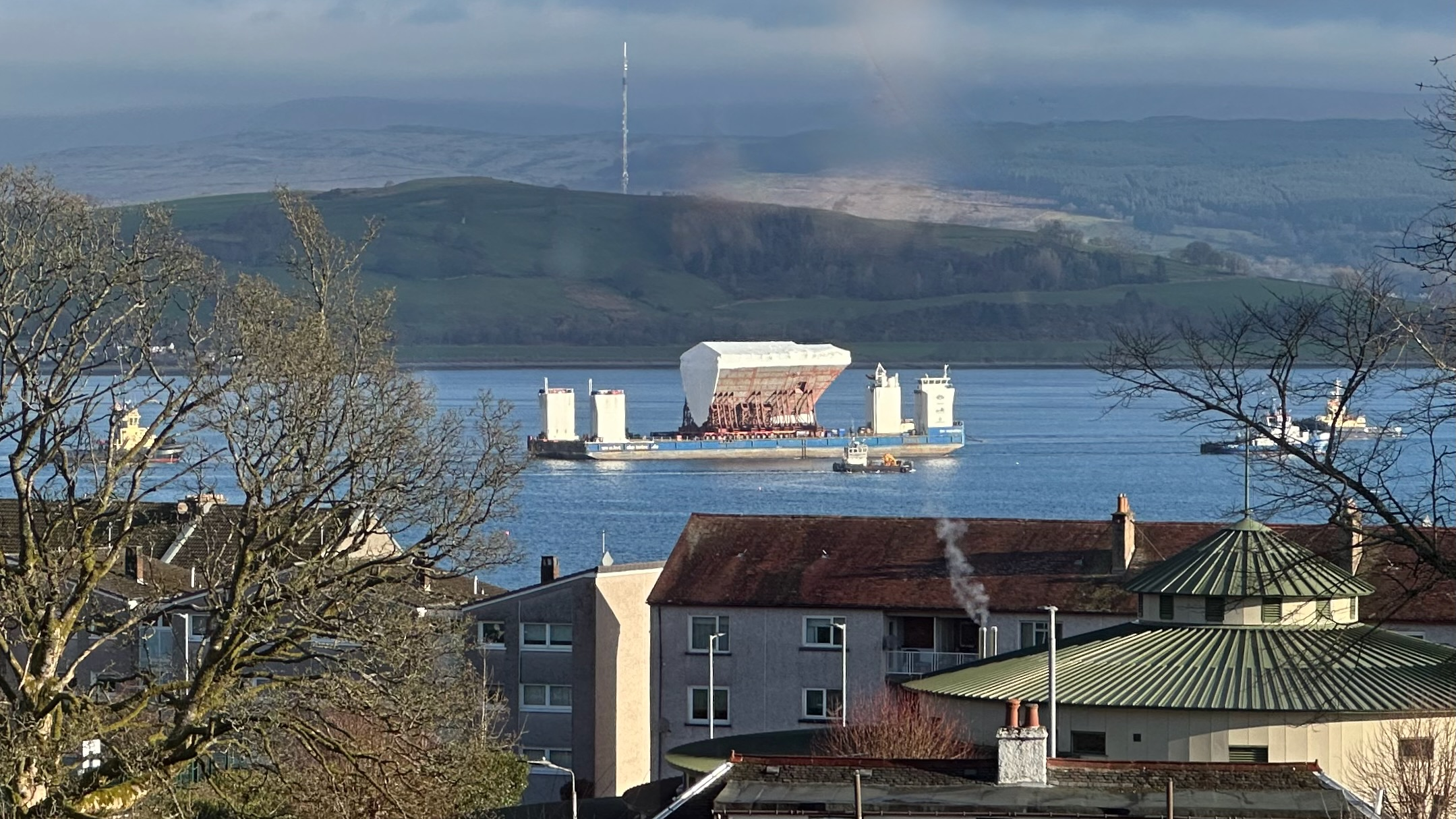
Bow section of HMS Birmingham arriving at the Clyde.

As part of the Type 26 frigate programme, BAE Systems has subcontracted the construction of various hull sections to several UK shipyards. These contracts are awarded on a per-ship basis, with each yard responsible for fabricating specific units that are subsequently transported to BAE's facility in Govan for final assembly. These include:

- Cammell Laird in Birkenhead, which has delivered large modular blocks for HMS Belfast, as well as a 1,000-tonne consolidated hull section for HMS Birmingham, and a bow section delivered on 7 March 2026.
- A&P Tyne in Hebburn, which completed four stern-end hull units for HMS Belfast.
- Ferguson Marine in Port Glasgow, which began work in 2024 on three steel hull modules for HMS Belfast, marking the yard's first contribution to a Royal Navy warship.

== Ships of the class ==
The original planning assumption for the Royal Navy was for thirteen Global Combat Ships (eight ASW and five GP), replacing the Type 23 frigate fleet like-for-like. As a result of the November 2015 Strategic Defence and Security Review however, it was decided that only the eight anti-submarine warfare Type 26 frigates would be ordered, with the funding for the remaining five general purpose Type 26 frigates instead to be spent on developing a new class of lighter and lower cost general-purpose frigates (GPFF) designated Type 31 frigate..

As expected cost per ship had decreased, the government suggested that an eventual increase in the total number of frigates in the Royal Navy may be possible. In July 2016, BAE revealed two general purpose frigate designs to meet the requirement; the Avenger class and the Cutlass class. In September 2019 it was announced that Babcock's Arrowhead 140 design, based on the Danish Iver Huitfeldt-class frigate, had been selected for the Type 31 frigate program.

=== Naming the ships ===
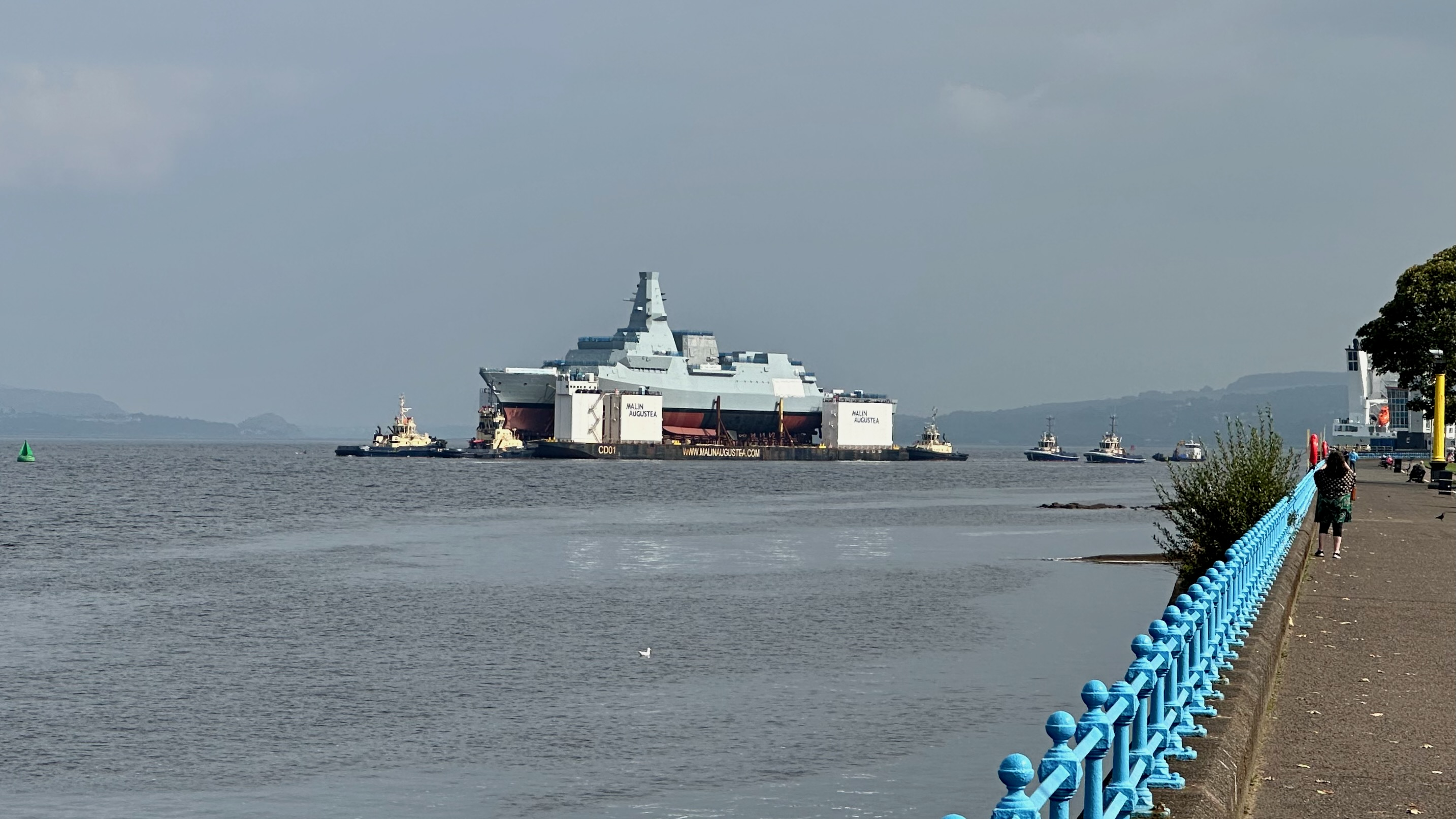
30 August 2024, HMS Cardiff heading down the Clyde on semi-submersible launch barge Malin Augustea CD01, for launching at Glen Mallan about 34 miles (55 km) from Govan.

==== Royal Navy ====
During 2014, a campaign emerged to name one of the ships HMS Plymouth, although Royal Navy ship names are formed via the Ships' Names and Badges Committee. In July 2017, construction of the first ship began in Govan; at the same time as work on the ship was started, it was announced that it would be named HMS Glasgow. The second named unit (although planned as the third ship of Batch 1) was announced as HMS Belfast in September 2017. The Second World War era light cruiser HMS Belfast (C35), a museum ship, will be named "HMS Belfast (1938)" by the Imperial War Museum to avoid "any possibility of confusion".

In March 2018 the First Sea Lord, Admiral Philip Jones, announced that the second ship of the class would be HMS Cardiff. In September 2018 it was announced that the first of the planned five Batch 2 ships would be HMS Birmingham. In November 2018, subsequent Batch 2 ships were announced as Sheffield, Newcastle, Edinburgh and London. Of the eight names, six were previously used as names of Type 42 destroyers, while the previous HMS London was a Type 22 frigate. HMS Sheffield was previously used on both a Type 22 frigate and a Type 42 destroyer before that. An order for the final five ships in the class was formally placed in November 2022.

==== Royal Australian Navy ====
In June 2018, on the announcement that the Type 26 had been selected as the basis for the Future Frigate programme of the Royal Australian Navy, it was also announced that they would be known as the Hunter class, with the names of the first three given as HMAS Hunter, HMAS Flinders and HMAS Tasman. All three were named for seafarers that had played a significant role in the early history of modern Australia - John Hunter was an officer of the Royal Navy who, between 1795 and 1800, served as the second Governor of New South Wales; Matthew Flinders was a cartographer who undertook the first inshore circumnavigation and survey of the Australian continent between 1802 and 1803; and Abel Tasman was a Dutch explorer who discovered the island that came to be called Tasmania in 1642. Of the first three, only Flinders has been used previously in the RAN; the previous HMAS Flinders was a survey ship in service between 1973 and 1998.

==== Royal Canadian Navy ====
In June 2024, the announcement of the order being placed for the first three ships of the Canadian Surface Combatant programme also saw them being named as River class (with the Canadian ships being classed as destroyers rather than frigates). The names of the three individual ships was also announced, with each being named for a Canadian river. All three had previously been used as the names of ships from a series of destroyer escorts in service with the Royal Canadian Navy from the 1950s to the 1990s. HMCS Fraser and HMCS Saint-Laurent are named for members of the St. Laurent class, a class of ASW destroyers commissioned in the mid to late 1950s. HMCS Mackenzie is named for the lead ship of the Mackenzie class, a type of destroyer used for general purpose and training duties.

=== List of ships ===
Operator	Builder	Order (date)	Status	Name	No.	Steel cut	Laid down	Launched	Comm.	Notes
City-class frigate
Royal Navy	(United Kingdom) BAE Systems Maritime (Govan shipyard, Glasgow)	Batch 1; 2 Jul 2017	Fitting out	HMS Glasgow	F88	20 Jul 2017	–	3 Dec 2022	2028	
Royal Navy	(United Kingdom) BAE Systems Maritime (Govan shipyard, Glasgow)	Batch 1; 2 Jul 2017	Fitting out	HMS Cardiff	F89	14 Aug 2019	–	5 Sep 2024	2028 / 2029	
Royal Navy	(United Kingdom) BAE Systems Maritime (Govan shipyard, Glasgow)	Batch 1; 2 Jul 2017	Under construction (Note: Earmarked for potential diversion as first Norwegian ship)	HMS Belfast	F90	29 Jun 2021	–	–	2029 / 2030	
Royal Navy	(United Kingdom) BAE Systems Maritime (Govan shipyard, Glasgow)	Batch 2; 15 Nov 2022	Under construction (Note: Earmarked for potential diversion as first Norwegian ship)	HMS Birmingham	F91	4 Apr 2023	–	–	From 2030	
Royal Navy	(United Kingdom) BAE Systems Maritime (Govan shipyard, Glasgow)	Batch 2; 15 Nov 2022	Under construction (Note: Earmarked for potential diversion as first Norwegian ship)	HMS Sheffield	F92	28 Nov 2024	–	–	–	
Royal Navy	(United Kingdom) BAE Systems Maritime (Govan shipyard, Glasgow)	Batch 2; 15 Nov 2022	On order	HMS Newcastle	F93	–	–	–	–	
Royal Navy	(United Kingdom) BAE Systems Maritime (Govan shipyard, Glasgow)	Batch 2; 15 Nov 2022	On order	HMS Edinburgh	F94	–	–	–	–	
Royal Navy	(United Kingdom) BAE Systems Maritime (Govan shipyard, Glasgow)	Batch 2; 15 Nov 2022	On order	HMS London	F95	–	–	–	2037	
Unnamed class
Royal Norwegian Navy	(United Kingdom) BAE Systems Maritime (Govan shipyard, Glasgow)	31 Aug 2025	On order	TBA	TBA	–	–	–	2030	
Royal Norwegian Navy	(United Kingdom) BAE Systems Maritime (Govan shipyard, Glasgow)	31 Aug 2025	On order	TBA	TBA	–	–	–	–	
Royal Norwegian Navy	(United Kingdom) BAE Systems Maritime (Govan shipyard, Glasgow)	31 Aug 2025	On order	TBA	TBA	–	–	–	–	
Royal Norwegian Navy	(United Kingdom) BAE Systems Maritime (Govan shipyard, Glasgow)	31 Aug 2025	On order	TBA	TBA	–	–	–	–	
Royal Norwegian Navy	(United Kingdom) BAE Systems Maritime (Govan shipyard, Glasgow)	31 Aug 2025	On order	TBA	TBA	–	–	–	–	
Hunter-class frigate
Royal Australian Navy	BAE Systems Maritime Australia (Osborne Naval Sipyard, Adelaide)	Batch 1; 14 Dec 2018	Under construction	HMAS Hunter	–	21 Jun 2024	24 Aug 2026	–	2032	
Royal Australian Navy	BAE Systems Maritime Australia (Osborne Naval Sipyard, Adelaide)	Batch 1; 14 Dec 2018	On order	HMAS Flinders	–	–	–	–	–	
Royal Australian Navy	BAE Systems Maritime Australia (Osborne Naval Sipyard, Adelaide)	Batch 1; 14 Dec 2018	On order	HMAS Tasman	–	–	–	–	–	
Royal Australian Navy	BAE Systems Maritime Australia (Osborne Naval Sipyard, Adelaide)	Batch 2 No order yet	Planned	–	–	–	–	–	–	
Royal Australian Navy	BAE Systems Maritime Australia (Osborne Naval Sipyard, Adelaide)	Batch 2 No order yet	Planned	–	–	–	–	–	–	
Royal Australian Navy	BAE Systems Maritime Australia (Osborne Naval Sipyard, Adelaide)	Batch 2 No order yet	Planned	–	–	–	–	–	–	
River-class destroyer
Royal Canadian Navy	Irving Shipbuilding Inc. / BAE Systems / Lockheed Martin Canada (Halifax Shipyard)	Batch 1; 3 Mar 2025	In construction	Fraser	DDGH 1	28 Jun 2024	12 Jun 2026	–	Early 2030s	3 ordered, full-rate production started the 25 Apr 2025.
Royal Canadian Navy	Irving Shipbuilding Inc. / BAE Systems / Lockheed Martin Canada (Halifax Shipyard)	Batch 1; 3 Mar 2025	On order	Saint-Laurent	DDGH 2	–	–	–	–	3 ordered, full-rate production started the 25 Apr 2025.
Royal Canadian Navy	Irving Shipbuilding Inc. / BAE Systems / Lockheed Martin Canada (Halifax Shipyard)	Batch 1; 3 Mar 2025	On order	Mackenzie	DDGH 3	–	–	–	–	3 ordered, full-rate production started the 25 Apr 2025.
Royal Canadian Navy	Irving Shipbuilding Inc. / BAE Systems / Lockheed Martin Canada (Halifax Shipyard)	Batch 2 No order yet	Planned	–	–	–	–	–	–	Total of 15 destroyers planned.
Royal Canadian Navy	Irving Shipbuilding Inc. / BAE Systems / Lockheed Martin Canada (Halifax Shipyard)	Batch 2 No order yet	Planned	–	–	–	–	–	–	Total of 15 destroyers planned.
Royal Canadian Navy	Irving Shipbuilding Inc. / BAE Systems / Lockheed Martin Canada (Halifax Shipyard)	Batch 2 No order yet	Planned	–	–	–	–	–	–	Total of 15 destroyers planned.
Royal Canadian Navy	Irving Shipbuilding Inc. / BAE Systems / Lockheed Martin Canada (Halifax Shipyard)	Batch 2 No order yet	Planned	–	–	–	–	–	–	Total of 15 destroyers planned.
Royal Canadian Navy	Irving Shipbuilding Inc. / BAE Systems / Lockheed Martin Canada (Halifax Shipyard)	Batch 2 No order yet	Planned	–	–	–	–	–	–	Total of 15 destroyers planned.
Royal Canadian Navy	Irving Shipbuilding Inc. / BAE Systems / Lockheed Martin Canada (Halifax Shipyard)	Batch 2 No order yet	Planned	–	–	–	–	–	–	Total of 15 destroyers planned.
Royal Canadian Navy	Irving Shipbuilding Inc. / BAE Systems / Lockheed Martin Canada (Halifax Shipyard)	Batch 2 No order yet	Planned	–	–	–	–	–	–	Total of 15 destroyers planned.
Royal Canadian Navy	Irving Shipbuilding Inc. / BAE Systems / Lockheed Martin Canada (Halifax Shipyard)	Batch 2 No order yet	Planned	–	–	–	–	–	–	Total of 15 destroyers planned.
Royal Canadian Navy	Irving Shipbuilding Inc. / BAE Systems / Lockheed Martin Canada (Halifax Shipyard)	Batch 2 No order yet	Planned	–	–	–	–	–	–	Total of 15 destroyers planned.
Royal Canadian Navy	Irving Shipbuilding Inc. / BAE Systems / Lockheed Martin Canada (Halifax Shipyard)	Batch 2 No order yet	Planned	–	–	–	–	–	–	Total of 15 destroyers planned.
Royal Canadian Navy	Irving Shipbuilding Inc. / BAE Systems / Lockheed Martin Canada (Halifax Shipyard)	Batch 2 No order yet	Planned	–	–	–	–	–	–	Total of 15 destroyers planned.
Royal Canadian Navy	Irving Shipbuilding Inc. / BAE Systems / Lockheed Martin Canada (Halifax Shipyard)	Batch 2 No order yet	Planned	–	–	–	–	–	2050	Total of 15 destroyers planned.

Planned / expected dates

== Similar ships ==
- ASWF of the Royal Netherlands Navy and Belgian navy.
- FREMM multipurpose frigate – a Franco-Italian design adopted by the navies of France, Italy, Morocco, and Egypt
- Nilgiri-class frigate of the Indian Navy
- Álvaro de Bazán-class frigate, a Spanish design adopted by the Spanish and Australian navies
- Defence and intervention frigate (FDI) of the French Navy
- New FFM of the Japan Maritime Self-Defense Force

== See also ==
- List of naval ship classes in service
- Future of the Royal Navy
- Type 31 frigate
- Type 32 frigate
