= HMS Edinburgh =

List of ships with the same or similar names

Six ships of the Royal Navy have been named HMS Edinburgh, for the Scottish city of Edinburgh. In addition, one ship of the Royal Navy has carried the similar name HMS Duke of Edinburgh.

== HMS Edinburgh ==
- HMS Edinburgh (1707) was a 32-gun fifth rate, originally the Scottish ship Royal William. She was transferred from the Royal Scottish Navy in 1707, and was sunk as a breakwater in 1709.
- HMS Edinburgh was a 70-gun third rate launched in 1666 as HMS Warspite. She was renamed HMS Edinburgh in 1721, rebuilt twice in 1721 and 1744, before being broken up in 1771.
- HMS Edinburgh (1811) was a 74-gun third rate launched in 1811. She was converted to screw propulsion in 1846 before being sold in 1865.
- HMS Edinburgh (1882) was a Colossus-class battleship, built as HMS Majestic, but renamed two days before being launched in 1882. She was sold in 1910.
- HMS Edinburgh (16) was a Town-class light cruiser launched in 1939. She was damaged by a torpedo and then scuttled in the Barents Sea in mid-1942.
- HMS Edinburgh (D97) was a Type 42 destroyer launched in 1983 and decommissioned on 6 June 2013.
- HMS Edinburgh will be the name of Type 26 frigate.

=== Battle honours ===
- Finisterre II 1747
- Cape Francois 1757
- Syria 1840
- Baltic 1854–55
- Norway 1940–41
- Bismarck 1941
- Atlantic 1941
- Malta Convoys 1941
- Arctic 1941–42

== HMS Duke of Edinburgh ==
- HMS Duke of Edinburgh (1904) was a Duke of Edinburgh-class armoured cruiser launched in 1904 and sold in 1920.
- One of the planned CVA-01 aircraft carriers of the 1960s was tentatively named HMS Duke of Edinburgh but the design was never constructed.

=== Battle Honours ===
- Jutland 1916
