= DM Glen Douglas =

Military munitions depot

- Near Loch Long, Argyll and Bute in Scotland
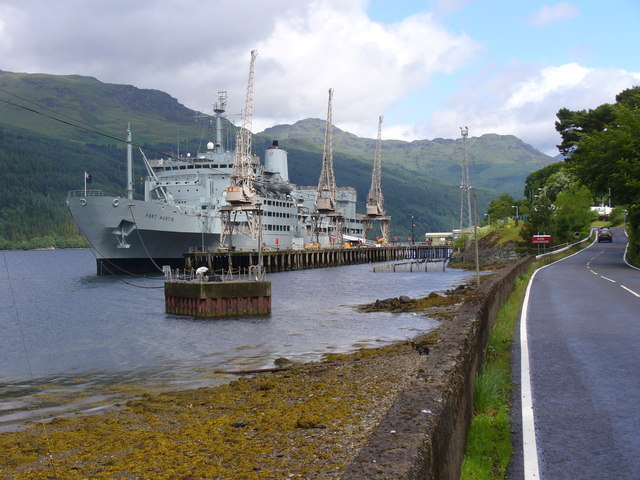
- RFA Fort Austin at the old Glen Mallan jetty in 2008.

Site information
- Type: Ammunition depot
- Owner: Ministry of Defence
- Operator: Defence Equipment & Support
- Condition: Operational

Location
- Location in Argyll and Bute
- Coordinates: 56.159901°N 4.771220°W
- Area: 223 hectares

Site history
- Built: 1962–1966
- In use: 1966 – present

Defence Munitions (DM) Glen Douglas is a military munitions depot located near Loch Long, Argyll, in Scotland. It is operated by Defence Equipment & Support, part of the Ministry of Defence. It was formerly known as RNAD Glen Douglas.

== History ==
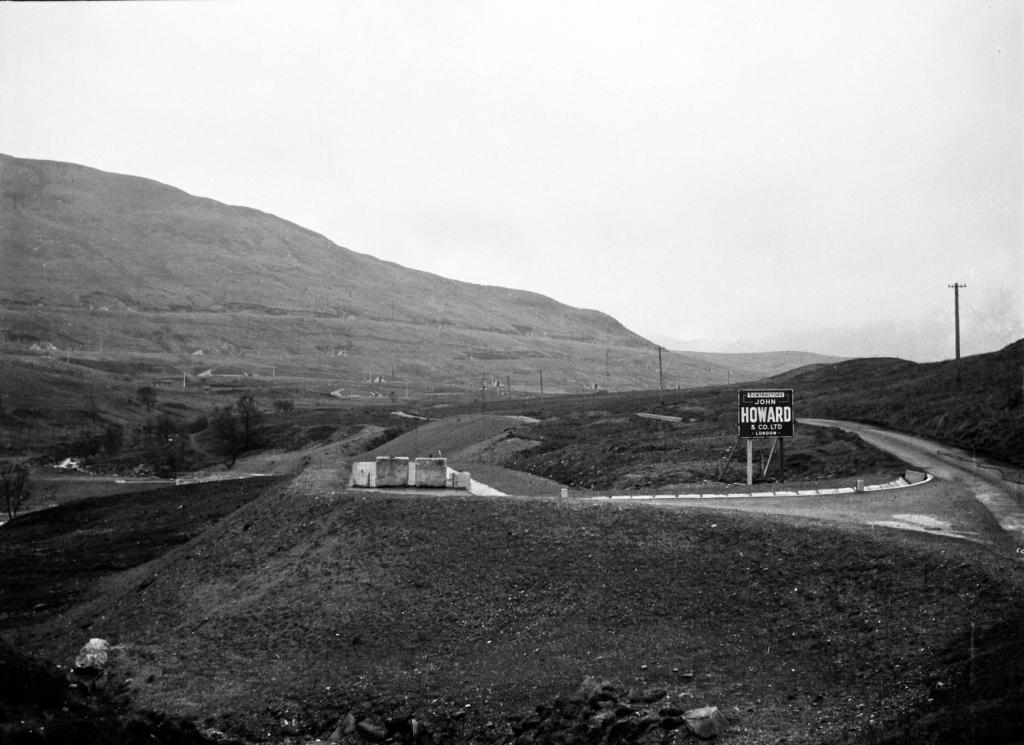
Glen Douglas munitions depot being constructed in 1966, showing tunnel entries into hillside

The facility was built between 1962 and 1966. As of 1989, it served NATO as a pre-positioned wartime ammunition depot, storing around 40,000 tons of missiles, depth charges, and conventional shells. It is now used only by the UK. The depot lies in Glen Douglas, a 6-mile (9.7 km) glen through which the Douglas Water flows east to Loch Lomond. The depot itself is near the glen's head, less than a mile from Loch Long. Arrochar is the nearest village.

In the 1970s, a jetty was built at Glen Mallan on Loch Long, linked to the depot via a Ministry of Defence (MoD) road.

It was known as NATO Armament Depot Glen Douglas and was used for munitions storage by the Royal Navy, the United States and the Netherlands. In 1993 the US withdrew from the site and the capacity was taken up by Royal Air Force munitions which were previously based at RAF Chilmark in Wiltshire, the RAF's last munitions depot prior to its closure in 1995.

In January 2003, the aircraft carrier HMS Ark Royal docked at the Glen Mallan jetty to stock up on supplies ahead of the impending invasion of Iraq. With the tacit backing of trade union ASLEF, Motherwell based EWS drivers working on a MoD contract refused to transport munitions to the depot, in opposition to what they branded a "rush to war". The drivers' action was supported in an Early Day Motion in the House of Commons signed by 25 MPs.

== Facilities ==
The depot covers an area of 226 hectares (2.26 km^{2}) and contained 56 magazines built into a hillside, capable of storing 40,000 cubic metres of conventional weapons, typically bombs, various types of ammunition, explosives and pyrotechnics. It was originally built for NATO between 1962 and 1966, but is now only used by the UK MOD.

In 2024, the MOD announced they would demolish 16 buildings that had exceeded their life expectancy and were no longer used. It had been considered to be the largest munitions store in Western Europe, but now DM Kineton is.

=== Northern Ammunition Jetty ===
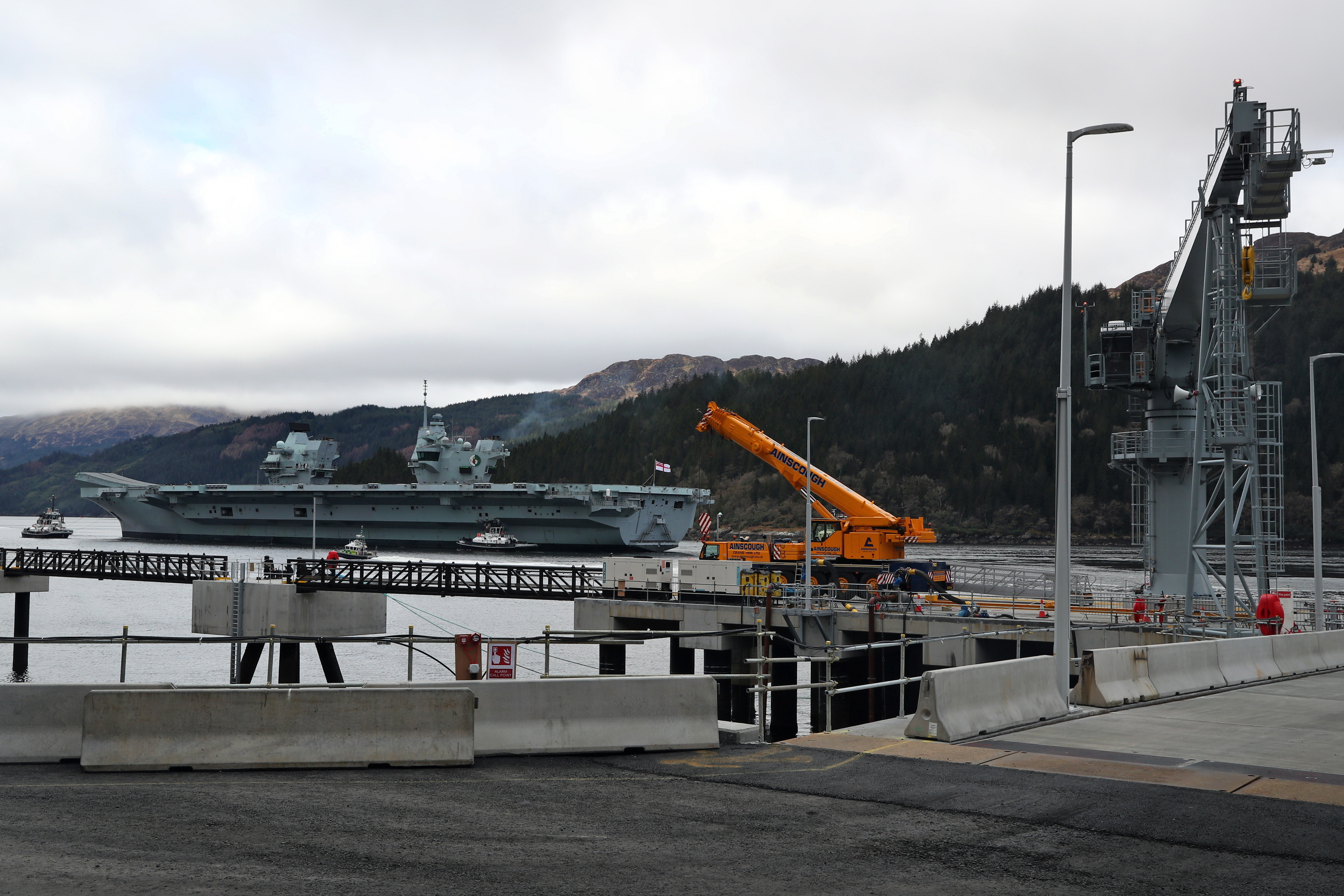
HMS Queen Elizabeth at the newly-rebuilt Northern Ammunition Jetty, March 2021

The Northern Ammunition Jetty (also known as Glen Mallan Jetty) is located on the edge of Loch Long, around 3 miles south of the main depot, to which it is connected by a military road which climbs along the western flank of Craggan Hill. The jetty is capable of accommodating a variety of Royal Navy and Royal Fleet Auxiliary vessels so that they can be loaded and unloaded with munitions as well as other provisions such as food and spare parts. The explosives license for the jetty allows up to 440 tonnes of explosives to be handled there. In 2020-21 the jetty was rebuilt to serve the Queen Elizabeth-class aircraft carriers.

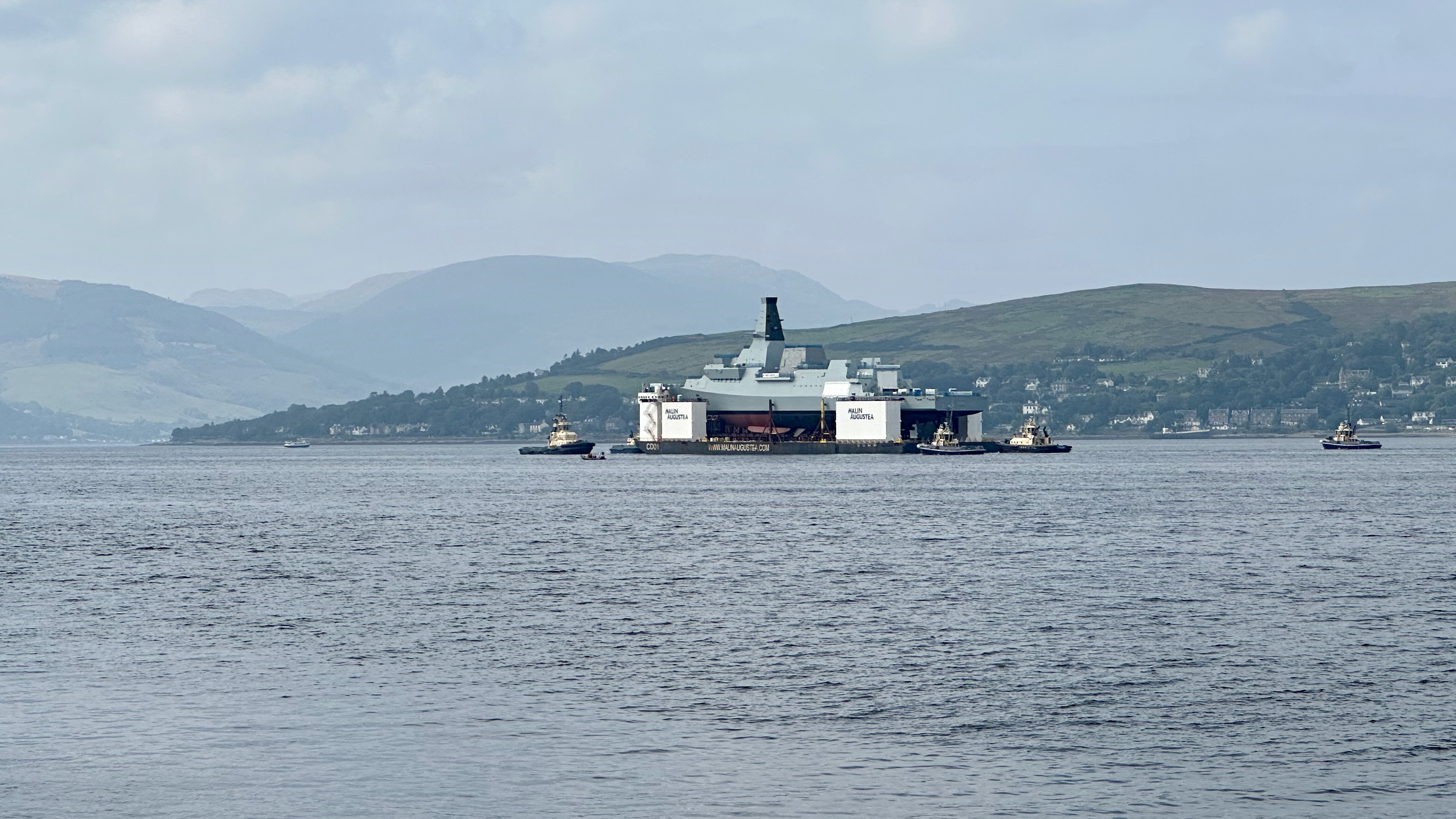
30 August 2024, HMS Cardiff heading into Loch Long on semi-submersible launch barge Malin Augustea CD01, for launching at the Glen Mallan jetty, about 34 miles (55 km) from Govan.

Type 26 frigates are being built at the BAE Systems Maritime shipyard at Govan, then transferred onto the semi-submersible heavy-lift barge Malin Augustea CD01, and taken down the Clyde then up Loch Long to the Glen Mallan jetty, to be floated off the barge for a gentle controlled launch. They are then taken by tugs upriver to the BAE Scotstoun shipyard for fitting out.

=== Rail connection ===
The depot is served by a branch railway line to the West Highland Line at the former Glen Douglas Halt railway station.

== See also ==
- Royal Naval Armaments Depot Coulport
