= HMS Glasgow (1707) =

History

Scotland
- Name: Royal Mary
- Builder: Built on the Thames
- Launched: 1696
- Fate: Transferred to Royal Navy 1 May 1707

History

Great Britain
- Name: HMS Glasgow
- Commissioned: 1707
- Fate: Sold on 20 August 1719

General characteristics
- Type: 24-gun sixth rate
- Tons burthen: 284 bm
- Length: 92 ft 6 in (28.2 m) gundeck; 77 ft 0 in (23.5 m) keel for tonnage
- Beam: 26 ft 4 in (8.0 m) for tonnage
- Depth of hold: 10 ft 18 in (3.5 m)
- Sail plan: ship-rigged
- Armament: 20 × 6-pdrs on wooden trucks (UD); 4 × 4-pdr on wooden trucks (QD)

HMS Glasgow was the Royal Scottish Navy vessel Royal Mary transferred to the Royal Navy by the Act of Union of 1707. Her design was based on the standardize 20-gun sixth rates. After commissioning she was assigned to Home Waters. She took a privateer in 1708 and another in 1712. She was sold in 1719.

Glasgow was the first vessel of this name in the Royal Navy.

== Construction ==
She was built for the Scottish Navy on the Thames in 1696 then transferred by the Act of Union to the Royal Navy in 1707. Her gun deck was 92 feet 6 inches (28.2 metres) with her keel reported for tonnage of 77 feet 0 inches (23.5 metres). Her breadth was 26 feet 4 inches (8.0 metres) and depth of hold 10 feet 18 inches (3.5 metres). Her builder's measure was 284 tons. She carried the standard armament of a sixth rate of twenty 6-pounders on the upper deck (UD) and four 4-pounders on the quarterdeck (QD). The 4-pounders were removed in August 1714.

== Commissioned service ==
She was commissioned in 1707 under the command of Commander James Hamilton, RN (promoted to captain in December 1707) for service at the Nore. James Hamilton had been her captain in the Scottish Navy holding a captain's rank under warrant of Queen Anne since 7 November 1705. Commander Thomas Egerton, RN, was in command from January 1708 followed by Commander Walter Massey, RN, from February 1708 with Admiral Byng's Fleet in the Downs and North Sea. On 1 May 1708 she took the privateer, La Fidele in the North Sea. Commander Thomas Dennett, RN (promoted captain January 1713) took command. She captured privateer, L'Amazone in the North Sea on 30 May 1712. In 1713 she was on quarantine guard in the Downs. In 1714 she underwent a hull repair at Portsmouth at a cost of £634.5.71/4 (Note: A total cost accounting for inflation of approximately £107,100 in today's money.) for building. Her final commander was Captain William Lloyd, RN, in February 1715 for service in the English Channel followed by the North Sea in 1717. She sailed with a Baltic Convoy in 1718.

== Disposition ==
She was sold at Deptford for £115 (Note: A total cost accounting for inflation of approximately £19,400 in today's money.) on 20 August 1719.
