= HMS Dumbarton Castle (1707) =

Royal Scottish Naval Vessel

History

Scotland
- Name: Dumbarton Castle
- Builder: Built on the Thames
- Launched: 1696
- Fate: Transferred to Royal Navy 29 November 1707

History

Great Britain
- Name: HMS Dumbarton Castle
- Commissioned: 28 November 1707
- Captured: 24 April 1708
- Fate: Captured by French off Waterford

General characteristics
- Type: 24-gun Sixth Rate
- Tons burthen: 284 bm
- Length: 92 ft 6 in (28.2 m) gundeck; 77 ft 0 in (23.5 m) keel for tonnage
- Beam: 26 ft 4 in (8.0 m) for tonnage
- Depth of hold: 10 ft 18 in (3.5 m)
- Sail plan: ship-rigged
- Armament: 20 × 6-pdrs on wooden trucks (UD); 4 × 4-pdr on wooden trucks (QD)

HMS Dumbarton Castle was the Royal Scottish Naval vessel of the same name transferred to the Royal Navy by the Act of Union of 1707. Her design was based on the standardize 20-gun sixth rates building in England at the time. After commissioning she was assigned to Home Waters. She was captured by the French in April 1708 off Waterford.

Dumbarton Castle was the first named vessel in the Royal Navy.

== Construction ==
She was built for the Scottish Navy on the Thames in 1696 then transferred by the Act of Union to the Royal Navy in 1707. No information is available on her parameters, however, her specifications were probably based on the Maidstone group that was being built at this time. She carried the standard armament of a sixth rate of twenty 6-pounders on the upper deck (UD) and four 4-pounders on the quarterdeck (QD).

== Commissioned service ==
She was commissioned on 28 November 1707 under the command of Commander Mathew Campbell, RN.

== Disposition ==
She was captured by the French 44-gun Le Jersey off Waterford on 26 April 1708.
