= Type 997 Artisan radar =

British naval radar system

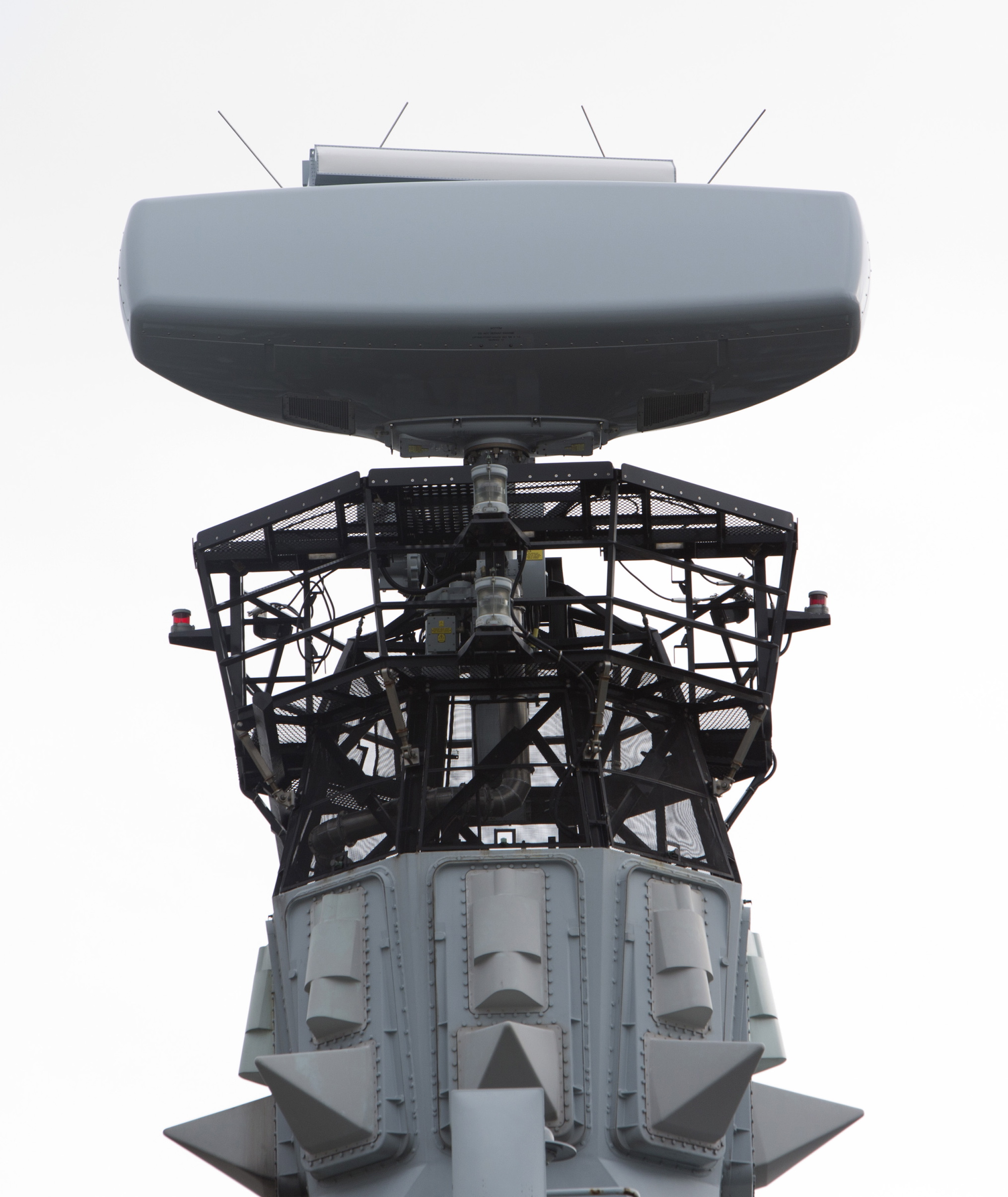
Type 997 Radar on HMS Argyll

The Type 997 Artisan (Advanced Radar Target Indication Situational Awareness and Navigation) is a medium-range air and surface surveillance active electronically scanned array 3D radar developed and built by BAE Systems for the United Kingdom's Royal Navy. It has been fitted to all 13 Type 23 frigates, former HMS Ocean, former HMS Bulwark, former HMS Albion, HMS Queen Elizabeth and HMS Prince of Wales.

The Type 997 Artisan has a range of 200 m – 200 km (110 nmi) at 30 RPM and is reportedly capable of tracking more than 900 targets at once. BAE Systems states that Artisan is capable of detecting objects as small as a tennis ball and travelling at three times the speed of sound more than 25km away. Artisan can cut through radio interference equal to 10,000 mobile phone signals. This modern radar can defend against complex radar jamming.

== Operators ==
List of countries that use or will use the Artisan:

- Brazil – Used on NAM Atlântico and the NDM Oiapoque.
- United Kingdom – Used on the 10 Type 23 Frigate and 8 Type 26 Frigates, as well the aircraft carriers HMS Queen Elizabeth and HMS Prince of Wales.
- Taiwan – Will be used on a new family of light frigates and are being refit to the 6 Kang Ding-class frigates as part of an AAW upgrade.

== See also ==
- S1850M radar
- SAMPSON radar
