= Sonar 2087 =

Towed array sonar

The Sonar 2087 (sometimes shortened to S2087) is a towed array sonar developed by Thales Underwater Systems (TUS). Manufactured in the United Kingdom, it is the British variant of the company's CAPTAS-4 manufactured in Brest, France, and part of its CAPTAS (Combined Active and Passive Towed Array Sonar) line of products. The Sonar 2087 replaced the older Sonar 2031 in the Royal Navy and equips the five active Type 23 frigates. It is also expected to equip the Royal Navy's Type 26 frigates currently in production. The S2087 is also fitted on the three Chilean Type 23 frigates acquired from the Royal Navy.

The S2087 is a Low Frequency Active Sonar (LFAS) and consists of both active and passive sonar arrays. Thales describes the system as "a towed-array that enables Type 23 frigates to hunt the latest submarines at considerable distances and locate them beyond the range at which they [submarines] can launch an attack".

HMS Sutherland was the first British vessel to be equipped with the S2087. The latter's first operational test after its integration took place during the "Auriga" deployment in 2010, for which HMS Sutherland was chosen to act as the Anti-Submarine Warfare Commander. The exercise involved American, British, Canadian and French naval assets.

A new programme named Spearhead was launched in October 2022 to further develop the Sonar 2087 by adding new active and passive variable depth sonar capability to the existing system on Type 23 frigates.

== See also ==
- Sonar
- Surveillance Towed Array Sensor System
