= Future Commando Force =

Modernisation programme and future model for British Royal Marines

The Future Commando Force (FCF) is an in-progress (as of February 2022) modernisation programme and transformation of the role and operations of the Royal Marines. The FCF essentially retasks 40 Commando and 45 Commando with forming two Littoral Response Groups (LRGs) which will be permanently deployed, though other units from UK Commando Force are also included in the composition of LRGs, as well as changing the role and operations of the Royal Marines and the equipment and tactics they use.

The FCF concept was created before 2019, when the first exercises and experiments with the FCF began. It was reinforced in the Defence in a Competitive Age command paper, which followed the Integrated Review. The paper describes the Royal Marines as a forward-deployed maritime special operations capable force. The force will relieve United Kingdom Special Forces (UKSF), operating in smaller teams within grey zones.

The emphasis on the littoral role of the Royal Marines strongly links the FCF to the Littoral Strike concept, which is being developed and implemented by the LRGs. The FCF is also strongly linked to the "Autonomous Advanced Force" concept by its emphasis on leveraging new technologies to augment commandos on operations. A series of exercises from 2019–present (as of November 2021) have been key to developing the FCF, chiefly with experimentation.

As of late 2024, the future of the Future Commando Force concept was at best uncertain since, in November 2024, the newly elected Labour government indicated that both of the Royal Navy's Albion-class landing platform dock vessels would be removed from service by March 2025. Simultaneously, the Royal Fleet Auxiliary was suffering severe crewing problems, as well as a labour force disruption, meaning that the manning of its Bay-class landing ship dock vessels was facing serious challenges. This made the future of the Commando Force concept dependent on the construction of the planned joint-British-Dutch future ATS-class amphibious warfare ship. These vessels were chosen for procurement in the British Government's 2026 Defence Investment Plan which cancelled the previously envisaged Multi-role Support Ships in favor of the less expensive ATS vessels.

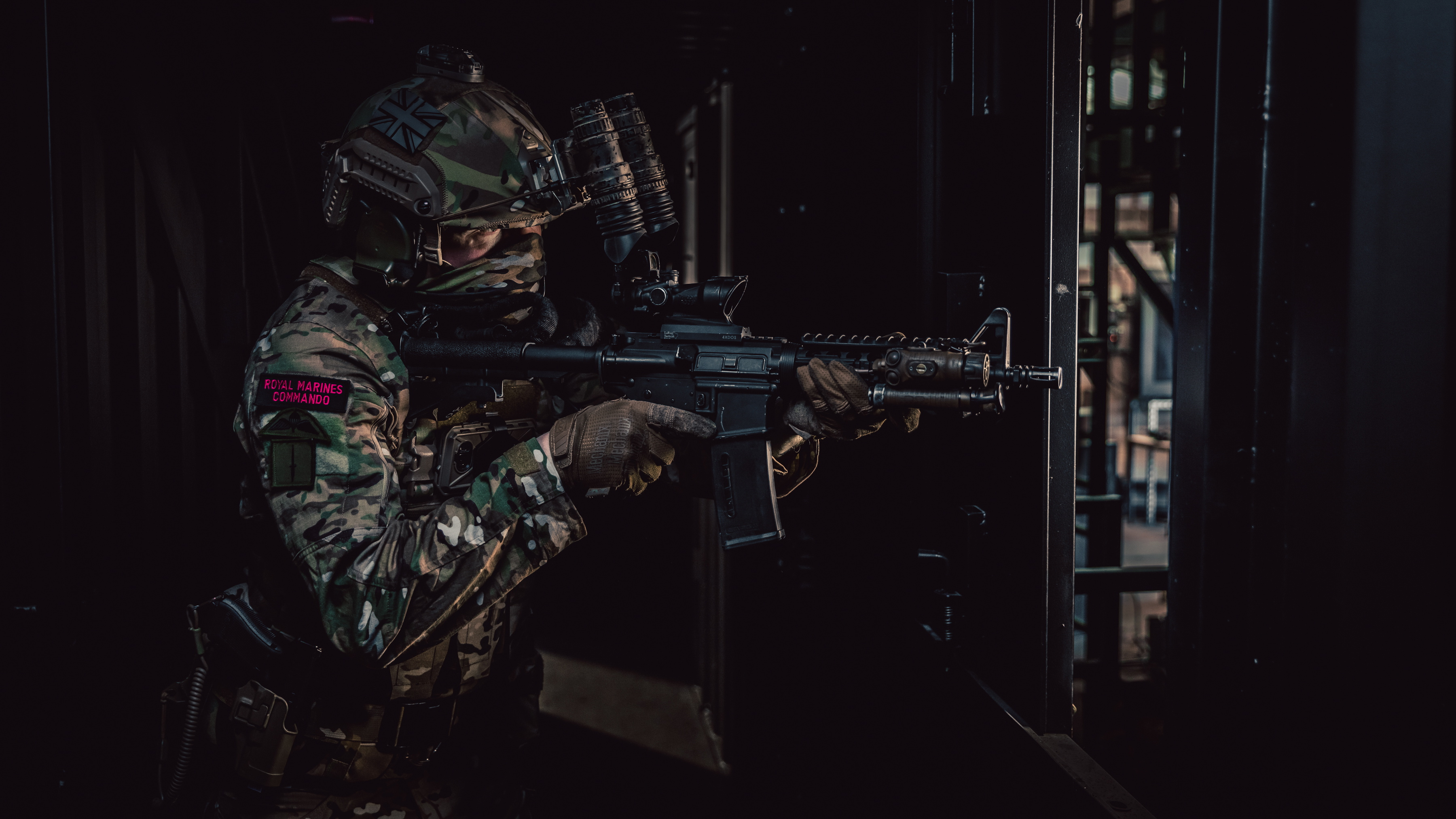
The new Royal Marines uniform introduced as part of the FCF.

== Concept ==
The Royal Navy will invest £40m more over the next four years to develop our Future Commando Force ... to deliver a more agile and lethal littoral strike capability. Forward deployed to respond rapidly to crises, this special operations-capable force will operate alongside our allies and partners in areas of UK interest, ready to strike from the sea, pre-empt and deter sub-threshold activity, and counter state threats.

— Defence in a Competitive Age

Given that the FCF programme is ongoing, its form has not been finalised, and is subject to change. Currently, it models the Royal Marines as a new special operations capable maritime force. This force is to be expeditionary, provide a rapid response ability, and able work in littoral zones and grey zones. Moreover, the FCF was created, in part, to counter coastal A2AD systems.

The FCF programme has seen an increased focus on using technology to augment Royal Marine commandos, including tactical tablet kits, drones such as small Remotely Piloted Aircraft Systems (RPAS) and cargo drones, throwbots, and AI-enabled autonomous systems. Autonomous systems using AI technologies such as computer vision will also connect in mesh networks and MANETs to supply ISTAR to the Royal Marines in a single integrated platform. These new technologies are used to increase the effectiveness and lethality of Royal Marines, while modern C4ISR/C5I equipment is used to enable more agile and decentralised operations and integrated with autonomous systems to inform and assist decision-making and commando operations, in keeping with the Royal Navy's wider Advanced Autonomous Force concept.

The renewal of equipment extends into new clothing and personal weapons for Royal Marines. Furthermore, new vehicles such as quadbikes and ships were trialled in exercises to develop the FCF as well as novel tactics, including an increased use of deception, working in teams of reduced sizes and of different compositions, and operating with greater agility and autonomy.

The FCF is being developed in exercises; see the history section below for a detailed timeline. There have been numerous reports that there is not currently sufficient funding for the programme to be successful. In addition to this, it has been estimated the FCF would have ~4,000 Royal Marines personnel from the existing force of ~7,000.

== Structure ==
The FCF is to form around the LRGs, specialised Royal Navy task groups that provide rapid strike capabilities in littoral zones and to counter grey zone and sub-threshold activity. They were to have been LRG(North), based in Europe and responsible for the Atlantic, Baltic, Arctic Ocean, and Mediterranean (i.e. north of the Suez Canal), and LRG(South), based in Oman and responsible for the Indo-Pacific and Persian Gulf (i.e. south of the Suez). The LRGs were the implementation of the Navy's Littoral Strike concept.

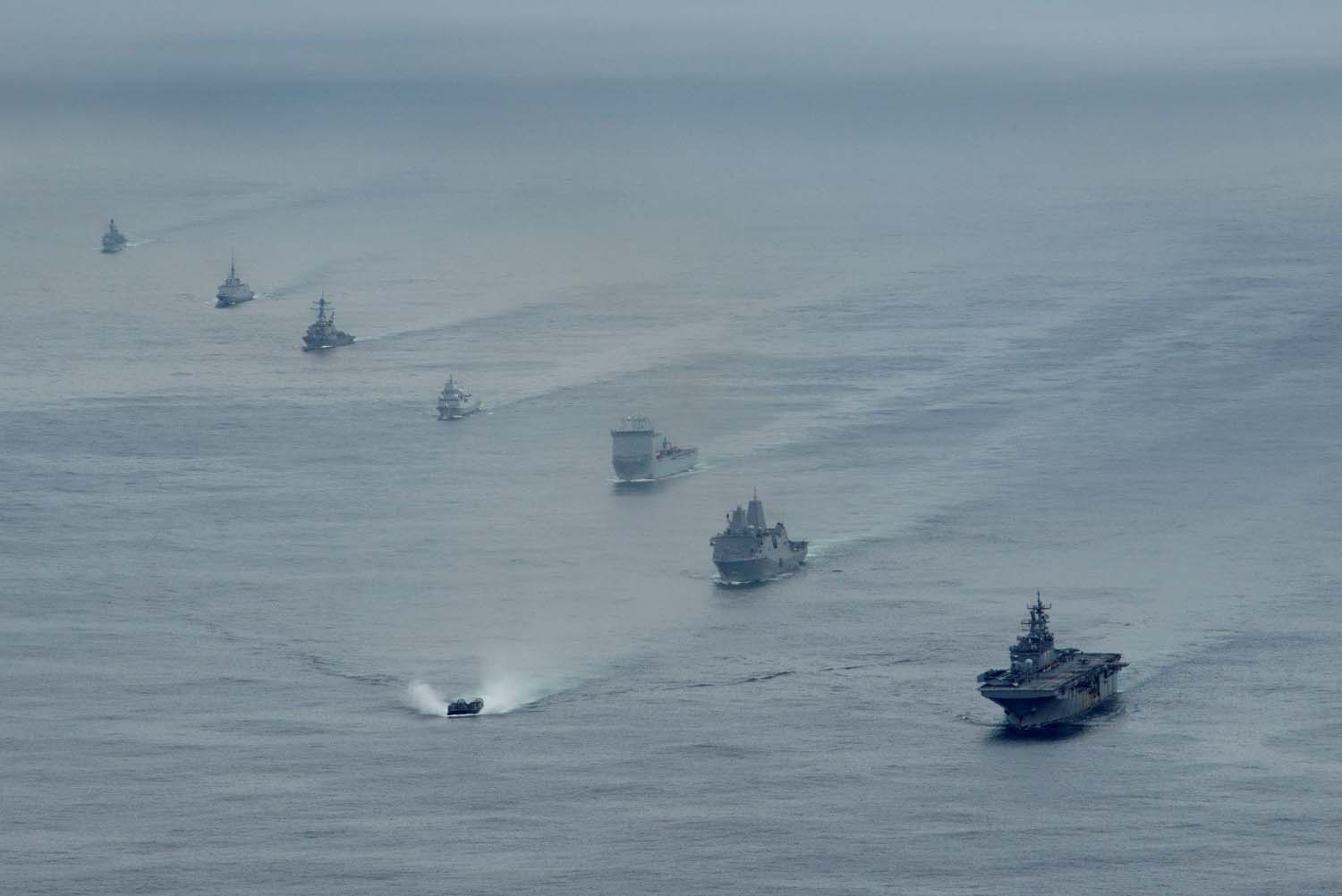
LRG(North) with USS Iwo Jima (LHD-7).

45 Commando and 40 Commando were each to contribute a company to form LRG(North) and LRG(South), respectively, in the form of new Strike Companies in the FCF - hence the name of the Vanguard Strike Company which tested FCF concepts in exercises. Furthermore, the structure of the FCF was outlined in evidence given to the House of Commons Defence Committee report We're going to need a bigger Navy as part of its inquiry The Navy: purpose and procurement:

Future Commando Force is reshaping each Commando into 4 STRIKE Companies, each of which, completed with supports from across 3rd Commando Brigade, makes up a Littoral Strike Unit (LSU), operating dispersed and embarked indicatively on a single ship. Multiple LSUs are meant to form a LRG. A minimum of 2 ships per group is needed; an Albion[-class] plus a [Bay[-class] is a reasonable composition and each Commando (45 Cdo for the North, 40 Cdo for the South) will be able to rotate the 2 forward-deployed companies to sustain the enduring commitment.

— Gabriele Molinelli

Bay-class landing ships, however, are being upgraded and used only temporarily in place of the new Anglo-Dutch amphibious transport vessels which are planned to enter service in the 2030s.

The composition of a Littoral Response Group.

=== Summary ===
Each of the two LRGs were to consist of:

- Littoral Strike Unit (LSU) of ~ 250 personnel
  - Rotating "strike" company from 40 or 45 Commando
  - Supporting personnel from the rest of 3 Commando Brigade
- Albion-class Landing Platform Dock (LPD)
- Bay-class Landing Ship Dock (LSD), termed a Littoral Strike Ship (LSS)
- Type 45 destroyer escort
- Further supporting ships and vessels

However, in November 2024, it was announced that both Albion-class vessels were to be removed from service by March 2025.

== History ==
=== Background ===
In April 2017, the First Sea Lord, Admiral Sir Philip Jones, announced that 42 Commando, one of the Commando units of 3 Commando Brigade, would become specialised in maritime operations. The Littoral Strike and FCF concepts were established sometime before 2019, being mentioned in various publications from the British government and armed forces in late 2018. The internal documents Designing for the Future – A Transformational Concept, authored by the Commandant General Royal Marines on 2 March 2018, and Generating and Operating 2 x Littoral Strike Groups, authored more generally within 3 Commando Brigade on 10 December 2018, further detailed the Littoral Strike and FCF concepts, and followed wider discussions on how 40 and 45 Cdo should be restructured that had been ongoing since at least 2017. Further development of both concepts was, in part, likely to help implement Boris Johnson's post-Brexit policy of "Global Britain", given the FCF's nature of forward deployment and special operations capability, the latter of which is pivotal to modern warfare.

=== 2019 ===
On 11 February 2019, then-Defence Secretary Gavin Williamson described upcoming changes to the British Armed Forces, including the FCF, Littoral Strike concept, and LRGs. He also used the speech to announce plans to buy two "Littoral Strike Ships" in support of the LRGs.

In April 2019, A Company, 40 Commando, and 1 Assault Group Royal Marines carried out Exercise Commando Warrior, which trialled the use of Unmanned Aerial Systems (UASs) and Unmanned Ground Vehicles (UGVs) in support of a beach assault, and tactical operations as a whole. It involved using integrated data from both systems being monitored remotely to test the "Autonomous Advanced Force" concept.

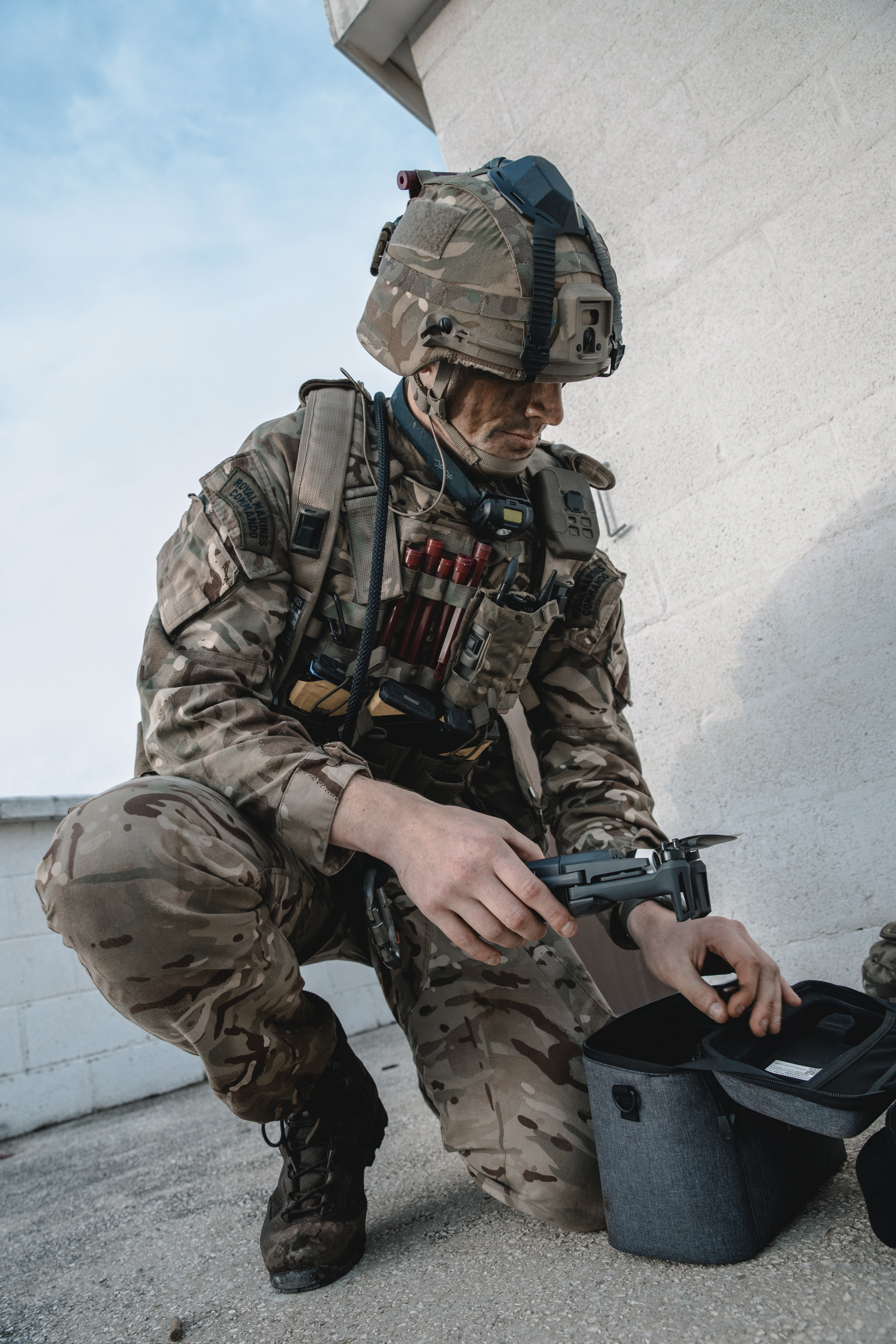
A Royal Marine using a UAS during Exercise Serpent Rock.

In May 2019, members of 40 Commando began to carry out Exercise Commando Warrior Two, in which marines tested further technologies including AI-enabled systems, situational awareness pads, Android Tactical Assault Kit (ATAK) tablets, and new radios. 40 Commando again further developed the FCF during Exercise Talisman Sabre, taking place from June 2019 in Australia, in which they acted as an advanced reconnaissance and raiding force ahead of amphibious landings.

In November 2019, it was reported that the Royal Marines would adopt the C8 SFW, already in service with UKSF, as their standard rifle. During the Autumn of 2019, the Royal Marines further trialled the FCF concept, enabling a larger conventional force from the United States Marine Corps (USMC) during the regular training Exercise Green Dagger.

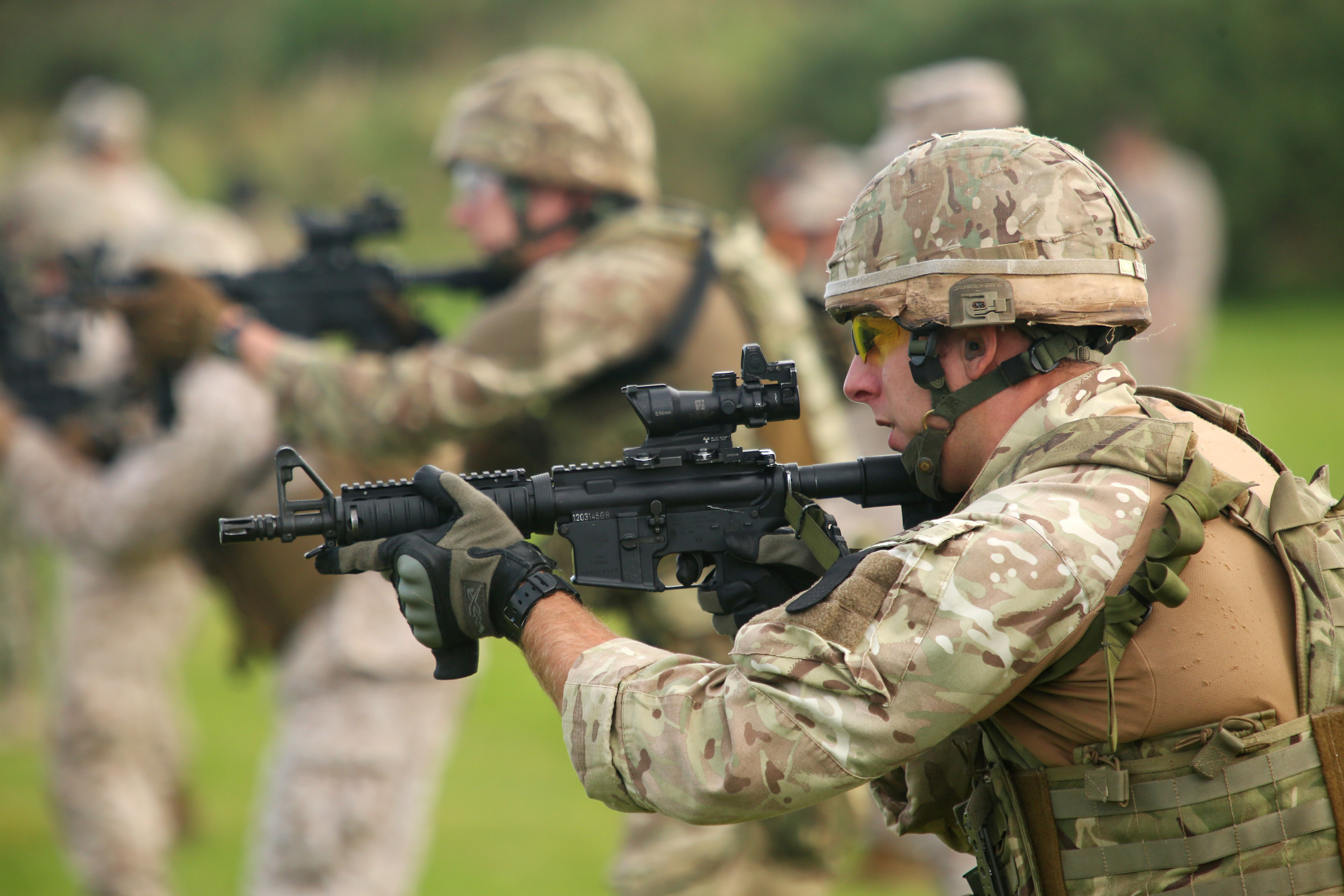
A Royal Marine from 43 Commando Fleet Protection Group Royal Marines using the L119A1 variant of the C8 in 2014.

=== 2020 ===
In January 2020, marines of 47 Commando (Raiding Group) Royal Marines and 45 Commando performed exercises including a landing with their Norwegian counterparts and their Skjold-class corvettes, which were found to suit the FCF model, ahead of Exercise Cold Response 20, as well as testing other novel equipment for the FCF in "Project EVE". The exercise was, however, cancelled due to the COVID-19 pandemic. In February 2020, marines of A Company, 40 Commando, experimented with Polaris DAGOR vehicles. The DAGOR and Polaris MRZR vehicles were both used in FCF trials.

In March 2020, parts of 47 Commando (Raiding Group) Royal Marines experimented with the use of jet suits for use in ship boarding operations and carried out Exercise Autonomous Advance Force, which used autonomous equipment to test the "Autonomous Advanced Force" concept. The COVID-19 pandemic notably took place during the development of the FCF concept, with the World Health Organization declaring a pandemic on 11 March 2020, and the first UK national lockdown being declared on 23 March 2020. The Royal Marines and British Armed Forces as a whole had to adjust operations in light of the pandemic, which therefore affected the development of the FCF.

On 5 June 2020, The Royal Navy announced it would test a new helmet camera from its MarWorks specialists and Visual Engineering. In late June 2020, it was announced the Royal Marines would be transitioning from their existing Multi-Terrain Pattern uniform to a new MultiCam uniform made by Crye Precision. The new uniform features the White Ensign on its sleeve to signify the connection of the Royal Marines to the Royal Navy for the first time as well as British commando insignia inspired by the original designs made in World War II.

In July 2020, 43 Commando Fleet Protection Group Royal Marines trialled the use of throwbots and handheld drones. On 6 July 2020, it was reported that development on the MarWorks helmet camera was continuing and that 40 Commando were to begin testing prototypes. On 20 July 2020, it was announced that a new Vanguard Strike Company would form to further develop the FCF concept during trials before trials in the remainder of 2020 and would deploy for the first time in 2021.

In September 2020, it was reported that marines from 40 Commando had been experimenting with potential tactics to be used in the FCF, including working in smaller teams of 4, three of which make a troop of 12. Forbes reported the Royal Marines were acquiring an AI-enabled autonomous air system as part of the FCF, aligning with the "Autonomous Advanced Force" concept. In mid-September, the Royal Navy began the Littoral Response Group (Experimentation) (LRG(X)) deployment, which aimed to test the Littoral Strike concept and experiment with tactics for future LRGs. The LRG(X) task group reached Gibraltar by 21 September 2020, where they practised techniques including abseiling and fast roping before the task group moved on.

The LRG(X) task group reached Cyprus by the end of October, where they began experimenting with the use of drones, as part of Autonomous Advance Force 3. The marines of LRG(X) went on to experiment with drones, video links, quadbikes, jet skis, ATAK tablets, and other novel equipment during the exercises in Cyprus, including Exercise Olympus Warrior. Soon after, 43 Commando Fleet Protection Group Royal Marines continued experimentation with throwbots, RPAS, and ATAKs during Exercise Serpent Rock in Gibraltar. Marines from 45 Commando also used drones and ATAKs during training in Wales.

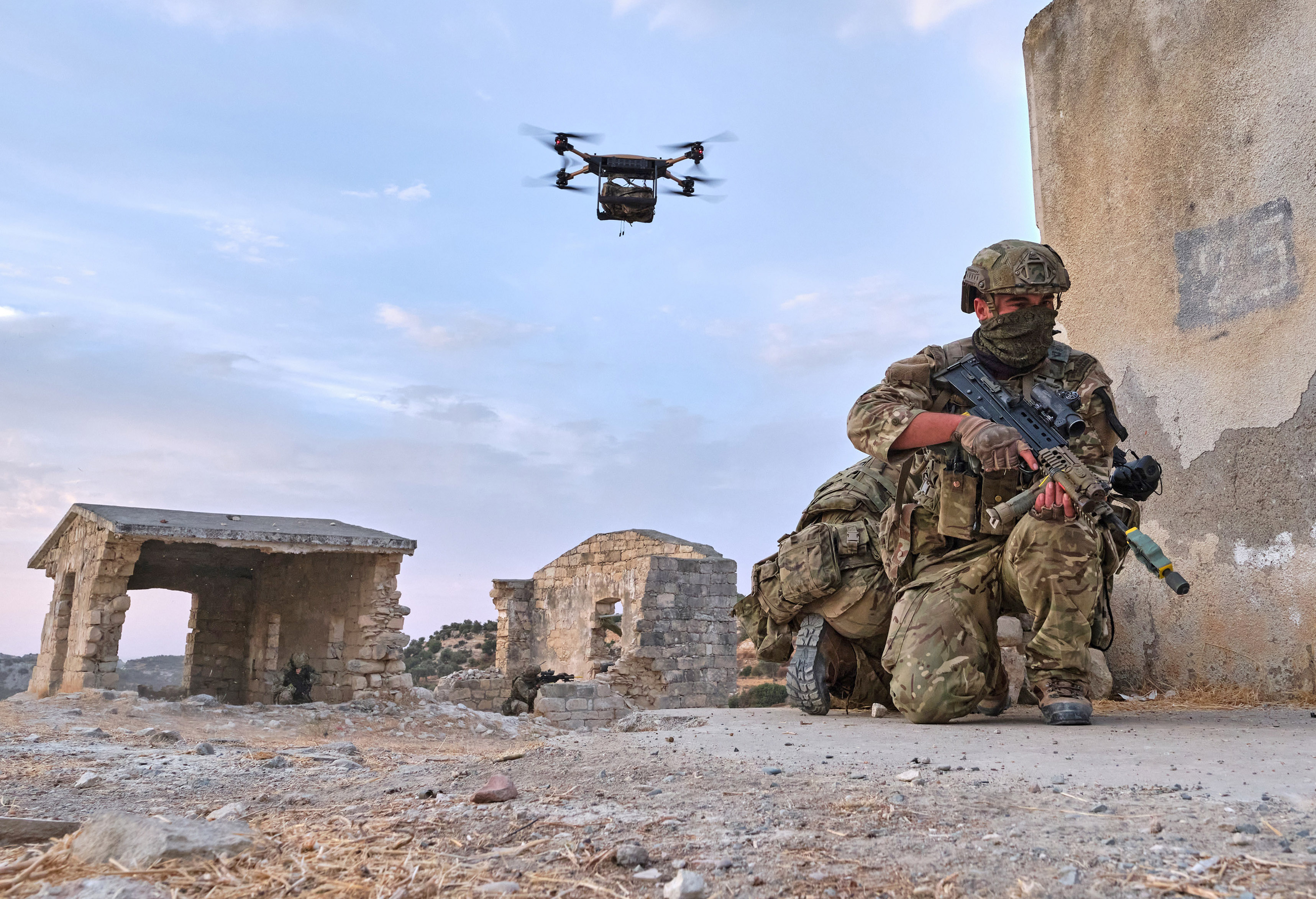
Royal Marines of 40 Commando working with a Malloy T150 cargo drone during Exercise Olympus Warrior.

In early December 2020, marines from 45 Commando further tested quadbikes, using them to move mortars rapidly. On 4 December 2020, HMS Albion and the remainder of the LRG(X) task group arrived back in the UK, finishing the deployment. Later in December, marines from C Company, 40 Commando performed deep penetration missions in the Mojave Desert with a team from United States Army Special Forces working against an opposing force from the USMC and worked in 12-man teams to further experiment with the FCF concept.

=== 2021 ===
In early March, it was reported that marines from A company, 40 Commando, were experimenting with Virtual Reality (VR) technology to augment existing training methods. Soon after, marines from 45 Commando experimented further with Small unit tactics in Norway. On 18 March 2021, Forces News reported that the Vanguard Strike Company, from marines of 40 Commando, had been performing exercises including night-time shooting and experimenting with working in 12-man teams. The Integrated Review was published on 16 March 2021, followed by the corresponding defence command paper Defence in a Competitive Age on 22 March 2021. The latter further described the FCF and Littoral strike concepts and LRGs in greater detail, announced £200 million would be invested into the FCF over the following decade, and, being a command paper, reinforces that they will continue to be developed to completion.

We will also draw on special operations capable forces from an Army Special Operations Brigade, the Future Commando Force and elsewhere in Defence to conduct special operations to train, advise and accompany partners in high threat environments.

— Defence in a competitive age

Between May and June, the FCF and LRG concepts were further developed during the Littoral Response Group (North) deployment to Scotland, Norway, and the Baltic. The Army confirmed the contracts for the Challenger 3 were signed on 7 May 2021, and went on to state the new tank would be able to operate with the FCF in littoral and coastal regions.

Later in May, members of 29th Commando Regiment Royal Artillery and 148 (Meiktila) Battery Royal Artillery carried out Exercise Fleet Battle Problem, in which it was examined how artillery fire and airstrikes could be coordinated within the FCF. In late May, the Commando Logistic Regiment carried out Exercise Green Dragon to better understand how members of the FCF would remain supplied on operations.

In July, marines of 40 Commando and 42 Commando performed mock raids using drone "swarms", used to resupply the marines, for the first time as part of Autonomous Advance Force 4.0. Later in July, marines from 40 Commando continued trials of the Polaris MRZR, with potential use to transport "light strike teams". Further, marines from B Company, 40 Commando, took part in Exercise Talisman Sabre in Australia, where they continued to practice working in 12-man teams and with drones as they acted as an advance force ahead of the main landings.

Ending in late September, Exercise Dynamic Mariner 21/Joint Warrior 21-2, which saw HMS Prince of Wales being declared fully operational, involved FCF development. In late October, marines from 40 Commando took part in Exercise Green Dagger alongside the USMC, in which they used FCF tactics and explored how small commando teams would be resupplied, as part of the recently created Littoral Response Group (South) of the LRGs. It was reported that the USMC suffered a severe "defeat" to the Royal Marines, however, this is disputed and remains unclear. During the exercise, marines were pictured using the novel NightFighter X counter-UAV system.

We are more sophisticated, more lethal, special operations capable, and will soon be more deployed than ever before. ... We're new, we're different, and we're the future.

In December, a publication from the House of Commons Defence Committee, following its inquiry into the Royal Navy as a whole, expressed concern at insufficient funding for the FCF: "we are concerned that the Future Commando Force and the Littoral Response Groups are not properly resourced to continue amphibious operations". An October publication from King's College London's Centre for Defence Studies detailed how the FCF, if replacing the existing formation of the Royal Marines altogether, would represent a cut in personnel of ~43%: "...if this entails a reduction in size, it also entails a reduction of the one UK force designed explicitly to be expeditionary...".

=== 2022 ===
In February 2022, a troop of new Royal Marines recruits passed training having been exposed to and trained in novel FCF tactics and concepts. Later in February, a report published from the National Audit Office found that "the New Medium Helicopter and Future Commando Force programmes ... are currently underfunded". This added to other reports of underfunding of the FCF programme, as well as other initiatives from the Integrated Review. The government later responded to the National Audit Office, restating the commitment to the FCF and creating LRGs, mentioning investments made into the initiatives and planned upgrades to ships.

It was reported that FCF tactics during Exercise Cold Response 2022, which took place from March to April. In June 2022, Brigadier Mark Totten OBE, the director of the FCF programme, described how the FCF would be made up of ~4,000 marines, focus on both the Arctic and Suez Canal areas, and would work alongside the Navy's UK Carrier Strike Group.

== See also ==
- Royal Marines
- Littoral Response Groups
- Defence in a Competitive Age
