= Littoral Response Group =

A Littoral Response Group (LRG) is a Royal Navy task group usually consisting of one or two amphibious warfare ships (supported by other Royal Navy elements if required and available), a company of Royal Marines and supporting elements primarily tasked with littoral warfare from the littoral areas. They were first deployed in 2020 and have been described by the Royal Navy as being more flexible and agile compared to previous amphibious task groups with an emphasis on forward-basing, precision strike capabilities, high mobility, modern command and control technology, networked autonomous systems and deception capabilities. Multiple LRGs were to be able to combine to form a more substantial Littoral Strike Group (LSG) and also join a UK Carrier Strike Group to form an Expeditionary Strike Force.

However, as of late 2024, the future of the entire LRG concept was at best uncertain since, in November 2024, the newly elected Labour government indicated that both of the Royal Navy's Albion-class landing platform dock vessels would be removed from service by March 2025. Simultaneously, the Royal Fleet Auxiliary was suffering severe crewing problems, as well as a labour force disruption, meaning the manning of its three Bay-class landing ship dock vessels was facing serious challenges. At the same time, it was also proving to be a challenge to keep the Royal Fleet Auxiliary's aging aviation support ship, RFA Argus, in service. In July 2025 it was reported that the Maritime and Coastguard Agency (MCA) and Lloyds Register (LR) had deemed Argus "unsafe to sail" meaning that, at minimum, further work would be required to render the 45-year old vessel seaworthy. In early 2026, it was confirmed that Argus was to be scrapped. These gaps brought into question the entire concept of the navy's ability to deploy two, and even one, littoral response groups.

== Background ==
The LRG concept responded to a global shift in interstate competition from total wars to persistence through limited positional warfare. It also responded to the proliferation of anti-ship missiles, man-portable air-defence systems (MANPADS) and sophisticated NPADS) and sophisticated Intelligence, Surveillance, and Reconnaissance capabilities which have rendered traditional large-scale amphibious assaults increasingly hazardous. This made them an unattractive option to seize and take control of ground in the littoral zone, an area of increased importance due to the rise in population centres and economic interests in those areas.

Whilst the LRG concept was first announced in 2019, the Royal Navy deployed similar task groups over the past decade as part of the Response Force Task Group, Joint Rapid Reaction Force and Joint Expeditionary Force. The LRG, however, is unique in that it had been designed to be forward-based and centred around the Future Commando Force.

The first LRG was deployed on an experimental deployment in September 2020, named LRG(X), which took place in Cyprus. The deployment consisted of the Albion-class landing platform dock HMS Albion, Bay-class landing ship dock RFA Lyme Bay and Type 45 destroyer HMS Dragon, along with a company of Royal Marines. The LSG trialed 40 experimental concepts, including the use of drones to resupply equipment to commandos on the ground.

== Overview ==
A Littoral Response Group is defined as a “bespoke force assigned to a geographic area, that contains dedicated shipping, helicopters and boats".

— Integrated Review: The Defence Tilt to the IndoPacific

=== Role ===
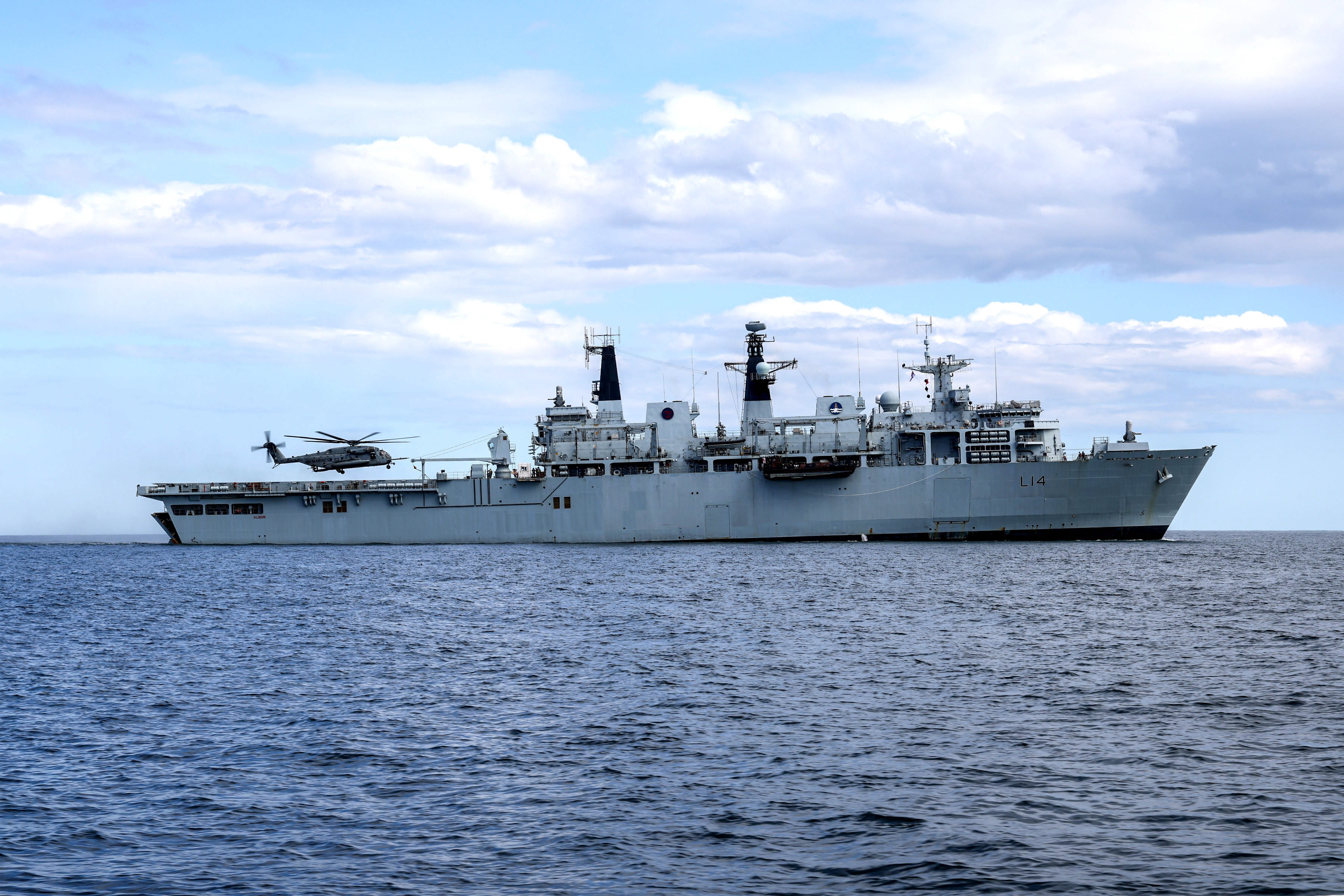
HMS Albion during the LRG(N) deployment Exercise Wader (May 2021)

The LRG concept provided the UK options in an era of sub-threshold competition, a "grey zone" where nation states and actors compete in a hostile manner using tactics below the threshold of war. They could also be used to carry out raiding missions, demonstrations of force, evacuations and precision strikes inland from the littoral zone.

The Royal United Services Institute provided four example uses for a Royal Navy LRG in its publication, titled Requirements for the UK’s Amphibious Forces in the Future Operating Environment, which are:

- The removal of a Russian force that has landed on the Norwegian archipelago of Svalbard to prevent the installation of area denial (A2AD) systems.
- A reinforcement to prevent the seizure of Gotland, Åland or Bornholm in the Baltic by Russia.
- The seizure of the Iranian island of Abu Musa in the Strait of Hormuz to prevent mine-laying and attacks on commercial shipping by the Iranians.
- Intervention in Hodeidah, Yemen to prevent a humanitarian catastrophe and reduce the threat to shipping in the Red Sea.

=== Composition ===
An LRG typically consisted of an Albion-class landing platform dock and a Bay-class landing ship dock, along with a company of 250 Royal Marines. However, as of 2024, both Albion-class vessels were being maintained in reserve and the MOD's Minister of State, James Cartlidge, stated that it was anticipated that, although HMS Bulwark was to complete a long-term refit in 2024, she would nevertheless only be activated "if required". In late 2024, it was indicated that both Albion-class vessels would be removed from service by March 2025, thus ending this capability in the Royal Navy.

In 2021, the Ministry of Defence announced it would be investing £50 million into upgrading one of the Bay-class landing ship docks to better facilitate its role within the LRG concept, with upgrades to its command and control facilities and the installation of a permanent hangar. This was to have been a stopgap solution until the entry into service of the new Multi-Role Support Ships (MRSS) in the 2030s. In July 2022, it was reported that the future Littoral Strike role would be assumed by RFA Argus after a refit to convert her. Escort will be provided by at least one frigate or destroyer. However, this approach was effectively abandoned as of 2025 when Argus was laid up due to her poor condition and later confirmed for scrapping.

Fixed and rotary-wing remotely-piloted air systems (RPAS) are an integral part of the LRG concept. These systems provide commandos with increased strike, surveillance and logistical options, increasing their lethality, survivability and sustainability.

== Operational history ==
Up to 2025, the Royal Navy sought to maintain two operational LRGs: Littoral Response Group (North), which is based in Europe, and Littoral Response Group (South), which had been planned to be based in the Indo-Pacific region. However, given the retirement/unavailability of vessels, as of 2025 it is likely that, at best, only one Littoral Response Group can now be maintained.

=== Littoral Response Group (North) ===
Littoral Response Group (North)
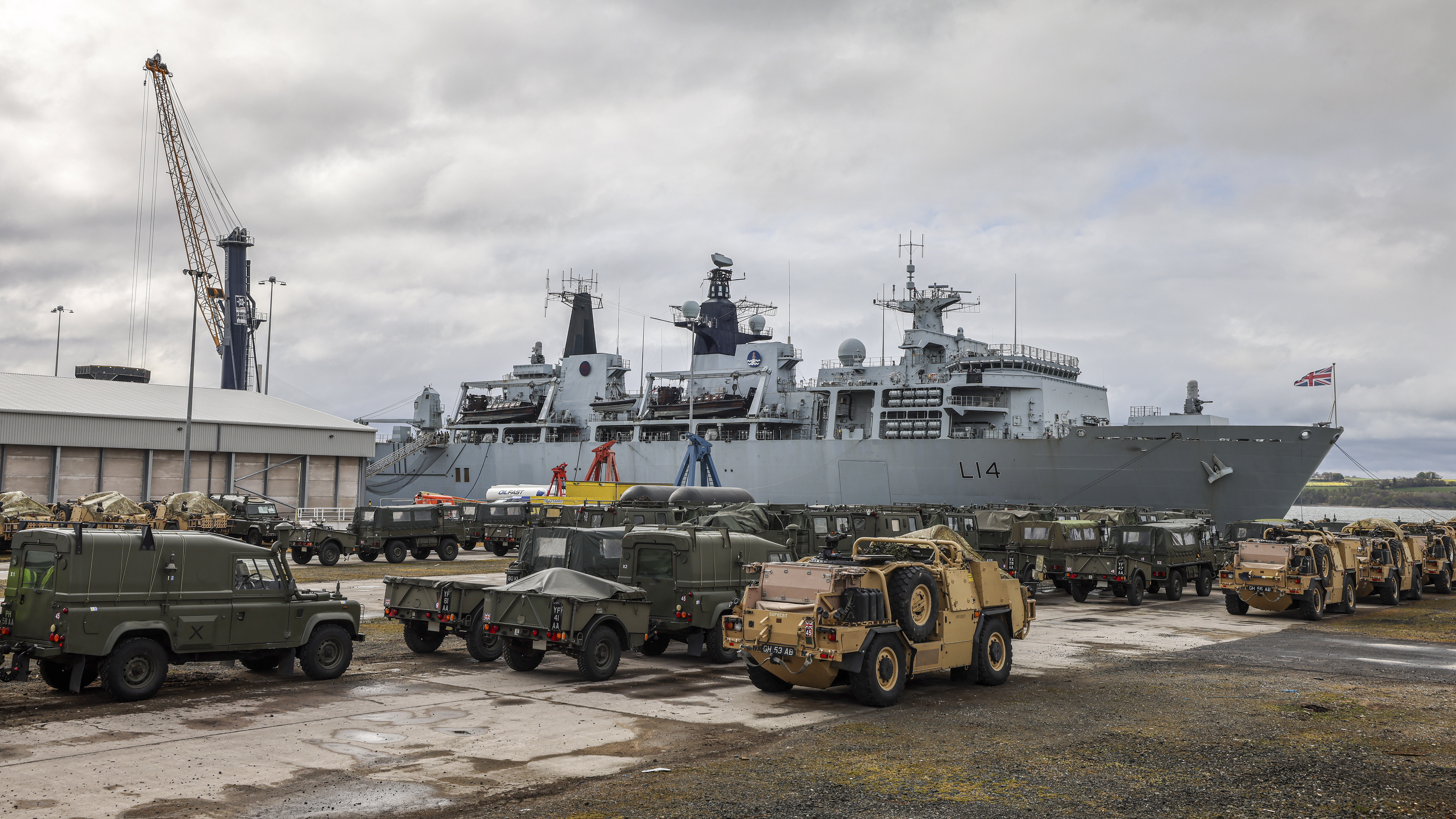
- HMS Albion preparing for deployment as part of LRG(N) (May 2021)
- Founded: 2021
- Country: United Kingdom
- Branch: Royal Navy
- Type: Littoral response group
- Size: Bay-class landing ships; other elements as required

Commanders
- Current commander: Captain Simon Kelly

Littoral Response Group (North) has been the lead formation, based in Europe, with an area of responsibility in the Atlantic, Baltic and Mediterranean. It has included an Albion-class landing platform dock, a Bay-class landing ship dock, a company of 45 Commando Royal Marines and supporting elements. As of 2024, an Albion-class ship would only be made available from reserve "if required", making the group effectively reliant on RFA Mounts Bay on a day-to-day basis. Later in the year, it was indicated that both Albion-class vessels would be retired.

LRG (N) was first deployed in March 2021 on a three-month mission to the North Atlantic and Baltic Sea and took part in NATO's BALTOPS large-scale military exercise. The task group consisted of amphibious warfare ships HMS Albion and RFA Mounts Bay, Type 23 frigate HMS Lancaster, AgustaWestland AW159 Wildcat helicopters from 847 Naval Air Squadron and Royal Marines from 45 and 30 Commando. In May, the same task group then participated in Exercise Ragnar Viking alongside the US Navy's USS Iwo Jima amphibious ready group in Norway. Prior to this, both groups carried out joint amphibious drills in Scotland as part of Exercise Wader. 29 Commando Regiment Royal Artillery, 24 Commando Royal Engineers and the Commando Logistics Regiment supported this deployment. Both task groups also joined the UK Carrier Strike Group led by the aircraft carrier HMS Queen Elizabeth for Exercise Strike Warrior. The exercise involved 20 ships, three submarines and 84 aircraft and validated NATO's ability to coordinate a carrier strike group with an amphibious task group.

In September 2022, RFA Argus joined the task group for the first time, joining HMS Albion, RFA Mounts Bay, RFA Tidesurge and HMS Defender in the Mediterranean. Argus provided the task group enhanced medical facilities and a flight deck with Merlin and Wildcat helicopters.

In March 2023, the Royal Navy established a base in Norway for LRG(N) personnel, named Camp Viking. It will be used to respond to emerging crises in Europe.

In March 2024, the task group participated in Nordic Response in Norway. During the exercise, commandos from RFA Mounts Bay located and "destroyed" anti-access/area denial systems which granted NATO forces access to northern Norway.

=== Littoral Response Group (South) ===
Littoral Response Group (South)
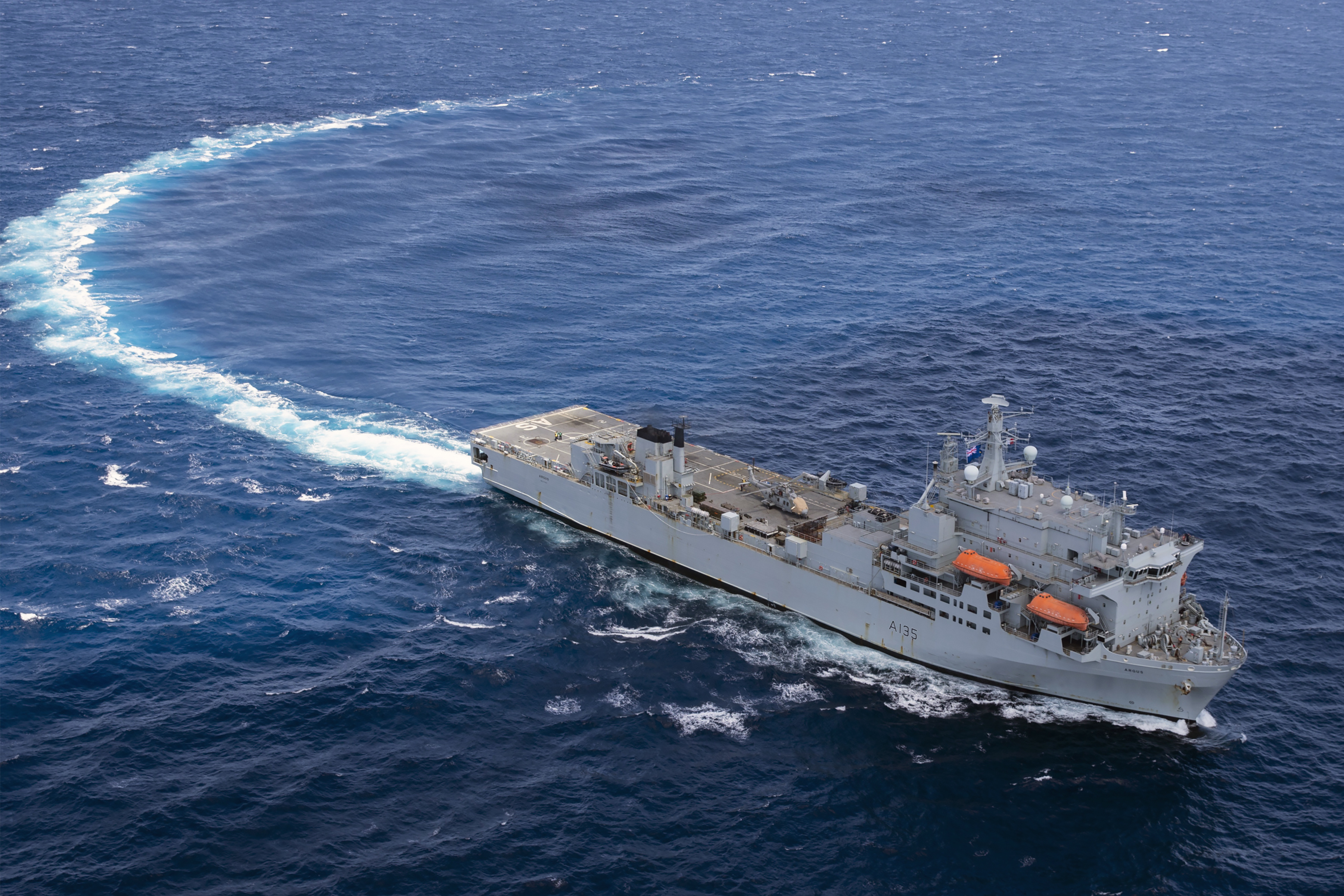
- RFA Argus, Littoral Strike Ship for LRG (South)
- Active: 2023–2025 (de facto termination of role due to lack of ship availability)
- Country: United Kingdom
- Branch: Royal Navy
- Type: Littoral response group
- Size: Prior to 2025: RFA Argus & one Bay-class landing ship (when available); other elements as required

Littoral Response Group (South) had been assigned responsibility for operations in the Indo-Pacific, though both ships normally assigned to LRG (S) were usually not available in the region.

LRG (S) formed in September 2023 with RFAs Argus and Lyme Bay assigned as its principal vessels. The commando element is provided by 40 Commando Royal Marines who carried out pre-deployment training in the Mojave Desert in October 2021 in order to prepare them for their role. They trained alongside Dutch Marines who will also be providing part of the LRG. The Commando Logistic Regiment, 30 Commando Information Exploitation Group, 24 Commando Royal Engineers and 29 Commando Royal Artillery also provide components as required. In total, the task group will comprise up to 500 British troops and 120 Dutch troops.

On 12 October 2023, the UK deployed LRG(S), consisting of RFAs Argus and Lyme Bay and supported by RAF P-8 Poseidon aircraft operating from RAF Akrotiri, to the Eastern Mediterranean during the Gaza war.

In January 2024, Lyme Bay stopped at Port Said, Egypt to deliver 70 tonnes of humanitarian aid for Gaza. In March, Argus and Lyme Bay transited the Red Sea amid the Red Sea crisis, escorted by HMS Diamond, and stopped at Kattupalli Shipyard in India for maintenance. In April, the ships participated in a Maritime Partnership Exercise with the Indian Navy's Eastern Fleet in the Indian Ocean. The tasks conducted in the exercise included "tactical manoeuvres, boarding ops, surface engagement against simulated asymmetric threats, cross deck visits & cross deck helo ops."

In July 2024, Lyme Bay, Argus and troops from 40 Commando deployed to Australia for exercise "Predators Run" involving US and Australian forces. In September 2024, Argus returned to the U.K. via Cape Town. As of 2025, Argus had been laid up and seemed unlikely to return to sea. She was later confirmed for scrapping.
