= Multi-role strike ship =

Planned Royal Navy amphibious warfare ship

Class overview
- Operators: Royal Navy
- Preceded by: Albion class, Bay class, RFA Argus
- Built: Envisaged in the 2030s Canceled
- Planned: 3 to 6
- Canceled: All

General characteristics
- Type: Multi-role strike ship
- Boats & landing craft carried: Future Commando Insertion Craft (CIC); future Commando Utility Craft (CUC)
- Armament: Option for DragonFire laser directed energy weapon; option for VLS system
- Aviation facilities: Landing spot(s) for helicopter(s) and a hangar capable of stowing a Chinook helicopter

The Multi-Role Strike Ship (MRSS) was a planned class of up to six multi-mission amphibious warfare ships in development for the United Kingdom's Royal Navy. The ships were first officially mentioned in the British government's 2021 defence white paper, titled Defence in a Competitive Age. In May 2024, funding for the ships was announced at the Sea Power Conference in London. They were to replace the service's two Albion-class landing platform docks (which were retired early in March 2025), three Bay-class landing ship docks and the multi-purpose support ship RFA Argus (which also retired in 2025). Until March 2025, the ships were known as Multi-Role Support Ships.

The project was cancelled in the 2026 Defence Investment Plan in favour of future UK participation in the Netherlands led Amphibious Transport Ship Programme.

== Development ==
=== Background ===
Up until 2024, the Royal Navy operated two Albion-class landing platform docks for amphibious warfare which were augmented by three Bay-class landing ship docks and one support ship (RFA Argus) from the Royal Fleet Auxiliary. With the exception of Argus, these ships were originally commissioned in the 2000s and designed to deliver a brigade-level amphibious landing force. All six ships were due to retire from service in the 2030s, though, in November 2024, it was decided to retire the Albion-class vessels early by March 2025. It was subsequently indicated that Argus too would be taken out of service.

In the 2020s, the Royal Navy began a modernisation of its amphibious forces in accordance with its new Future Commando Force doctrine which emphasized lighter, more agile raiding operations for the Royal Marines. The navy's amphibious shipping was subsequently reorganized into two formations, known as Littoral Response Groups. In 2022, it was announced that Argus would undergo modifications to allow her to fulfil a new role as a littoral strike ship. However, this role only lasted a short time as she was subsequently deemed "unsafe to sail" and taken out of service.

In 2021, the UK government made its first official mention of the MRSS as part of its 2030 shipbuilding pipeline. In 2022, the ships were removed from the Royal Navy's future equipment plan due to issues of affordability. However, the navy insisted the ships remained part of its future plans.

In March 2025, Defence Minister Maria Eagle stated that the ships had been renamed Multi-Role Strike Ships to better reflect their functionalities as combat ships with offensive and defensive weaponry.

=== Concept phase ===
The MRSS officially entered its concept phase in 2021.

==== UK-Dutch cooperation ====
In September 2023, the UK and the Netherlands signed a memorandum of understanding announced to explore the joint procurement of amphibious warfare ships under Project CATHERINA. This could have seen the six Royal Navy's amphibious vessels and the Royal Netherlands Navy's two Rotterdam-class landing platform docks and four Holland-class offshore patrol vessels replaced with a single shared design. Such a venture would not only bring greater economy of scale but would also better solidify the programme politically by helping to protect from possible budget cuts. However, in March 2024, this main effort was reportedly abandoned as the two parties identified that their requirements and budgets were too divergent for a single design to successfully meet. CATHERINA would instead re-focus on Anglo-Dutch coordination on subsystems, landing craft, and aviation. One key difference was the ships' ability to operate independently without an escort — a British preference which would require more substantial self-defence capability.

==== MRSS commencement ====
Following an announcement by Defence Secretary Grant Shapps at the Sea Power Conference in London, the programme officially received approval to commence with its first phase on 14 May 2024. Currently, the MRSS's are planned to enter service in the 2033/34 period, with three ships to be built initially and a plan for up to three additional vessels. The ships are envisaged as flexible, multi-purpose amphibious warfare platforms, capable of landing marines ashore via sea and air. The ships will feature well docks for landing craft, hangars capable of accommodating Chinook helicopters and a flight deck for helicopters and uncrewed systems. The ships will be highly adaptable and interchangeable by design, as well as interoperable with NATO allies. Lessons learned from the Russo-Ukrainian War and the Red Sea crisis will also factor in the design. The ships may also require fewer crew members than their predecessors.

==== Design contenders ====
Prior to the initiation of a formal competition, a number of designs have been raised as contenders for the MRSS programme. Following the commencement announcement in May, Shepard News reported that BMT could offer their 'ELLIDA' product line whilst Prevail Partners may put forward with their 'Multi-Role Vessel' design.

===== ELLIDA =====
Unveiled in 2019, the original concept design for ELLIDA was a multi-role auxiliary vessel designed to perform as both a solid stores ship for fleet replenishment-at-sea (RAS) and as an auxiliary landing vessel similar in capability to the Bay class. At DSEI 2023, BMT unveiled a revised ELLIDA design. This second generation design consist of vessels 130 metres (426 ft 6 in), 150 m (492 ft 2 in), 180 m (590 ft 7 in), or 200 m (656 ft 2 in) in length. The revision saw the removal of the RAS rigs from the design and brought the superstructure more forward and reduced the size of the forward working deck.

ELLIDA features two internal open deck areas for stores and other equipment as well as a forward external deck area for twenty-foot equivalent unit (TEU) containers which is serviced by two deck cranes. BMT have not publicly stated if ELLIDA's general characteristics have changed from those of the first generation design which had (in reference to the 200 m variant) a range of 8,500 nautical miles (15,700 km; 9,800 mi), a service speed of 18 knots (33 km/h; 21 mph) and a crew of 68. In the amphibious role ELLIDA could embark a military force of 350 personnel with an internal 700 lane metres for vehicle stowage, a well deck for two Landing Craft Utility, and a hangar for one AW101 Merlin with temporary storage for an additional three.

===== Fearless =====
During the Combined Naval Event in late May, Stellar Systems unveiled its 'Fearless' design for consideration for the MRSS programme. The design represented a more radical approach to traditional amphibious vessel design by effectively creating a hybrid surface-combatant, mothership, and amphibious vessel.

The Fearless concept is 170 m (557 ft 9 in) in length, displaces 15,500 tonnes (15,300 long tons) at full load, and has a range of 7,000 nmi (13,000 km; 8,100 mi) at 18 knots (33 km/h; 21 mph). It would be propelled by podded propellers with contra-rotating electrically driven shafts which, combined with an optimised hull, which would enable the ship to achieve 30 knots (56 km/h; 35 mph) whilst reportedly using less power than a Type 23 frigate. Fearless features a significant armament, with the model displaying 40 strike/tactical length vertical launch system (VLS) cells, 127-millimetre (5 in) and 76 mm (3 in) guns, two Phalanx close-in weapon systems (CIWS), three 30 mm (1.2 in) guns, two DragonFire laser directed-energy weapons (L-DEWs) and three trainable decoy launchers. The featured armament is said to allow a Fearless vessel to operate in heavily contested littoral areas.

There is a working deck amidship capable of holding five containers or mission modules, docking stations for uncrewed surface vessels, two boat bays, and has hangar space for two AW101 Merlins. The hangar has access to the vehicle deck with 800 lane metres of space. Notably, Fearless lacks a well deck, instead featuring a stern ramp capable of handling 30-tonne (30-long-ton) craft up to 20 m (65 ft 7 in) in length, with a vehicle ramp that can deployed to support ground vehicles up to 60 t (59 long tons; 66 short tons). Unlike a well deck, the ramp allows for drones, landing craft and other vessels to be embarked/disembarked in higher sea states but would remove the ability to utilise the larger LSU, limiting shore landings to the Mexeflote or Commando Insertion Craft (forthcoming LCVP replacement).

== Assessment phase: core designs and capabilities ==
The assessment phase for the project had been projected to begin in 2026. In May 2025, at the Combined Naval Event 2025 in Farnborough, officials revealed the core designs and capabilities planned for the ships. These are to include:

- a well dock;
- longer-range insertion craft;
- a flight deck supported by a hangar;
- capacity (including via a mission bay) to operate as ‘drone carriers’ for maritime uncrewed systems (MUS); and,
- fitted 'for but not with’ emerging capabilities such as directed energy weapons (DEW). Options for installing a vertical launching system (VLS) were also to be considered.

The well dock was to be capable of supporting two types of future landing craft: the envisaged Commando Insertion Craft (CIC) to deliver vehicles, troops and specialist equipment (while also carrying ISR capabilities); and, a Commando Utility Craft (CUC), which may incorporate uncrewed systems or containerised strike capabilities. However, the entire program was cancelled in the 2026 DIP in favour of UK participation in the Netherlands led Amphibious Transport Ship Programme.
