= Albion-class landing platform dock =

Type of amphibious warfare ship in service with the Royal Navy

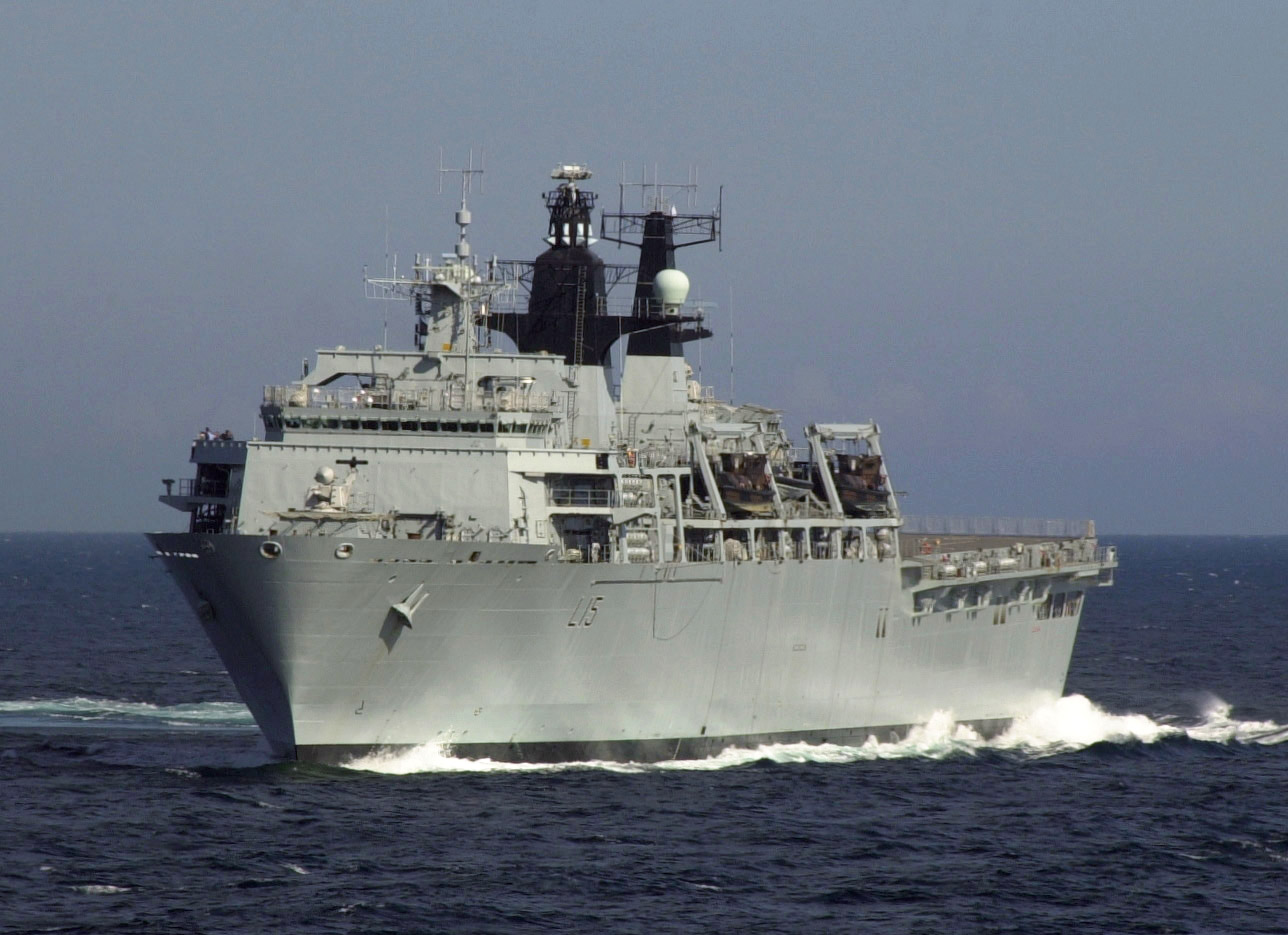
- HMS Bulwark, an Albion-class landing platform dock

Class overview
- Name: Albion class
- Builders: BAE Systems Marine
- Operators: Royal Navy; Brazilian Navy
- Preceded by: Fearless class
- Succeeded by: ATS-class amphibious warfare ship (planned)
- Cost: £225 million per unit
- Built: 2
- In commission: 2003–2025 (Royal Navy); 2026 (Brazilian Navy)
- Active: 1

General characteristics
- Type: Landing platform dock
- Displacement: 19,560 t (19,250 long tons; 21,560 short tons)
- Length: 176 m (577 ft)
- Beam: 28.9 m (95 ft)
- Draught: 7.1 m (23 ft)
- Installed power: 2 × Wärtsilä Vasa 16V 32E diesel generators; 2 × Wärtsilä Vasa 4R 32E diesel generators
- Propulsion: GE power conversion full electric propulsion system, 2 × motors and drives; Bow thruster
- Speed: 18 knots (21 mph; 33 km/h)
- Range: 8,000 miles (7,000 nmi; 13,000 km)
- Boats & landing craft carried: 4 × LCU MK10; 4 × LCVP MK5
- Capacity: 67 vehicles
- Troops: 405 Royal Marines (710 overload)
- Complement: 325
- Sensors & processing systems: 2 × Type 1007/8 I-band radars; 1 × Type 996 E/F band radar; 1 × Type 997 E/F-band radar (from 2011)
- Armament: 2 × 20mm Phalanx CIWS; 2 × 20mm GAM-BO1 cannon; 4 × General purpose machine guns
- Aviation facilities: Two landing spots for helicopters up-to the size of a Chinook.

The Albion-class landing platform dock is a class of amphibious warfare ship originally built for the Royal Navy. The class consists of two vessels, HMS Albion and HMS Bulwark, ordered in 1996 to replace the ageing Fearless class. Both ships were built by BAE Systems Marine at the former Vickers Shipbuilding and Engineering yard in Barrow-in-Furness. Albion was commissioned in 2003 and Bulwark in 2005. Each of the ships has a crew of 325 and can accommodate up to 405 troops. Thirty-one large trucks and thirty-six smaller vehicles and main battle tanks can be carried inside the vehicle deck. To disembark troops and vehicles, the vessels are equipped with eight landing craft.

In November 2024, the newly elected Labour government stated that the ships would be removed from service by March 2025. In April 2025 it was announced that both ships would be sold to the Brazilian Navy. On 10 September 2025, the Brazilian Navy signed the contract to buy former HMS Bulwark.

== Development ==
The value of the two Fearless-class landing platform docks was highlighted during the Falklands War. Not only did the ships transport troops and vehicles to the South Atlantic, the commanders of the landing operations at San Carlos were aboard HMS Fearless, and once they arrived their flight decks were used to support airborne operations by helicopters and Sea Harrier jets.

As these ships were built in the 1960s, on 18 July 1996 the British Ministry of Defence awarded a £450 million contract for their replacements to Vickers Shipbuilding and Engineering Ltd (VSEL) in Barrow-in-Furness.

The ships' roles are "to act as the afloat command platform for the Royal Navy's Amphibious Task Force and Landing Force Commanders when embarked" and "to embark, transport, deploy and recover troops with their equipment and vehicles which form part of an amphibious assault force". They are larger and more capable than the Fearless class, and formed part of a modernization programme of the British amphibious fleet, which included the helicopter carrier HMS Ocean (until 2018), the Bay-class landing ships of the Royal Fleet Auxiliary and the Point-class sealift ships.

=== Extended readiness ===
To cut the running costs of the Royal Navy, the 2010 Strategic Defence and Security Review concluded that one of its two Albion-class LPDs should be placed into extended readiness, or uncrewed reserve, while the other is held at high readiness for operations. The vessels were to alternate between extended readiness and high readiness throughout their service lives.

It was confirmed that Albion would be the first of the two vessels to be placed at extended readiness, for a cost of £2.5 million, as Bulwark had recently finished a major refit. Running costs while in extended readiness are estimated to be £300,000 per annum to keep the vessel available for reactivation at short notice. HMS Albion re-entered high readiness when HMS Bulwark was put into extended readiness. In 2014 Albion entered a regeneration refit and rejoined the active fleet in 2016. The running costs of one of the Albion-class vessels at high readiness ranged from £17.7 million to £38.6 million per annum from 2007 to 2011. As of late 2018 Albion was in active service while Bulwark was held at extended readiness.

In 2024, it was reported that, due to manning problems in the Royal Navy and despite the pending completion of a major refit of HMS Bulwark, both vessels were now expected to remain in reserve. In May 2024, the Navy indicated that it intended to retain both ships until 2033/34 when they would be replaced by the future Multi Role Support Ships (MRSS) (later "Multi Role Strike Ships"). However, in November 2024, the recently elected Labour government indicated that they would in fact be retired early in order to save money. Subsequently, in the British Government's 2026 Defence Investment Plan, the Multi Role Strike Ships were cancelled in favour of the less expensive ATS-class amphibious warfare ship still envisaged for service entry in the 2030s.

== Characteristics ==
The Albion-class LPDs have a length of 176 metres (577 ft), a breadth of 28.9 metres (94 ft 10 in), and a draught of 7.1 metres (23 ft 4 in). They have a normal displacement of 14,000 tonnes (14,000 long tons; 15,000 short tons), 19,560 tonnes (19,250 long tons; 21,560 short tons) at full load and 21,000 tonnes (21,000 long tons; 23,000 short tons) when the dock is flooded. The ships have a crew of 325 and can accommodate up to 405 troops, including their vehicles and combat supplies, in overload conditions. The GE Electric Propulsion System is powered by two Wärtsilä Vasa 16V 32E diesel generators generating at 6.6kV which drive two electric motors, two shafts, and a bow thruster as well as providing all the services power on the vessel. The first diesel electric propulsion system to be used in a Royal Navy surface ship was in the 1960s built Hecla-class ocean survey ships. This is the first in a major surface combatant vessel. It reduces the engine room crew by about 66 per cent compared with the preceding Fearless class of ships. The diesel electric system can propel the ships to a maximum speed of 18 knots and have a range of 8,000 miles (13,000 km).

The aft flight deck has two landing spots for aircraft the size of a Chinook, although it has no hangar or aircraft storage facility. Below the flight deck are the dock and vehicle deck. The latter has the capacity to hold thirty-one large trucks and thirty-six smaller vehicles or six Challenger 2 tanks and thirty armoured personnel carriers. The dock can hold four Landing Craft Utility MK10, each large enough to carry vehicles up to main battle tank size, which are then launched by flooding of the dock area. Four smaller LCVP MK5 that can carry thirty-five men or two light trucks are carried on davits, two each side of the ship's superstructure. Each ship also carries a fifty-two ton tracked beach recovery vehicle for assisting with landing craft recovery, as well as two tractors: one that can lay a track-way across a landing beach, and the second fitted with an excavating bucket and forks.

=== Weapons and sensors ===
For defence against missile attack, the Albion-class LPDs were fitted with two 30 mm Goalkeeper CIWSs mounted fore and aft on the superstructure and two 20 mm cannon located on the forward superstructure. Defensive countermeasures include the Outfit DLJ decoys, eight Seagnat radar reflection / infra-red emitting decoy launchers and a BAE Systems DLH off-board decoy. In 2017, Albion had her Goalkeeper mounts removed and replaced by a pair of 20mm Phalanx mounts as part of her refit prior to returning to active service; Bulwark will have her Goalkeeper mounts removed upon her entry into Extended Readiness.

When commissioned, the ships were fitted with two Kelvin Hughes Type 1007/8 I-band radars, for navigation and aircraft control. For air and surface search, a Selex Sensors and Airborne Systems Radar Type 996 E/F band radar was fitted. From 2013 on, RT996 will be gradually replaced by the BAE Systems Maritime Services Artisan 3D E/F-band (designated RT997). HMS Iron Duke was the first Royal Navy ship so fitted; RT997 will be fitted to Albion and Bulwark by 2015. There is also an ADAWS 2000 combat data system and a UAT/1-4 Electronic support measures (ESM) system.

== Decommission and sale to Brazil ==
The decommission of the ships by the RN was planned for March 2025. On 20 December 2024, was reported that the Brazilian Navy is in negotiation with RN to buy HMS Bulwark. On 26 January 2025, the Daily Mail reported the sale for Brazil of the two boats of the class, Albion and Bulwark, in a negotiation of £20 million (R$145 million). On 4 February 2025, the Brazilian Navy confirmed the negotiations to the newspaper O Globo.

On 2 April 2025, the Brazilian and British MoDs signed a letter of intent to launch the basis of formal negotiations, including detailed technical assessments and discussions on the financial and logistical terms, aiming at the incorporation of the units into the Brazilian Navy's fleet. On 4 April, the UK MoD confirmed the negotiations for the transfer. On 30 April, the UK's Minister of State for Defence Procurement and Industry and House of Commons MP Maria Eagle, confirmed the intention to sell the two ships to Brazil, in an answer to MP Ben Obese-Jecty.

=== Brazilian service ===
On 10 September 2025, during the Defence and Security Equipment International in London, the former HMS Bulwark was officially sold to Brazil with the contract signed aboard HMS Mersey. She will be re-commissioned in 2026. The transfer of the ship to Brazil took place in September 2025 with an handover ceremony at HMNB Devonport in Plymouth.

== Ships – disposal and current state ==
Pennant	Name	Commissioned by RN	Decommissioned by RN	Sale contract signed	Re-commissioned new owner	Status
L14	Albion	19 June 2003	March 2025			Decommissioned, awaiting disposal.
L15	Bulwark	10 December 2004	March 2025	10 September 2025	2026	Sold to Brazil; Renamed as NDM Oiapoque.

=== HMS Albion ===
HMS Albion was launched at Barrow-in-Furness on 9 March 2001. After completing sea trials, Albion was commissioned in June 2003 and became fully operational in April 2004. Her home port is HMNB Devonport on the south coast of England.

In December 2010, it was announced that Albion would be the next Royal Navy flagship after HMS Ark Royal. She was deployed with the Response Force Task Group to the Gulf of Sidra off Libya to assist the ongoing NATO-led operation, and then moved into the Indian Ocean in June 2011 to assist with anti-piracy operations off the Horn of Africa. In 2011 she entered a state of "extended readiness". In July 2017, she re-entered active service after a long re-fit. While remaining temporarily deployable if required, in July 2023 she entered reduced readiness (skeleton crew aboard for ship maintenance). By early 2024, she was reported to have transitioned to "extended readiness" (uncrewed reserve).

=== HMS Bulwark ===
HMS Bulwark, the second in the class, was launched at Barrow-in-Furness in November 2001, and was commissioned in December 2004.

One of Bulwark's first missions was Operation Highbrow in the Mediterranean in July 2006. Docking in Beirut, the ship evacuated around 1,300 United Kingdom nationals. In May 2010, she entered dry-dock at HMNB Devonport for a £30 million refit. In October 2011, Bulwark, having just completed an eight-month refit, became the flagship of the fleet. The refit improved her machinery and magazines, converted her to full night-vision tactical ability for landing craft and aircraft, and gave her the ability to operate two Chinook helicopters from the flight deck at the same time. She returned to reserve in 2016 and was expected to complete a lengthy refit in 2024 but nevertheless remain in uncrewed reserve, though with an ability to deploy "if required". Despite this recent refit (which had already cost £72.1 million), in November 2024 it was indicated that HMS Bulwark, along with her sister ship, would in fact be taken out of service completely. In 2025, she was sold to Brazil.

== See also ==
- List of active Royal Marines military watercraft

Equivalent amphibious warfare ships of the same era

- Harpers Ferry class
- Foudre class
- Rotterdam class
- Galicia class
- Ōsumi class
