= ATS-class amphibious warfare ship =

Ship design project of the Royal Netherlands Navy

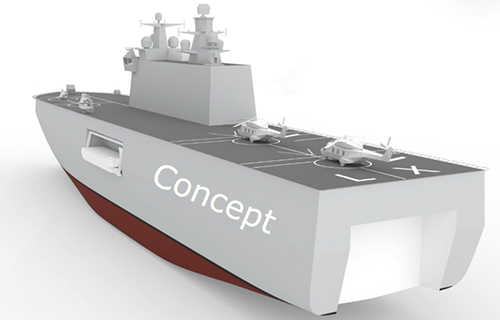
- Early artist impression

Class overview
- Name: Amphibious Transport Ship (ATS)
- Builders: Damen Group
- Operators: Royal Netherlands Navy; Royal Navy
- Preceded by: Netherlands: Rotterdam-class landing platform dock; Holland-class offshore patrol vessel; United Kingdom: Albion-class landing platform dock; Bay-class landing ship; RFA Argus PCRS
- In commission: 2032 onwards
- Planned: 8

General characteristics
- Type: Amphibious transport dock
- Displacement: 15,000 tonnes
- Length: 160 m (524 ft 11 in)
- Complement: ~ 60 crew
- Aviation facilities: CH-47 capable flight deck and hangar
- Notes: Floodable dock at the stern to launch / recover landing craft

The Amphibious Transport Ship (ATS) was originally an initiative by the Dutch Navy to procure a series of six amphibious warfare ships as a replacement for the Rotterdam class and Holland class. In 2026, the program was revised to incorporate a joint approach with the United Kingdom envisaging the procurement of four ships for the Royal Netherlands Navy and four for the Royal Navy.

== History ==
In the 2022 Defence spending bill it was announced that at the end of their life cycle the two Rotterdam-class ships will be replaced together with the four ships of the Holland-class to form a new class of 'cross-over' ships with patrol-, amphibious- & emergency relief capabilities in mind.

As of March 2024, this program is still in early development. More details were to be released in the B-letter, which had been expected in 2025. With the D-letter following in 2027, after which contract signing will take place. The first ship had been planned to be in service by 2032, with the next five being commissioned with one year intervals. The intended builder was announced to be the Damen Group.

=== UK-Dutch cooperation ===
In June 2023, the Netherlands and British governments announced that the two countries would "explore opportunities" to jointly develop new specialist amphibious warships.

However, in March 2024, this effort was reportedly abandoned as the two countries identified that their requirements and budgets were too different for a single design. Instead they would focus on Anglo-Dutch coordination on subsystems, landing craft, and aviation, with the British continuing with their Multi Role Strike Ship programme. One key difference was the ships' ability to operate independently without an escort. This was a British preference which would require more substantial self-defence capability.

In June 2026 the British Government's defence investment plan announced the cancellation of the Multi-Role Strike Ships (considered too complicated and costly) and the acquisition of the amphibious transport ships (ATS), built and operated in cooperation with the Netherlands, instead. The following month, it was announced that the UK and the Netherlands signed a £2.4 billion agreement to jointly build a class of eight ATS, with each nation procuring four vessels. The ATS will have a length of 160 meters and a displacement of 15,000 tonnes.

== Ships ==
Name	No.	Builder	Contract	Status	Steel cutting	Laid down	Launched	Comm.	Notes
Royal Netherlands Navy - 4 planned
TBA	TBA	Damen Schelde (design and fitting out) / Damen Shipyards Galați (hull construction)	–	Planned	–	–	–	–	
TBA	TBA	Damen Schelde (design and fitting out) / Damen Shipyards Galați (hull construction)	–	Planned	–	–	–	–	
TBA	TBA	Damen Schelde (design and fitting out) / Damen Shipyards Galați (hull construction)	–	Planned	–	–	–	–	
TBA	TBA	Damen Schelde (design and fitting out) / Damen Shipyards Galați (hull construction)	–	Planned	–	–	–	–	
Royal Navy - 4 planned
TBA	TBA	British shipyard (TBA)	–	Planned	–	–	–	–	
TBA	TBA	British shipyard (TBA)	–	Planned	–	–	–	–	
TBA	TBA	British shipyard (TBA)	–	Planned	–	–	–	–	
TBA	TBA	British shipyard (TBA)	–	Planned	–	–	–	–	

Planned dates

== See also ==
- Future of the Royal Netherlands Navy
- Future of the Royal Navy
- NRP D. João II
- San Giorgio-class amphibious transport dock
- UXV Combatant
