= 2026 Defence Investment Plan =

UK defense spending plan

The 2026 Defence Investment Plan (DIP) is a strategic framework published by the Government of the United Kingdom on 30 June 2026, outlining the strategy of the Ministry of Defence in terms of spending priorities and investment for a four year period spanning from 2026/27 to 2029/30. The plan, which supersedes the previous Defence Equipment Plan, is intended to serve as the primary implementation mechanism of the 2025 Strategic Defence Review.

The plan is intended to address a "more dangerous and contested" geopolitical environment, in the context of the Russo-Ukrainian war and the Iran–Israel–United States war, with the DIP providing specific information on how the United Kingdom will shift its military posture. The DIP commits a total of 298 billion pounds over the course of four years, covering aspects of the countries defence, including autonomous systems, nuclear deterrent, force modernisation, infrastructure and procurement reform. The development of the DIP was marked by the 2026 Labour Party leadership crisis. In June 2026 the Starmer ministry faced a leadership crisis, which saw the resignation of Secretary of State for Defence John Healey, Parliamentary Under-Secretary of State for the Armed Forces Alistair Carns and Parliamentary Private Secretary and Pamela Nash, whom reportedly departed over disagreements in the DIP, stating that the settlement was insufficient and risked leaving the armed forces under-resourced amidst a volatile threat environment. Following these resignations, the plan was finalised by the newly appointed Secretary of State for Defence on 11 June 2026, Dan Jarvis.

The plan was unveiled by Prime Minister Keir Starmer on 30 June 2026. This was eight days after he announced his resignation as prime minister and Leader of the Labour Party. Starmer presented the DIP as a key pillar of his legacy, framing the plan as a "historic shift". Funding for all the additional spending was not initially allocated, with Starmer suggesting that his successor borrow further to finance the gap in funding. Funding for other projects such as road and energy infrastructure was also planned to be reduced to secure funding.

== Key decisions ==
=== British Army ===
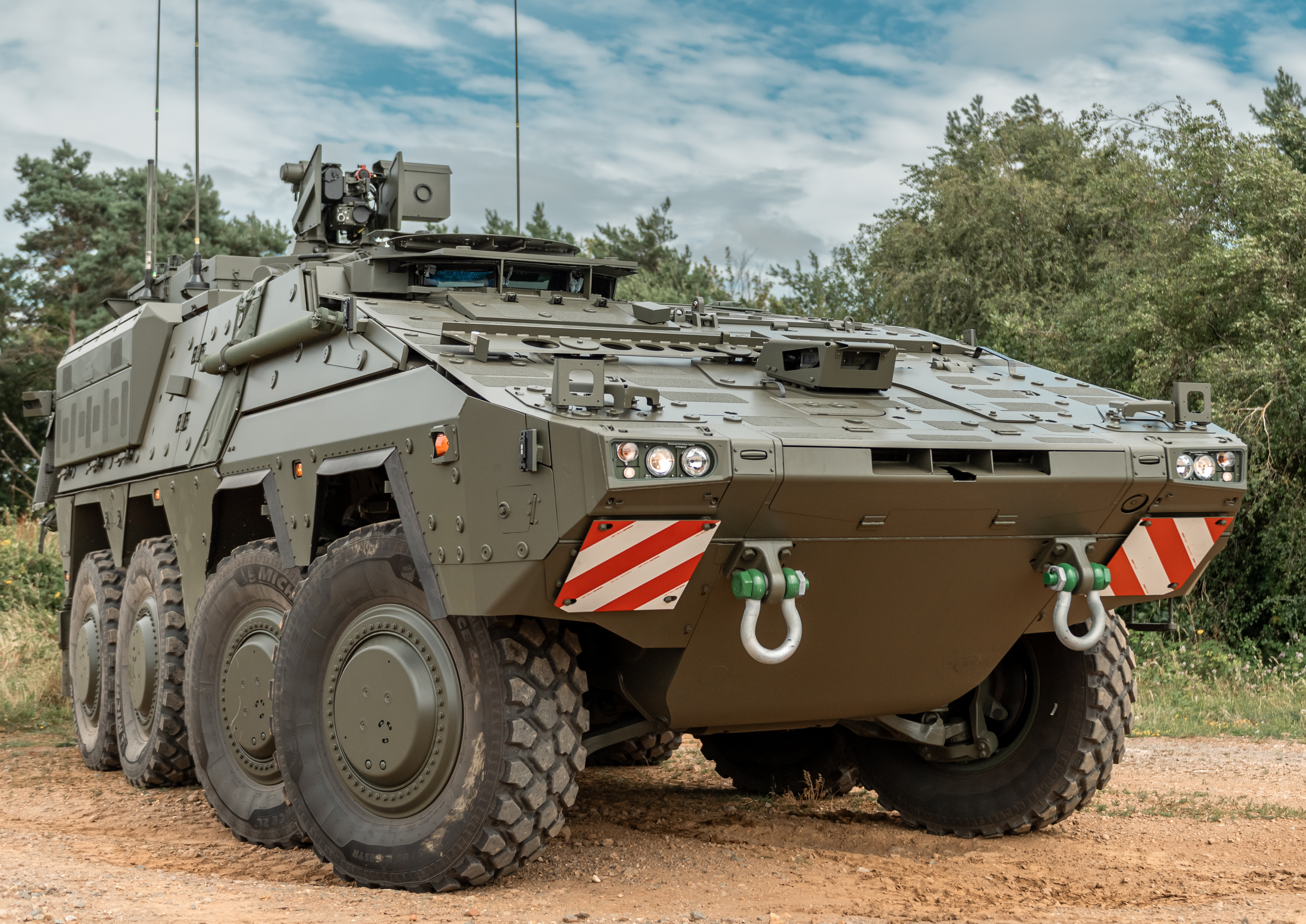
Boxer armoured fighting vehicle

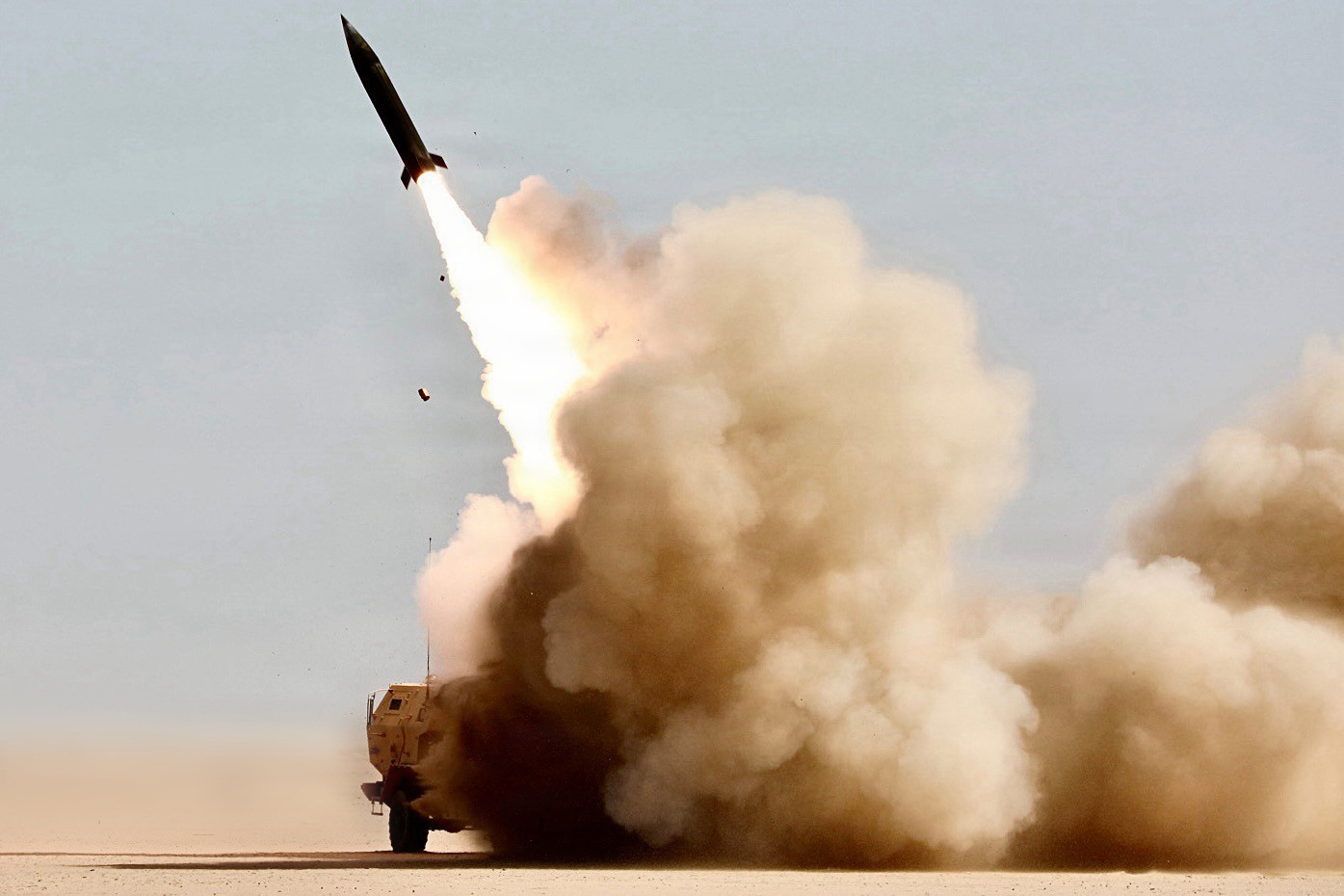
Precision Strike Missile (PrSM)

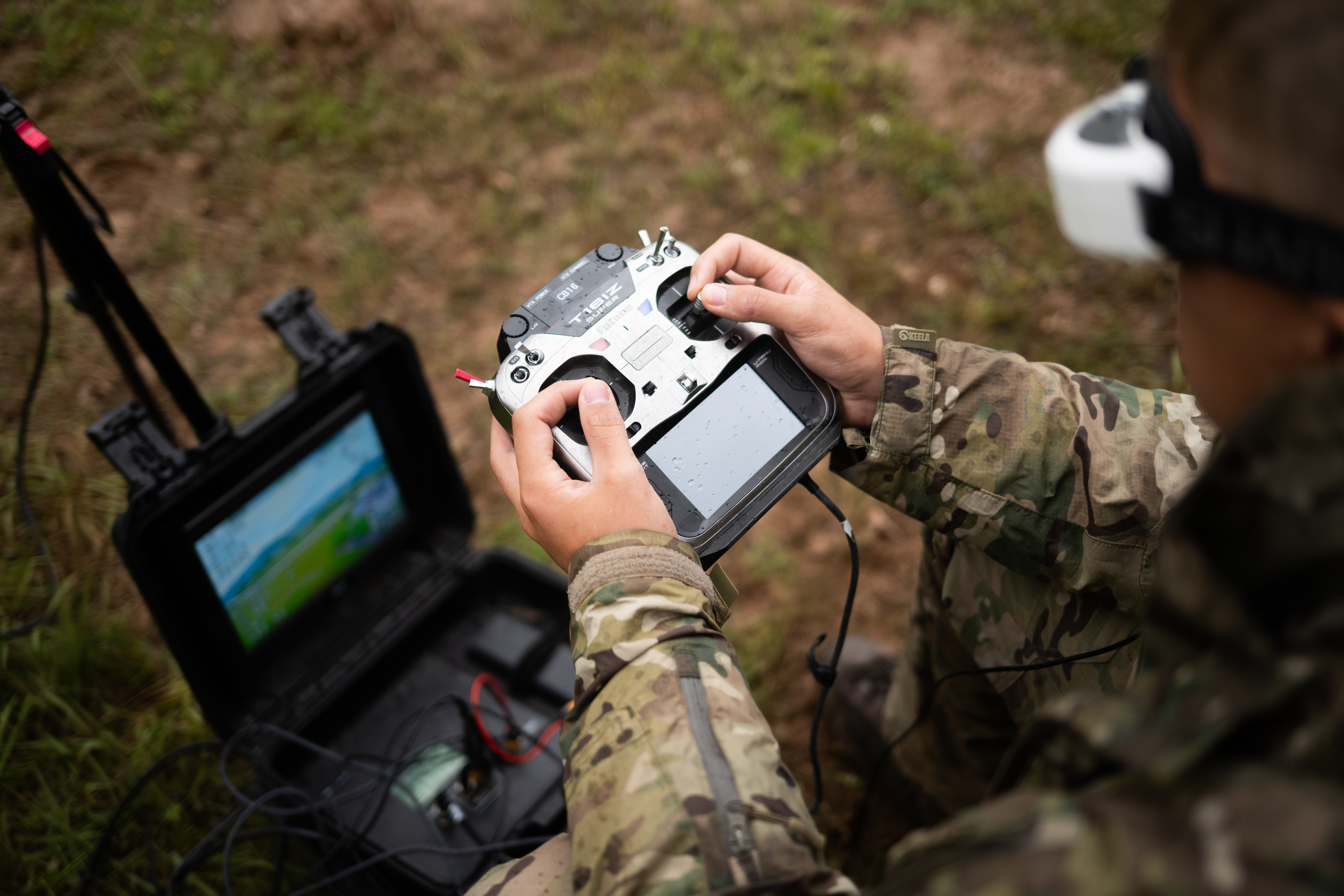
A British Army soldier piloting a Neros Archer FPV drone

- £1.1 billion for the Challenger 3 main battle tank, £2.2 billion for the Boxer wheeled armoured fighting vehicle and £1.1 billion for the Ajax armoured fighting vehicle.
- £500 million in funding for the Light Mobility Vehicle and Heavy Protected Mobility projects.
- Project Asgard - £370 million towards an AI assisted battlefield management system. Key system integrators include Palantir, Anduril and Helsing.
- Project NYX - £220 million to build autonomous armed aircraft for army aviation, which would operate alongside Apache attack helicopters. Selected industry partners are Anduril, BAE Systems, Leonardo, Lockheed Martin, SYOS Aerospace, Tekever and Thales.
- Project Corvus - £310 million additional investment in long range surveillance and reconnaissance capabilities, replacing the problematic Elbit Thales Watchkeeper WK450 with 24 new unmanned aerial vehicles for intelligence, surveillance, target acquisition, and reconnaissance.
- Short Range Ballistic Missiles - £190 million towards procurement and deployment of the Lockheed Martin Precision Strike Missile.
- Unmanned Systems - £200 million of further investments in counter drone technology, £150 million to commence the development and production of uncrewed ground vehicles, and £400 million for the Land Lethality Pipeline - set to develop a set of inexpensive expendable unmanned/autonomous systems. This includes funding for Task Force Rapstone, focused on drones and loitering munitions.
- £680 million to advance the New Medium Helicopter (NMH) program.
- Early retirement of Army Air Corps AW159 Wildcat helicopters, with a claim that manned reconnaissance-in-force aircraft are obsolete on a modern battlefield.
- Early retirement of older Chinook variants.

=== Royal Navy ===
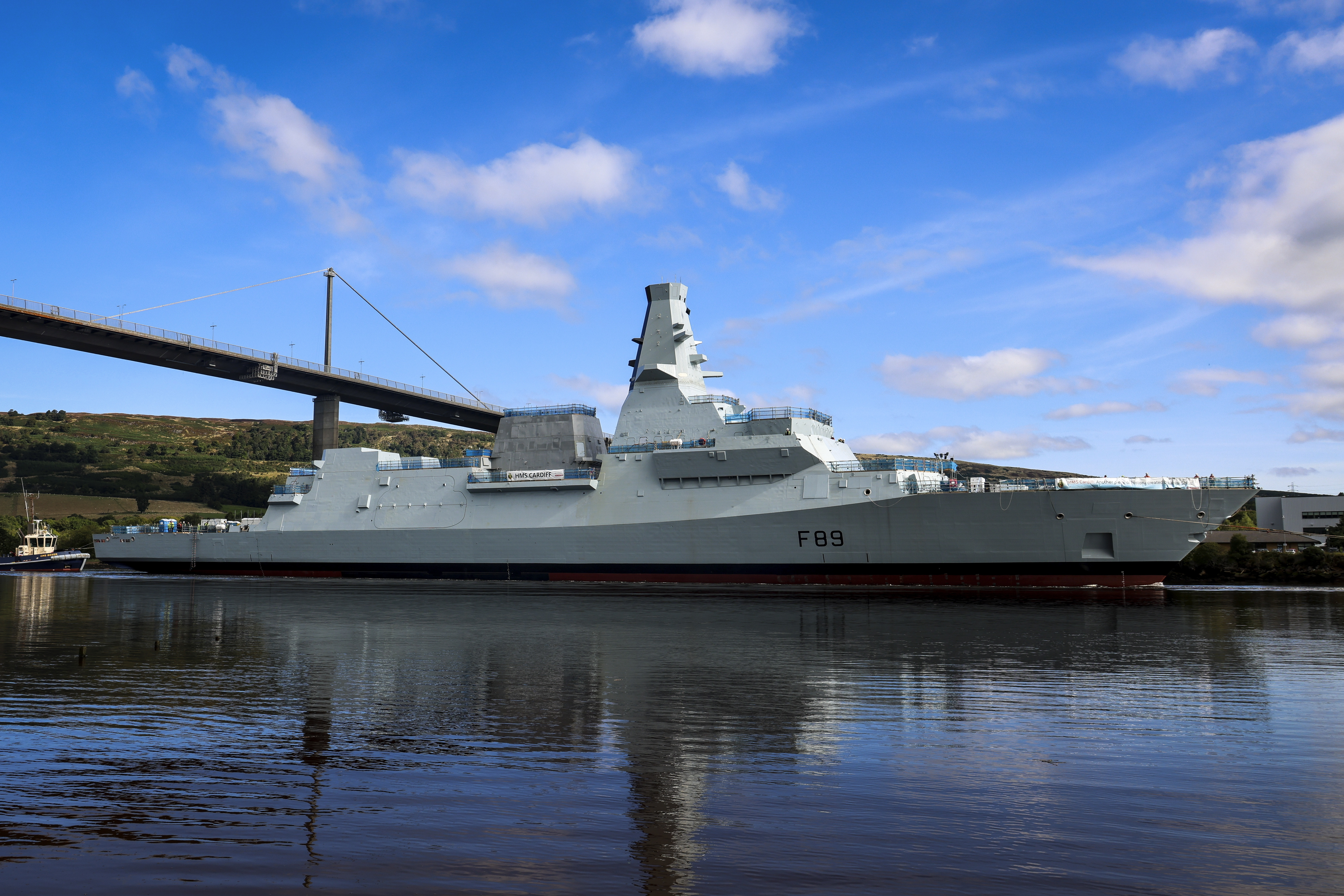
The Type 26 frigate HMS Cardiff prior to fitting out, 2024

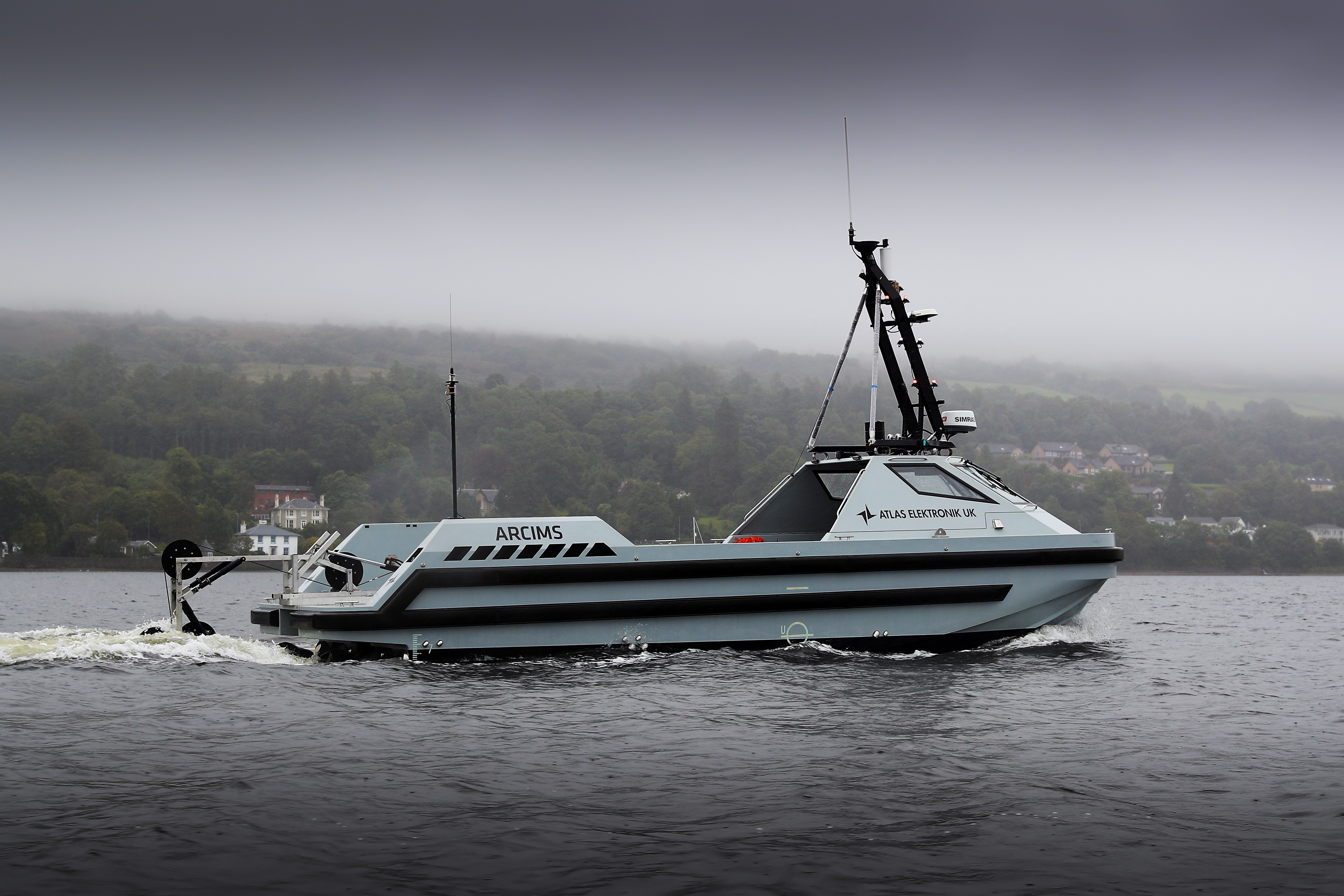
ATLAS Remote Combined Influence Minesweeping System

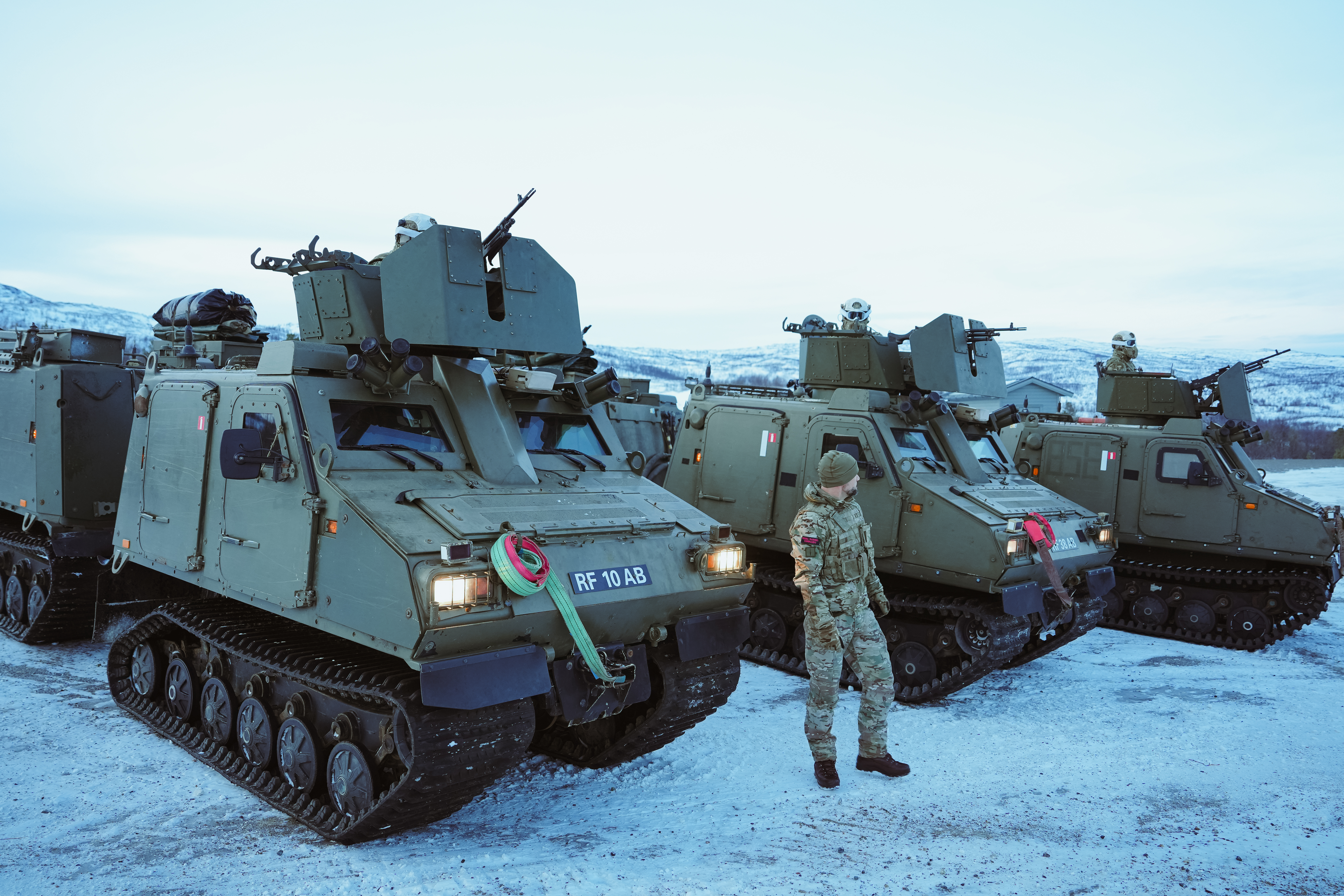
BvS10 Viking

- Cancellation of proposed Type 83 destroyers and Type 32 frigates. The existing six Type 45 destroyers will eventually be replaced by the following vessels, with £1.3 billion allocated for the development of a hybrid fleet primarily consisting of unmanned vehicles: the Type 91 uncrewed missile platform, Type 92 underwater sensor platform, Type 93 extra-large uncrewed underwater vessel (XLUUV), Type 94 uncrewed radar platform and a future class of manned warships described as a Common Combat Vessel (CCV). The DIP indicated that the first large autonomous vessels will be brought into service by 2030, including a prototype uncrewed missile platform and prototype XLUUVs with payloads developed through AUKUS.
- Continued procurement of the Type 26 frigate and Type 31 frigate. A combined fleet of 13 Type 26 frigates are planned to be operated with the Royal Norwegian Navy (Note: Eight ships to be operated by the Royal Navy and five ships to be operated by the Royal Norwegian Navy.) with the claimed goal of hunting for Russian submarines in the North Atlantic. £1.6 billion is allocated for the integration of the Mark 41 vertical launching system and Naval Strike Missile for the Type 31.
- A £240 million investment in Project Pantheon, supporting the development of unmanned autonomous systems to develop a "Hybrid Carrier Air Wing", as well as collaborative combat aircraft to operate alongside the F-35B.
- An additional £90 million towards the procurement of offshore support vessels for autonomous mine-hunting. In addition, £540 million towards anti-submarine warfare capabilities and an additional £330 million in underwater infrastructure protection, including operational enhancements to RFA Proteus.
- Cancellation of the Multi-role strike ship amphibious warfare ships. Originally announced in May 2024, the vessels were to replace the service's Albion-class landing platform docks, Bay-class landing ship docks and the support ship RFA Argus. The program was shelved in favour of future United Kingdom participation in the Netherlands led Amphibious Transport Ship Programme.
- A realignment of amphibious warfare capabilities for the Royal Marines, with investment in the Joint Commando Craft alongside Norway, a further £100 million in funds to orient the UK Commando Force towards arctic warfare, and the replacement of legacy BvS10 Viking vehicles with 60 of the updated type to be delivered by March 2028.

=== Royal Air Force ===
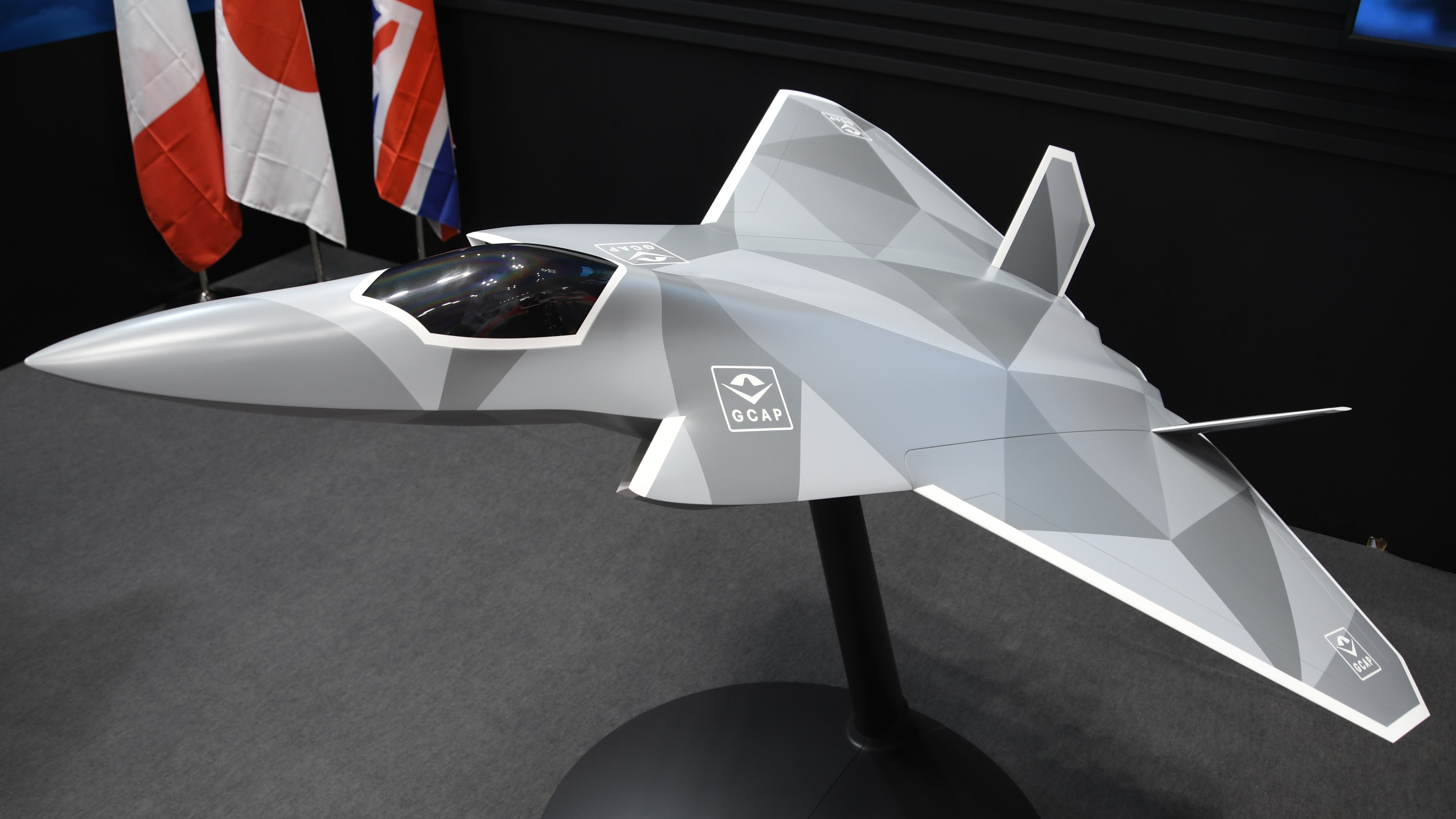
Global Combat Air Programme concept, 2024

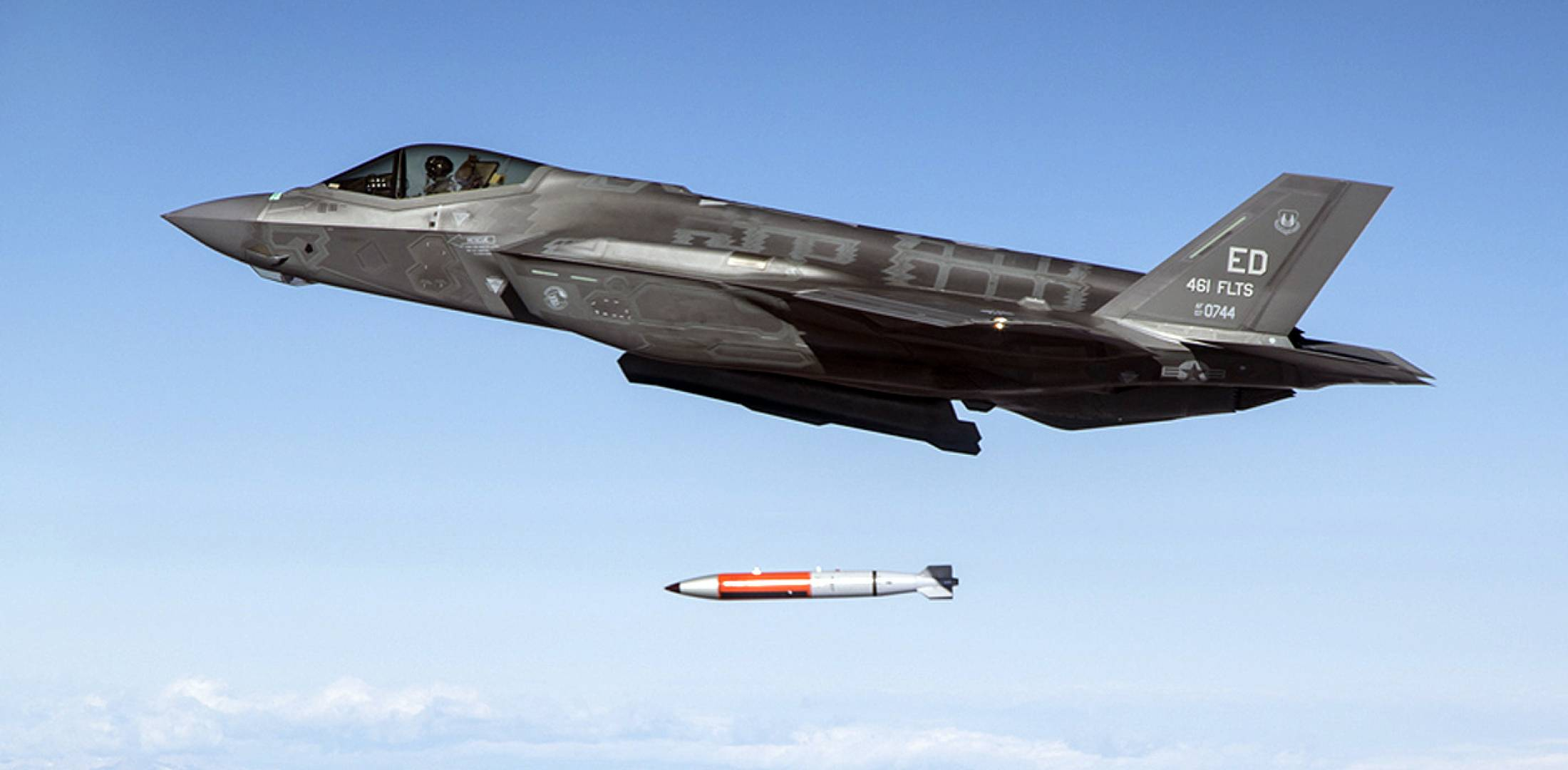
An F-35A Lightning with a B61 nuclear bomb

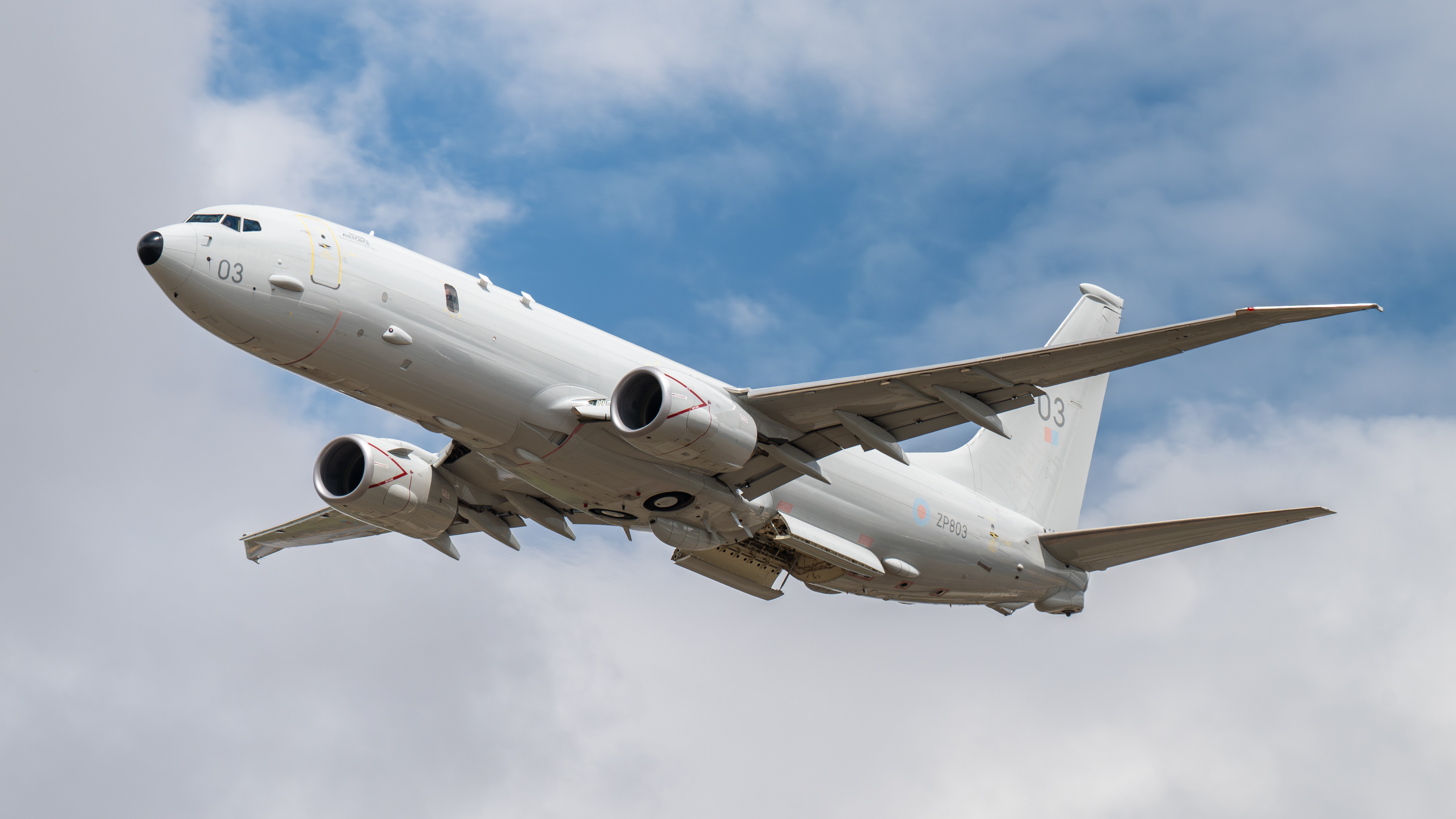
Boeing Poseidon

- Investment of £8.6 billion into the multinational Global Combat Air Programme for the development of a next generation combat aircraft. £300 million would also be allocated the for development of collaborative combat aircraft to operate alongside the aircraft.
- Continued investment of £1.1 billion to maintain and upgrade the services' fleet of Eurofighter Typhoon aircraft.
- £360 million recapitalisation for the UK Military Flying Training System to replace the aging BAE Systems Hawk jet trainer. The plan does not name a replacement aircraft, but likely candidates include the T-7 Red Hawk, M-346 Master and T-50 Golden Eagle. The British developed Aeralis AJT was also planned, but was placed under administration following a lack of funds in May 2026.
- Delivery of further F-35B, as well as the first of 12 nuclear capable F-35A aircraft, with the Royal Air Force joining the NATO Dual Capable Aircraft nuclear delivery system, reviving the Royal Air Force role in maintaining a nuclear deterrent for the first time since 1998. As a result, American B61-12 nuclear bombs are expected to be based on UK soil.
- Upgrades to the Boeing Poseidon, with £260 million allocated towards upgrading and equipping the aircraft with Sting Ray Mod 1 torpedoes.
- A £240 million investment in Project Presagium: the development of a counter-drone system initially for the RAF Regiment in base defence, with the potential to expand for further use.
- Early retirement of the Beechcraft Shadow R.1 ISTAR aircraft, to be superseded by autonomous systems.
- Early retirement of older Chinook variants, with new helicopter variants delivered in the 2030s.
