= Bay-class landing ship =

2006 class of British landing ships

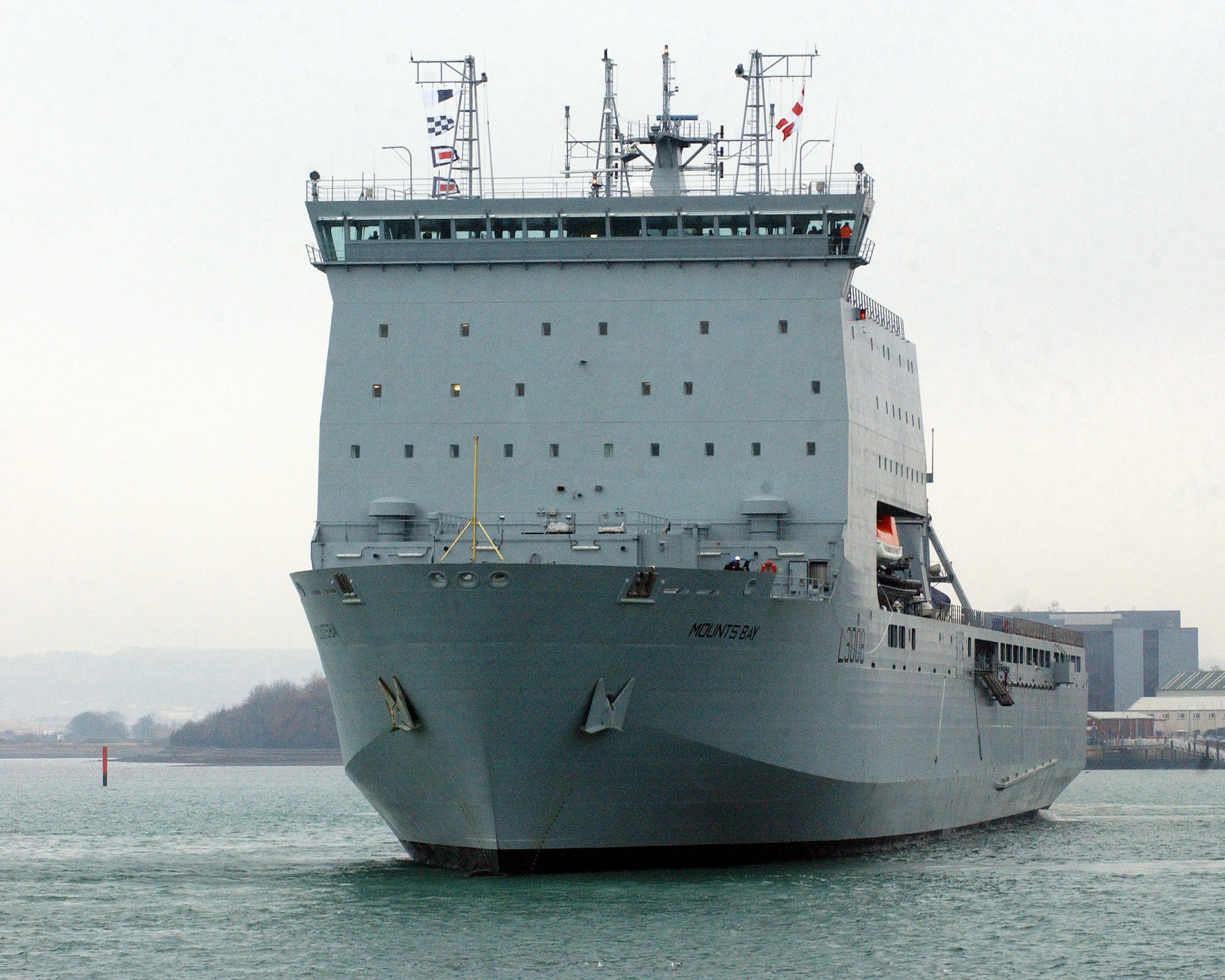
- RFA Mounts Bay leaving Portsmouth

Class overview
- Builders: Swan Hunter and BAE Systems Naval Ships
- Operators: Royal Fleet Auxiliary; Royal Australian Navy
- Preceded by: Round Table class
- Succeeded by: ATS-class amphibious warfare ship (planned)
- Cost: £596 million for 4 units; £149 million per unit; BAE ships cost £127 million per unit to build
- Built: 28 January 2002-26 November 2007
- In commission: 13 July 2006-present
- Completed: 4
- Active: 4

General characteristics
- Type: Landing ship dock
- Displacement: 16,160 tonnes (15,900 long tons)
- Length: 579.4 ft (176.6 m)
- Beam: 86.6 ft (26.4 m)
- Draught: 19 ft (5.8 m)
- Propulsion: 2 × Wärtsilä 8L26 generators, 6,000 hp (4.5 MW); 2 × Wärtsilä 12V26 generators, 9,000 hp (6.7 MW); 2 × azimuthing thrusters; 1 × bow thruster
- Speed: 18 knots (33 km/h; 21 mph)
- Range: 8,000 nmi (15,000 km; 9,200 mi) at 15 kn (28 km/h; 17 mph)
- Boats & landing craft carried: 1 × LCU or 2 × LCVP in well deck; 2 × Mexeflote powered rafts
- Capacity: 1,150 linear metres of vehicles (up to 24 Challenger 2 tanks or 150 light trucks) Cargo capacity of 200 tons ammunition or 24 TEU containers
- Troops: 356 (standard), 700 (overload)
- Crew: 70 (RFA, core only), 158 (RAN)
- Armament: Fitted for: 2 × DS30B Mk 1 30 mm guns; 2 × Phalanx CIWS; 4 × 7.62mm Mk44 Miniguns (may be replaced by Browning .50 caliber heavy machine guns as of 2023); 6 × 7.62mm L7 GPMG; Individual outfit varies across class
- Aviation facilities: Flight deck for helicopters up to Chinook-size; temporary hangar can be fitted
- Notes: Derivative of the Enforcer ship design

The Bay class is a ship class of four dock landing ships built for the British Royal Fleet Auxiliary (RFA) during the 2000s. They are based on the Dutch-Spanish Royal Schelde Enforcer design, and replaced the Round Table-class logistics ships. Two ships each were ordered from Swan Hunter and BAE Systems Naval Ships. Construction work started in 2002, but saw major delays and cost overruns, particularly at Swan Hunter's shipyard. In mid-2006, Swan Hunter was stripped of work, and the incomplete second ship was towed to BAE's shipyard for completion. All four ships, Largs Bay, Lyme Bay, Mounts Bay, and Cardigan Bay had entered service by 2007.

Since entering service, the Bay-class ships have been used for amphibious operations, training of the Iraqi Navy in the Persian Gulf, counter-drug deployments in the Caribbean, and relief operations following the 2010 Haiti earthquake. In 2010, Largs Bay was removed from service as part of the Strategic Defence and Security Review. She was sold to the Royal Australian Navy (RAN) in 2011, who operate her as HMAS Choules.

Since 2020, the RFA has used the ships for littoral warfare as part of Littoral Response Groups. The ships are expected to serve with the RFA into the 2030s, after which they were originally expected to be replaced by new Multi-Role Support Ships. However, this project was cancelled in the 2026 Defence Investment Plan in favor of the joint-Anglo-Dutch ATS-class amphibious warfare ship.

== Development ==
The Bay class was designed as a replacement for the five Round Table-class logistics ships operated by the RFA. Planning for the class began in the 1990s, after the original intent to modernise and extend the service life of three Round Tables ran into problems with extensive corrosion and problems implementing new safety standards. After the first Round Table returned to service two years late and after excessive cost, the Ministry of Defence began to investigate the acquisition of new ships.

In April 2000, the MoD released an Invitation to Tender for two ships under a budget of £150 million, with the option to acquire three more. Appledore Shipbuilders, BAE Systems Naval Ships and Swan Hunter submitted tenders, but only Swan Hunter's design met all the tender requirements, at a price of £148 million. A shortfall of work for BAE's Govan yard led to fears that it could not deliver the Type 45 destroyers and Queen Elizabeth-class aircraft carriers planned for later in the decade, so the Treasury agreed to fund an additional two LSDs to be built at Govan.

=== Construction ===
The contract for Largs Bay and Lyme Bay was awarded to Swan Hunter on 18 December 2000 and the £122 million contract for Mounts Bay and Cardigan Bay was awarded to BAE on 19 November 2001. Construction on Largs Bay started at Swan Hunter on 28 January 2002, and on Mounts Bay at BAE on 25 August 2002.

Swan Hunter struggled to manage the project and contain costs; only 7% of the design drawings were provided on time and more than 52% were over a year late. Swan Hunter's owner, Jaap Kroese, has blamed the MoD for continually changing the specifications. The extent of the problems only came to light in September 2003, when Swan Hunter said they could not fulfill the contract at the agreed price. In November 2004, progress on Largs Bay was delayed by water entering two engines during engine trials, putting the planned first of class behind work on BAE's first ship. The following month the government agreed to pay Swan Hunter an extra £84 million under new contract terms, but in June 2005 Swan Hunter said that they still could not finish the job within budget. This led to their contract being cancelled and BAE taking over the project in July 2006. In total Swan Hunter had been paid £342 million and BAE £254 million, making a total of £596 million for the four ships.

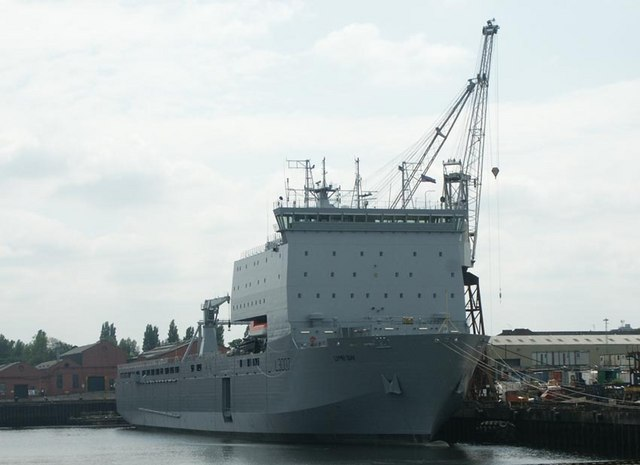
Lyme Bay being fitted out at BAE's Govan shipyard in early 2007. The hull of this vessel was built by Swan Hunter on the river Tyne, but was transferred to BAE for completion in 2006.

Mounts Bay entered service in July 2006, followed by Largs Bay in November of that year, 28 months later than originally planned. The incomplete Lyme Bay was towed to Govan for completion by BAE. Lyme Bay was dedicated on 26 November 2007; the last ship of the class to enter RFA service. The ship was the only warship built by Swan Hunter but not completed; she marked the end of shipbuilding on the Tyne, as soon afterwards Swan Hunter sold its equipment to India and reinvented itself as an engineering consultancy.

== Characteristics ==
The Bay class is certified as a class 1 passenger ship, with design similarities to ro-pax ferries. The design is based on the Royal Schelde Enforcer, a joint project between the Dutch and Spanish resulting in the Rotterdam-class and Galicia-class amphibious warfare ships. The main difference is that the British ships have no helicopter hangar. The ships were originally designated Auxiliary Landing Ship Logistics (ALSL), but this was changed in 2002 to Landing Ship Dock (Auxiliary) (LSD(A)), better reflecting their operational role and bringing them into line with the NATO designation for the Royal Schelde vessels.

The Bay-class ships have a full load displacement of 16,160 tonnes (15,900 long tons). They are 579.4 feet (176.6 m) long, with a beam of 86.6 feet (26.4 m), and a draught of 19 feet (5.8 m). Propulsion power is provided by two Wärtsilä 8L26 generators, providing 6,000 horsepower (4.5 MW), and two Wärtsilä 12V26 generators, providing 9,000 horsepower (6.7 MW). These are used to drive two steerable azimuthing thrusters, with a bow thruster supplementing. Maximum speed is 18 knots (33 km/h; 21 mph), and the Bay-class ships can achieve a range of 8,000 nautical miles (15,000 km; 9,200 mi) at 15 knots (28 km/h; 17 mph). The ships were designed to receive an armament of two Phalanx CIWS, two manual 30 mm DS30B cannon and various small arms, but the exact weapons fit varies within the class.

In British service, the everyday ship's company consisted of 60 to 70 RFA personnel, with this number supplemented by members of the British Armed Forces when the ships are deployed operationally. For example, Largs Bay's deployment in response to the 2010 Haiti earthquake saw her sail with a core crew of 70, plus 40 Royal Logistic Corps personnel for boat- and cargo-handling duties, and 17 from the Royal Navy and Royal Marines for security and related tasks. Australia operates Choules with a permanent crew of 158 including a Ship's Army Department of 22.

As a sealift ship, each Bay-class vessel is capable of carrying up to 24 Challenger 2 tanks or 150 light trucks in 1,150 linear metres of space, with stern- and side-ramp access to the vehicle deck. The cargo capacity is equivalent of 200 tons of ammunition, or 24 twenty-foot equivalent unit containers. During normal conditions, a Bay-class ship can carry 356 soldiers, but this can be almost doubled to 700 in overload conditions. The flight deck is capable of handling helicopters up to the size of Chinooks, as well as Merlin helicopters and Osprey tiltrotor aircraft. There is no hangar for long-term embarkation of a helicopter, although a temporary shelter can be fitted to house a Merlin or smaller helicopter. The well dock can carry one LCU Mark 10 or two LCVPs, and two Mexeflotes can be suspended from the ship's flanks. Two 30-ton cranes are fitted between the superstructure and the flight deck. Internal passages are wide enough to allow two fully kitted marines to pass each other.

== Operational history ==
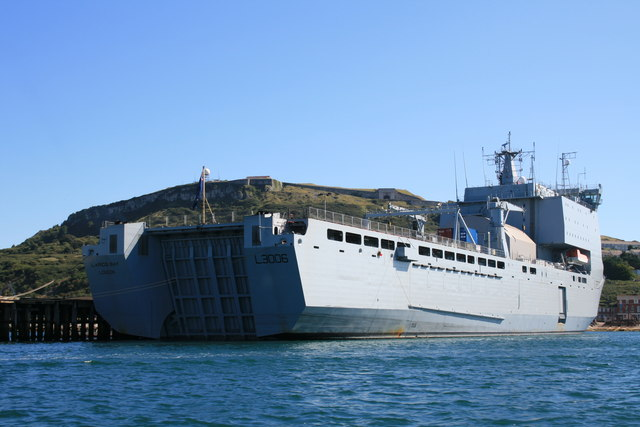
RFA Largs Bay in Portland Harbour, August 2009

In 2006 Mounts Bay took part in Operation Vela, a major amphibious exercise off West Africa.

In mid-April 2007, Cardigan Bay sailed for "Operation Orion 07", a four-month deployment to the Mediterranean. From 2008 until the end of 2010, Cardigan Bay was used to accommodate and train personnel of the Iraqi Navy under the tutelage of Royal Navy and United States Navy personnel. During this time, the ship operated almost exclusively in the Persian Gulf.

In late November 2007, Largs Bay was deployed to the Caribbean for counter-drug operations. During the deployment, the ship visited ports across the Caribbean islands and the United States mainland, and intercepted a 575-kilogram (1,268 lb) cocaine shipment. In late 2008, it was reported that Largs Bay was to replace the frigate Northumberland for duties in the Falkland Islands. Northumberland was to have left for the Islands in December 2008, but was instead sent for an anti-pirate patrol off Somalia.

On 3 February 2010, Largs Bay headed to Haiti with aid supplies for relief efforts after the earthquake. On 18 February 2010, she arrived at Port-au-Prince and commenced unloading of the supplies. On 30 March 2010, she returned home.

In December 2010, it was announced that a Bay-class vessel, later identified as Largs Bay, would be decommissioned in April 2011 as part of the Strategic Defence and Security Review. On 17 March 2011, the Australian Department of Defence announced that the RAN would be bidding for Largs Bay; this was followed on 6 April by news that a £65 million (A$100 million) bid had been successful. She was commissioned into the RAN on 13 December 2011 as HMAS Choules, after receiving modifications for service in tropical conditions. A transformer in the propulsion system failed when she was en route to a training area on 14 June 2012, after earlier reports that the ship could not maintain top speed without transformers overheating. An insulation failure had short-circuited the failed transformer, while others aboard were showing signs of premature wear. With no spares available, the need to order from the manufacturer combined with the decision to replace all of the transformers aboard meant that Choules was kept out of service until April 2013.

In June 2011, Cardigan Bay headed to Yemen to aid with the potential evacuation of British citizens affected by the ongoing unrest there.

== Ships in the class ==
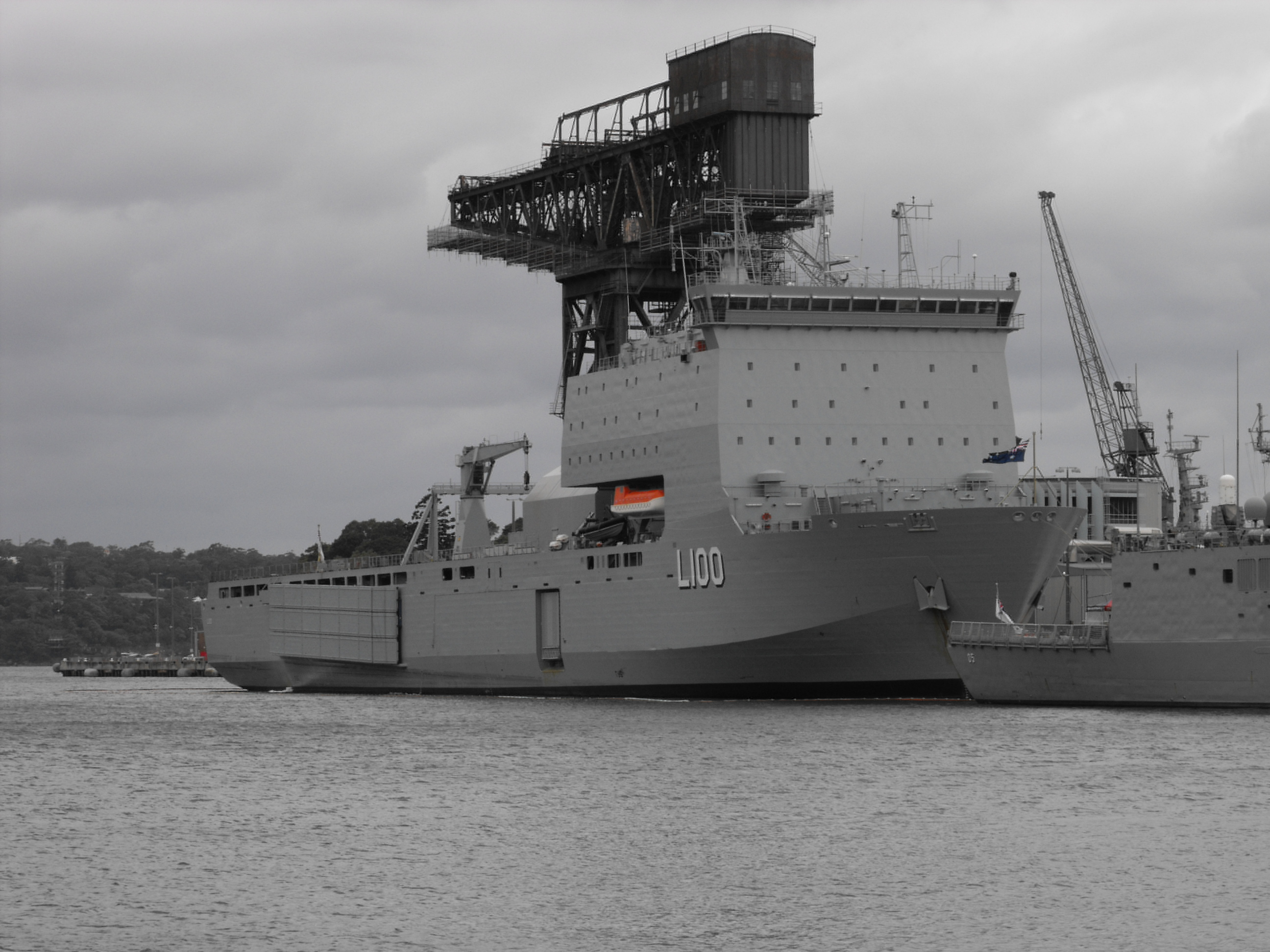
HMAS Choules at Fleet Base East in January 2012

Royal Fleet Auxiliary
| Name | Laid down | Launched | In service | Out of service | Notes |
|---|---|---|---|---|---|
| RFA Largs Bay (L3006) | 28 January 2002 | 18 July 2003 | 28 November 2006 | April 2011 | Sold to RAN in April 2011 |
| RFA Lyme Bay (L3007) | 22 November 2002 | 3 September 2005 | 26 November 2007 | - | Active |
| RFA Mounts Bay (L3008) | 25 August 2002 | 9 April 2004 | 13 July 2006 | - | Active, completing refit as of mid-2025 |
| RFA Cardigan Bay (L3009) | 13 October 2003 | 8–9 April 2005 | 18 December 2006 | - | Undergoing refit as of April 2026 |
Royal Australian Navy
| Name | Acquired | | In service | Out of service | Notes |
| HMAS Choules (L100) (ex-Largs Bay) | 6 April 2011 | | 13 December 2011 | | Active as of Apr 2023 |

== See also ==
- List of amphibious warfare ships of the Royal Fleet Auxiliary
- Future of the Royal Navy
- Royal Fleet Auxiliary
