= History of the Royal Navy (after 1707) =

The history of the Royal Navy reached an important juncture in 1707, when the Act of Union merged the kingdoms of England and Scotland into the Kingdom of Great Britain, following a century of personal union between the two countries. This had the effect of merging the Royal Scots Navy into the Royal Navy. The Navy grew considerably during the global struggle with France that had started in 1690 and culminated in the Napoleonic Wars, a time when the practice of fighting under sail was developed to its highest point. The ensuing century of general peace saw Britain virtually uncontested on the seas, and considerable technological development. Sail yielded to steam and cannon supplanted by large shell-firing guns, and ending with the race to construct bigger and better battleships. That race, however, was ultimately a dead end, as aircraft carriers and submarines came to the fore and, after the successes of World War II, the Royal Navy yielded its formerly preeminent place to the United States Navy. The Royal Navy has remained one of the world's most capable navies and currently operates a fleet of modern ships, though the size of the fleet has declined significantly since the 1980s.

== A united navy and resurgent France 1707–1815 ==
=== Wars with France and Spain, 1707–1748 ===
From 1603 until their union in 1707, Scotland and England possessed separate navies that operated as one force – albeit for a period of Anglo-Scottish hostilities during the interregnum (1649–1660). Thomas Gordon became the last commander of the Royal Scots Navy, taking charge of HMS Royal Mary on the North Sea patrol, moving to Royal William when she entered service in 1705, and being promoted to commodore in 1706. With the Act of Union in 1707, the Royal Scottish Navy was merged with the English Royal Navy, but there were already much larger English ships called Royal William and Mary, so the Scottish frigates were renamed HMS Edinburgh and HMS Glasgow, while only HMS Dumbarton Castle retained its name.

The Act of Union took effect mid-way through the War of Spanish Succession, which saw the Navy operate in conjunction with the Dutch against the navies of France and Spain, in support of the efforts of Britain's Austrian Habsburg allies to seize control of Spain and its Mediterranean dependencies from the Bourbons. Amphibious operations by the Anglo-Dutch fleet brought about the capture of Sardinia, the Balearic Islands and a number of Spanish mainland ports, most importantly Barcelona. While most of these gains were turned over to the Habsburgs, Britain held on to Gibraltar and Menorca, which were retained in the peace settlement, providing the Navy with Mediterranean bases. Early in the war French naval squadrons had done considerable damage to English and Dutch commercial convoys. However, a major victory over France and Spain at Vigo Bay (1702), further successes in battle, and the scuttling of the entire French Mediterranean fleet at Toulon in 1707 virtually cleared the Navy's opponents from the seas for the latter part of the war. Naval operations also enabled the conquest of the French colonies in Nova Scotia and Newfoundland. Further conflict with Spain followed in the War of the Quadruple Alliance (1718–1720), in which the Navy helped thwart a Spanish attempt to regain Sicily and Sardinia from Austria and Savoy, defeating a Spanish fleet at Cape Passaro (1718), and in an undeclared war in the 1720s, in which Spain tried to retake Gibraltar and Menorca.

The subsequent quarter-century of peace saw a few naval actions. The navy was used against Russia and Sweden in the Baltic from 1715 to 1727 to protect supplies of naval stores. It was used at Cape Passaro during the War of the Quadruple Alliance in 1718, during the Great Northern War, and in the West Indies in 1726. Another war with Spain broke out in 1727, which saw the Royal Navy dispatch a fleet to resupply the British garrison in Gibraltar, which proved crucial in repelling a Spanish siege. In 1745, the Royal Navy contributed to collapse of the Jacobite rising.

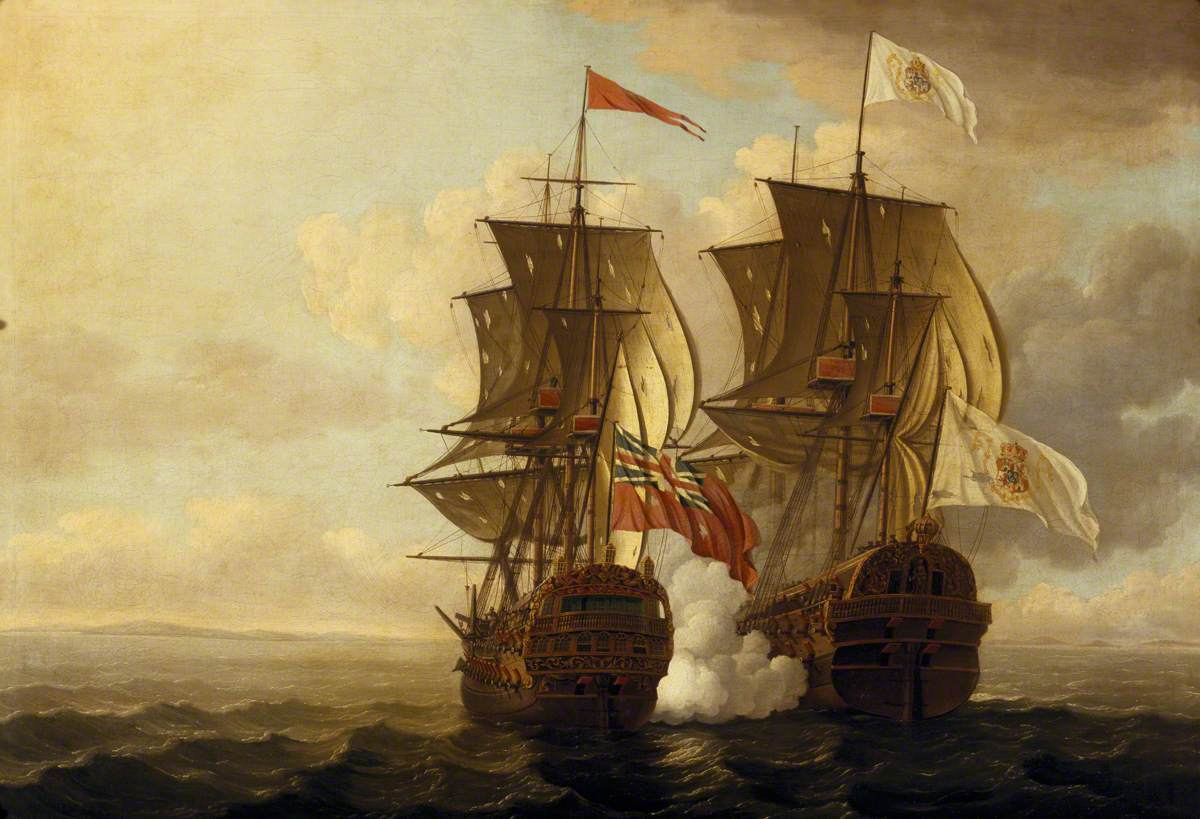
George Anson's capture of the Manila galleon Nuestra Señora de Covadonga on 20 April 1743

After a period of relative peace, the Navy became engaged in the War of Jenkins' Ear (1739–1748) against Spain, which was dominated by a series of costly and mostly unsuccessful attacks on Spanish ports in the Caribbean, primarily a huge expedition against Cartagena de Indias in 1741. These led to heavy loss of life from tropical diseases. In 1742 the Kingdom of the Two Sicilies was driven to withdraw from the war in the space of half an hour by the threat of a bombardment of its capital Naples by a small British squadron. The war became subsumed in the wider War of the Austrian Succession (1744–1748), once again pitting Britain against France. Naval fighting in this war, which for the first time included major operations in the Indian Ocean, was largely inconclusive, the most significant event being the failure of an attempted French invasion of England in 1744.

Total naval losses in the War of the Austrian Succession, including ships lost in storms and in shipwrecks were: France—20 ships-of-the-line, 16 frigates, 20 smaller ships, 2,185 merchantmen, 1,738 guns; Spain—17 ships-of-the-line, 7 frigates, 1,249 merchantmen, 1,276 guns; Britain—14 ships-of-the-line, 7 frigates, 28 smaller ships, 3,238 merchantmen, 1,012 guns. Personnel losses at sea were about 12,000 killed, wounded, or taken prisoner for France, 11,000 for Spain, and 7,000 for Britain.

=== Seven Years' War, 1756–1763 ===
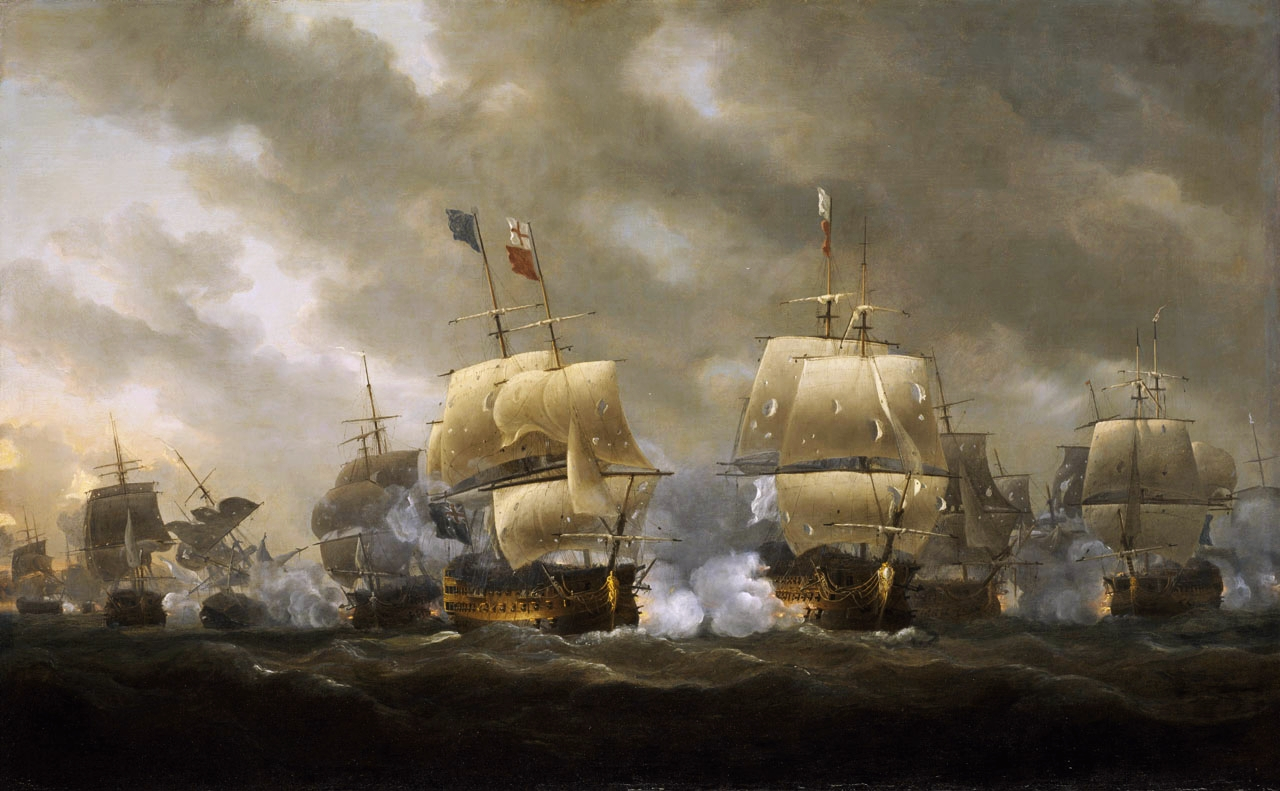
The Battle of Quiberon Bay which ended the French invasion plans in 1759

The subsequent Seven Years' War (1756–1763) saw the Navy conduct amphibious campaigns leading to the conquest of New France, of French colonies in the Caribbean and West Africa, and of small islands off the French coast, while operations in the Indian Ocean contributed to the destruction of French power in India. Admiral John Byng failed to relieve Minorca; he was executed on his own quarterdeck. Voltaire famously wrote, in reference to Byng's execution, that "in this country it is wise to kill an admiral from time to time to encourage the others" (admirals). (Today the French phrase "pour encourager les autres" used in English euphemistically connotes a threat by example.) Minorca was lost but subsequent operations went more successfully (due more to government support and better strategic thinking, rather than admirals "encouraged" by Byng's example), and the British fleet won several victories, starting with the Battle of Cartagena in 1758.

The French tried to invade Britain in 1759 but their force was defeated at the Battle of Quiberon Bay off the coast of Brittany, fought in a gale on a dangerous lee shore. Once again the British fleet effectively eliminated the French Navy from the war, leading France to abandon major operations. Spain entered the war against Britain in 1762 but lost Havana and Manila, though the latter was given back in exchange for Florida. Britain was also able to seize the Spanish fleet that had been sheltering at Havana. The Treaty of Paris ended the war.

Naval losses of the Seven Years' War testify to the extent of the British victory. France lost 20 of her ships-of-the-line captured and 25 sunk, burned, destroyed, or lost in storms. The French navy also lost 25 frigates captured and 17 destroyed, and suffered casualties of 20,000 killed, drowned, or missing, as well as another 20,000 wounded or captured. Spain lost 12 ships-of-the-line captured or destroyed, 4 frigates, and 10,000 seamen killed, wounded, or captured. The Royal Navy lost 2 ships-of-the-line captured, 17 sunk or destroyed by either battle or storm, 3 frigates captured and 14 sunk, but added 40 ships-of-the-line during the course of the war. British crews suffered 20,000 casualties, including POWs. Actual naval combat deaths for Britain were only 1,500, but the figure of 133,708 is given for those who died of sickness or deserted.

=== American Revolutionary War, 1775–1783 ===
The moonlight Battle of Cape St Vincent, 16 January 1780

British America was a strategically significant location for the Royal Navy because it provided much of its timber supply. The Royal Navy also began to have a larger presence there during the American Revolution in order to suppress illegal smuggling to evade the Townshend Acts and the Navigation Acts. The Gaspee Affair in which a revenue cutter ran aground in Rhode Island and was attacked led colonial legislatures starting with the Virginia House of Burgesses to form committees of correspondence.

At the beginning of the American Revolutionary War (1775–1783), the Royal Navy dealt with the fledgling Continental Navy handily, destroying or capturing many of its vessels. However, France soon took the American side, and in 1778 a French fleet sailed for America, where it attempted to land at Rhode Island and nearly engaged with the British fleet before a storm intervened, while back home another fought the British in the First Battle of Ushant. Spain and the Dutch Republic entered the war in 1780. Also the same year a large British convoy of 63 ships was captured by a Franco-Spanish fleet, which dealt a severe blow to the commerce of Great Britain. Action shifted to the Caribbean, where there were a number of battles with varying results. A Spanish fleet was defeated at the battle of Cape Saint Vincent in 1780 while a Franco-Spanish fleet was defeated at the Battle of the Saintes in 1782. The most important operation came in 1781 when, in the Battle of the Chesapeake, the British failed to lift the French blockade of Lord Cornwallis, resulting in a British surrender in the Battle of Yorktown. Although combat was over in North America, it continued in the Caribbean and India, where the British experienced both successes and failures. Though Minorca had been recaptured, it was returned to the Spanish. The relief of Gibraltar later the same year symbolised the restoration of British naval ascendancy, but this came too late to prevent the independence of the Thirteen Colonies.

The eradication of scurvy from the Royal Navy in the 1790s came about due to the efforts of Gilbert Blane, chairman of the Navy's Sick and Hurt Board, which ordered fresh lemon juice to be given to sailors on ships. Other navies soon adopted this successful solution.

=== French Revolutionary and Napoleonic Wars (1793–1815) ===
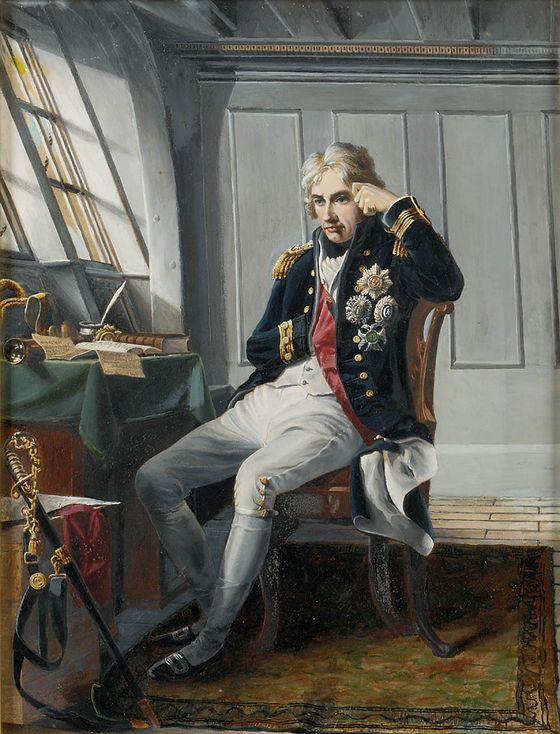
Admiral Horatio Nelson, 1758–1805

The French Revolutionary Wars of 1793–1802 and the Napoleonic Wars of 1803–15 saw the Royal Navy reach a peak of efficiency, dominating the navies of all Britain's adversaries. Initially Britain did not involve itself in the French Revolution, but in 1793 France declared war, leading to the Glorious First of June battle in the following year off Brest, followed by the capture of French colonies in the Caribbean. The Dutch Republic declared war in 1795 and Spain in 1796, on the side of France. Further action came in 1797 and 1798, with the Battle of Cape St Vincent and the Battle of the Nile (also known as the Battle of Aboukir Bay), which brought Admiral Horatio Nelson to the public's attention. The latter engagement cut off Napoleon's expedition to Egypt, though French forces remained in control of that country for three more years. In 1800, Russia, Sweden and Denmark–Norway formed the Second League of Armed Neutrality to resist British attempts to search their merchant shipping for French goods, and in 1801 the Danes closed their ports to British shipping. As the league did nothing about French searches, the British viewed its existence as a pro-French alliance and in 1801 sent a fleet to the Baltic. The fleet defeated the Danish navy at the Battle of Copenhagen, and the league soon dissolved.

The Peace of Amiens in 1802 proved to be but a brief interruption in the years of warfare, and the Navy was soon blockading Napoleon's France. In 1805 French invasion forces were massed on the French coast with 2,300 vessels. The French fleet at Toulon went to the West Indies where it was intended to meet the Spanish one but it was chased by the British fleet and returned without meeting up. After fighting an action off Finisterre the French fleet withdrew to Cadiz where it met up with the Spanish one. The height of the Navy's achievements came on 21 October 1805 at the Battle of Trafalgar where a numerically smaller but more experienced British fleet under the command of Admiral Lord Nelson decisively defeated the combined French and Spanish fleet. The victory at Trafalgar consolidated the United Kingdom's advantage over other European maritime powers, but Nelson was killed during the battle.

By concentrating its military resources in the navy, Britain could both defend itself and project its power across the oceans as well as threaten rivals' ocean trading routes. Britain therefore needed to maintain only a relatively small, highly mobile, professional army that sailed to where it was needed, and was supported by the navy with bombardment, movement, supplies and reinforcement. The Navy could cut off enemies' sea-borne supplies, as with Napoleon's army in Egypt.

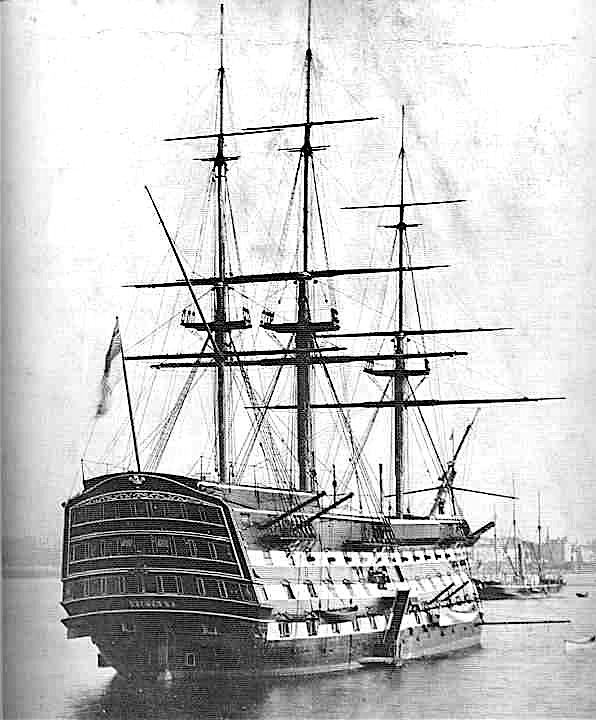
HMS Victory in 1884

Theoretically, the highest commands of the Royal Navy were open to all within its ranks showing talent. In practice, family connections, political or professional patronage were very important for promotion to ranks higher than commander. British captains were responsible for recruiting their ship's crew from a combination of volunteers, impressment and the requisitioning of existing crew members from ships in ordinary. From 1795 a Quota System was also applied, where each British county was required to supply a certain number of volunteers. Many nationalities served on British ships, with foreigners comprising fifteen per cent of crews by the end of the Napoleonic Wars. Americans were the most common foreign nationality in naval service, followed by Dutch, Scandinavian and Italian. While most foreigners in the Navy were obtained through impressment or from prison ships, around 200 captured French sailors were also persuaded to join after their fleet was defeated at the Battle of the Nile.

The conditions of service for ordinary seamen, while poor by modern standards, were better than many other kinds of work at the time. However, inflation during the late 18th century eroded the real value of seamen's pay while, at the same time, the war caused an increase in pay for merchant ships. Naval pay also often ran years in arrears, and shore leave decreased as ships needed to spend less time in port with better provisioning and health care, and copper bottoms (which delayed fouling). Discontent over these issues eventually resulted in serious mutinies in 1797 when the crews of the Spithead and Nore fleets refused to obey their officers and some captains were sent ashore. This resulted in the short-lived "Floating Republic" which at Spithead was quelled by promising improvements in conditions, but at the Nore resulted in the hanging of 29 mutineers. It is worth noting that neither of the mutinies included flogging or impressment in their list of grievances and, in fact, the mutineers themselves continued the practice of flogging to preserve discipline.

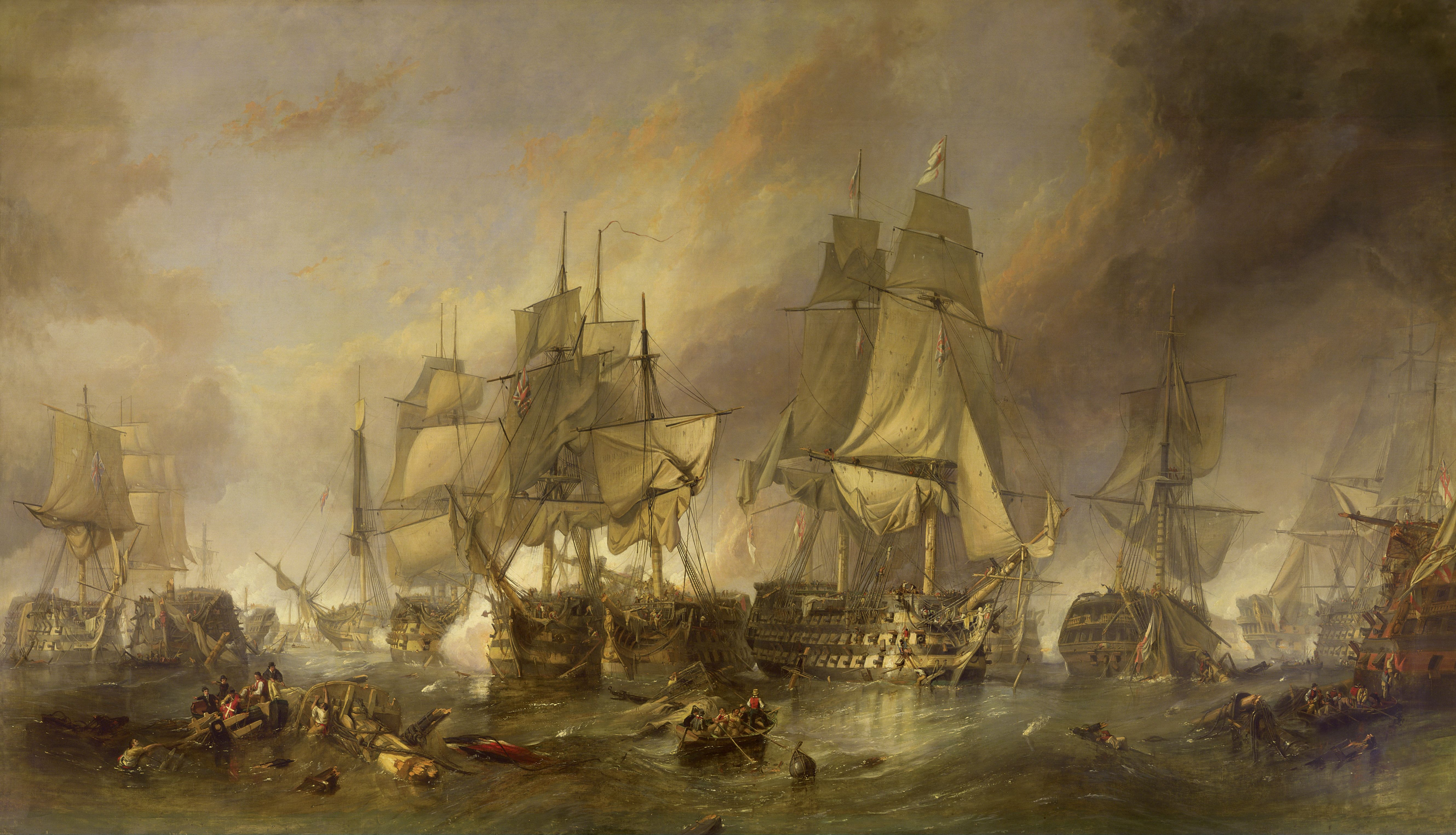
The Battle of Trafalgar, 21 October 1805, by Clarkson Stanfield

Napoleon acted to counter Britain's maritime supremacy and economic power, closing European ports to British trade through the Continental System. He also authorised many privateers, operating from French territories in the West Indies, placing great pressure on British mercantile shipping in the Western Hemisphere. The Royal Navy was too hard-pressed in European waters to release significant forces to combat the privateers, and its large ships of the line were not very effective at seeking out and running down fast and manoeuvrable privateers which operated as widely spread single ships or small groups. The Royal Navy reacted by commissioning small warships of traditional Bermuda design. The first three ordered from Bermudian builders—HMS Dasher, HMS Driver and HMS Hunter—were sloops of 200 tons, armed with twelve 24-pounder guns. A great many more ships of this type were ordered, or bought from trade, primarily for use as couriers. The most notable was HMS Pickle, the former Bermudian merchantman that carried news of victory back from Trafalgar. At the end of the war the manning levels of the Royal Navy decreased sharply from 145,000 to 19,000.

Although brief in retrospect, the years of the Napoleonic wars came to be remembered as the apotheosis of "fighting sail", and stories of the Royal Navy at this period have been told and retold regularly since then, most famously in the Horatio Hornblower series of C. S. Forrester.

=== War of 1812 ===
In the years following the battle of Trafalgar there was increasing tension at sea between Britain and the United States. American traders took advantage of their country's neutrality to trade with both the French-controlled parts of Europe, and Britain. Both France and Britain tried to prevent each other's trade, but only the Royal Navy was in a position to enforce a blockade. Another irritant was the suspected presence of British deserters aboard US merchant and naval vessels. Royal Navy ships often attempted to recover these deserters. In one notorious instance in 1807, otherwise known as the Chesapeake–Leopard affair, HMS Leopard fired on USS Chesapeake causing significant casualties before boarding and seizing suspected British deserters.

In 1812, while the Napoleonic wars continued, the United States declared war on Great Britain and tried to invade Canada. Occupied by its struggle with France, British policy was to commit only sufficient forces to the American War of 1812 to prevent American victory. On land, this meant a great reliance on militia and Native American allies. On the water, the Royal Navy kept its large men-of-war in Europe, relying on smaller vessels to counter the weak United States Navy. Some of the action consisted of small-scale engagements on the Great Lakes.

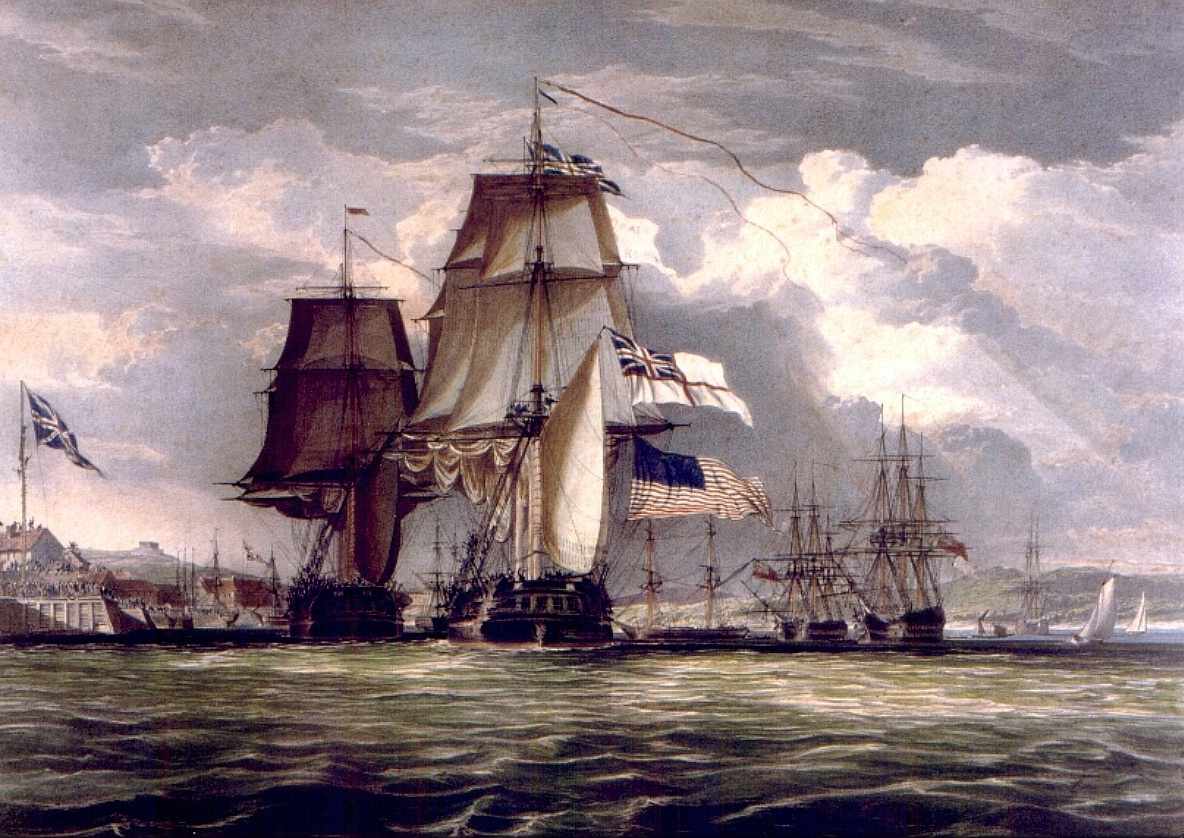
An 1830 representation of HMS Shannon leading the captured American frigate Chesapeake into Halifax, Nova Scotia, in June 1813

At sea, the War of 1812 was characterised by single-ship actions between small ships, and disruption of merchant shipping. The Royal Navy struggled to build as many ships as it could, generally sacrificing on the size and armament of vessels, and struggled harder to find adequate personnel, trained or barely trained, to crew them. Many of the men crewing Royal Naval vessels were rated only as landsmen, and many of those rated as seamen were impressed (conscripted), with resultingly poor morale. The US Navy could not begin to equal the Royal Navy in number of vessels, and had concentrated in building a handful of better-designed frigates. These were larger, heavier and better-armed (both in terms of number of guns, and in the range to which the guns could fire) than their British counterparts, and were handled by larger volunteer crews (where the Royal Navy was hindered by a relative shortage of trained seamen, the US Navy was not large enough to make full use of the large number of American merchant seamen put out of work, even before the war, by the Embargo Act). As a result of the American frigates being larger some British ships were defeated and, midway through the war, the Admiralty issued the order not to engage American frigates individually.

The most important aspect of the Royal Navy's involvement of The war of 1812 was the blockade it enforced on America and American shipping. Twenty ships were on station in 1812 and 135 were in place by the end of the conflict. In March 1813, the Royal Navy punished the Southern states, who were most vocal about annexing British North America, by blockading Charleston, Port Royal, Savannah and New York City was well. However, as additional ships were sent to North America in 1813, the Royal Navy was able to tighten the blockade and extend it, first to the coast south of Narragansett by November 1813 and to the entire American coast on 31 May 1814. In May 1814, following the abdication of Napoleon, and the end of the supply problems with Wellington's army, New England was blockaded. The blockade was so significant to British victory at sea that it confined most merchant and naval vessels to port. The American frigates USS United States and USS Macedonian ended the war blockaded and hulked in New London, Connecticut. USS United States and USS Macedonian attempted to set sail to raid British shipping in the Caribbean, but were forced to turn back when confronted with a British squadron, and by the end of the war, the United States had six frigates and four ships-of-the-line sitting in port.

The blockade resulted in American exports decreasing from $130 million in 1807 to $7 million in 1814. Most of these were food exports that ironically went to supply their enemies in Britain or British colonies. The blockade had a devastating effect on the American economy with the value of American exports and imports falling from $114 million in 1811 down to $20 million by 1814 while the US Customs took in $13 million in 1811 and $6 million in 1814, despite the fact that Congress had voted to double the rates. The British blockade further damaged the American economy by forcing merchants to abandon the cheap and fast coastal trade to the slow and more expensive inland roads. In 1814, only 1 out of 14 American merchantmen risked leaving port as a high probability that any ship leaving port would be seized.

Despite successful American claims for damage having been pressed in British courts against British privateers several years before, the War was probably the last occasion on which the Royal Navy made considerable reliance on privateers to boost Britain's maritime power. In Bermuda, privateering had thrived until the build-up of the regular Royal Naval establishment, which began in 1795, reduced the Admiralty's reliance on privateers in the Western Atlantic. During the American War of 1812, however, Bermudian privateers alone captured 298 enemy ships (the total captures by all British naval and privateering vessels between the Great Lakes and the West Indies was 1,593 vessels.)

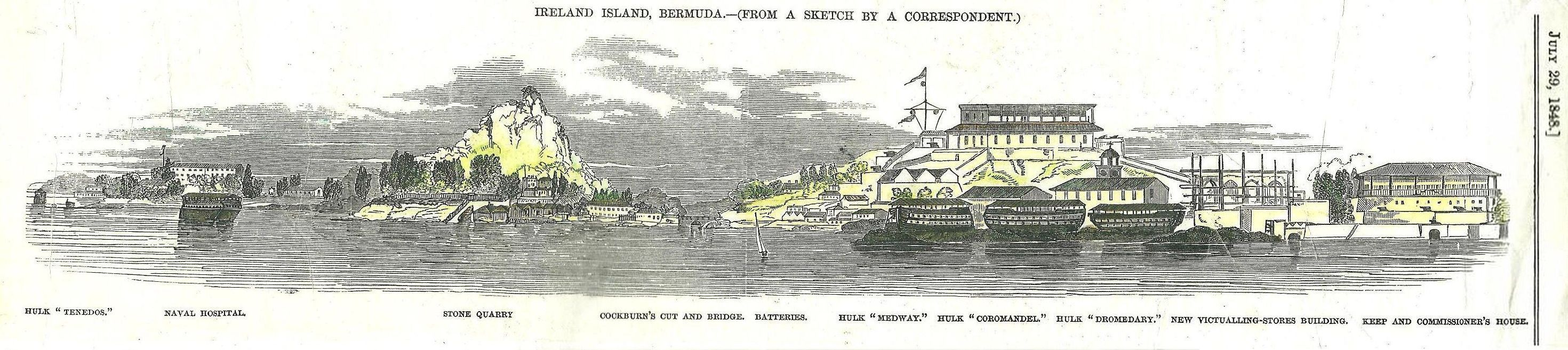
1848 Woodcut of the Royal Naval Dockyard, Bermuda (HMD Bermuda), Ireland Island

By this time, the Royal Navy was building a naval base and dockyard in Bermuda. It had begun buying land, mostly at the West End of Bermuda, notably Ireland Island, following American independence, permanently establishing itself in the colony in 1795. The development of the intended site was delayed by a dozen years as a suitable passage through the surrounding reefline needed to be located. Until then, the Royal Navy operated from the old capital in the East End, St. George's. Bermuda replaced Newfoundland initially as the winter base of the North America and West Indies Squadron, and then as its year-round headquarters, naval station, and dockyard, with its Admiralty House at Mount Wyndham, in Bailey's Bay, and then at Spanish Point, opposite Ireland Island on the mouth of Great Sound.

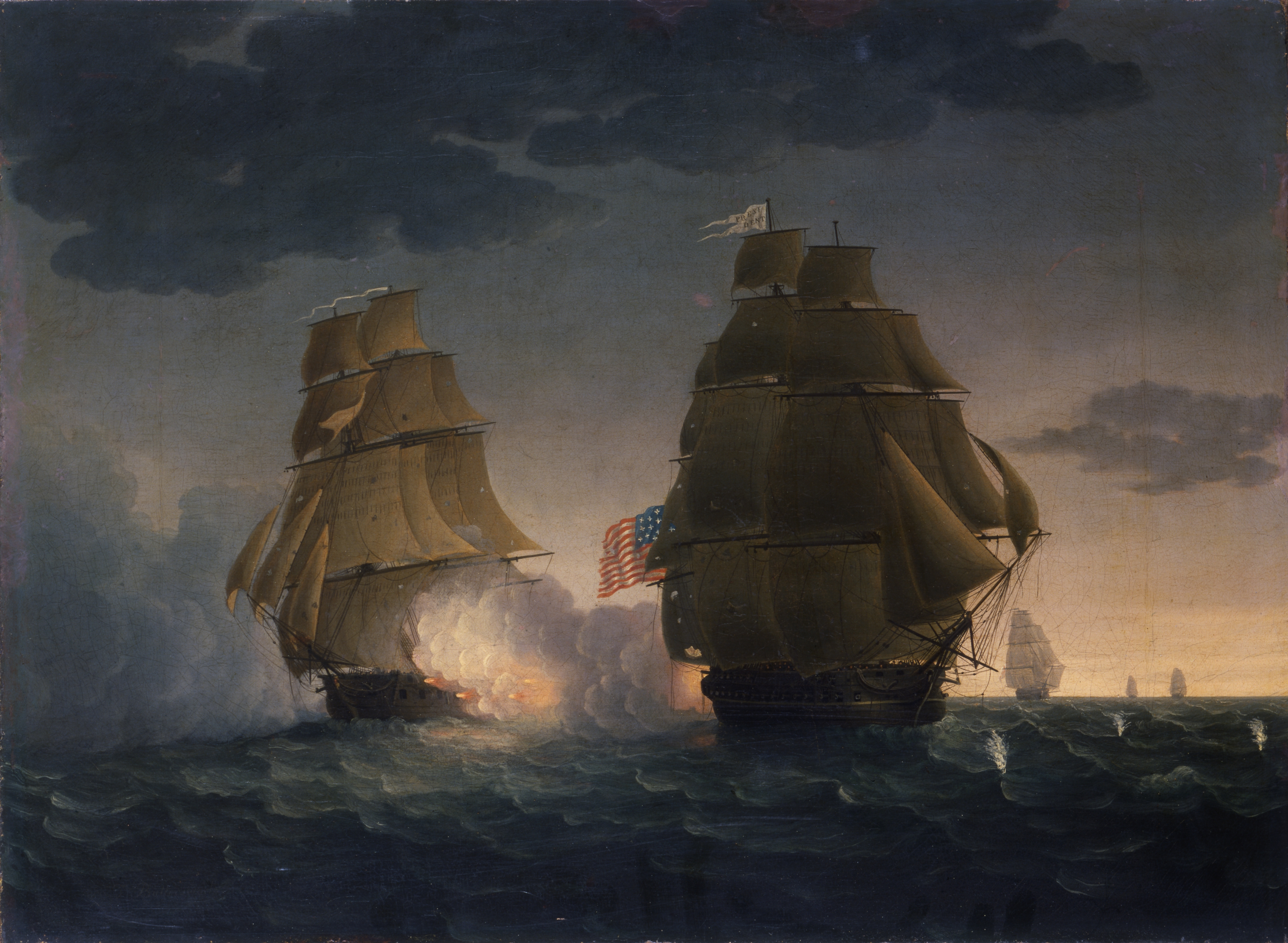
USS President (right foreground) engages HMS Endymion (left foreground) with her stern chaser

Located 1,030 kilometres (640 mi) off Cape Hatteras, North Carolina, 1,239 kilometres (770 mi) South of Cape Sable Island, Nova Scotia, and 1,770 kilometres (1,100 mi) North-East of Miami, Bermuda replaced the continental bases between Canada and the West Indies that the Royal Navy had been deprived of by American independence. During the War of 1812 the Royal Navy's blockade of the US Atlantic ports was coordinated from Bermuda and Halifax, Nova Scotia.

The blockade kept most of the American navy trapped in port. The Royal Navy also occupied coastal islands, encouraging American slaves to defect. Military-aged males were enlisted into a Corps of Colonial Marines while their families were sent to the dockyard in Bermuda for the duration of the war, employed by the Royal Navy. These marines fought for the Crown on the Atlantic Seaboard, and in the attack on Washington, D.C. and the Chesapeake.

After British victory in the Peninsular War, part of Wellington's Light Division was released for service in North America. This 2,500-man force, composed of detachments from the 4, 21, 44, and 85 Regiments with some elements of artillery and sappers and commanded by Major-General Robert Ross, arrived in Bermuda in 1814 aboard a fleet composed of the 74-gun HMS Royal Oak, three frigates, three sloops and ten other vessels. The combined force was to launch raids on the coastlines of Maryland and Virginia, with the aim of drawing US forces away from the Canada–US border. In response to American actions at Lake Erie (the Burning of York), however, Sir George Prevost requested a punitive expedition which would "deter the enemy from a repetition of such outrages". The British force arrived at the Patuxent on 17 August and landed the soldiers within 36 miles of Washington, D.C. Led by Rear Admiral Sir George Cockburn, the British force drove the US government out of Washington, D.C.. Ross shied from the idea of burning the public buildings in the city, but Cockburn and others set it alight. Buildings burned included the US Capitol and the US President's Mansion.

== Pax Britannica, 1815–1914 ==
After 1827 there were no major battles until 1914. The navy was used against shore installations, such as those in the Baltic and Black Sea during the Crimean War in 1854 and 1855. They were also used to fight pirates and to hunt down slave ships.

The navy assisted the army when sailors and marines were landed as naval brigades, as on many occasions between the siege of Sevastopol and the 1900 Boxer Rebellion. With a fleet larger than any two rivals combined, the British nation could take security for granted, but at all times the national leaders and public opinion supported a powerful navy, and service was of high prestige.

=== Operations ===
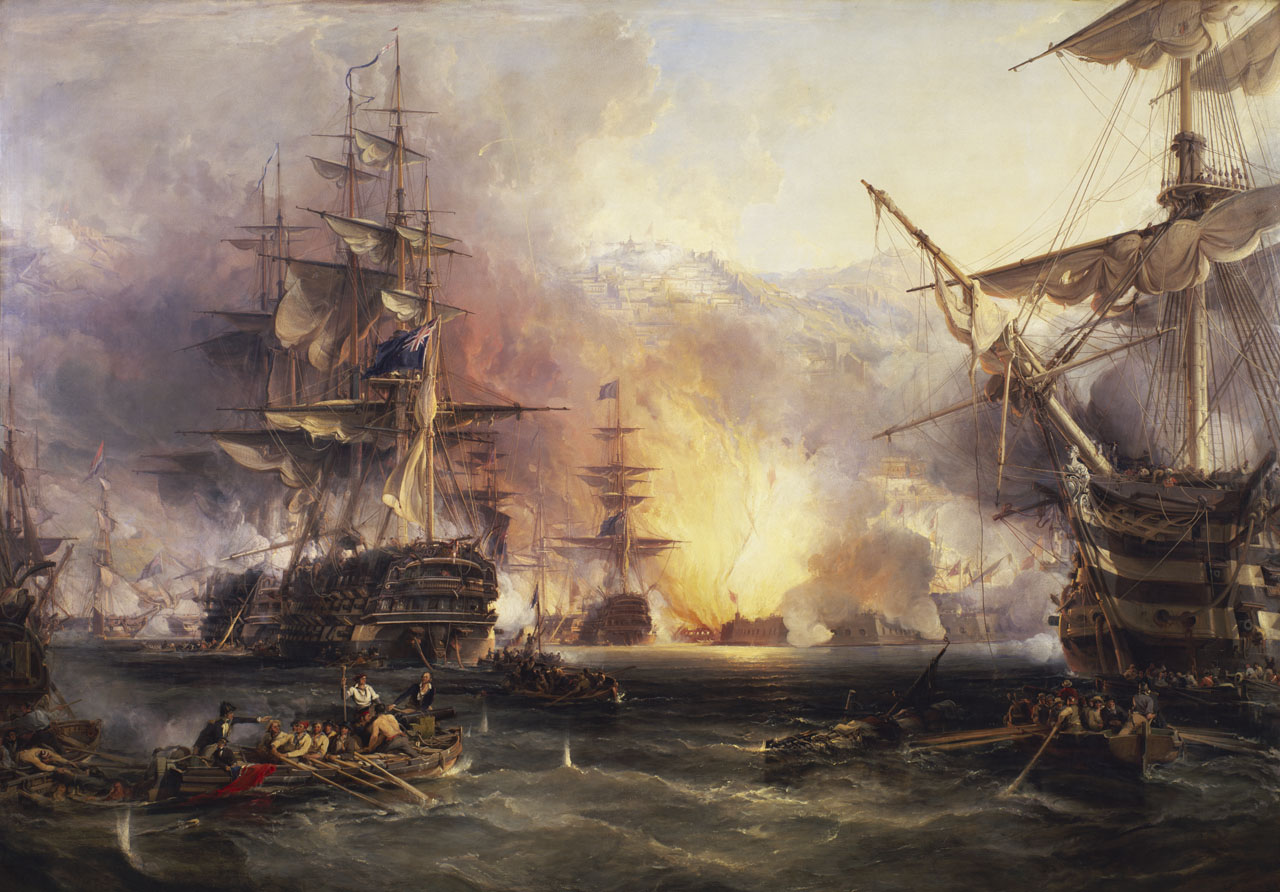
The bombardment of Algiers, 1816

The first action of the period was the 1816 bombardment of Algiers by a joint Anglo-Dutch fleet under Lord Exmouth, to force the Barbary state of Algiers to free Christian slaves and to halt the practice of enslaving Europeans. During the Greek War of Independence, at the Battle of Navarino in 1827, the Turkish fleet was destroyed by the combined fleets of Britain, France and Russia. This was the last major action between fleets of sailing ships. Ottoman involvement continued, with the bombardment of Acre in 1840, and additional Mediterranean crises during the rest of the decade.

To try to prevent Russia gaining access to a warm water port, the Crimean War was fought in the 1850s. Britain (in concert with the Ottoman Empire and the Second French Empire) sent 150 transports and 13 warships and the Imperial Russian Navy's Black Sea Fleet was destroyed. The Crimean War was a testing ground for the new technologies of steam and shell. It was shown that explosive shells ripped wooden hulls to pieces, which led to the development of the "iron clad" ship. It also showed the need for a permanent pool of trained seamen. There were two Anglo-French campaigns against Russia. In the Black Sea, success at Sevastopol was paralleled by successful operations in the Baltic including the bombardments of Bomarsund and Sveaborg.

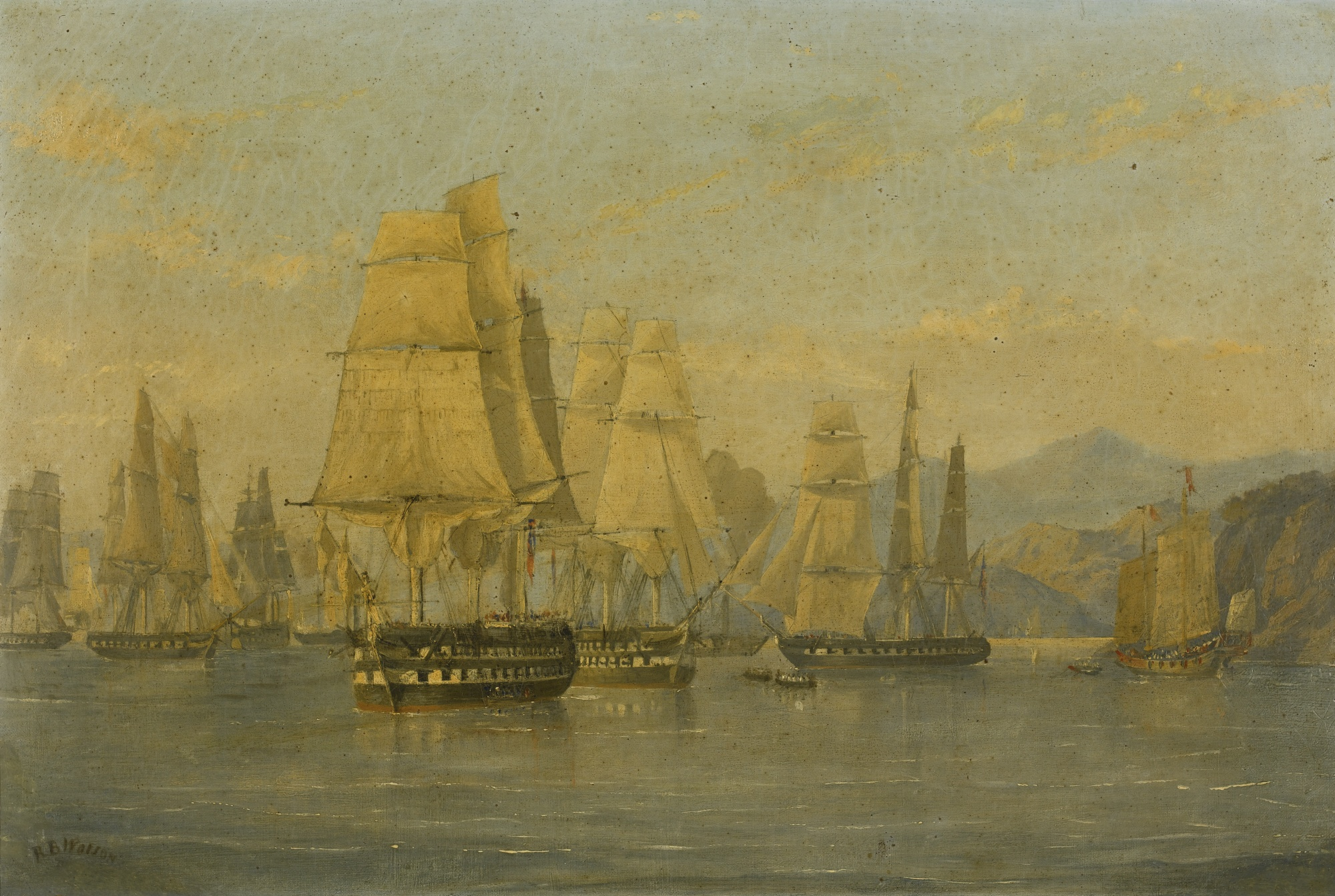
HMS Wellesley and the British squadron sailing from Hong Kong for the attack on Xiamen during the First Opium War, 1841

The Chinese government placed unilateral restraints on British trade with China. Acting under the Daoguang Emperor, 1839 the Chinese official Lin Zexu impounded opium from India, but the British insisted on the British Empire being allowed to export to China and instituted a blockade of Guangzhou, beginning the First Opium War. There was a Second Opium War from 1856 to 1860. In 1857, the British captured Canton and threatened Beijing. They were thrown back by the Chinese in 1859 but succeeded the following year. As a result of these actions Britain gained a base at Hong Kong in 1839 and a base in Canton in 1857.

In 1864, the bombardment of Kagoshima forced Japan to accept foreign traders. During the Russo-Turkish War the British sent a fleet of battleships under Admiral Geoffrey Hornby to intimidate Russia from entering Constantinople. Over the next thirty years, only a bombardment of Alexandria in 1882 brought the fleet into action, carried out to ensure control of the Suez Canal.

=== Technology ===
During this period, naval warfare underwent a comprehensive transformation, brought about by steam propulsion, metal ship construction, and explosive munitions. These changes marked the end of the Age of Sail and construction techniques that had dominated the preceding century. Despite having to completely replace its war fleet, the Navy managed to maintain its overwhelming advantage over all potential rivals. Due to British leadership in the Industrial Revolution, the country enjoyed unparalleled shipbuilding capacity and financial resources, which ensured that no rival could take advantage of these revolutionary changes to negate the British advantage in ship numbers.

Steam power was of interest to the Royal Navy from the beginning of the 19th century, since it neatly solved the difficult and dangerous sailing problems encountered in estuaries and other inshore areas. It was first adopted in HMS Comet, launched in 1822, and in 1824 HMS Lightning accompanied the expedition to Algiers. Steam vessels appeared in greater numbers through the 1830s and 1840s, all using side-mounted paddlewheels; screw propellers were introduced in the 1830s and, after some reluctance, were adopted in the mid-1840s (the famous tug-of-war between the screw-propelled HMS Rattler and the paddlewheeled Alecto (1839) was entertaining, but records show the Admiralty had already decided on and ordered screw ships). The first major steam warship was HMS Agamemnon. In the 1850s Naval Arms Race screw battleships and frigates, both conversions and new constructions, were built in large numbers. These ships retained a full capacity for sail as steam engines were not yet efficient enough to permit long ocean voyages under power. Steam power was intended only for use during battle and to allow ships to go to sea at will instead of being held in port by adverse winds. A triple expansion steam engine was introduced in 1881 which was more efficient than earlier ones. These changes were followed by the steam turbine, invented by Charles Parsons, demonstrated by the Turbinia in 1899.

Iron in ship construction was first used for diagonal-cross-bracing in major warships. The adoption of iron hulls for ocean-going ships had to wait until after Admiralty experiments had solved the problem of an iron-hull's effect on compass deviation. Because iron hulls were much thinner than wooden hulls, they appeared to be more vulnerable to damage when ships ran aground. Although Brunel had adopted iron in the Great Britain, the Admiralty was also concerned about the vulnerability of iron in combat, and experiments with iron in the 1840s seemed to indicate that iron would shatter under impact.

In 1858 France built the first seagoing ironclad, Gloire, and Britain responded with Warrior of 1860, the first of the 1860s Naval Arms Race—an intensive programme of construction that eclipsed French efforts by 1870. She was called a "Black Snake" by Napoleon III, but was soon superseded.

When armoured ships were first introduced, in-service guns had very little ability to penetrate their armour. However, starting in 1867, guns started to be introduced into service capable of penetrating the armour of the first generation iron-clads, albeit at favourable angles and at short range. This had already been anticipated, and armour thicknesses grew, resulting in turn in a gun calibre-race as larger guns gave better penetration. The explosive shell was introduced in 1820.

In parallel with this, there was a debate over how guns should be mounted on ship. Captain Cowper Coles had developed a gun turret design in the late 1850s as a result of experience in the Crimean War. Initial designs, published in Blackwood's Magazine in 1859, were for a ship with far more than 10 turrets. Consequently, a range of coastal-service turret-ships were built in parallel with the seagoing iron-clads. Because of agitation from Coles and his supporters, the issue of turret-ships became deeply political, and resulted in the ordering of Captain, an unsatisfactory private design by Lairds and Coles. The rival Admiralty design, Monarch, had a long and successful career. However the need to combine high-free-board at the bow with sails meant that both these ships had very poor end-on fire. The Admiralty's next seagoing mastless turret-ship design Devastation solved these problems by having very large coal bunkers, and put the 35-ton guns in turrets on a breastwork.

Tank testing of hull models was introduced and mechanical calculators as range finders. The torpedo came in during the 1870s and the first ship to fire one in battle was HMS Shah. This led to the development of torpedo boats and torpedo boat destroyers (later called just destroyers).

=== Palmerston Forts, 1860–1869 ===
During the 1860s, fear of a French invasion of Britain prompted a major programme of coastal fortifications. Over 70 forts were constructed by the end of the decade, many of which were in the vicinity of the naval base in Portsmouth and the surrounding waters. The mid 19th century saw such rapid technological development that some, such as Fort Brockhurst, were obsolete before construction had even finished. France was crippled by defeat in the 1870 Franco-Prussian War and Britain would not face a serious military threat until the World Wars, by which point they were long out of date. They received much ridicule in later years, and are sometimes referred to as "Palmerston's Follies".

=== Two-power standard ===
The age of naval dominance at low cost was ended by increased naval competition from old rivals, such as France and Russia. These challenges were reflected by the Naval Defence Act 1889, which received royal assent on 31 May 1889, to increase British naval strength and formally adopt the country's "two-power standard". The standard called for the Royal Navy to be as strong as the world's next two largest navies combined (at that point, France and Russia) by maintaining a number of battleships at least equal to their combined strength.

That led to a new ship building programme, which authorised ten new battleships, 38 cruisers, and additional vessels. The books by American Alfred Thayer Mahan and his visit to Europe in the 1890s heightened interest even more. When Prime Minister William Ewart Gladstone held out against another large programme of naval construction in 1894, he found himself alone, and so resigned.

Being unchallenged and unchallengable, Britain was able to exercise her maritime imperium of the Pax Britanica at remarkably modest expense. The British defence burden fell progressively to a minimum of 2 per cent (of GDP) in 1870. Britain's dominance flowed not so much from the size of her active fleets as from the vast potential strength implicit in the reserve fleet and, behind that, the unrivalled capacity of her industry.

At this time, 80% of merchant steamships were built in British shipyards. The rate of French construction was low, and construction times were stretched out. For instance, the last of the three French 1872-programme battleships was not completed until October 1886. Many of these long-delayed ships were completed in the second half of the 1880s, and this was misrepresented as the French having more new battleships than the Royal Navy in various publications including the famous 1884 articles in the Liberal magazine Pall Mall Gazette, which alarmed the public just before the General Election, and helped create an increased market for books on naval matters such as the Naval Annual, which was first published in 1887. Reforms were also gradually introduced in the conditions for enlisted men with the abolition of military flogging in 1879, amongst others.

The two-power standard was abandoned before the First World War, and after the war it was replaced by a "one-power standard", with the navy kept equal in size to the United States Navy.

=== Reforms and increasing tension, 1901–1914 ===
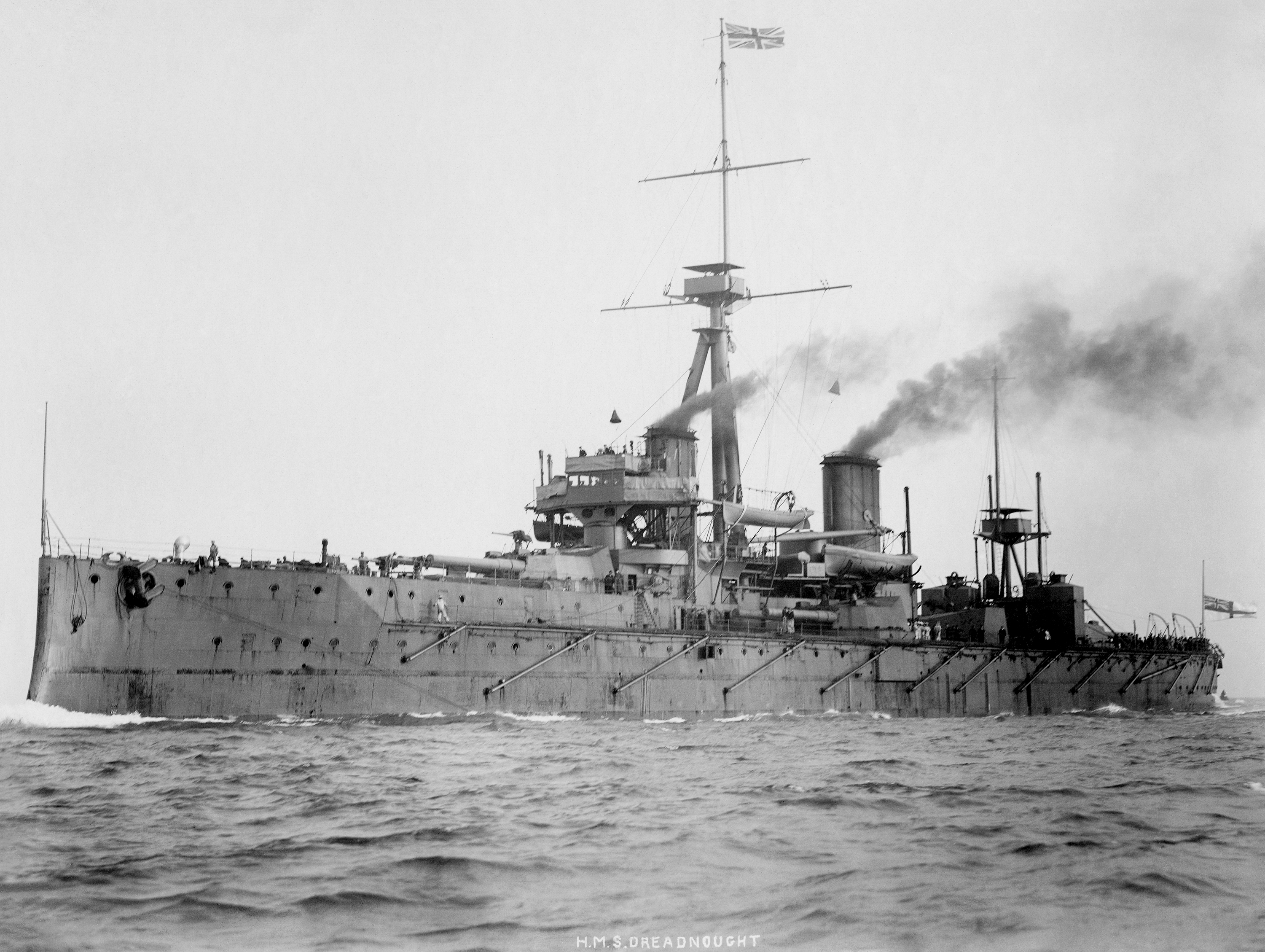
Dreadnought, 1906 photograph

Both naval construction and naval strategising became intense, prompted by the development of torpedoes and submarines (from 1901), which challenged traditional ideas about the power of battleships. At the same time the Dreadnought committed to the "big gun only" concept and caused a shift in thinking around the world. This ship had ten 12-inch guns with a top speed of 21.5 knots, a speed and firepower that rendered all existing battleship designs obsolete. The industrial and economic development of Germany had by this time overtaken Britain, enabling the Imperial German Navy to attempt to outpace British construction of dreadnoughts. In the ensuing arms race, Britain succeeded in maintaining a substantial numerical advantage over Germany, but for the first time since 1805 another navy now existed with the capacity to challenge the Royal Navy in battle.

The British were aided in this development by having naval observers aboard the Japanese fleet at the battle of Tsushima straits in 1905 where the Japanese decisively defeated the Russian fleet. Another innovative concept was the battlecruiser, as well armed as a battleship but faster. However, to achieve this the ship's armour was less compared to a battleship. The result was a potentially fatal weakness when fighting other capital ships.

The Royal Navy began developing submarines beginning on 4 February 1901. These submarines were ordered in late 1900 and were built by Vickers under a licensing agreement with the American Electric Boat Company. The first British Holland No. 1 (Type 7) submarine (assembled by Vickers) was 63 feet 4 inches long.

Major reforms of the British fleet were undertaken, particularly by Admiral Jackie Fisher as First Sea Lord from 1904 to 1909. During this period, 154 obsolete ships, including 17 battleships, were scrapped to make way for newer vessels. Reforms in training and gunnery were introduced to make good perceived deficiencies, which in part Tirpitz had counted upon to provide his ships with a margin of superiority. Changes in British foreign policy, such as the Great Rapprochement with the United States, the Anglo-Japanese Alliance, and the Entente Cordiale with France allowed the fleet to be concentrated in home waters. By 1906 the Royal Navy's only likely opponent was the Imperial German Navy.

In 1910, the Naval Intelligence Department (NID) was shorn of its responsibility for war planning and strategy when the outgoing Fisher created the Navy War Council as a stop-gap remedy to criticisms emanating from the Beresford Inquiry that the Navy needed a naval staff—a role the NID had been in fact fulfilling since at least 1900, if not earlier. After this reorganisation, war planning and strategic matters were transferred to the newly created Naval Mobilisation Department and the NID reverted to the position it held prior to 1887—an intelligence collection and collation organisation.

Some countries from within the British Empire started developing their own navies. In 1910 the Royal Australian Navy and the Royal Canadian Navy came into being; local defence forces that would however operate within an overall imperial strategy led by the RN. All these reforms and innovations of course required a large increase in funding. Between 1900 and 1913 the Naval Estimates nearly doubled to total £44,000,000.

== First World War, 1914–1918 ==
The accumulated tensions in international relations finally broke out into the hostilities of World War I. From the naval point of view, it was time for the massed fleets to prove themselves, but caution and manoeuvring resulted in few major engagements at sea. Although there was no decisive battle, the Royal Navy and the Kaiserliche Marine fought many small engagements: the Battle of Heligoland Bight, the Battle of Coronel, the Battle of the Falkland Islands, and the Battle of Dogger Bank. The one great confrontation came in 1916 with the Battle of Jutland. The British blockade and cut-off from international trade led to increasing public discontent and finally the German Revolution of 1918–19. The British fighting advantage proved insurmountable, leading the High Seas Fleet to abandon any attempt to challenge British dominance.

=== Blockade of Germany ===
The majority of the Royal Navy's strength was deployed at home in the Grand Fleet, in an effort to blockade Germany and to draw the Hochseeflotte (the German "High Seas Fleet") into an engagement where a decisive victory could be gained. The Navy's Northern Patrol and a mining program closed off access to the North Sea, while the Dover Patrol closed off access to the English Channel. As well as closing off the Imperial German Navy's access to the Atlantic, the blockade largely blocked neutral merchant shipping heading to or from Germany. The blockade was maintained during the eight months after the armistice was agreed to force Germany to end the war and sign the Treaty of Versailles.

=== Defending merchant shipping ===
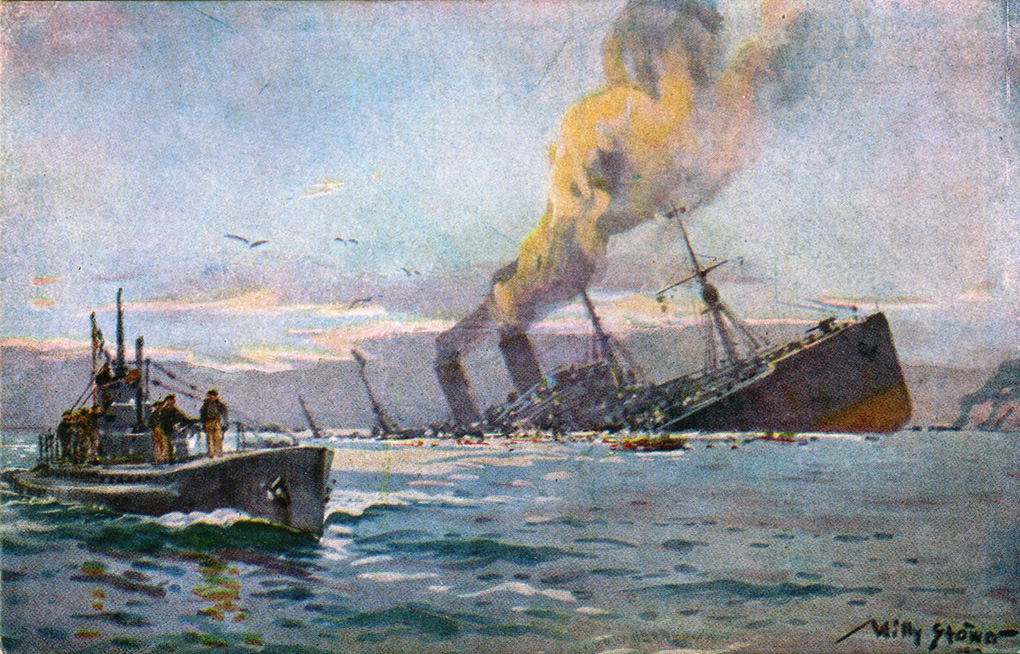
U-boat warfare, 1917

The most serious menace faced by the Navy came from the attacks on merchant shipping mounted by German U-boats. For much of the war this submarine campaign was restricted by prize rules requiring merchant ships to be warned and evacuated before sinking. In 1915 the Germans renounced these restrictions and began to sink merchant ships on sight but later returned to the previous rules of engagement to placate neutral opinion. A resumption of unrestricted submarine warfare in 1917 raised the prospect of Britain and its allies being starved into submission. The Navy's response to this new form of warfare had proved inadequate due to its refusal to adopt a convoy system for merchant shipping, despite the demonstrated effectiveness of the technique in protecting troopships. The belated introduction of convoys sharply reduced losses and brought the U-boat threat under control.

Energy was a critical factor for the British war effort. Most of the energy supplies came from coal mines in Britain. Critical however was the flow of oil for ships, lorries and industrial use. There were no oil wells in Britain so everything was imported. In 1917 total British consumption was 827 million barrels, of which 85% was supplied by the United States, and 6% by Mexico. Fuel oil for the Royal Navy was the highest priority. In 1917 the Royal Navy consumed 12,500 tons a month, but had a supply of 30,000 tons a month from the Anglo-Persian Oil Company, using their oil wells in Qajar Iran. The need for oil would also lead to the British colonisation of Iraq under a League of Nations mandate during the dissolution of the Ottoman Empire at the end of the war.

=== Other campaigns ===
At the start of the war the German Empire had armed cruisers scattered across the globe. The Royal Navy, along with the Royal Australian Navy, captured German colonies in the Pacific shortly after the outbreak of the war. This forced the German East Asia Squadron to abandon their base. With the wayward squadron now intending to attack shipping in the region, a small number of Royal Navy ships attempted to engage them at the Battle of Coronel, which resulted in significant British losses. The German East Asia Squadron was eventually defeated at the Battle of the Falkland Islands in December 1914.

The Royal Navy was also heavily committed in the Dardanelles Campaign against the Ottoman Empire. It suffered heavy losses during a failed attempt to break through the system of minefields and shore batteries defending the straits.

The Navy contributed the Royal Naval Division to the land forces of the New Army. The Royal Marines took part in many operations including the raid on Zeebrugge.

The Royal Naval Air Service was formed in 1914 but was mainly limited to reconnaissance. Converted ships were initially used to launch aircraft with landings in the sea. The first purpose-built aircraft carrier was HMS Argus, launched in 1918.

== Inter-war period, 1918–1939 ==
In 1921 the New Zealand Division of the Royal Navy were established as New Zealand force within the RN.

=== Disarmament and pay cuts, 1922–1935 ===
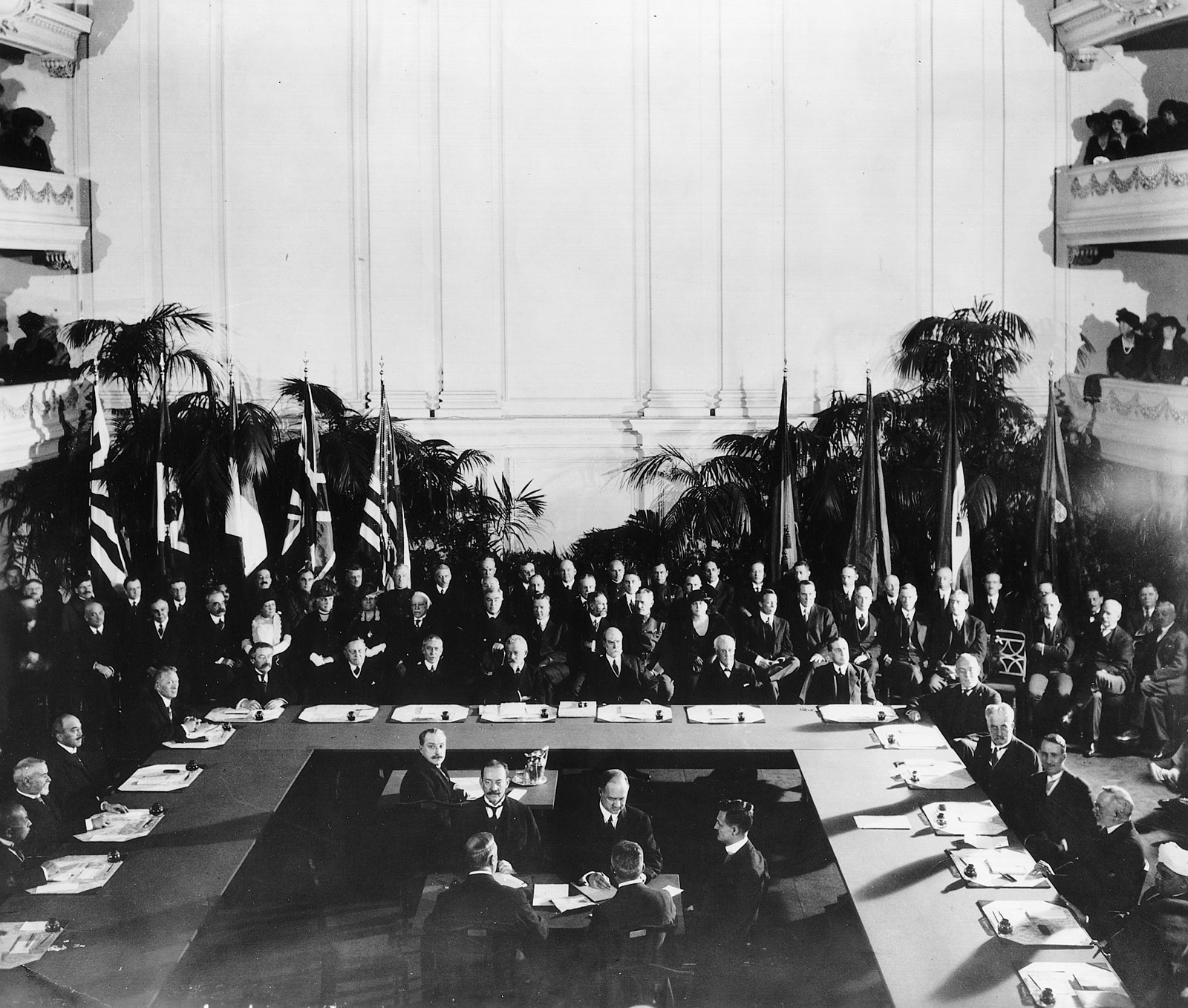
The signing of the Washington Naval Treaty, 1922

In the wake of the First World War, there was an international movement to begin disarmament. The Washington Naval Treaty of 1922 imposed limits on individual ship tonnage and gun calibre, as well as total tonnage of the navy. The treaty, together with the deplorable financial conditions during the immediate post-war period and the Great Depression, forced the Admiralty to scrap all capital ships with a gun calibre under 13.5 inches and to cancel plans for new construction. Three of the Admiral-class battlecruisers had already been cancelled by the time the treaty was signed. The G3-class of 16-inch battlecruisers and the N3-class battleship of 18-inch battleships were cancelled. Also under the treaty, three "large light cruisers"—Glorious, Courageous and Furious—were converted to aircraft carriers. New additions to the fleet were therefore minimal during the 1920s, the only major new vessels being two Nelson-class battleships and fifteen County-class cruisers and York-class heavy cruisers. This was followed by the 1930 London Naval Treaty which deferred new capital ship construction until 1937 and reiterated construction limits on cruisers, destroyers and submarines.

There were significant pay cuts in the 1920s, amounting to 25% for some. This culminated in the Invergordon Mutiny of 1931, with crews of various warships refused to sail on exercises, which caused great shock. This led to changes with the pay cuts reduced to 10%, though around 200 sailors were jailed in the aftermath.

=== One-power standard ===
Faced with the expansion of the United States Navy, by 1922 the British navy adopted the "one-power standard", which saw the Royal Navy required to match the United States Navy in size. This change has sometimes been connected with the Washington Naval Treaty in 1922, however this is incorrect as the treaty limited maximum fleet scale, not minimum fleet scale. British naval supremacy was lost in 1943, when the United States Navy overtook the Royal Navy in size amid the Second World War.

=== Tensions and arms race, 1937–1939 ===
As international tensions increased in the mid-1930s the Second London Naval Treaty of 1935 failed to halt the development of a naval arms race and by 1938 treaty limits were effectively ignored. The re-armament of the Royal Navy was well under way by this point, with construction underway on the still treaty-affected new battleships and its first full-sized purpose-built aircraft carriers. In addition to new construction, several existing old battleships, battlecruisers and heavy cruisers were reconstructed, and anti-aircraft weaponry reinforced, while new technologies, such as ASDIC, Huff-Duff and hydrophones, were developed. The Navy had lost control of naval aviation when the Royal Naval Air Service was merged with the Royal Flying Corps to form the Royal Air Force in 1918, but regained control of ship-board aircraft with the return of the Fleet Air Arm to Naval control in 1937.

The Navy made a show of force against Mussolini's war in Abyssinia, and operated in China to evacuate British citizens from cities under Japanese attack during the Second Sino-Japanese War.

== Second World War, 1939–1945 ==
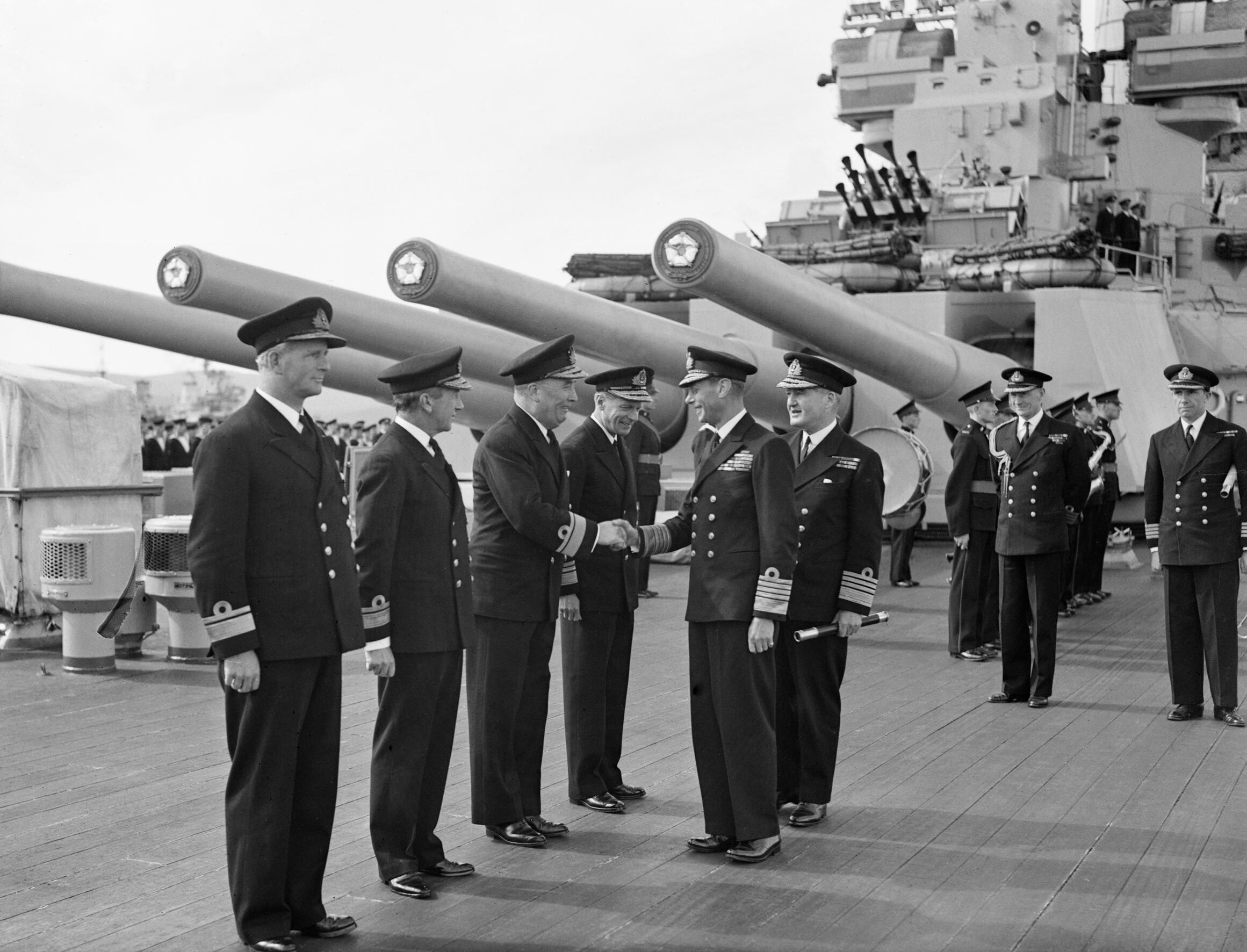
King George VI and Admiral Bruce Fraser aboard HMS Duke of York at Scapa Flow, August 1943

At the start of the war in 1939, the Royal Navy was the largest in the world, with over 1,400 vessels.

- 7 aircraft carriers – with 5 more under construction
- 15 battleships and battlecruisers – with 5 more under construction
- 66 cruisers – with 23 more under construction
- 184 destroyers – with 52 under construction
- 45 escort and patrol vessels – with 9 under construction and one on order
- 60 submarines – with 9 under construction

The Royal Navy suffered heavy losses in the first two years of the war, including the carriers HMS Courageous, Glorious and Ark Royal, the battleships Royal Oak and Barham and the battlecruiser Hood in the European Theatre, and the carrier Hermes, the battleship Prince of Wales, the battlecruiser Repulse and the heavy cruisers Exeter, Dorsetshire and Cornwall in the Asian Theatre. Of the 1,418 men on the Hood, only three survived its sinking. Over 3,000 people were lost when the converted troopship RMS Lancastria was sunk in June 1940, the greatest maritime disaster in Britain's history. There were however also successes against enemy surface ships, as in the battles of the River Plate in 1939, Narvik in 1940 and Cape Matapan in 1941, and the sinking of the German capital ships Bismarck in 1941 and Scharnhorst in 1943.

The defence of the ports and harbours and keeping sea-lanes around the coast open was the responsibility of Coastal Forces and the Royal Naval Patrol Service.

=== Battle of the Atlantic, 1939–1945 ===
The Navy's most critical struggle was the Battle of the Atlantic defending Britain's vital commercial supply lines against U-boat attack. A traditional convoy system was instituted from the start of the war, but German submarine tactics, based on group attacks by "wolf-packs", were much more effective than in the previous war, and the threat remained serious for well over three years. Defences were strengthened by deployment of purpose-built escorts, of escort carriers, of long-range patrol aircraft, improved anti-submarine weapons and sensors, and by the deciphering of German Enigma signals by the code-breakers of Bletchley Park. The threat was at last effectively broken by devastating losses inflicted on the U-boats in the spring of 1943. Intense convoy battles of a different sort, against combined air, surface and submarine threats, were fought off enemy-controlled coasts in the Arctic, where Britain ran supply convoys through to Russia, and in the Mediterranean, where the struggle focused on Convoys to Malta.

=== Operation Dynamo, 1940 ===
During one of the earliest phases of the War the Royal Navy provided critical cover during Operation Dynamo, the British evacuations from Dunkirk, and as the ultimate deterrent to a German invasion of Britain during the following four months. At Taranto, Admiral Cunningham commanded a fleet that launched the first all-aircraft naval attack in history. Cunningham was determined that the Navy be perceived as the United Kingdom's most daring military force: when warned of risks to his vessels during the Allied evacuation after the Battle of Crete he said, "It takes the Navy three years to build a new ship. It will take three hundred years to build a new tradition. The evacuation will continue."

=== Amphibious operations ===
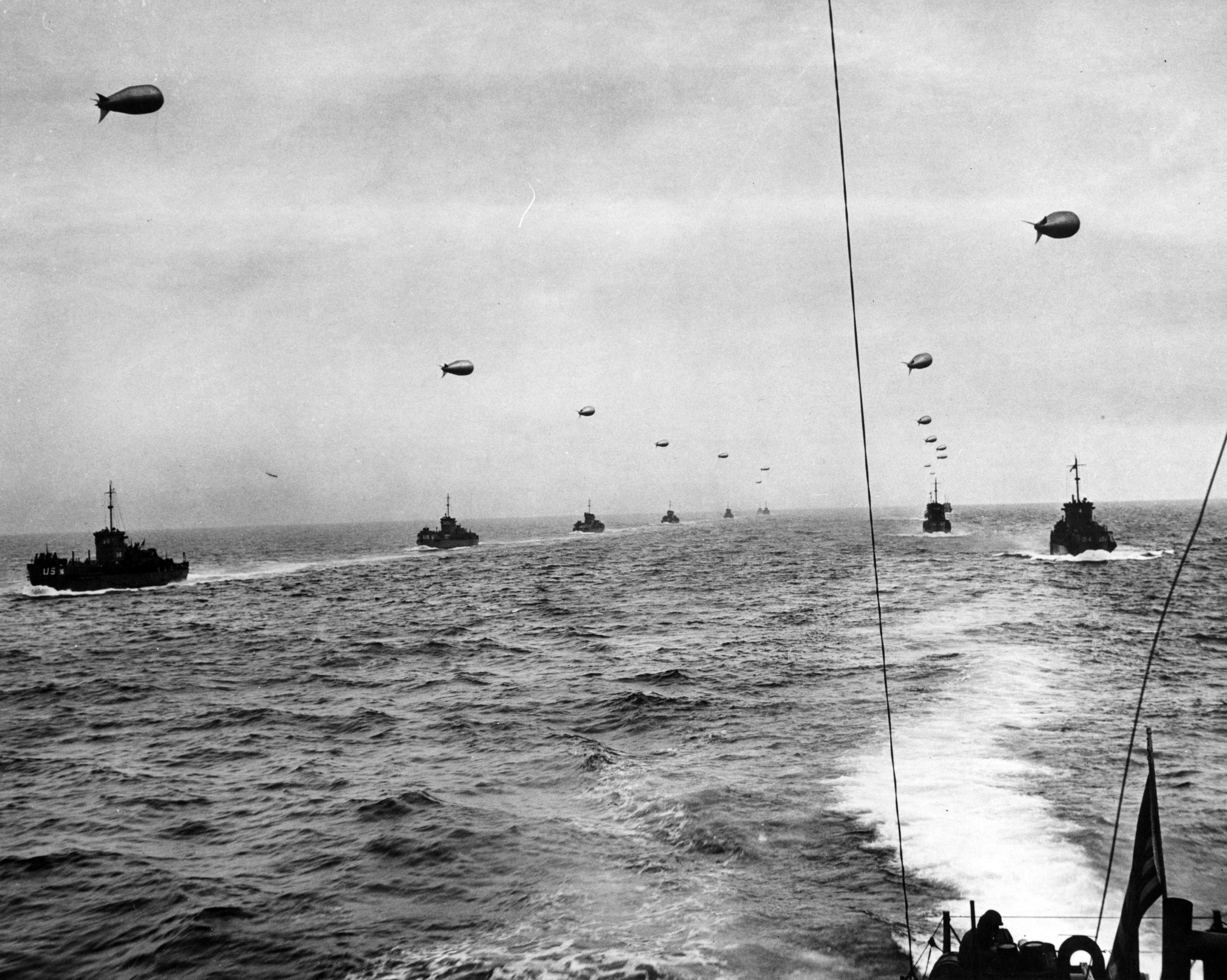
Landing craft convoy crossing the English Channel in 1944

Naval supremacy was vital to the amphibious operations carried out, such as the invasions of Northwest Africa, Sicily, Italy, and Normandy. The use of the Mulberry harbours allowed the invasion forces to be kept resupplied. The successful invasion of Europe reduced the European role of the navy to escorting convoys and providing fire support for troops near the coast as at Walcheren, during the battle of the Scheldt.

=== Operations against Japan ===
The British Eastern Fleet had been withdrawn to East Africa because of Japanese incursions into the Indian Ocean. Despite opposition from the U.S. Fleet Commander-in-Chief Admiral Ernest King, the Royal Navy sent a large task force to the Pacific (British Pacific Fleet). This required the use of wholly different techniques, requiring a substantial fleet support train, resupply at sea and an emphasis on naval air power and defence. Their largest attack was as part of Operation Meridian, striking oil refineries in Sumatra to deny Japanese access to supplies. The fleet supported allied forces during the Battle of Okinawa.

Had Japan not surrendered, the Royal Navy would have been part of Operation Downfall in 1946. The planned invasion and occupation of Kyushu would have been the largest amphibious landing ever conducted. The Royal Navy would have committed 18 aircraft carriers and 4 battleships to the action.

=== End of the war, and loss of naval supremacy ===
By the end of the war the Royal Navy comprised over 4,800 ships. However, it had lost its position as the largest or equal largest navy in the world to the United States Navy in 1943. The Royal Navy had become the second-largest fleet in the world, losing a supremacy that had been maintained for over a century.

== Cold War era, 1945–1991 ==
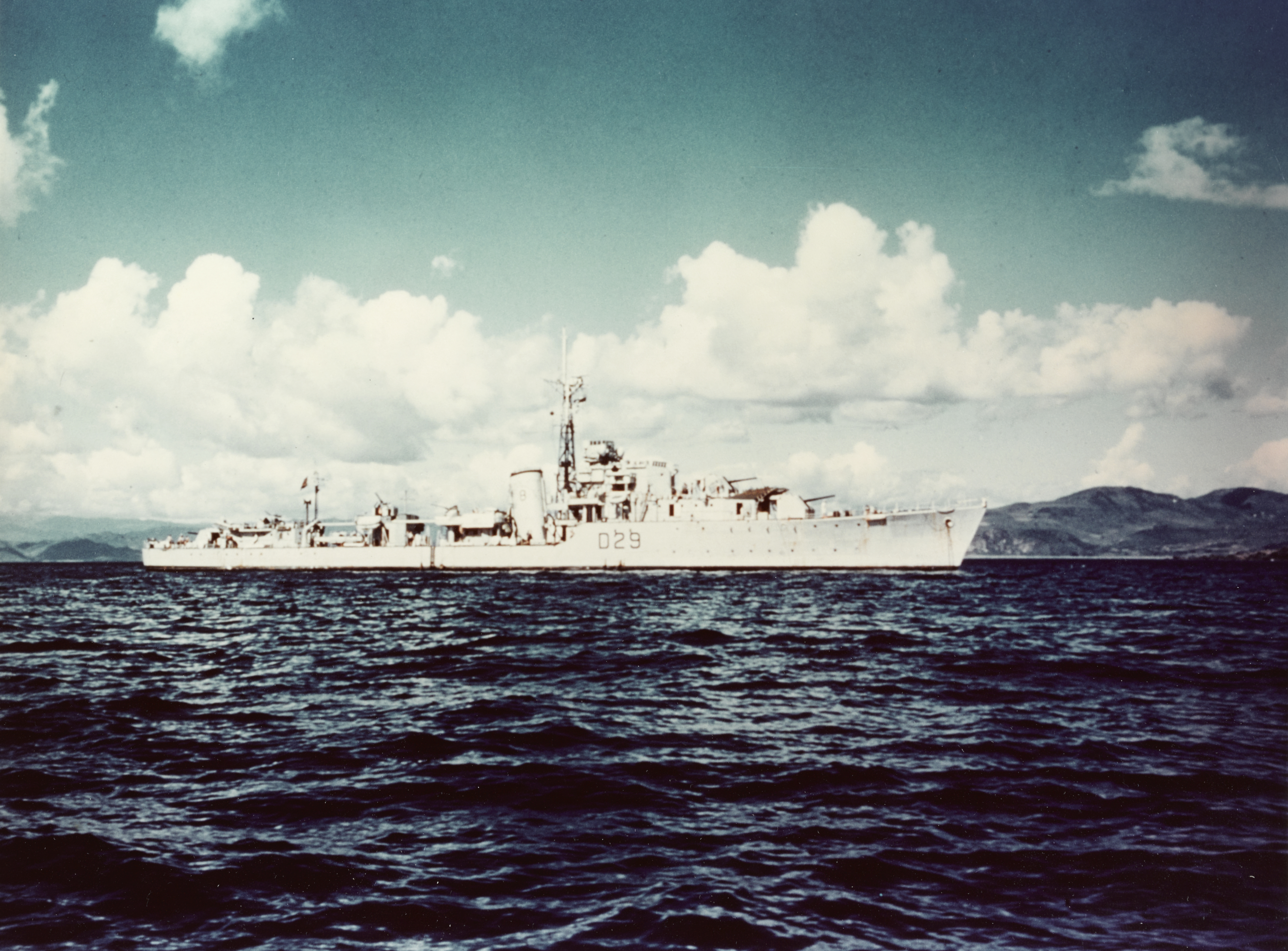
HMS Charity (R29) off Korea in 1952

After the Second World War, the decline of the British Empire and the economic hardships in Britain forced the reduction in the size and capability of the Royal Navy. All of the pre-war ships (except for the Town-class light cruisers) were quickly retired and most sold for scrapping over the years 1945–48, and only the best condition ships (the four surviving King George V-class battleships, carriers, cruisers, and some destroyers) were retained and refitted for service. The increasingly powerful United States Navy took on the former role of the Royal Navy as global naval power and police force of the sea. The combination of the threat of the Soviet Union, and Britain's commitments throughout the world, created a new role for the Navy. Governments since the Second World War have had to balance commitments with increasing budgetary pressures, partly due to the increasing cost of weapons systems, what historian Paul Kennedy called the Upward Spiral.

Battleships were quickly disposed of, as they were very expensive to operate and maintain, but their only conceivable role after 1945 was shore bombardment. HMS Vanguard (1946) was the last battleship constructed by any nation, and nicknamed "Britain’s Mightiest Mothball", as she saw only limited use, often for non-military purposes. A badminton court was constructed on the deck in 1947, for use by the royal family during her time as a royal yacht. It was the last British battleship when it was decommissioned in 1960. Rear-Admiral John Grant commented at the time that "The battleship is out of date and has now been replaced as a capital ship of the fleet by the aircraft carrier".

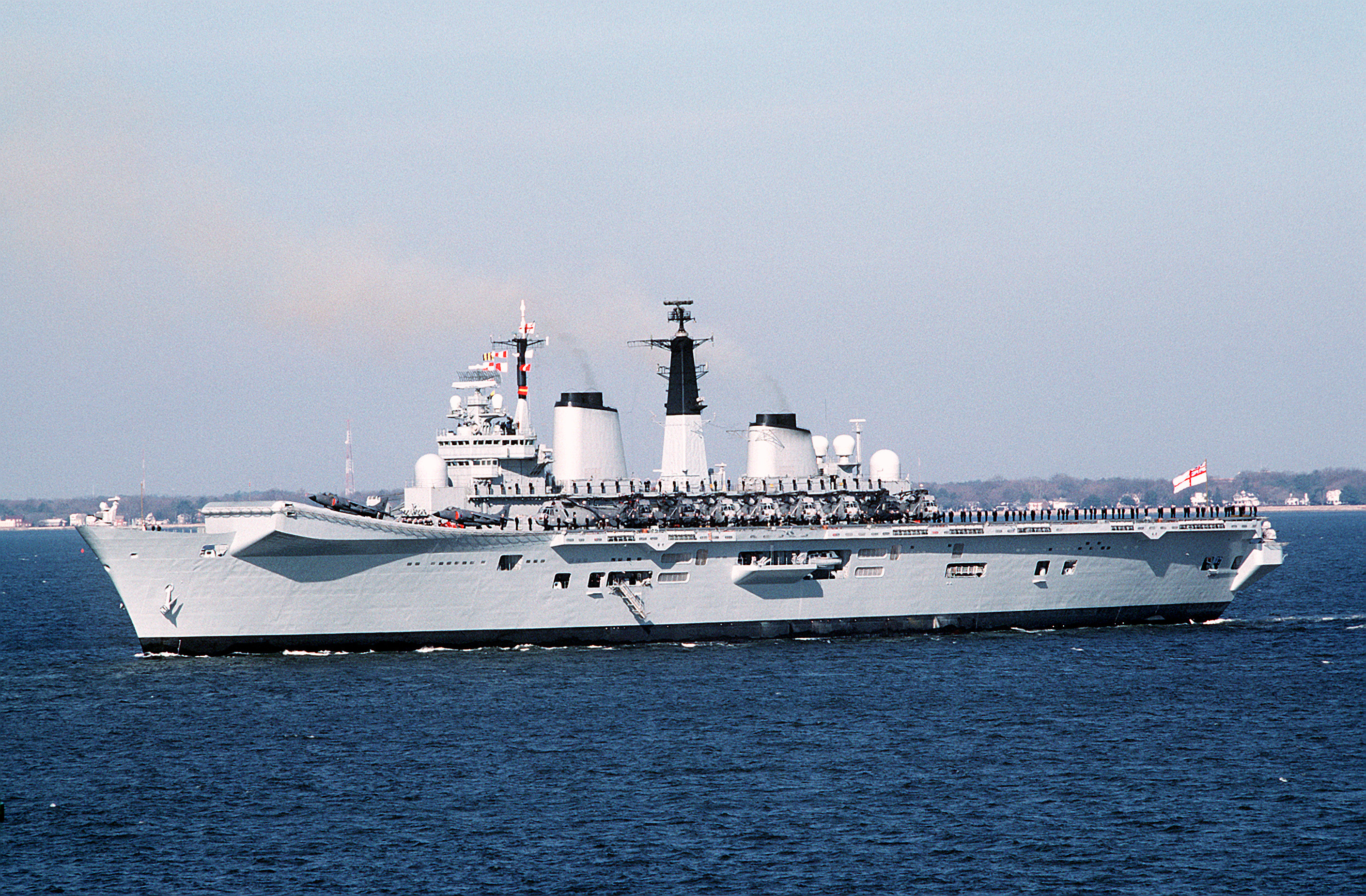
HMS Invincible, an Invincible-class aircraft carrier

A modest new construction programme was initiated with some new carriers (Majestic- and Centaur-class light carriers, and Audacious-class large carriers being completed between 1948 through 1958), along with three Tiger-class cruisers (completed 1959–61), the Daring-class destroyers in the 1950s, and finally the County-class guided missile destroyers completed in the 1960s.

The Navy began plans to replace its fleet of aircraft carriers in the mid-1960s. A plan was drawn up for three large aircraft carriers, each displacing about 60,000 tons; the plan was designated CVA-01. These carriers would be able to operate the latest aircraft coming into service and keep the Royal Navy's place as a major naval power. Harold Wilson's new Labour government that came to power in the 1964 general election was determined to cut defence expenditure as a means to reduce public spending, and in the 1966 Defence White Paper the project was cancelled. The existing carriers (all built during, or just after World War II) were refitted, two (Bulwark and Albion) becoming commando carriers, and four (Victorious, Eagle, and Ark Royal) being completed or rebuilt. Starting in 1965 with Centaur, one by one these carriers were decommissioned without replacement, culminating with the 1979 retirement of Ark Royal. By the early 1980s, only Hermes survived and received a refit (just in time for the Falklands War), to operate Sea Harriers. She operated along with three much smaller Invincible-class aircraft carriers, and the fleet was now centred around anti-submarine warfare in the north Atlantic as opposed to its former position with worldwide strike capability. Along with the war era carriers, all of the war built cruisers and destroyers, along with the post-war built Tiger-class cruisers and large County-class guided-missile destroyers were either retired or sold by 1984.

=== Korean War, 1950–1953 ===
The Royal Navy served in the Korean War as part of the British Commonwealth Forces Korea (BCFK), which also included forces from other Commonwealth nations such as Australia. Britain, like its allies, supported South Korea against invasion from the North. The most significant naval engagement, the Battle of Chumonchin Chan, took place on 2 July 1950, when four Korean People's Navy torpedo boats engaged a fleet of UN Command ships, including HMS Jamaica and HMS Black Swan. All four North Korean vessels were sunk in ten minutes, and were never able to launch any torpedoes. The engagement would deter North Korea from further conflict with UN warships, though they continued to make use of coastal bombardment, with Jamaica struck by a shell on 8 July. While the ship survived, four artillerymen were killed and became the first British casualties in the war.

The war did not see any further large engagements between ships, though there were engagements between minesweepers and other smaller ships. Navy carriers would continue to provide support for Supermarine Seafires, Fairey Fireflies and Hawker Sea Furies.

=== Suez Crisis, 1956 ===
British-Egyptian relations had soured considerably since the Egyptian revolution of 1952. The Egyptian government had signed arms treaties with Warsaw Pact states and increasingly moved against British goals in the region- and prime minister Anthony Eden privately wished to depose President Gamal Abdel Nasser. When the Egyptian government nationalised the Suez Canal, threatening Western access to a strategically important waterway, Egypt was invaded by Israel on 29 October.

Anglo-French forces had begun gathering in the Mediterranean that August. In terms of Royal Navy assets, this included an aircraft carrier task group, cruisers, destroyers, frigates, minesweepers and an amphibious warfare squadron. The action began with a week long air assault, and when it became clear that paratroopers landing in Operation Telescope would be unable to occupy Port Said on their own, this was followed by a naval attack on 6 November. Following in behind their minesweepers, the fleet advanced on the Egyptian coast- this allowed them to avoid Russian mines which had been set in their path. The navy supported a successful amphibious landing, but the force failed to cripple the Egyptian army, which had simply re-positioned back into the dense streets.

While the operation had broadly met its military objectives, Britain and France faced an extreme negative response internationally, even from allies including the United States and Canada. The fact that the United States had refused to support the endeavour – not wishing to compromise wider Arab relations – exposed the weakness of Britain and France after their retreat. Britain in particular had lost its status as superpower, and it accelerated the process of decolonisation. Most of the British Empire was broken up within a decade.

=== Cod Wars, 1958–1976 ===
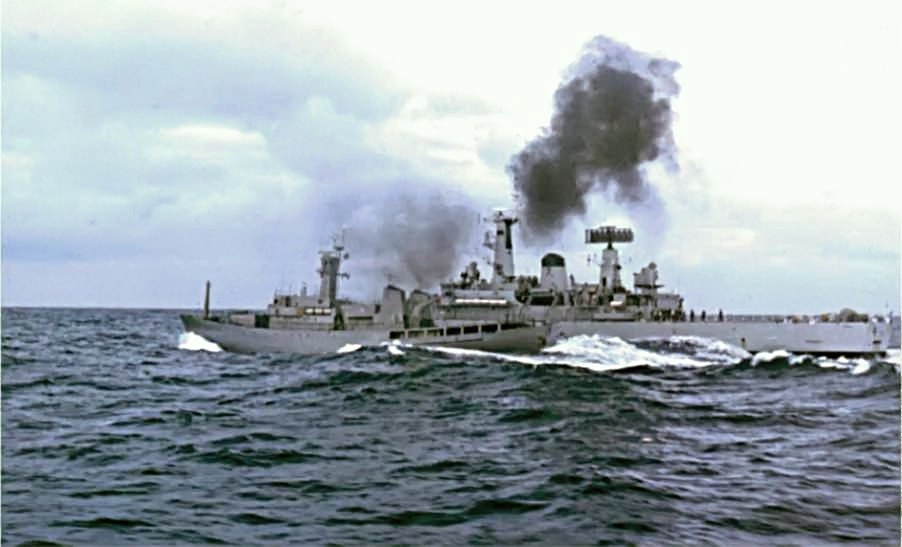
The collision of HMS Scylla and Odinn

The Royal Navy was involved in three confrontations with the Icelandic Coast Guard from 1958 to 1976. These largely bloodless incidents became known as the Cod Wars, and were part of a dispute relating to fishing waters. Royal Navy ships were involved in attempts to cut the nets of Icelandic trawlers, and later equipped with ramming equipment to intentionally strike Icelandic ships. After Iceland ended diplomatic relations with the United Kingdom and threatened to withdraw from NATO, a peace settlement was reached. The conflict resulted in British recognition of an Icelandic economic zone over a large area of water. As the area in question was a prime fishing ground, the exclusive Icelandic access resulted in thousands of British job losses.

=== Polaris programme, 1962–1996 ===
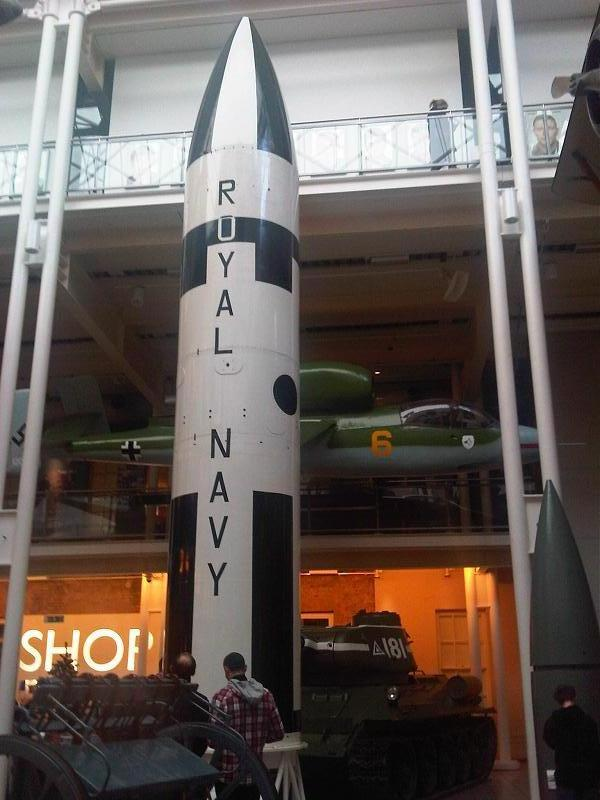
Royal Navy Polaris missile, at the Imperial War Museum

In 1962 a new Dreadnought became Britain's first nuclear-powered submarine. The following year, the Polaris Sales Agreement allowed Britain to purchase the Polaris missile from the United States, for the purpose of submarine based nuclear deterrent. The highly favourable terms came at a surprise to the British, and it represented a warming of relations which had been troubled in the immediate aftermath of the Suez crisis. In 1968 the first ballistic missile submarine Resolution was commissioned, armed with the new missiles. The Royal Navy later became wholly responsible for the maintenance of the UK's nuclear deterrent. Even so, the Labour government had announced in 1966 that Britain would not mount major operations without the help of allies, and that the existing carrier force would be maintained into the 1970s. Christopher Mayhew and Sir David Luce resigned in protest, but to no avail. Britain withdrew from the east of Suez, cancelling its planned CVA-01 large carrier, and other than Polaris focused on its NATO responsibilities of anti-submarine warfare, defending US Navy carrier groups in the GIUK gap. Polaris-armed submarines patrolled the North Atlantic from 1968 to 1996. The Polaris program was eventually abolished in favour of the newer Trident system.

=== Beira Patrol, 1966–1975 ===
With UN support, Britain applied sanctions on Rhodesia (now Zimbabwe) after it unilaterally declared independence without meeting preconditions including adopting racial equality. After Rhodesia sought to circumvent an oil embargo by importing oil through the port of Beira in Portuguese Mozambique, the Royal Navy began a nine year blockade of the port- though they could not approach closer than the 6 nautical mile territorial limit. Navy personnel boarded and questioned oil tankers arriving in the port, and after United Nations Security Council Resolution 221, were authorised to use force against non compliant tankers. Approximately 80 Royal Navy ships were involved in the blockade at various points, including the aircraft carrier Ark Royal, though the operation was scaled back after the independence of Madagascar in 1971 to only two ships, and the operation ended after Mozambique gained independence in 1975.

The patrol was a costly endeavour that was difficult to organise from a legal and political perspective, and failed to achieve its goals. It has been described as a "cautionary tale".

=== Falklands War, 1982 ===
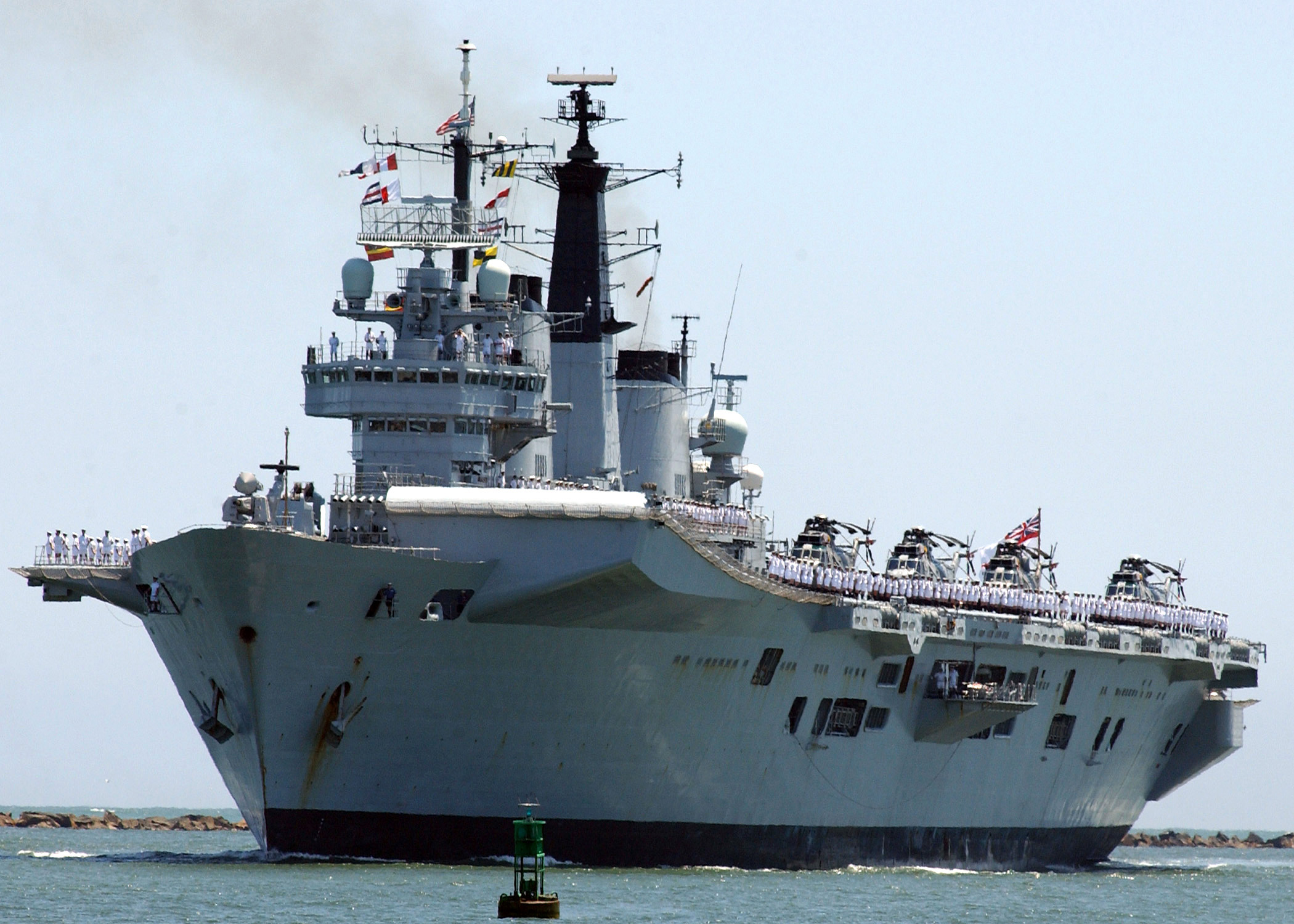
HMS Invincible, one of the Royal Navy's ships during the Falklands War

The most important operation conducted predominantly by the Royal Navy after the Second World War was the defeat in 1982 of Argentina in the Falkland War. Only four days after the invasion on 2 April, a Task Force sailed for the South Atlantic, with other warships and support ships following. On 25 April the navy retook South Georgia, crippling an Argentine Navy submarine called the Santa Fė. Despite losing four naval ships and other civilian and RFA ships the Royal Navy proved it was still able to fight a battle 8,345 miles (12,800 km) from Great Britain. HMS Conqueror is the only nuclear-powered submarine to have engaged an enemy ship with torpedoes, sinking the Argentine cruiser ARA General Belgrano.

=== Operations after 1982 ===
Between 1954 and 1971 the Royal Navy's geographical commands were merged into fewer but larger commands.

In the Home and Mediterranean Fleets after 1951, flotillas became headquarters supervising multiple squadrons, to conform with American practice. The squadrons of the Home Fleet were grouped under a Flag Officer, Flotillas, Home Fleet becoming the main seagoing flag officer. A similar arrangement applied to the Flag Officer, Flotillas, Mediterranean Fleet. The Flag Officer 5th Cruiser Squadron became Flag Officer Second in Command Far East Fleet with similar seagoing duties. Increasingly the term 'Submarine Flotilla' was used to describe the squadrons under command of the Flag Officer, Submarines. In 1967 the Home and Mediterranean Fleets were merged to form the Western Fleet.

By the end of 1969 the posts of Commanders-in-Chief at Portsmouth and Plymouth were unified into a single office of the Commander-in-Chief, Naval Home Command (CINCNAVHOME). The office was originally held by a four star admiral responsible for ashore support in the United Kingdom.

In November 1971, further reductions resulted in the Western Fleet being amalgamated with the Far East Fleet, resulting in a single operational Commander-in-Chief, Commander-in-Chief Fleet (CINCFLEET). He was a member of both the Admiralty and Navy Boards. This command was held by a four star admiral were based at Northwood Headquarters, in Middlesex, on the outskirts of London. Between 1971 and the 1990s the Admiral supervised five flag officers: Flag Officer, Carriers and Amphibious Ships; Flag Officer, First Flotilla; Flag Officer, Second Flotilla, the submarines, and Flag Officer, Third Flotilla. In 1992 Fleet Headquarters moved to Portsmouth.

Between 1990 and 1992 the system was changed. The Third Flotilla was abolished and the remaining two flotillas were re-designated. The Surface Flotilla under the Flag Officer, Surface Flotilla (FOSF) became responsible for operational readiness and training. The other officer, Commander United Kingdom Task Group (COMUKTG), would command any larger specially deployed naval force.

From 2004 CINCFLEET was based at HMS Excellent at Portsmouth. In April 2012 CINCFLEET and CINCNAVHOME were downgraded from full Admirals to Vice-Admirals and their roles redesignated. The new titles were Fleet Commander and Deputy Chief of the Naval Staff.

In the latter stages of the Cold War, the Royal Navy was reconfigured with three anti-submarine warfare (ASW) aircraft carriers and a force of frigates and destroyers. Its purpose was to search for and destroy Soviet submarines in the North Atlantic. There were also mine countermeasures and submarine forces as well as support ships. As the Cold War ended, the Royal Navy fought in the Gulf War against Iraq, with Sea Skua anti-ship missiles sinking a large proportion of the Iraqi Navy.

== Since 1991 ==
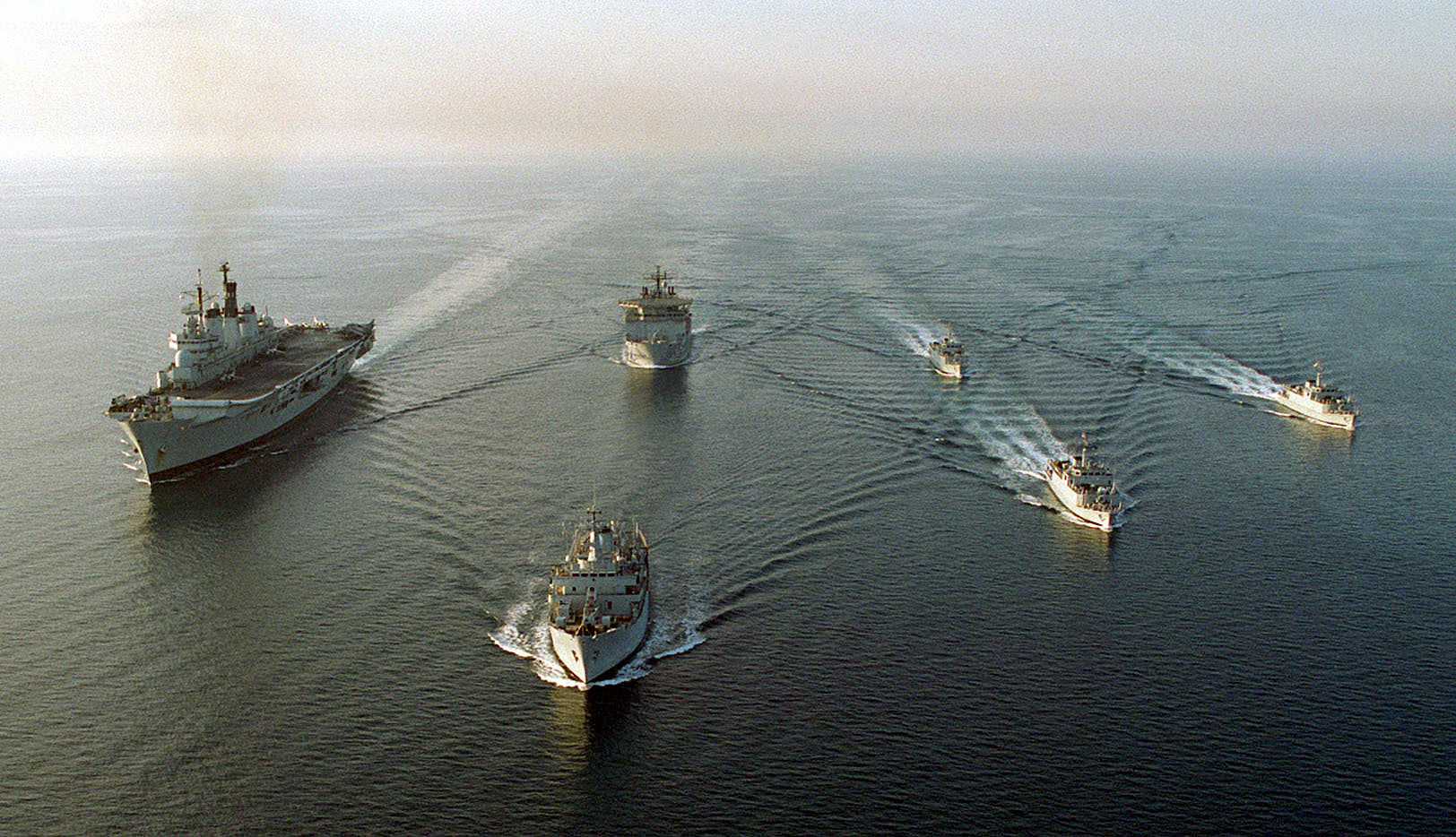
Royal Navy ships in the Persian Gulf during 1998

With the end of the Cold War, and the end of the Soviet submarine threat, the objectives and purpose of the Royal navy changed significantly. Major cutbacks were made over the following decades, with around half of the submarine fleet disposed of by 1995. The WRNS was amalgamated with the RN in 1993. The Strategic Defence Review of 1998 further reduced the size of the surface fleet.

The British military intervention in the Sierra Leone Civil War highlighted several oversights in naval policy at the time, including a need for Britain to project power outside the Middle East. This led to the 2003 Delivering Security in a Changing World white paper, which promised a somewhat brighter long-term future for the Navy, putting in place the largest naval procurement programme since the end of the Second World War in order to enhance and rebuild the fleet, with a view to bringing the Navy's capabilities into the 21st century, and restructuring the fleet from a North Atlantic-based, large anti-submarine force into a true blue water navy once more. Whilst several smaller vessels were to be withdrawn from service, it was confirmed that two new large aircraft carriers would be constructed. New and more capable ships were built; notably the Sheffield-class destroyers, the Type 21, Type 22, and Type 23 frigates, new LPDs of the Albion class, and HMS Ocean, but never in the numbers of the ships that they replaced. As a result, the Royal Navy surface fleet continues to reduce in size.

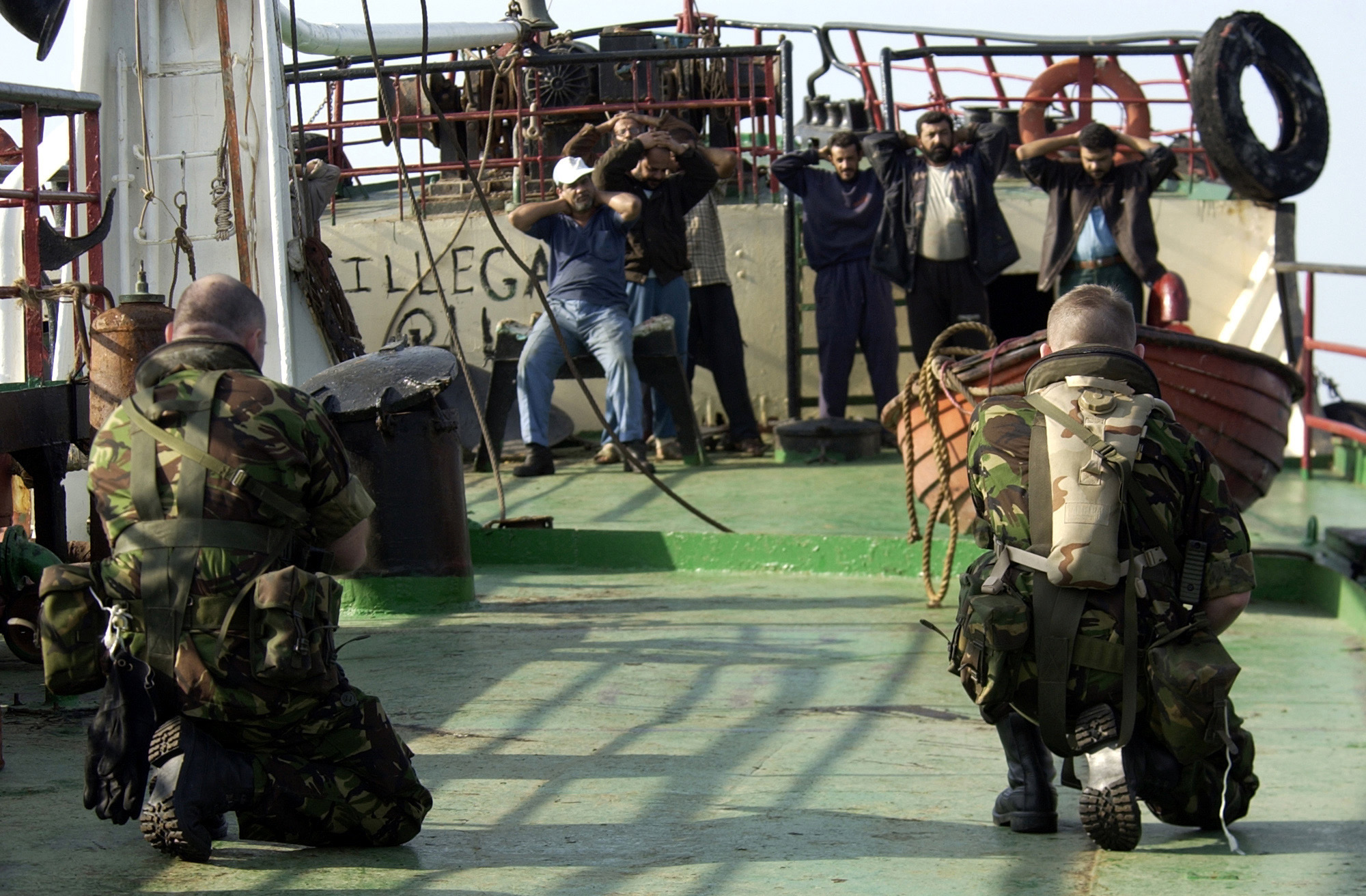
Royal Navy personnel guard the crew of an Iraqi oil tanker during Maritime Interdiction Operations supporting United Nations sanctions, in 2002.

From 2001, Britain became engaged in several long running conflicts in Afghanistan, the Middle East and North Africa, including hostilities in Syria, Iraq, and Libya. These wars largely stem from the September 11 attacks, and the Arab Spring. Some of these conflicts are also considered part of the global war on terrorism.

=== Trident programme, 1994- present ===
With the retirement of the Polaris missile planned for the mid 1990s, Trident was designed in the later stages of the Cold War as a continuing submarine-launched British Nuclear deterrent. The project was intended to defend against an attack from the Warsaw Pact nations—a foe which had disbanded by the time the first Trident missiles ultimately entered service in 1994, aboard HMS Vanguard. Following the retirement of the WE.177 bomb in 1998, Trident became the only British nuclear programme in operation. The submarines are based at HMNB Clyde, on the west coast of Scotland. Particularly since the end of the Cold War, the programme has seen public opposition, notably from the Scottish National Party. The UK parliament voted to renew Trident in 2016, an action which extended the programme into the 2030s.

=== Sierra Leone, 2000 ===
The Sierra Leone Civil War (1991–2002) saw a brief British military intervention in 2000. HMS Norfolk was stationed in nearby international waters from 1999 over humanitarian concerns. A larger Royal Navy flotilla supported UN troops in late 2000, but only remained in the area for a few weeks. The intervention took place late in the Civil War, and while successful it demonstrated issues with post- cold war naval policy that had not been addressed in the 1998 Strategic Defence Review (SDR). The document had not foreseen a need for British involvement in sub-Saharan Africa on that scale. This was one of the reasons for the change of direction in naval policy offered by the 2003 paper "Delivering Security in a Changing World".

=== Afghanistan, 2001–2014 ===
An international coalition invaded Afghanistan in the wake of the 11 September attacks. With Afghanistan being a landlocked country, the navy was involved less than other branches of the British armed forces. However, 1,000 navy personnel were deployed in Helmand Province in 2008, due to a shortage of troops with specialist skills. The navy personnel worked in support roles such as radio operators, drivers, and medics. From 2006 to 2014, the navy personnel were also responsible for repair work for aircraft. The navy was not part of Operation Toral, the continued British presence in Afghanistan, with all Helmand troops withdrawn in 2014. The withdrawal took place amidst significant debate about the rationale, impact, and casualties of the war in Afghanistan.

=== Iraq war, 2003–2011 ===
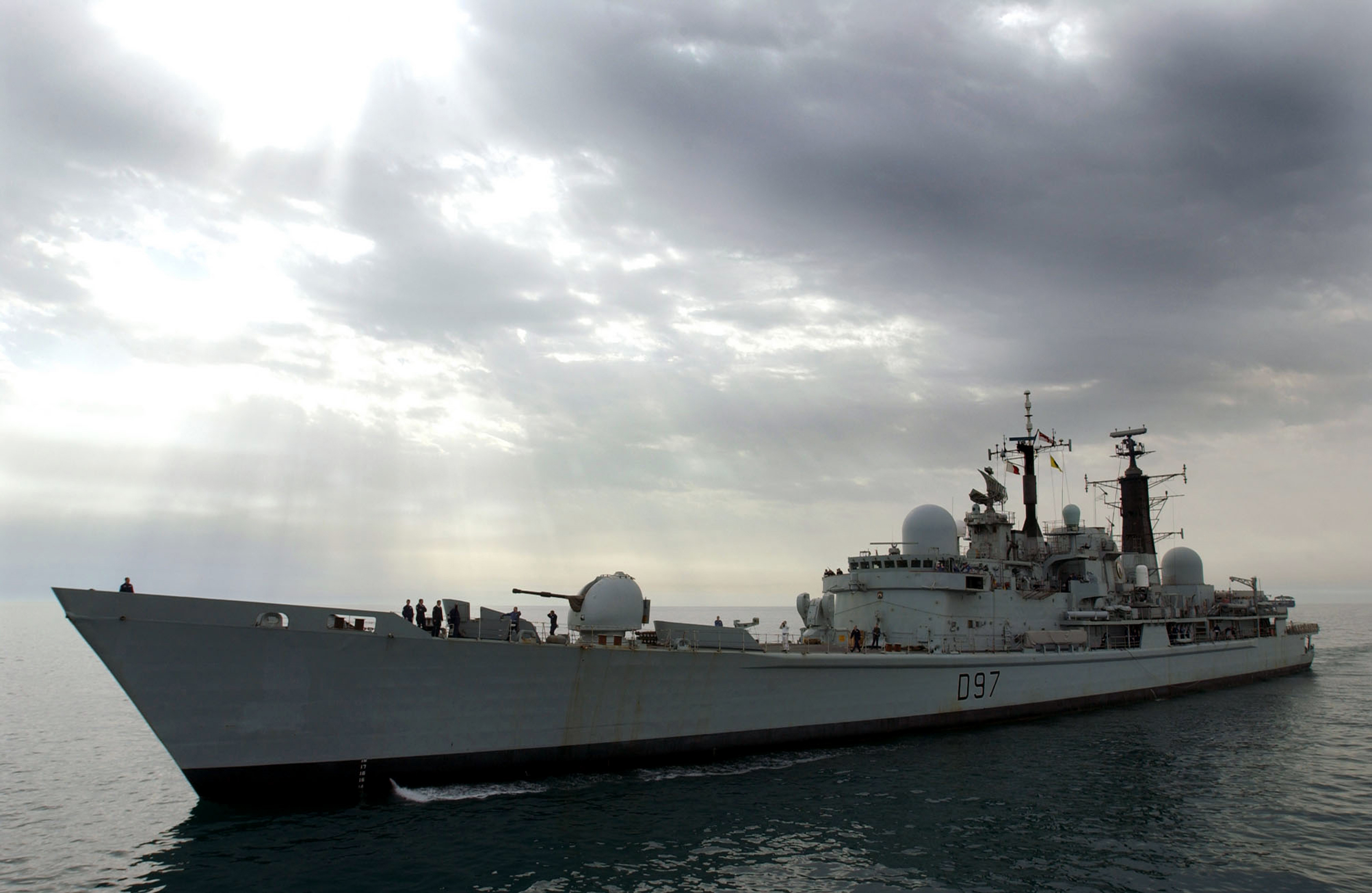
HMS Edinburgh on patrol in the gulf, March 2003

The Navy took part in the 2003 Iraq War as part of Operation Telic under Commander David Snelson. The Navy was both involved in the 2003 invasion as well as the subsequent insurgency period. This conflict saw RN warships bombard positions in support of the Al Faw Peninsula landings by Royal Marines. HMS Splendid and Turbulent (S87) launched a number of Tomahawk cruise missiles at targets in Iraq. By the later stages of the operation the navy was present in a training capacity, working with Iraqi sailors. The war also saw two major international incidents caused by Iranian capture of Royal Navy personnel in the Persian Gulf.

In 2004, Iranian armed forces took Royal Navy personnel prisoner, including Royal Marines, on the Shatt al-Arab (Arvand Rud in Persian) river, between Iran and Iraq. They were released three days later following diplomatic discussions between the UK and Iran. In August 2005 the Royal Navy rescued seven Russians stranded in a submarine off the Kamchatka peninsula. Using its Scorpio 45, a remote-controlled mini-sub, the submarine was freed from the fishing nets and cables that had held the Russian submarine for three days.

In 2007, Iranian armed forces also took prisoner Royal Navy personnel, including Royal Marines, when a boarding party from HMS Cornwall was seized in the waters between Iran and Iraq, in the Persian Gulf. They were released thirteen days later. The Royal Navy was also involved in an incident involving Somali pirates in November 2008, after the pirates tried to capture a civilian vessel.

While most British forces were recalled in 2009, 81 Royal Navy personnel were present in Umm Qasr for training purposes until their final withdrawal in 2011.

=== Strategic Review Cuts, 2010–2020 ===
The navy faced significant cuts following the Strategic Defence and Security Review 2010, amid wider austerity in the United Kingdom during the 2010s. The review reduced the number of personnel by 5,000 to a total of 30,000. A 2013 report found that the navy was already too small, and that Britain would have to depend on her allies if her territories were attacked. These losses were partially mitigated in the 2015 review which added 400 personnel, due to "concern about the ability of the armed forces to fulfil all the tasks expected of them". The surface fleet was reduced by 9 ships to 19 over the period. The decommission of the Ark Royal was brought forward to 2011, leaving the navy without a commissioned aircraft carrier for the first time since they were introduced to the fleet in 1918. Capability was restored with the commission of HMS Queen Elizabeth in 2017. The reviews also resulted in a significant reduction in defence estate, with approximately 30% of MoD estate to be disposed in the period. This included a small amount of the naval estate, including HMS Sultan.

=== First Libyan civil war, 2011 ===
The Royal Navy was among the British forces that took part in the military intervention in Libya. The operation began on 19 March, two days after United Nations Security Council Resolution 1973, which granted the international mandate for the action. The Navy was involved on several levels - this included submarine-launched missile strikes, particularly in the early stages of the fighting, and evacuation of civilians. HMS Liverpool was attacked by a shore battery during the fighting, the first time a Royal Navy ship had been fired at since the Falklands War in 1982. Liverpool destroyed the battery with her main gun, along with a munitions convoy later that day. The operation concluded on 31 October, shortly after the death of Gaddafi which concluded the civil war.

=== War on ISIL, 2014–present ===
The 2014 rise of the Islamic State of Iraq and the Levant resulted in British military intervention under Operation Shader. This drew the Royal Navy back into Libyan and Iraqi waters, which it had withdrawn from only three years previously. In Libya this was in order to evacuate civilians while in Iraq and Syria this was to support air strikes. During the initial hostilities, HMS Defender took on the role of escort in the gulf for the USS George H W Bush, while other ships acted from the Mediterranean.

== Trends in ship strength ==
In numeric terms the Royal Navy has significantly reduced in size since the 1960s, reflecting the reducing requirement of the state. This raw figure does not take into account the increase in technological capability of the Navy's ships, but it does show the general reduction of capacity. The following table is a breakdown of the fleet numbers since 1960. The separate types of ship and how their numbers have changed are shown.

Year	Submarines				Carriers			Assault ships	Surface combatants				Mine countermeasure vessels	Patrol ships and craft	Total
Year	Total	SSBN	SSN	SS & SSK	Total	CV	CV(L)	Assault ships	Total	Cruisers	Destroyers	Frigates	Mine countermeasure vessels	Patrol ships and craft	Total
1960	48	0	0	48	9	6	3	0	145	6	55	84	?	?	202
1965	47	0	1	46	6	4	2	0	117	5	36	76	?	?	170
1970	42	4	3	35	5	3	2	2	97	4	19	74	?	?	146
1975	32	4	8	20	3	1	2	2	72	2	10	60	43	14	166
1980	32	4	11	17	3	0	3	2	67	1	13	53	36	22	162
1985	33	4	14	15	4	0	4	2	56	0	15	41	45	32	172
1990	31	4	17	10	3	0	3	2	49	0	14	35	41	34	160
1995	16	4	12	0	3	0	3	2	35	0	12	23	18	32	106
2000	16	4	12	0	3	0	3	3	32	0	11	21	21	23	98
2005	15	4	11	0	3	0	3	2	28	0	9	19	16	26	90
2010	12	4	8	0	3	0	3	3	24	0	7	17	16	23	78
2015	10	4	6	0	0	0	0	3	19	0	6	13	15	23	70
2020	11	4	7	0	2	2	0	2	19	0	6	13	13	30	77
2025	9	4	5	0	2	2	0	0	14	0	6	8	7	29	61

- 'Patrol ships and craft' as of 2025 include: 8 Offshore Patrol Vessels, 1 Survey Ship, 1 Survey Motor Launch, 1 Icebreaker and 18 Patrol Boats.
- Current figures exclude the main 13 auxiliary support vessels currently used by the Royal Fleet Auxiliary that provide at sea replenishment, as sea maintenance if required, some patrol tasks acting as "mothership" and also form as a main logistics transport fleet, utilising vessels such as the Bay-class landing ship and others.

== Royal Navy timeline and battles ==
- 1701–1713 War of the Spanish Succession
- 1718–1720 War of the Quadruple Alliance
- 1740–1748 War of the Austrian Succession
- 1754–1763 Seven Years' War
- 1775–1783 American War of Independence (against France 1778-1783.)
- 1793–1802 French Revolutionary Wars
- 1803–1815 Napoleonic Wars
- 1808–1856 The West Africa Squadron suppresses the Atlantic slave trade.
- 1812–1814 War of 1812
- 1821 First paddle steamer for auxiliary use
- 1827 Battle of Navarino is the last fleet action between wooden sailing ships.
- 1839–1842 Opium War
- 1840 First screw-driven warship, Rattler
- 1853–1856 Crimean War
- 1856–1860 Second Opium War
- 1860 First iron-hulled armoured battleship, Warrior
- 1902 First British submarine, HMS Holland 1
- 1905 First steam turbine-powered "all big-gun" battleship, Dreadnought
- 1914–1918 First World War
- 1918 First true aircraft carrier, HMS Argus
- 1918–1920 Russian Civil War
- 1931 Invergordon Mutiny
- 1939–1945 Battle of the Atlantic
- 1940 Norwegian Campaign
- 1940 Dunkirk evacuation
- 1940–1944 Battle of the Mediterranean
- 1941–1945 Arctic Convoys
- 1941–1945 South-East Asian Theatre
- 1944 Normandy landings
- 1944–1945 British Pacific Fleet
- 1946 Corfu Channel Incident
- 1949 Amethyst incident on the Yangtze River
- 1950–1953 Korean War
- 1956 Suez Crisis
- 1958–1976 Cod Wars
- 1959 The last battleship, Vanguard, is decommissioned.
- 1962–1966 Indonesia–Malaysia confrontation
- 1963 First British nuclear submarine, Dreadnought
- 1966–1975 Beira Patrol against Rhodesia
- 1977 Operation Journeyman to guard the Falkland Islands
- 1980–2002 Armilla patrol in the Persian Gulf
- 1982 Falklands War
- 1991 First Gulf War
- 1999 Operation Allied Force – Kosovo conflict
- 2000 Operation Palliser – Sierra Leone
- 2001–2014 Operation Herrick – Afghanistan Campaign
- 2002–present Combined Maritime Forces in the Indian Ocean
- 2003–2009 Operation Telic – Invasion of Iraq
- 2011 Operation Ellamy – Libyan Civil War
- 2014–present Operation Shader – Military intervention against the Islamic State of Iraq and the Levant

== See also ==
- Articles of War (Royal Navy) superseded by the Armed Forces Act 2006
- History of the Royal Marines
- History of the Royal Naval Reserve
- List of ships and sailors of the Royal Navy
- List of all naval vessels current and former of the United Kingdom
- Maritime history of the United Kingdom
- Naval history

== Sources ==
- Ballantyne, Iain (2004). Strike From the Sea. US Naval Institute Press. ISBN 978-1591148449.
- Barrow, Geoffrey Wallis Steuart (2005). Robert Bruce and the Community of the Realm of Scotland. Edinburgh: Edinburgh University Press. ISBN 0-7486-2022-2.
- Benn, Carl (2002). The War of 1812. Oxford: Osprey Publishing. ISBN 978-1-84176-466-5.
- Brooks, David (2000). Gladstone Centenary Essays: Gladstone's Fourth Administration, 1892–1894, David Bebbington and Roger Swift (eds.). Liverpool University Press. ISBN 978-0853239352.
- Brown, David (1987). The Royal Navy and Falklands War. Barnsley, England: Pen and Sword. ISBN 9781473817791.
- Day, Lance; McNeil, Ian (2013). Biographical Dictionary of the History of Technology. Routledge. ISBN 978-0-203-02829-2.
- Dorman, Andrew M. (2009). Blair's Successful War: British Military Intervention in Sierra Leone. Farnham: Ashgate Publishing. ISBN 978-0-7546-7299-9.
- Durston, Gregory (2017). The Admiralty Sessions, 1536-1834: Maritime Crime and the Silver Oar. Cambridge Scholars Publishing. ISBN 9781443873611.
- Fissel, Mark Charles (1991). War and government in Britain, 1598-1650. Manchester University Press. ISBN 0-7190-2887-6.
- Gardiner, Robert; Gray, Randal; Budzbon, Przemyslaw (1985). Conway's All the World's Fighting Ships 1906–1921. Annapolis: Naval Institute Press. ISBN 0-87021-907-3.
- Gardiner, Robert (2004). The Line of Battle: The Sailing Warship 1650-1840. Conway Maritime Press. ISBN 978-0851779546.
- Grantham, John (2012). Iron, as a material for ship-building; being a communication to the Polytechnic society of Liverpool. Rare Books. ISBN 978-1130800548.
- Hamley, Sir Edward Bruce (1877). Voltaire. Edinburgh; London: Wm. Blackwood & Sons.
- Harbottle, Thomas Benfield; Bruce, George (1979). Harbottle's Dictionary of Battles (second ed.). Granada. ISBN 0-246-11103-8.
- Heathcote, Tony (2002). The British Admirals of the Fleet 1734 – 1995. Pen & Sword Ltd. ISBN 0-85052-835-6.
- Herwig, Holger H. (1980). Luxury Fleet, The Imperial German Navy 1888–1918. London: The Ashfield Press. ISBN 0-948660-03-1.
- Hickey, Donald R. (1989). The War of 1812: A Forgotten Conflict. Urbana; Chicago: University of Illinois Press. ISBN 0-252-01613-0.
- Kennedy, Paul (1989). The Rise and Fall of Great Powers. London: Fontana. ISBN 978-0049090194.
- Leckie, Robert (1998). The Wars of America. University of Michigan. ISBN 0-06-012571-3.
- Lyon, David (1996). The First Destroyers. Chatham Publishing. ISBN 1-55750-271-4.
- Marley, David (1998). Wars of the Americas, a Chronology of Armed Conflict in the New World, 1492 to the Present. ABC-CLIO. ISBN 9780874368376.
- Marriott, Leo (2005). Treaty Cruisers: The first international warship building competition. Pen & Sword Maritime, Barnsley. ISBN 1-84415-188-3.
- Massie, Robert (1992). Dreadnought. Ballantine Books. ISBN 0-345-37556-4.
- Neff, Donald (1981). Warriors at Suez : Eisenhower takes America into the Middle-East. New York: Simon and Schuster. ISBN 978-0-671-41010-0.
- Ollard, Richard Lawrence (1984). Pepys: A biography. Atheneum. ISBN 978-0689706790.
- Pappalardo, Bruno (2019). How to Survive in the Georgian Navy: A Sailor's Guide. London: Osprey Publishing. ISBN 978-1-47-283086-9.
- Pemsel, Helmut (1977). Atlas of Naval Warfare. Arms and Armour Press. ISBN 978-0853683513.
- Reid, Stuart (2002). Culloden Moor 1746: The Death of the Jacobite Cause. Campaign series. Vol. 106. Osprey Publishing. ISBN 1-84176-412-4.
- Rodger, Nicholas (2004). The Command of the Ocean: A Naval History of Britain, 1649–1815. Allen Lane. p. 1000. ISBN 978-0141026909.
- Royle, Charles (1900). The Egyptian Campaigns (1882–1885). London: Hurst and Blackett. "1882 alexandria bombardment."
- Sondhaus, Lawrence (2001). Naval Warfare, 1815-1914. New York: Routledge. ISBN 978-0415214780.
- Wills, Rebecca (2002). The Jacobites and Russia, 1715-1750. Dundurn. ISBN 1862321426.
- Winfield, Rif (2009). British Warships in the Age of Sail 1603-1714: Design, Construction, Careers and Fates. Seaforth. ISBN 978-1848320406.
