= Timeline of aircraft carriers of the Royal Navy =

The following is a timeline of fleet aircraft carriers of the Royal Navy of the United Kingdom. The first British aircraft carrier was HMS Argus, a converted liner hull.

In addition, during the Second World War, the Royal Navy operated flights of aircraft off merchant aircraft carriers.

== Timeline ==
In general, labels for ships of a single class are aligned vertically with the topmost ship in a column carrying the class name.

In an attempt to show the full timeline of the actual existence of each ship, the final dates on each bar may variously be the date struck, sold, scrapped, scuttled, sunk as a reef, etc., as appropriate to show the last time it existed as a floating object.

== See also ==
- Aircraft carrier
- List of aircraft carriers
- List of aircraft carriers by configuration
- List of aircraft carriers in service
- List of aircraft carriers of the United States Navy
- List of aircraft maintenance carriers of the Royal Navy
- List of aircraft carriers of Russia and the Soviet Union
- List of amphibious warfare ships
- List of escort aircraft carriers of the Royal Navy
- List of German aircraft carriers
- List of seaplane carriers of the Royal Navy
- List of sunken aircraft carriers
- Timeline for aircraft carrier service

== Bibliography ==
- Hobbs, David (2013). British Aircraft Carriers: Design, Development and Service Histories. Seaforth Publishing. ISBN 978-1-84832-138-0.
