= USS Macedonian =

Two ships in the United States Navy have been named USS Macedonian.

- The first USS Macedonian (1810) was a 38-gun sailing frigate, originally HMS Macedonian of the Royal Navy, captured by Stephen Decatur in the War of 1812.
- The second USS Macedonian (1836) was rebuilt from the keel of the first Macedonian and placed in service in 1836.
