= HMS Shah =

Two ships of the British Royal Navy have been named HMS Shah:

- HMS Shah (1873) was an iron hulled, wooden sheathed frigate launched in 1873. She was originally to be named HMS Blonde but was renamed following the visit of the Shah of Persia. On 28 May 1877 she fired the first torpedo to be used in action, although without effect. Converted to a coal hulk in 1904 and renamed C.470. The hulk was sold 1919 and wrecked in 1926 at Bermuda.
- HMS Shah (D21) was the escort aircraft carrier Jamaica (CVE-43) loaned from the US from 1943 to 1945.
