= HMS Prince of Wales =

Seven ships of the Royal Navy have been named HMS Prince of Wales, after numerous holders of the title the Prince of Wales.

- HMS Prince of Wales (1765) was a 74-gun third rate launched in 1765. She had been originally planned as HMS Hibernia, but the name was changed prior to launch. She was broken up in 1783.
- HMS Prince of Wales (1794) was a 98-gun second rate launched in 1794 and broken up in 1822.
- HMS Prince of Wales (1795) was a 38-gun transport purchased in 1795, and still on the records in 1801.
- HMS Prince of Wales (1860) was a 121-gun screw-propelled first rate launched in 1860. She was converted to a training ship and renamed HMS Britannia in 1869, hulked in 1909 and sold in 1914. She was finally broken up in 1916.
- HMS Prince of Wales (1902) was a London-class battleship launched in 1902 and sold for scrap in 1920.
- HMS Prince of Wales (53) was a King George V-class battleship launched in 1939 and sunk in a Japanese airstrike on 10 December 1941.
- HMS Prince of Wales (R09) is the second Queen Elizabeth-class aircraft carrier.

== Battle honours ==
- St. Lucia 1778
- Groix Island 1795
- Dardanelles 1915
- Bismarck 1941
- Malta Convoys 1941

== See also ==
- Prince of Wales (ship) - the name of several British merchant vessels
- Prince of Wales (EIC ship) - several ships serving the British East India Company (EIC)
  - HCS Prince of Wales was a 14-gun sloop launched in 1805 at Bombay Dockyard for the Bombay Marine, the EIC's naval arm. She was sold in 1826 or 1827. In 1829 she was listed as being registered at Bombay.
- HMS Thrush was an 18-gun sloop launched in 1794 for the Customs Service under the name Prince of Wales. The Admiralty purchased her in 1806 and sent her out to Jamaica where she was hulked in 1809 and where she sank at anchor in 1815.
- Prince of Wales was a vessel belonging to the Excise service of Scotland in 1799 that was responsible for the coast between the Mull of Kintyre and Cape Wrath. She was of 300 tons (bm), and armed with 20 guns. She had a crew of 50 men under William Murray.
- Prince of Wales a revenue cruiser, built around 1812, and with the Experimental Squadron of 1832.
