= HMS Prince of Wales (R09) =

2019 Queen Elizabeth-class aircraft carrier of the Royal Navy

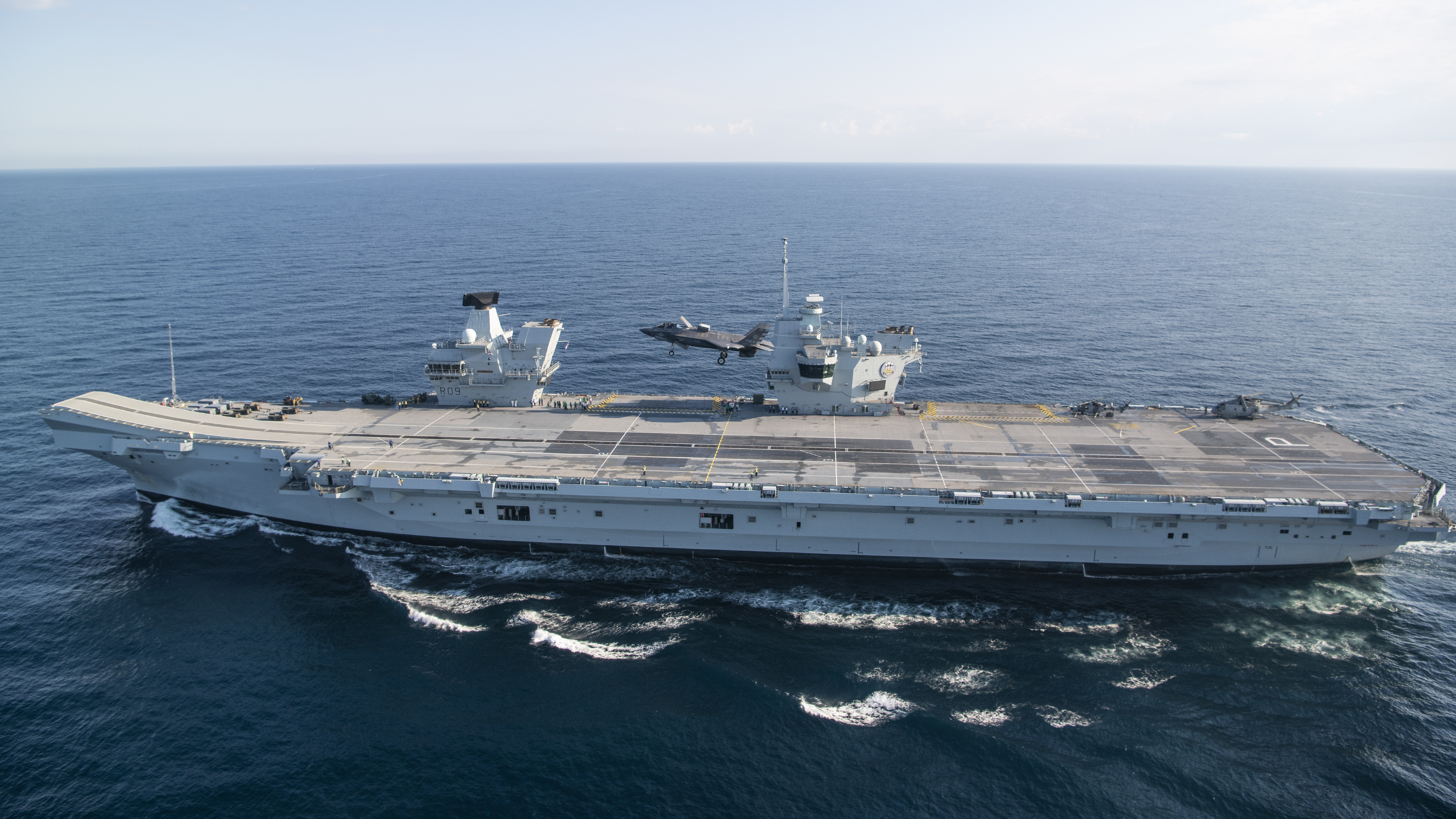
- HMS Prince of Wales, October 2023

History

United Kingdom
- Name: HMS Prince of Wales
- Namesake: HRH the Prince of Wales
- Operator: Royal Navy
- Ordered: 20 May 2008
- Builder: Aircraft Carrier Alliance
- Cost: Program cost: £6.1 billion; Unit cost: £3 billion
- Launched: 21 December 2017
- Sponsored by: Camilla, Duchess of Cornwall
- Christened: 8 September 2017
- Commissioned: 10 December 2019
- Home port: HMNB Portsmouth
- Identification: Pennant number: R09; Deck code: P; IMO number: 4907907
- Motto: "Ich Dien" – German: "I serve"
- Nickname(s): PoW
- Honours and awards: St Lucia 1778; Ile de Groix 1795; Dardanelles 1915–16; Bismarck 1941; Malta Convoys 1941–42 (Note: The ship carries the battle honours earned by its predecessors.)
- Status: In active service
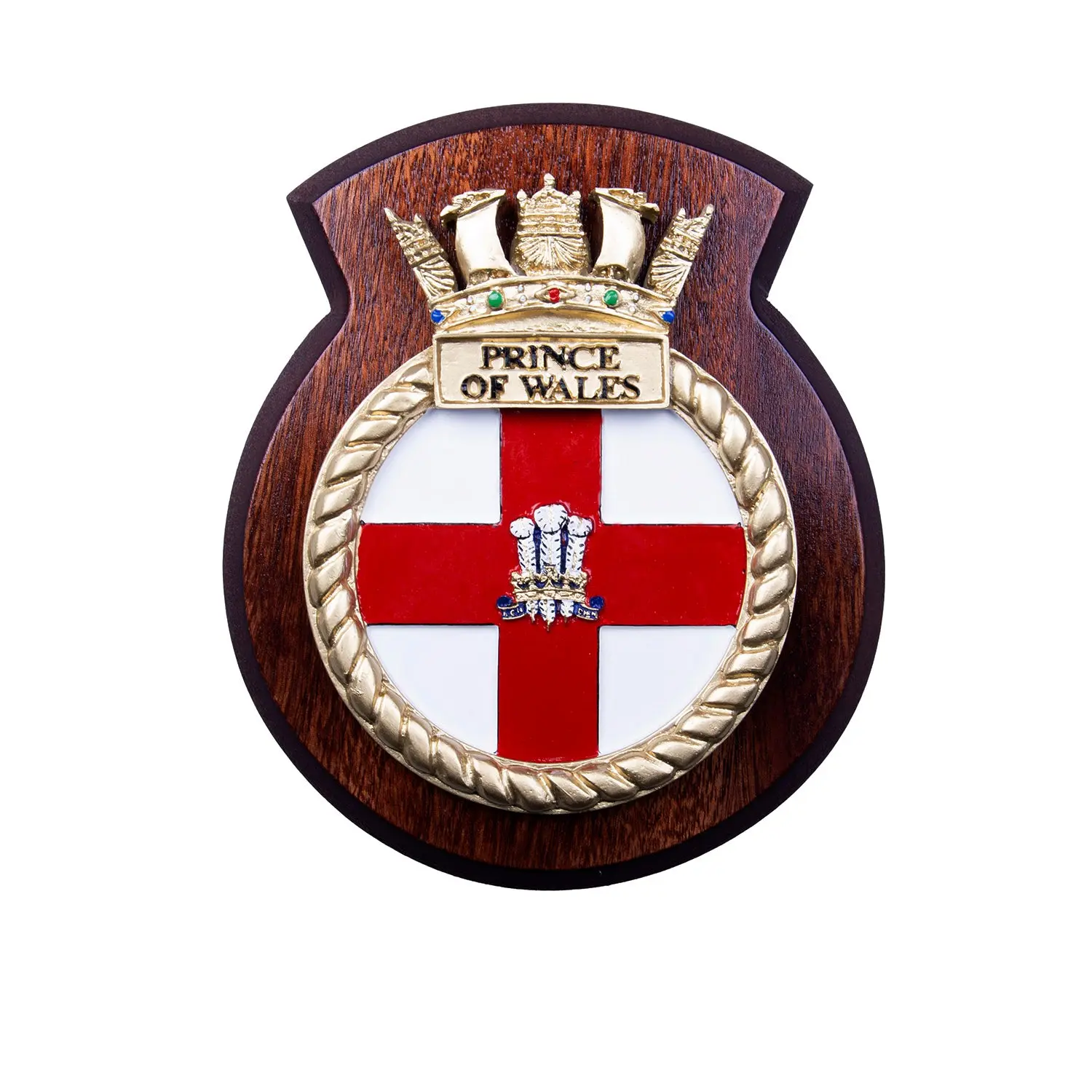
- Badge

General characteristics
- Class & type: Queen Elizabeth-class aircraft carrier
- Displacement: Est. 80,600 tonnes (79,300 long tons) full load
- Length: 284 m (932 ft)
- Beam: 39 m (128 ft)(waterline); 73 m (240 ft) overall
- Draught: 11 metres
- Decks: 9 decks below the flight deck; 16,000 square metres
- Speed: 25 knots (46 km/h; 29 mph), tested to 32 knots (59 km/h; 37 mph)
- Range: 10,000 nautical miles (19,000 km)
- Boats & landing craft carried: 3 × Sea-class workboats; 2 × Pacific 24 RIBs
- Capacity: 1,600
- Troops: 250
- Complement: 679
- Sensors & processing systems: S1850M long range radar; Type 997 Artisan 3D medium range radar; Ultra Electronics Series 2500 Electro Optical System (EOS); Glide Path Camera (GPC)
- Armament: 3 × Phalanx CIWS; 4 × 30mm DS30M Mk2 guns (for but not with); 6 × Miniguns (originally fit; retired in 2023 and replaced by Browning .50 caliber heavy machine guns)
- Aircraft carried: Current planned carrier air wing of up to 24 to 36 F-35 Lightning IIs plus helicopters; (65+ aircraft surge capacity): F-35 Lightning II; Chinook CH47; Apache AH64; Merlin HM2 and HC4; Wildcat HMA2 and AH1; Maritime Airborne Surveillance Capability (MASC) – Airborne Early Warning aircraft
- Aviation facilities: Hangar below deck; Two aircraft lifts; Refuelling and rearming facilities; Ski jump

HMS Prince of Wales (R09) is the second Queen Elizabeth-class aircraft carrier and the Fleet Flagship of the Royal Navy. Prince of Wales is not fitted with catapults and arrestor wires, being designed to operate STOVL aircraft. She carries up to 48 F-35B Lightning II stealth multirole fighters and Merlin helicopters for airborne early warning and anti-submarine warfare. In surge conditions she is capable of supporting 70+ F-35B. The design emphasises flexibility, with accommodation for 250 Royal Marines and the ability to support them with attack helicopters and troop transports.

The completed Prince of Wales began sea trials in September 2019 and first arrived at her new home base of HMNB Portsmouth in November 2019. The ship was formally commissioned into the Royal Navy at a ceremony in Portsmouth on 10 December 2019. The ship's commissioning date marked the 78th anniversary of the sinking of her predecessor, a World War II era battleship which was lost in action along with HMS Repulse in 1941. She is the eighth Royal Navy ship to have the name HMS Prince of Wales. Construction of the ship began in 2011 at Rosyth Dockyard and ended with launch on 21 December 2017. She was handed over to the Royal Navy in 2019.

When on operations, Prince of Wales has formed a central part of a UK Carrier Strike Group, comprising escorts and support ships, with the aim to facilitate carrier-enabled power projection.

== Design and construction ==
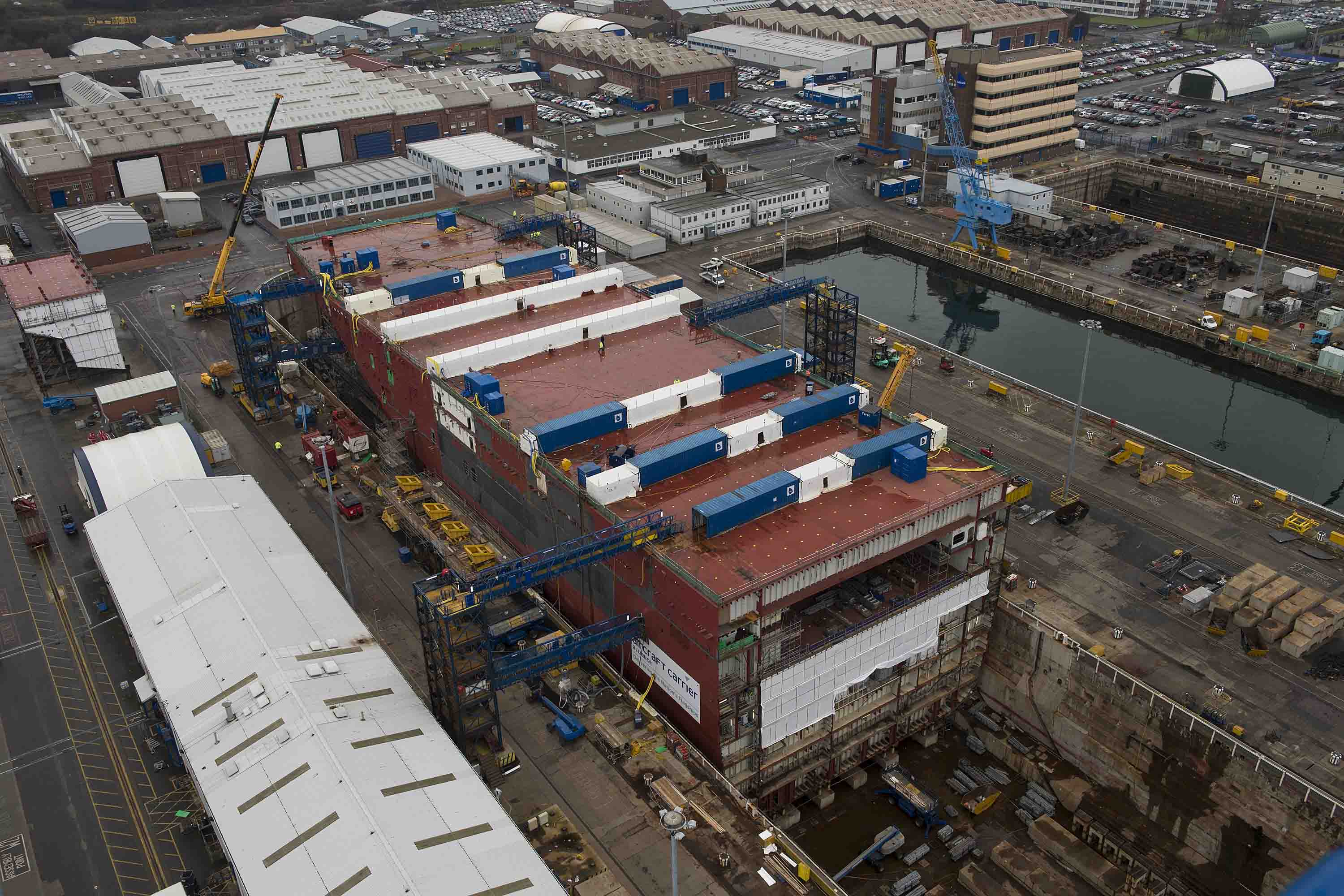
Prince of Wales under construction at Rosyth Dockyard in December 2014

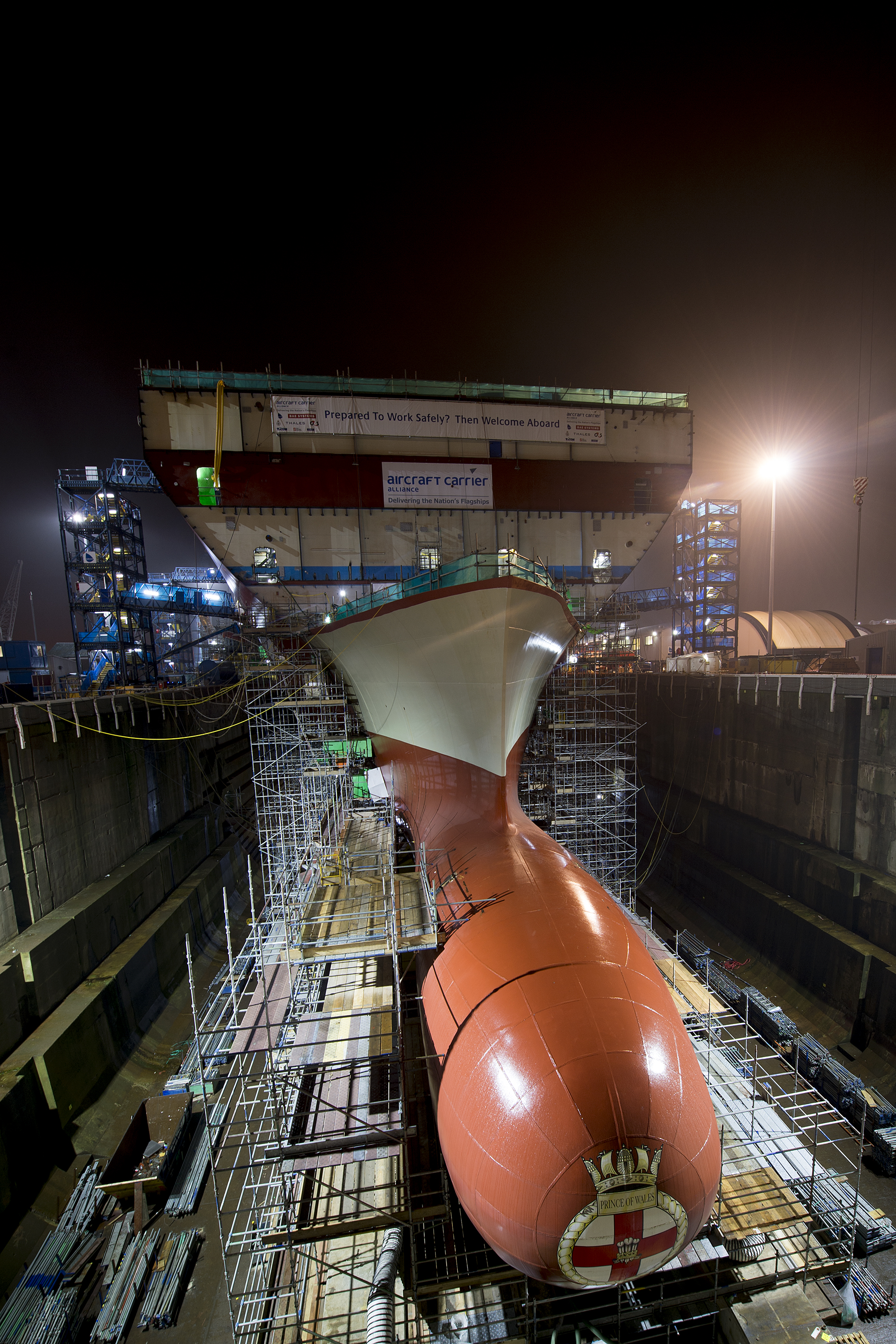
The bow section of Prince of Wales in December 2014

Much like her sister Queen Elizabeth, the original 2008 design of Prince of Wales envisaged flying F-35B Lightning II Short Take-Off and Vertical Landing (STOVL) jets from a ski-jump ramp. However, in May 2010, the government published its long-awaited Strategic Defence and Security Review (SDSR), which stated that Prince of Wales would be converted to a Catapult Assisted Take-Off But Arrested Recovery (CATOBAR) configuration, operating the F-35C. An 18-month study commenced into the conversion but ultimately found that it would cause severe cost implications and delays. In May 2012, the government announced it would be reversing its decision to convert Prince of Wales and that the ship would be built to its original STOVL design.

The SDSR also stipulated that the UK only required one aircraft carrier. However penalty clauses in the contract meant that cancelling Prince of Wales would be more expensive than building her. Instead, the government planned to construct Prince of Wales and then either place her into extended readiness or have her sold to an ally. Contrary to this, in 2012, the Royal Navy published its annual yearbook, titled A Global Force 2012/13, which stated that both carriers are "likely to be commissioned and may even be capable of operating together".

Prince of Wales was assembled at Rosyth from 52 blocks built by six shipyards around the UK. Construction began on 26 May 2011 with the first steel being cut at Govan shipyard by Defence Secretary Liam Fox. In September 2014, Prince of Wales reached a final assembly phase when hull blocks LB02 and LB03 were floated into 1 Dock of Rosyth dockyard, Scotland.

During the 2014 NATO Summit in Wales, Prime Minister David Cameron announced that Prince of Wales would be brought into active service, rather than sold off or mothballed. This was later confirmed in the government's 2015 Strategic Defence and Security Review.

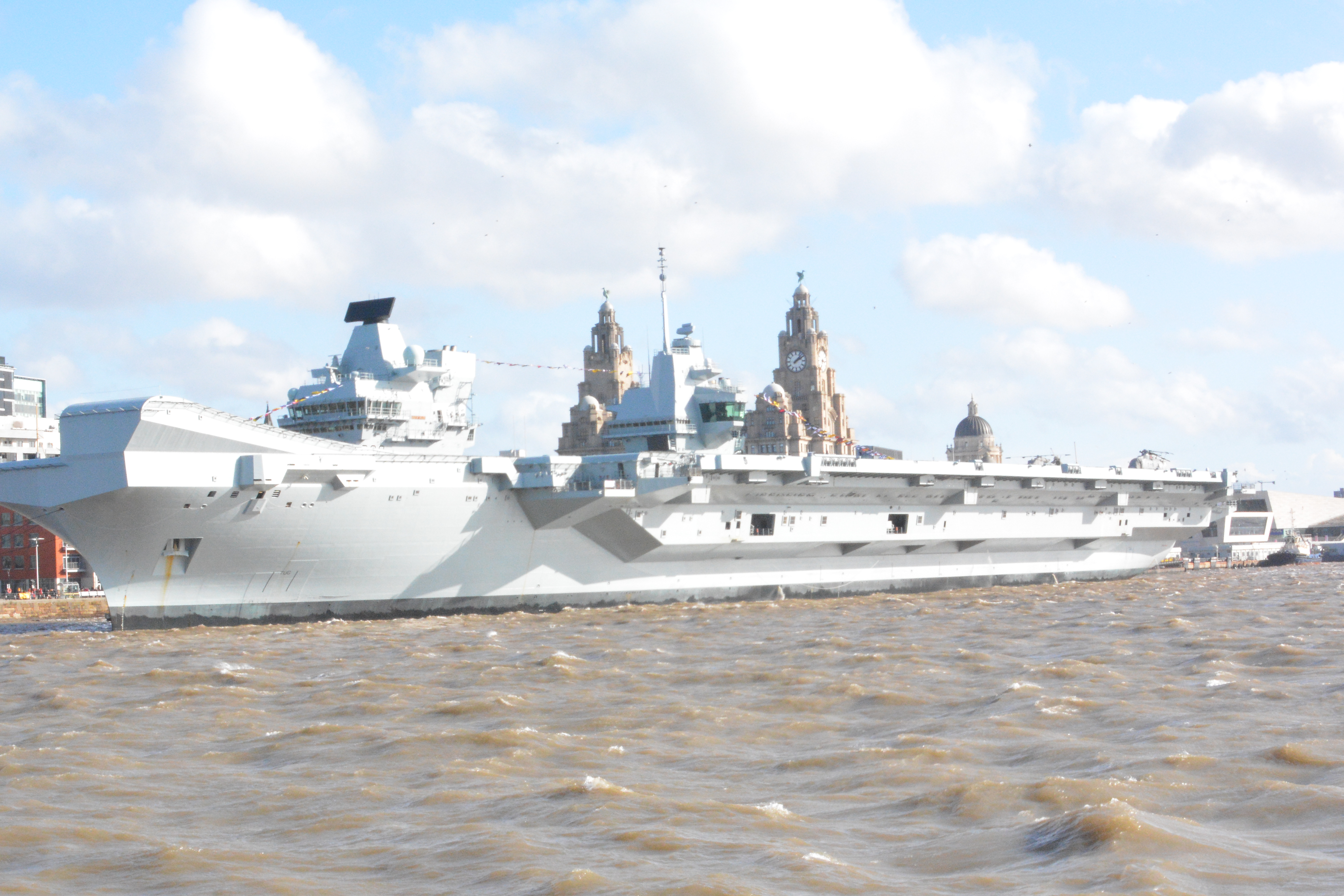
Prince of Wales alongside in Liverpool in 2020

In April 2016, the ship was said to be around 80% structurally complete. On 1 September 2017 HMS Prince of Wales' most senior officer, Captain Ian Groom, confirmed that the carrier was now essential to fulfilling the Royal Navy's 'full carrier strike capability.'

=== Sea trials ===
Prince of Wales was formally named on 8 September 2017 at Rosyth dockyard by Queen Camilla, then the Duchess of Rothesay. On 21 December 2017, Prince of Wales was floated out of Rosyth drydock #1 for the first time and manoeuvred to a nearby jetty for fitting-out and further systems integration. A Merlin Mk2 helicopter landed and took off six times on her flight deck on 23 September 2019.

The Prince of Wales was due to commence sea trials in 2019 with a view to being commissioned in late 2019. The ship left the fitting out basin at Rosyth for the first time on 20 September 2019; initially she remained anchored in the Firth of Forth, undertaking initial engine and system tests, and waiting for the tide to allow her to pass under the bridges crossing the firth. HMS Prince of Wales sailed under the Firth of Forth bridges on 22 September 2019 and began sea trials.

On 16 November 2019, Prince of Wales arrived at her home base of Portsmouth for the first time, berthing at Princess Royal Jetty. The ship was formally commissioned into the Royal Navy at a ceremony in Portsmouth on 10 December 2019. She is expected to be fully ready for front-line duties around the globe from 2023.

On 28 February 2020, Prince of Wales arrived in her affiliated city of Liverpool for the first time on a week-long visit.

In May 2020, Prince of Wales experienced flooding which the Royal Navy described as "minor". This was followed by more significant flooding from the fire control system in October 2020 which caused damage to her electrical cabling. She was confined to docks where she remained for almost eight months whilst repairs were made. Her long-planned deployment to the United States to undertake her first F-35B trials was cancelled. During 2020 Prince of Wales was at sea just 30 days, compared to 115 days for Queen Elizabeth. Following repair Prince of Wales departed Portsmouth Naval Base to resume sea trials on 30 April 2021. In October 2021, the Royal Navy declared the ship as fully operational.

=== Aircraft ===
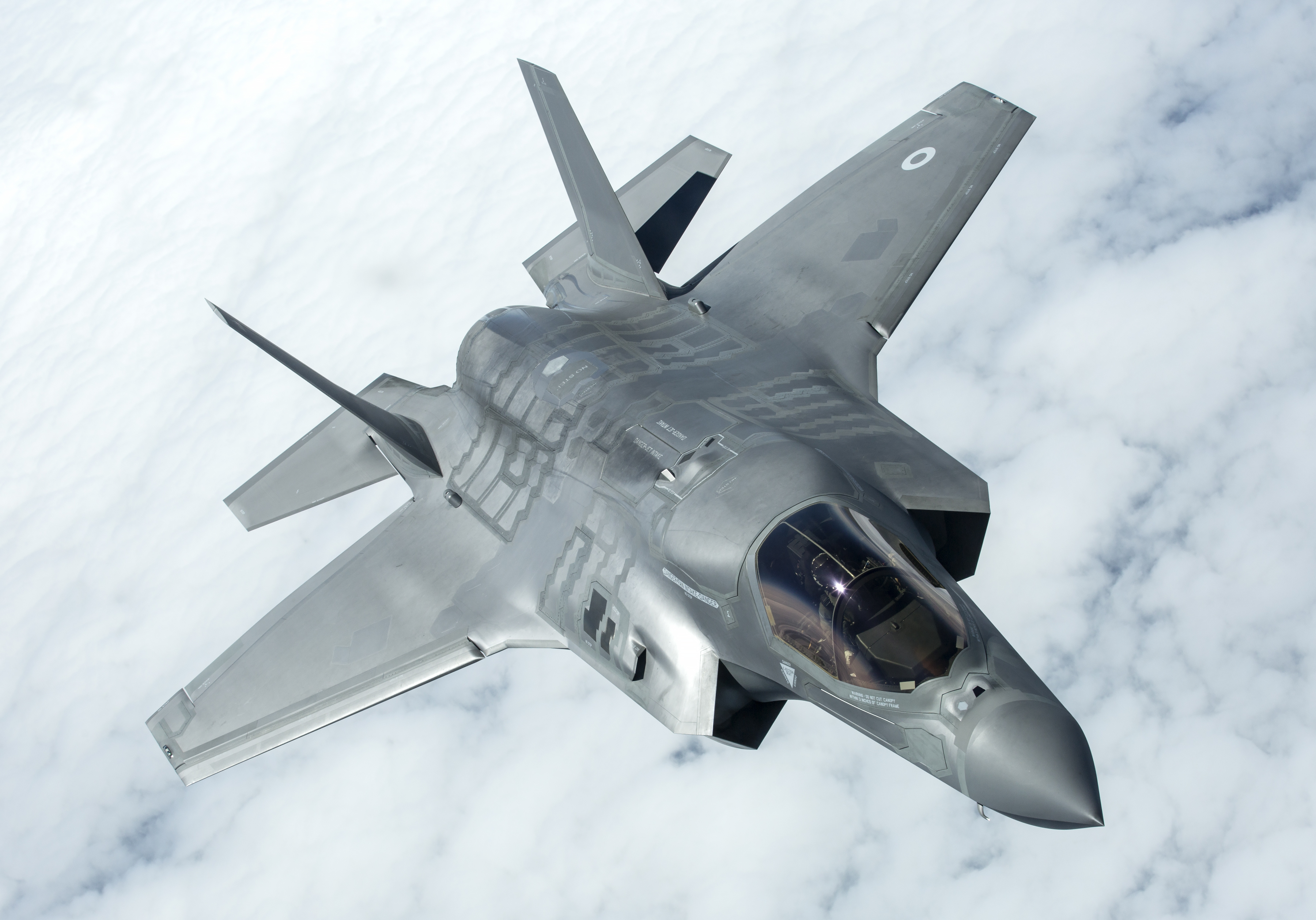
809 Naval Air Squadron will be the first Fleet Air Arm squadron to operate the F-35B

The two ships of the Queen Elizabeth class are each expected to be capable of carrying forty aircraft, a maximum of 36 Lockheed Martin F-35B Lightning II stealth multirole fighters and four AgustaWestland Merlin helicopters. The 2010 SDSR anticipated the routine deployment of twelve F-35Bs, but a typical warload will be 24 F-35Bs and some helicopters. These could be a Maritime Force Protection package of nine anti-submarine Merlin HM2 and five Merlin Crowsnest for airborne early warning; alternatively a "littoral manoeuvre" package could potentially include a mix of Royal Navy Commando Helicopter Force Merlin HC4, AgustaWestland Wildcat AH1, RAF Boeing Chinook transports, and Army Air Corps AgustaWestland Apache AH.1 attack helicopters. In 2022, it was reported that initially five Merlins would be equipped with Crowsnest, and that three of these would normally be assigned to the "high readiness" aircraft carrier. As of September 2013 six landing spots are planned, but the deck could be marked out for the operation of ten medium helicopters at once, allowing the lift of a company of 250 troops. The hangars are designed for CH-47 Chinook operations without blade folding and for the Bell Boeing V-22 Osprey tiltrotor, whilst the aircraft lifts can accommodate two Chinooks with unfolded blades.

=== Passenger/crew transfer boats ===
The two ships of the Queen Elizabeth class were to each carry four PTBs made by Blyth-based company Alnmaritec. Each 13.1 m (43 ft) long PTB carries 36 passengers and two crew to operate the vessel and is davit-launched. To enable the craft to fit into the docking area the navigation and radar masts are fitted with Linak actuators so that they can be lowered automatically from the command console. The enclosed cabin is heated and there is a set of heads forward.

Subsequently, it was reported that Prince of Wales would carry three of the new Sea-class work boats being procured for various tasks in the Royal Navy.

=== Weapons systems ===
Defensive weapons include the Phalanx Close-In Weapons System for anti-aircraft and anti-missile defence and initially Miniguns for use against fast attack craft. In 2023, the Minigun was retired from Royal Navy service and replaced by Browning .50 caliber heavy machine guns. The 30mm Automated Small Calibre Guns are fitted for but not with, and not carried as of 2021.

=== Replica bell from predecessor ===
In spring 2019, Merseyside shipbuilder Cammell Laird, who built the ship's predecessor, the King George V-class battleship HMS Prince of Wales (53), and also built sections for both the current ship and HMS Queen Elizabeth (R08), was commissioned to make a replica of the predecessor's bell for the current ship. The original, raised in 2002 and currently residing at the National Museum of the Royal Navy location at the Portsmouth Historic Dockyard, was surveyed as part of the process.

Cammell Laird were able to contact Utley Offshore in St Helens, the foundry that made the original bell still had the original pattern based on the 1908 Admiralty design. Compared to the bronze or bell metal that is used in most modern ship bells, specially sourced nickel silver was used for authenticity. The engraving was done by Shawcross in Birkenhead, while Cammell Laird shipwrights constructed the hardwood base. Cammell Laird COO Tony Graham presented the finished replica to commanding officer Captain Darren Houston during the ship's week-long visit to Liverpool in March 2020.

== Name ==
The bow section of Prince of Wales is delivered to Rosyth Dockyard in May 2014; the ship's sister Queen Elizabeth is in the dry dock behind

The Queen Elizabeth-class carrier is the eighth HMS Prince of Wales, named after the title traditionally granted to the heir apparent of the British monarch. The name was announced at the same time as that of her sister ship Queen Elizabeth. The previous Prince of Wales was sunk by Japanese aircraft north of Singapore in December 1941.

The decommissioning of HMS Ark Royal under the SDSR in 2010 led to an unsuccessful campaign for one of the new aircraft carriers to receive that name.

== Operational history ==
In May 2020, Prince of Wales experienced flooding which the Royal Navy described as "minor". This was followed by more significant flooding in October 2020 which caused damage to her electrical cabling. Prince of Wales departed Portsmouth Naval Base on sea trials on 30 April 2021. In October 2021, the Royal Navy declared the ship as fully operational.

Prince of Wales participated in an international exercise off the coast of Scotland in October 2021. This involved joint operations with her sister ship HMS Queen Elizabeth.

=== NATO command ship ===
On 1 January 2022, Prince of Wales took over the role of command ship for NATO's maritime high readiness force from the French Navy. The ship was intended to spend the next twelve months supporting NATO exercises in the Arctic, Baltic and Mediterranean. Her first exercise in this role was Cold Response 22, a Norwegian-led exercise which was designed to test her crew in this role.

=== 2022 starboard propeller shaft external coupling malfunction ===
On 27 August 2022 Prince of Wales departed HMNB Portsmouth to undertake training exercises with the US Navy, the Royal Canadian Navy, and United States Marine Corps, and to host the Atlantic Future Forum trade and economic conference in New York. On 29 August after suffering mechanical problems in the UK's South Coast Exercise area, the ship proceeded to anchor in the Solent off the Isle of Wight. It was reported that an external coupling that connects the outer propeller shaft to the drive shaft from the propulsion motors had failed. Rear Admiral Steve Moorhouse, Director of Force Generation, confirmed "significant damage to the shaft and the propeller and some superficial damage to the rudder. There is no damage to the rest of the ship". She arrived in Rosyth for repairs on 12 October 2022, and was originally expected to return to Portsmouth in spring 2023 following completion of repair work. The ship returned to sea for trials after completing repairs on 21 July 2023.

=== 2023 aircraft and UAV trials ===
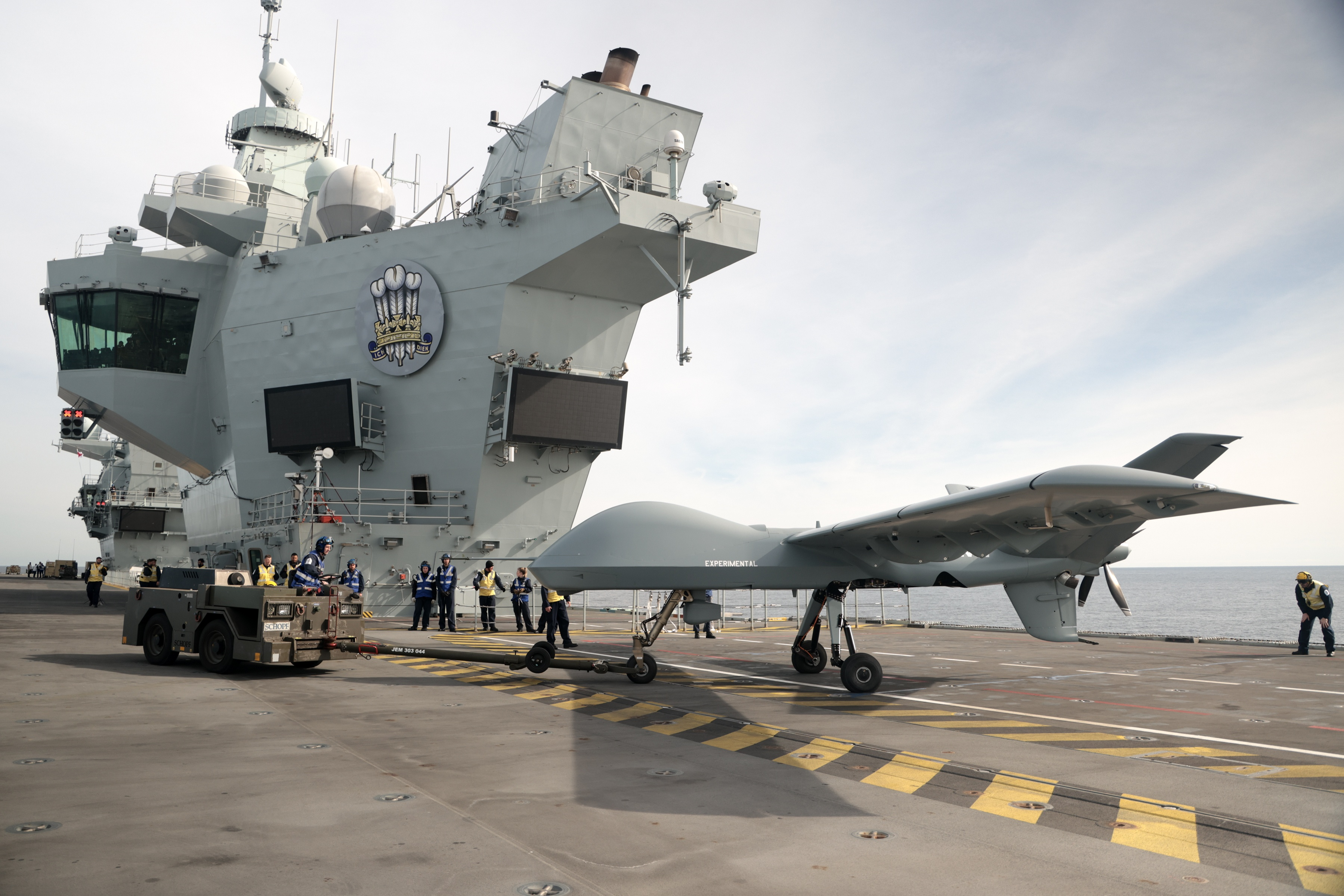
A Mojave UAV aboard HMS Prince of Wales; during trials, the aircraft successfully launched and recovered from the ship.

In September 2023, Prince of Wales began a series of trials with different UAV systems intended for resupply. Once in the Channel the ship's company will conduct trials with UK-firm W Autonomous Systems to assess the feasibility of drones delivering supplies to Royal Navy vessels at sea – initially flying in up to 100kg of stores. W Autonomous WAS platform is a twin-engine light alloy twin boom aircraft capable of carrying a payload of 100kg up to 1000km. Later in the year, the carrier was expected to operate in US waters for broader trials with platforms including the MV-22B Osprey and Mojave UAV.

On 15 November a General Atomics Mojave unmanned aerial vehicle (UAV) took off from and then landed back on board Prince of Wales, with the aircraft carrier situated off the east coast of the United States. This marked a point in time where the Mojave Remotely Piloted Air System (RPAS) drone is the largest uncrewed vehicle to have flown from a non-US Navy carrier. Noted for its short take-off and landing (STOL) capability, the UAV's take-off was conducted at an angle across the flight deck and did not utilise the main ramp. It is expected that the results of these trials will interest many international partners.

=== Exercise Steadfast Defender 2024 ===
On 12 February 2024, Prince of Wales sailed for Norway to participate in Exercise Steadfast Defender replacing HMS Queen Elizabeth which was suffering from an issue with a propeller shaft coupling preventing her from deploying. She embarked F-35B Lightnings from 617 Squadron RAF and AgustaWestland AW159 Wildcat helicopters from 847 Naval Air Squadron. Prince of Wales returned to HMNB Portsmouth on 26 March.

=== Operation Highmast 2025 ===
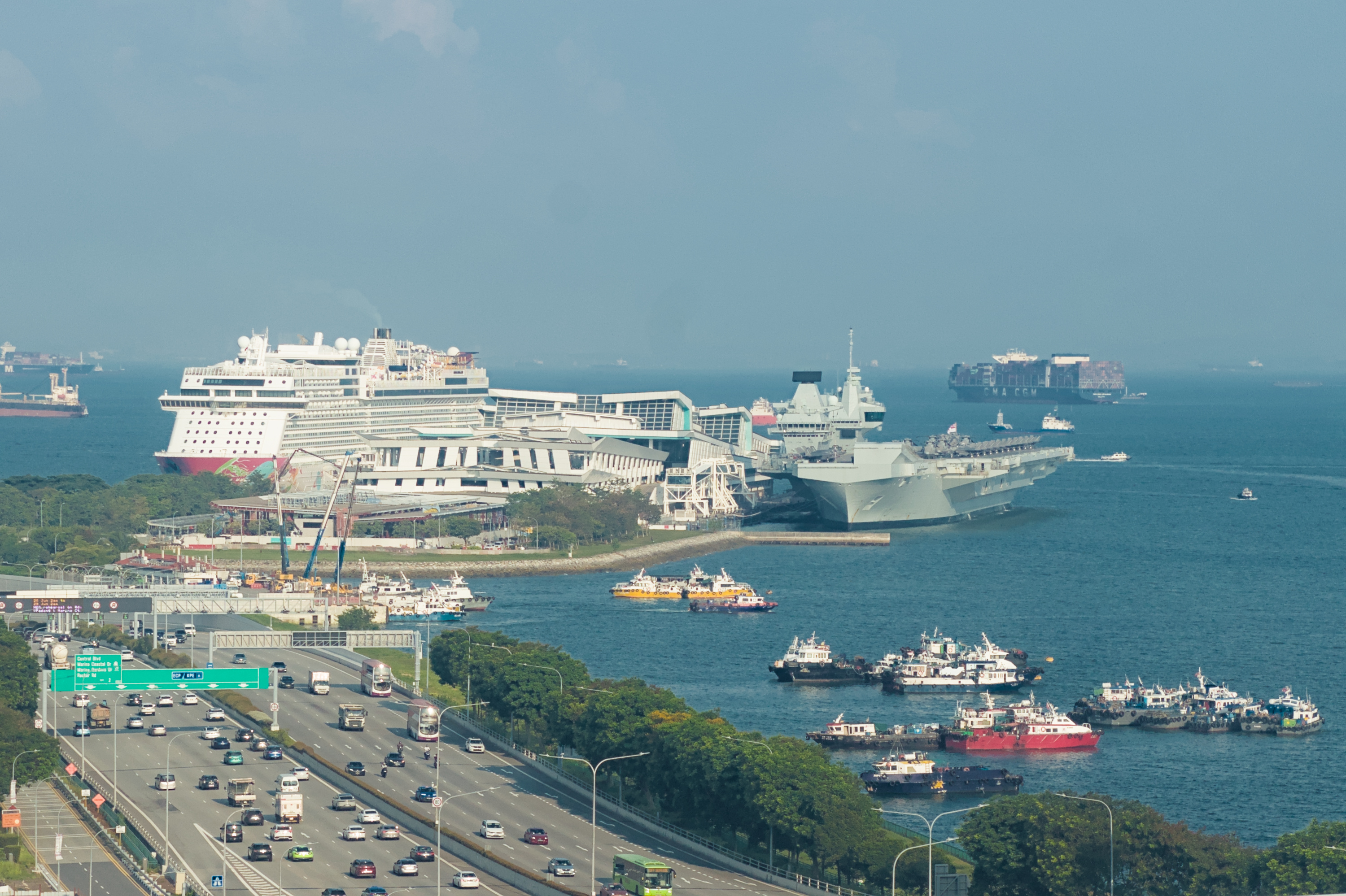
HMS Prince of Wales (R09) berthed at Marina Bay Cruise Centre, Singapore

Prince of Wales led Operation Highmast, an eight month Carrier Strike Group deployment to the Indo-Pacific, planning to sail on 22 April 2025. Norway, Spain and Canada are participating by contributing ships. En-route in the Mediterranean they will participate in the large NATO exercise Neptune Strike 25. They will then sail through the Red Sea crisis area to conduct exercises with India, Singapore, Malaysia and the US.

On 9 and 10 June, the Carrier Strike Group conducted a Passage Exercise (PASSEX) with the Indian Navy which involved INS Tabar, a submarine and a Boeing P-8I Neptune maritime patrol aircraft as well as HMS Prince of Wales and HMS Richmond. The exercises, held in Northern Arabian Sea, showcased synchronised tactical manoeuvres and unified helicopter control operations highlighting the interoperability of the forces.

On 14 June 2025, a Royal Navy F-35B operating from HMS Prince of Wales made an emergency landing at the Thiruvananthapuram International Airport of Kerala, India.

On 24 June 2025, Prince of Wales docked at the Marina Bay Cruise Centre in Singapore.

On returning through Suez at the end of October 2025, the ship docked at Souda Bay, where on 4th November 2025 Captain Will Blackett handed over command to Captain Ben Power.

Operation Highmast concluded on the 30 of November 2025 with the return of the frigate HMS Richmond to Plymouth, and the carrier HMS Prince of Wales together with destroyer HMS Dauntless and Norwegian frigate HNoMS Roald Amundsen to Portsmouth. HMS Prince of Wales entered a post-deployment maintenance period.

=== Operation Firecrest 2026 ===
At the Munich Security Conference on 14 February 2026, Prime Minister Sir Keir Starmer announced the deployment of the UK Carrier Strike Group to the Atlantic and High North in response to increased Russian activity in the North Atlantic, and threats to UK waters with Prince of Wales leading the group. The deployment would involve major exercises with the US, Canada and Northern European allies in the Joint Expeditionary Force, including a visit to a US port. There had been speculation that the ship was being made ready to potentially defend Cyprus in the 2026 Iran war.

On 6 May 2026, Prince of Wales left Defence Munitions Glen Douglas on Loch Long to start the operation. In early June 2026, Prince of Wales extended her port visit to Stavanger, Norway, to resolve a problem that the Royal Navy described as a "minor technical issue".

On 2 July 2026, a Russian Tupolev Tu-142 'Bear Foxtrot' maritime patrol aircraft overflew the carrier group at close quarters and deployed sonobuoys, while being escorted by a pair of F-35Bs from Prince of Wales. The Russian visit occurred as the carrier air wing was readying its F-35Bs for the culmination of the first 'Firecrest' phase, in which it deployed aircraft to support NATO's air policing mission, protecting Icelandic and Arctic airspace against Russian incursions. This was the first time a CSG had contributed to the region's air policing mission.

Prince of Wales' air wing during Firecrest was about 20 aircraft onboard, including F-35Bs, Merlin Mk2 anti-submarine warfare helicopters, and Wildcat HMA Mk2 multi-role helicopters with Malloy Aeronautics T-150B unmanned aerial vehicles (UAVs). During Firecrest the Prince of Wales demonstrated its ability to launch jets, helicopters, and UAVs simultaneously.

== Affiliations ==
- City of Liverpool
- Bristol
- University Royal Naval Unit Bristol
- Worshipful Company of Engineers
- Worshipful Company of Goldsmiths
- Welsh Guards
- Royal Lancers
- No. 27 Squadron RAF
- RNRMC and Greenwich Hospital

== See also ==
- Future of the Royal Navy
