= Queen Elizabeth-class aircraft carrier =

Royal Navy aircraft carrier class

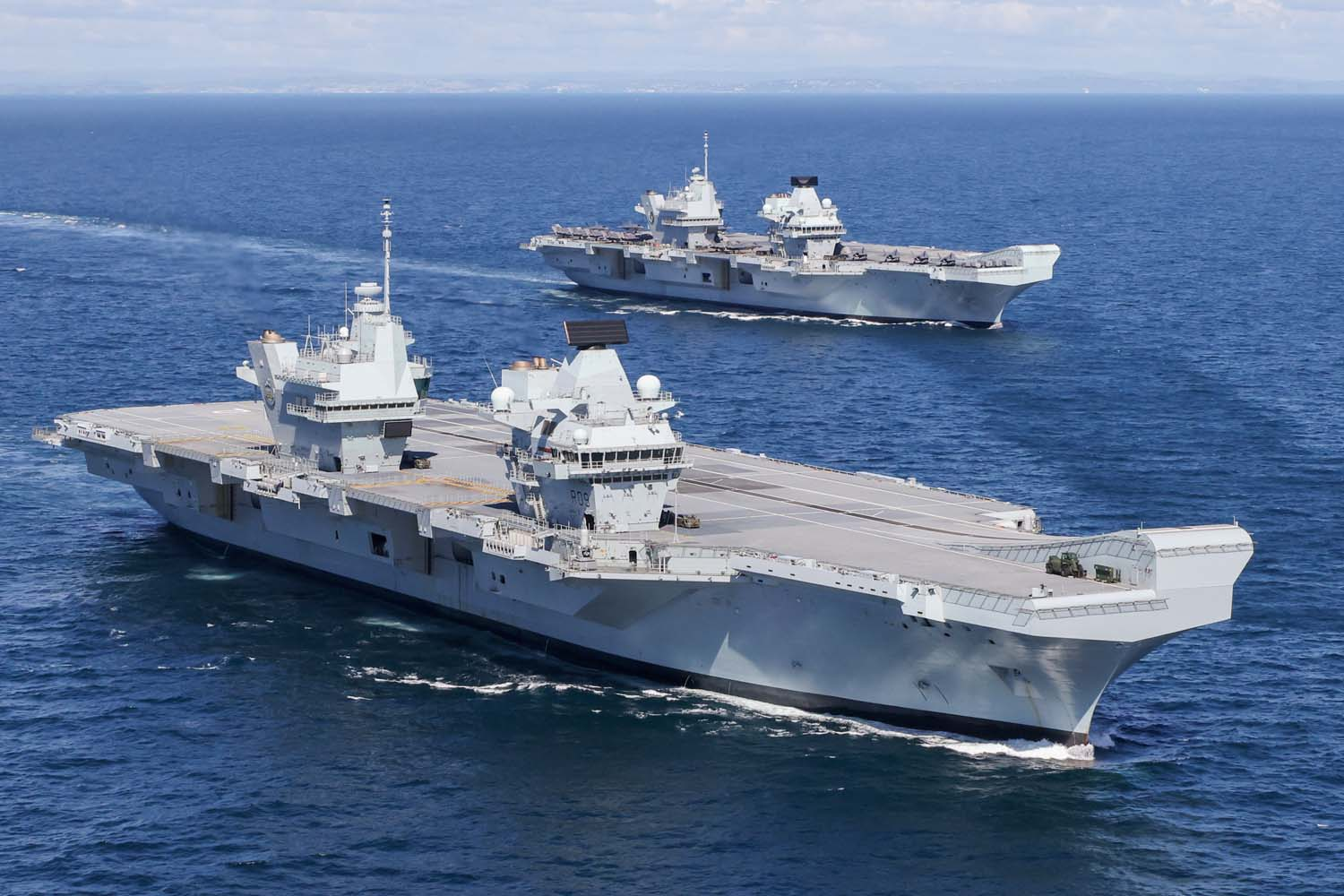
- HMS Prince of Wales (foreground) and HMS Queen Elizabeth (background) on 19 May 2021

Class overview
- Name: Queen Elizabeth class
- Builders: Aircraft Carrier Alliance
- Operators: Royal Navy
- Preceded by: Invincible class
- Cost: £7.6 billion (2019) (equivalent to £9.4 billion in 2024) for two units
- Built: 2009–2017
- In commission: 2017–present
- Completed: 2
- Active: 2

General characteristics
- Type: Aircraft carrier
- Displacement: Est. 80,600 tonnes (79,300 long tons) full load
- Length: 284 m (932 ft)
- Beam: 39 m (128 ft) waterline; 73 m (240 ft) overall
- Draught: 11 m (36 ft)
- Decks: 16,000 m^{2} (170,000 ft^{2}) 9 decks beneath flightdeck with hangar covering the centrepiece of two decks (without islands)
- Installed power: 2 × Rolls-Royce Marine Trent MT30 36 MW (48,000 hp) gas turbine engine; 2 × Wärtsilä 16V38 and 2 x 12V38 marine diesel engines 40 MW (54,000 hp); Total: 118.4 MW (158,800 hp)
- Propulsion: Integrated electric propulsion; 4 × GE Power Conversion 20 MW (27,000 hp) Advanced Induction Motors and VDM25000 drives; 2 × shafts; fixed pitch propellers
- Speed: In excess of 25 knots (46 km/h; 29 mph), tested to 32 knots (59 km/h; 37 mph)
- Range: 10,000 nautical miles (19,000 km; 12,000 mi)
- Troops: 250 to 900
- Complement: 679 crew, not including air element; total berths for up to 1,600
- Sensors & processing systems: S1850M long-range radar; Type 997 Artisan 3D medium range radar; Ultra Electronics Series 2500 Electro Optical System (EOS); Glide path camera (GPC)
- Armament: 3 × 20 mm Phalanx CIWS; 4 × 30-mm DS30M Mk2 guns (for but not with); 6 × 7.62 mm Miniguns (retired in 2023 and replaced by 0.5 inch (12.7 mm) Browning heavy machine guns)
- Aircraft carried: 40 aircraft in peacetime 72 aircraft in wartime; typically, F-35B Lightning (Peacetime max of 36); Chinook; Apache; Merlin HM2, HC4 and Crowsnest AEW; Wildcat AH1 and HMA2
- Aviation facilities: Large flight deck with 12º ski jump; Hangar deck; - 155 m x 34 m x 7 m; Two aircraft lifts; - 27 m x 15 m; - 54,500 kg max load

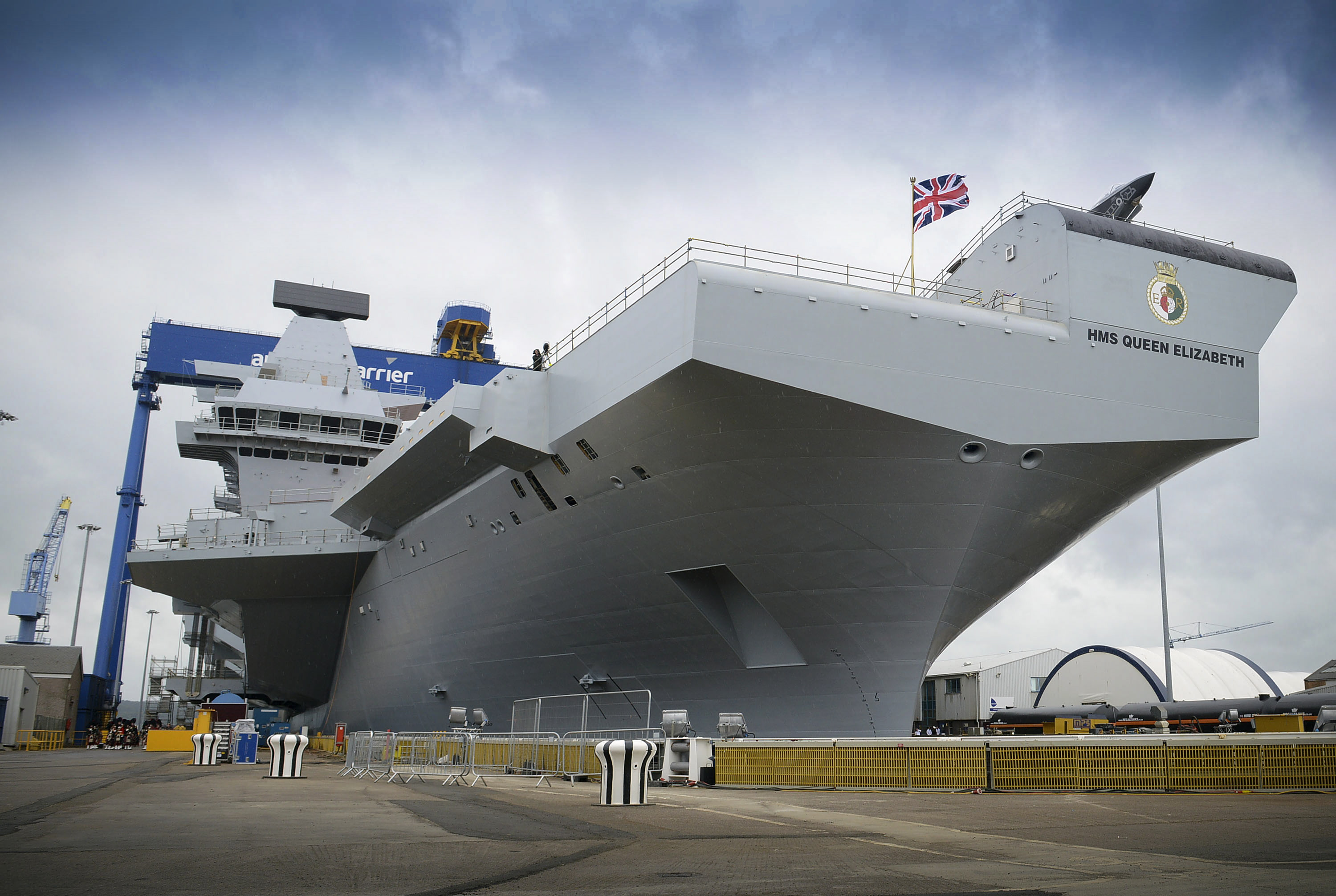
HMS Queen Elizabeth, July 2014

The Queen Elizabeth-class aircraft carriers of the United Kingdom's Royal Navy consists of two vessels. The lead ship of her class, HMS Queen Elizabeth, was named on 4 July 2014 in honour of Elizabeth I and was commissioned on 7 December 2017. Her sister ship, HMS Prince of Wales, was launched on 21 December 2017, and was commissioned on 10 December 2019. They form the central components of the UK Carrier Strike Group.

The contract for the vessels was announced in July 2007, ending several years of delay over cost issues and British naval shipbuilding restructuring. The contracts were signed one year later on 3 July 2008, with the Aircraft Carrier Alliance, a partnership formed with Babcock International, Thales Group, A&P Group, the UK Ministry of Defence and BAE Systems. In 2014 the UK Government announced that the second carrier would be brought into service, ending years of uncertainty surrounding its future. This was confirmed by the Strategic Defence and Security Review 2015, with at least one carrier being available at any time.

The vessels have a full load displacement of an estimated 80,600 tonnes (79,300 long tons); at 284 metres (932 ft) long, they are the largest warships ever constructed for the Royal Navy. The carrier air wing (CVW) will vary depending on the type and location of deployment, but will consist of 12-24 F-35Bs under in peacetime and 36 in a conflict scenario (with up to 48 in extreme cases) and Merlin helicopters to conduct anti-submarine warfare, airborne early warning and utility roles. The projected cost of the programme is £6.2 billion.

The 2010 Strategic Defence and Security Review announced the intention to purchase the Lockheed Martin F-35C "carrier variant" and to build Prince of Wales in a catapult assisted take-off barrier arrested recovery (CATOBAR) configuration. However, in 2012, after projected costs of the CATOBAR system rose to around twice the original estimate, the government announced that it would revert to the original design deploying F-35Bs from short take-off and vertical landing (STOVL) configured carriers.

== Background ==
In May 1997, the newly-elected Labour government led by Tony Blair launched the Strategic Defence Review, which re-evaluated every weapon system, then active or in procurement, with the exception of the Eurofighter Typhoon and the Vanguard-class ballistic missile submarines. The report, published in July 1998, stated that aircraft carriers offer:

- The ability to operate offensive aircraft overseas, when foreign bases may not be available early in a conflict
- All required space and infrastructure, as even where foreign bases are available infrastructure is often lacking
- A coercive and deterrent effect when deployed to a trouble spot

The report concluded: "the emphasis is now on increased offensive airpower, and an ability to operate the largest possible range of aircraft in the widest possible range of roles. When the current carrier force reaches the end of its planned life, we plan to replace it with two larger vessels. Work will now begin to refine our requirements but present thinking suggests that they might be of the order of 30,000–40,000 tonnes and capable of deploying up to 50 aircraft, including helicopters."

=== Design studies ===
Initial Ministry of Defence (MoD) design studies for what was then the Invincible class replacement were conducted in the mid-1990s. Options considered at this early stage included the possibilities of lengthening the hulls and extending the life of the existing Invincible-class ships, converting commercial ships to carriers, and the construction of purpose-built new aircraft carriers.

On 25 January 1999, six companies were invited to tender for the assessment phase of the project – Boeing, British Aerospace (BAe), Lockheed Martin, Marconi Electronic Systems, Raytheon and Thomson-CSF. On 23 November 1999, the MoD awarded detailed assessment studies to two consortia, one led by BAe (renamed BAE Systems on 30 November 1999) and one led by Thomson-CSF (renamed Thales Group in 2000). The brief required up to six designs from each consortium with air-groups of thirty to forty Future Joint Combat Aircraft (FJCA). The contracts were split into phases; the first £5.9 million phase was for design assessment which would form part of the aircraft selection, while the second £23.5 million phase involved "risk reduction on the preferred carrier design option".

In 2005 BMT announced it had tested 4 different CVF hull form models and assessed them for propulsion efficiency, maneuverability, seakeeping and noise signatures. It also investigated skeg length, rudder size, transom stern flaps and bulbous bow designs. The basic Delta concept went through many further iterations and development before the design was considered sufficiently mature by late 2006 for detailed cost estimates to be drawn up prior to ordering long-lead items.

=== Capability requirements and ship size ===
The vessels, described as "supercarriers" by the media, legislators and sometimes by the Royal Navy, have a full load displacement of an estimated 80,600 tonnes (79,300 long tons; 88,800 short tons) each, over three times the displacement of its predecessor, the Invincible class. They are the largest warships ever built in the United Kingdom. The last large carriers proposed for the Royal Navy, the CVA-01 programme, were cancelled by the Labour government in the 1966 Defence White Paper. In November 2004 First Sea Lord Admiral Sir Alan West explained that the sortie rate and interoperability with the United States Navy were factors in deciding on the size of the carriers and the composition of the carriers' air-wings:

to do the initial... deep strike package, we have done really quite detailed calculations and we have come out with the figure of 36 joint strike fighters... That is the thing that has made us arrive at that size of deck and that size of ship... I think it is something like 75 sorties per day over the five-day period... I have talked with the CNO (Chief of Naval Operations) in America [and] He is very keen for us to get these because he sees us slotting in with his carrier groups... but he wants us to have the same sort of clout as one of their carriers, which is this figure at 36 [and] we would mix and match with that.

— Admiral Sir Alan West, evidence to the Select Committee on Defence, 24 November 2004

=== Aircraft and carrier format selection ===
On 17 January 2001, the UK signed a Memorandum of Understanding (MoU) with the United States Department of Defense (DoD) for full participation in the Joint Strike Fighter (JSF) programme, confirming the JSF as the FJCA. This gave the UK input into aircraft design and the choice between the Lockheed Martin X-35 and Boeing X-32. On 26 October 2001, the DoD announced that Lockheed Martin had won the JSF contract.

On 30 September 2002, the MoD announced that the Royal Navy and Royal Air Force would operate the STOVL F-35B variant and that the carriers would take the form of large, conventional carriers, initially adapted for STOVL operations. The carriers, expected to remain in service for fifty years, were designed for but not with catapults and arrestor wires. The carriers were thus planned to be "future proof", allowing them to operate a generation of CATOBAR aircraft beyond the F-35. The contract specified that any conversion would use US C-13 steam catapults and Mark 7 Arresting gear as used by the American Nimitz-class carriers. Four months later on 30 January 2003, the Defence Secretary, Geoff Hoon, announced that the Thales Group design had won the competition but that BAE Systems would operate as prime contractor.

The Secretary of State for Defence announced the intention to proceed with the procurement of the carriers in July 2007. The contracts were officially signed one year later on 3 July 2008, after the creation of BVT Surface Fleet through the merger of BAE Systems Surface Fleet Solutions and VT Group's VT Shipbuilding which was a requirement of the UK Government.

=== Strategic Defence and Security Review 2010 ===
On 19 October 2010, the government announced the results of its Strategic Defence and Security Review (SDSR). The review stated that only one carrier was certain to be commissioned; the fate of the other was left undecided. The second ship of the class could be placed in "extended readiness" to provide a continuous single carrier strike capability when the other was in refit or provide the option to regenerate more quickly to a two carrier strike ability. Alternatively, the second ship could be sold in "cooperation with a close ally to provide continuous carrier-strike capability".

It was also announced that the operational carrier would have catapult and arrestor gear (CATOBAR) installed to accommodate the carrier variant of the F-35 rather than the short-take off and vertical-landing version. It was decided to use the next-generation Electromagnetic Aircraft Launch System (EMALS) catapult and Advanced Arresting Gear (AAG) instead of the more conventional systems which the design had originally been specified to be compatible with.

The decision to convert Prince of Wales to CATOBAR was reviewed after the projected costs rose to around double the original estimate. On 10 May 2012, the Defence Secretary, Philip Hammond, announced in Parliament that the government had decided to revert to its predecessor's plans to purchase the F-35B rather than the F-35C, and to complete both aircraft carriers with ski-jumps in the STOVL configuration. MoD sources indicated that the cost of installing EMALS and AAG on Prince of Wales would have risen to £2 billion, of which about £450 million of which was the cost of the equipment and the remainder the cost of installation. The total cost of the work that had been done on the conversion to a CATOBAR configuration, and of reverting the design to the original STOVL configuration, was estimated by Philip Hammond to be "something in the order of £100 million". In later testimony before a parliamentary committee, Bernard Gray, Chief of Defence Materiel, revealed that even though the carriers had been sold as adaptable and easy to convert for CATOBAR, no serious effort had been made in this direction since 2002.

=== Strategic Defence and Security Review 2015 ===
On 23 November 2015, the government published its 2015 SDSR which confirmed its plans to bring into service both Queen Elizabeth-class aircraft carriers, with one to be available at all times. The review also confirmed that one of the carriers would have enhanced amphibious capabilities. The government also reaffirmed its commitment to ordering 138 F-35 Lightning IIs, although the specific variant(s) was not mentioned. The review stated that 24 of these aircraft would be available to the aircraft carriers by 2023.

=== Future Maritime Aviation Force ===
On 24 May 2023 during the Combined Naval Event 2023 conference in Farnborough 'Project Ark Royal' was announced. This project would "explore the widespread fielding of uncrewed aviation across the surface fleet, with a specific focus on future carrier aviation" The purpose of the project was to enable the operation of high-performance unmanned strike and support systems and potentially fixed-wing aircraft through the phased introduction of aircraft launch and recovery equipment for those types of aircraft. This phased implementation was described by Colonel Phil Kelly, Head of the Royal Navy's Carrier Strike and Maritime Aviation as "moving from STOVL (short take off vertical landing) to STOL (short takeoff and landing), then to STOBAR (short takeoff but arrested recovery) and then to CATOBAR (catapult assisted takeoff but arrested recovery)". These changes would necessitate the eventual installation of catapults, arrestor gear and an angled flight deck as previously envisioned in the 2010 Strategic Defence and Security Review with the carriers having been built for but not with this capability.

== General characteristics ==
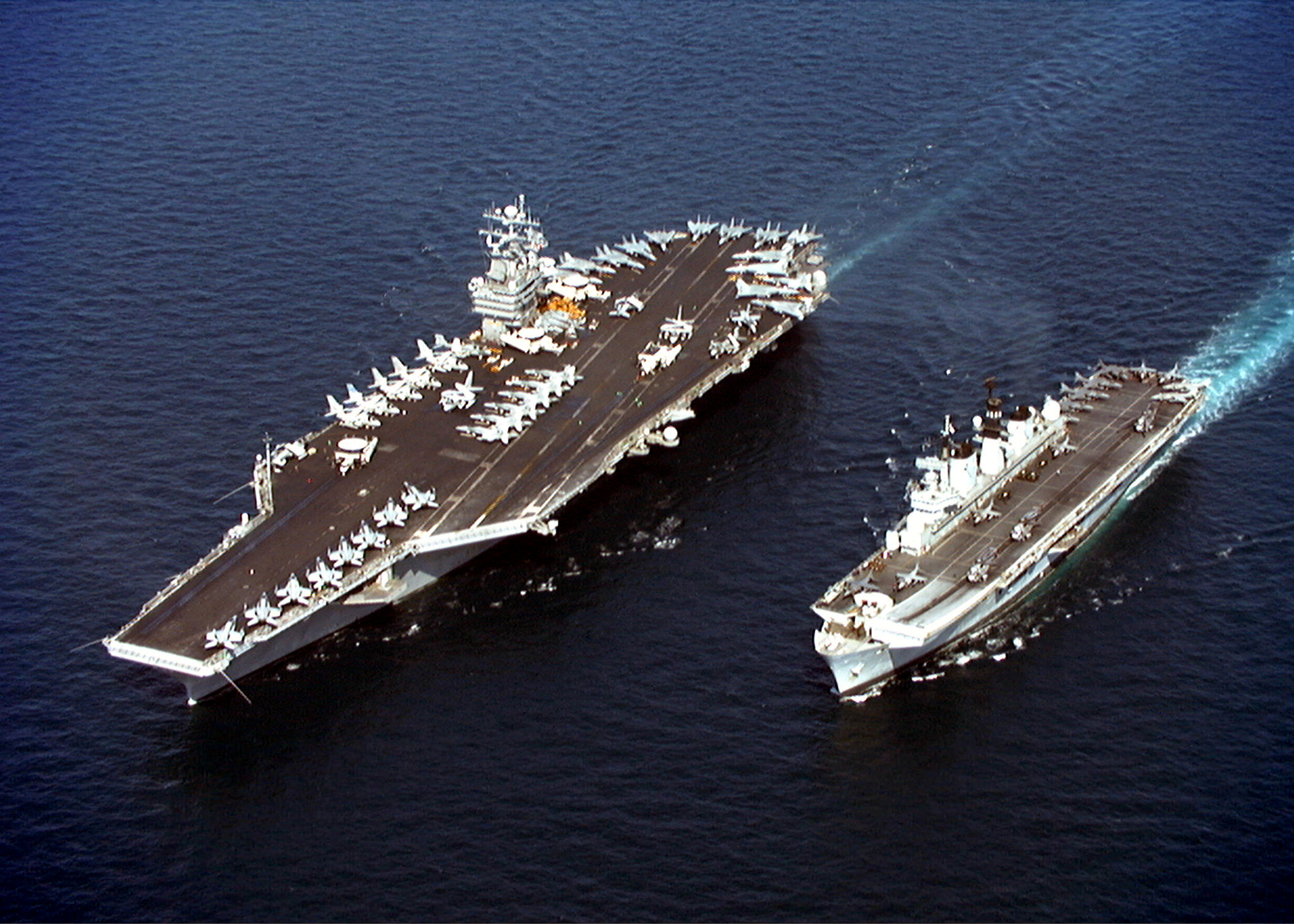
The Queen Elizabeth-class carriers are over three times the displacement of the Invincible-class ships they replace (right) but are 50m shorter and displace approximately 80% of a Nimitz-class carrier (left)

The ships' company is 679, rising to 1,600 when the air crew is added. In April 2015 a parliamentary reply stated that the average crew size would be 672. The ships have an empty load displacement of 65,000 tonnes on delivery, with an estimated full load displacement of 80,600 tonnes as the ships are upgraded through their lifetime. They have an overall length of 284 metres (932 ft), a width of 73 metres (240 ft), a height of 56 metres (184 ft), a draught of 11 metres (36 ft), and a range of 10,000 nautical miles (12,000 mi; 19,000 km). Nuclear propulsion was rejected due to its high cost and manpower required in favour of Integrated Electric Propulsion consisting of two Rolls-Royce Marine Trent MT30 36 MW (48,000 hp) gas turbine generator units and four Wärtsilä diesel generator sets (two 9 MW or 12,000 hp and two 11 MW or 15,000 hp). The Trents and diesels are the largest ever supplied to the Royal Navy, and together they feed the low-voltage electrical systems as well as four GE Power Conversion's 20 MW electric propulsion motors that drive the twin fixed-pitch propellers.

Instead of a single island superstructure containing both the ships' navigation bridges and flying control (FLYCO) centres, the ships have these operations divided between two structures, with the forward island for navigation and the aft island for controlling flying operations. The primary reason for having twin islands was to space out the funnels, as the ships were designed with redundancy with "duplicated main and secondary machinery in two complexes with independent uptakes and downtakes in each of the two islands", while the alternative of consolidating all the exhaust trunkings would have reduced hangar space as well as increasing the vulnerability to flooding. Additional benefits include easier construction, reduced wind turbulence, and freed up deck space. Using two structures provides separate mountings for the air surveillance radar (forward), which does not interfere with the medium-range radar (aft); furthermore, visibility is improved for both navigation and landing operations.

Under the flight deck are a further nine decks. The hangar deck measures 155 by 33.5 metres (509 by 110 ft) with a height of 6.7 to 10 metres (22 to 33 ft), large enough to accommodate up to twenty fixed and rotary wing aircraft. To transfer aircraft from the hangar to the flight deck, the ships have two large lifts, each of which is capable of lifting two F-35Bs or one CH-47 Chinook from the hangar to the flight deck in sixty seconds. The ships' only announced self-defence weapons are currently the Phalanx CIWS for airborne threats and Browning .50 caliber heavy machine guns. The Queen Elizabeth class provides for four 30mm DS30M Mark 2 Automated Small Calibre Guns to counter seaborne threats, but these had not been fitted as of 2021.

=== Systems ===
The ship's radars are the BAE Systems/Thales S1850M for long-range wide-area search, the BAE Systems Artisan 3D Type 997 maritime medium-range active electronically scanned array radar, and a navigation radar. BAE claims the S1850M has a fully automatic detection and track initiation that can track up to 1,000 air targets at a range of around 400 kilometres (250 mi). Artisan can "track a target the size of a snooker ball over 20 kilometres (12 mi) away", with a maximum range of 200 km. They will also be fitted with the Ultra Electronics Series 2500 Electro Optical System (EOS) and Glide Path Camera (GPC).

Munitions and ammunition handling is accomplished using a Babcock designed highly mechanised weapons handling system (HMWHS). This is the first naval application of a common land-based warehouse system. The HMWHS moves palletised munitions from the magazines and weapon preparation areas, along trackways and via several lifts, forward and aft or port and starboard. The tracks can carry a pallet to magazines, the hangar, weapons preparation areas, and the flight deck. In a change from normal procedures the magazines are unmanned, the movement of pallets is controlled from a central location, and manpower is only required when munitions are being initially stored or prepared for use. This system speeds up delivery and reduces the size of the crew by automation.

=== Crew facilities ===
Crew facilities include a cinema, five physical fitness areas (gyms), a chapel (with embarked naval chaplain), and four galleys manned by sixty-seven catering staff. There are four large dining areas, the largest with the capacity to serve 960 meals in one hour. There are eleven medical staff for the eight-bed medical facility, which includes an operating theatre and a dental surgery. There are 1,600 bunks in 470 cabins, including accommodation for a company of 250 Royal Marines with wide access routes up to the flight deck.

== Carrier air group ==
Only one carrier has a carrier air wing embarked at any time. In peacetime, 12–24 F-35Bs will be embarked. This will rise to 36 F-35Bs during combat operations, with the ability to operate 48 in extreme circumstances. The ships have a sortie generation rate of up to 110 per day. Fourteen Merlin HM2 will be available with typically nine in anti-submarine configuration and four or five with Crowsnest for airborne early warning; alternatively a "littoral manoeuvre" package could include a mix of Royal Navy Commando Helicopter Force Merlin HC4, Wildcat AH1, RAF Chinook transports, and Army Air Corps Apache attack helicopters. As of September 2013 six landing spots are planned, but the deck could be marked out for the operation of ten medium helicopters at once, allowing the lift of a company of 250 troops. The hangars are designed for operating Chinooks without blade folding and the Bell Boeing V-22 Osprey tiltrotor; the two aircraft lifts can each accommodate a Chinook with unfolded blades.

In November 2023, the Royal Navy explored using of UAVs and UCAVs. The General Atomics Mojave UAV was successfully launched and recovered from HMS Prince of Wales, the first time a fixed wing RPAS had done so.

=== Fixed-wing aircraft ===
Although the size of the Queen Elizabeth class would enable it to accommodate most carrier-based fixed-wing aircraft, the lack of arresting gear means that, as initially completed, it is only capable of operating either STOVL aircraft, such as F-35B Lightning, tiltrotors such as the Osprey, or aircraft that do not require either catapult-assisted take-off or arrested recovery.

==== F-35 Lightning II ====
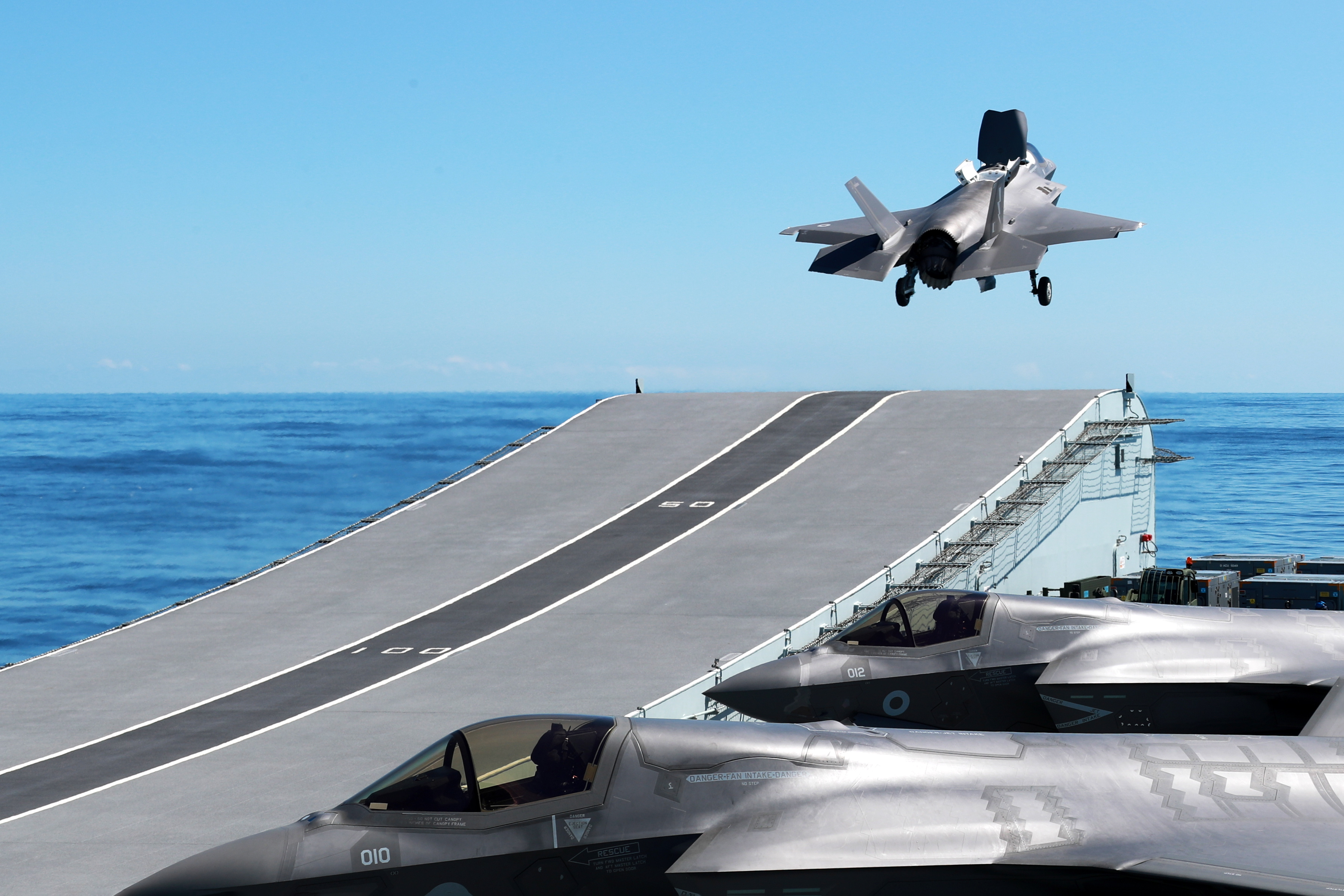
F-35B of 617 Squadron takes off from a ski-jump during Carrier Sea Training in 2020

With the retirement of the Harrier GR7 and GR9 in 2010, there remained no carrier-capable fixed-wing aircraft available to the Royal Navy or Royal Air Force. Their replacement is the Lockheed Martin F-35 Lightning II.

After the 2010 SDSR Review the government intended to purchase the F-35C carrier variant and modify one carrier to use the CATOBAR system to launch and recover these aircraft. This was because the cheaper F-35C variant has a greater range and can carry a larger and more diverse payload than the F-35B. On 10 May 2012 the Defence Secretary Philip Hammond announced in Parliament that the government had decided to revert to its predecessor's plans to purchase the F-35B rather than the F-35C, and to abandon the completion of Prince of Wales in a CATOBAR configuration. The reason given was that "conversion to 'cats and traps' will cost about double what was originally estimated – and would not be delivered until 2023 at the earliest". Although the F-35B is fully capable of performing vertical landing, in a similar fashion to the way that the Harrier and Sea Harrier operated, this method of operation places limitations on the loads that the aircraft is capable of returning to the ship with. As a consequence, to avoid the costly disposal at sea of both fuel and munitions, the Royal Navy is developing the Shipborne rolling vertical landing (SRVL) technique for its operation of the Lightning II. SRVL is a hybrid landing technique that uses the Lightning's vectored thrust capability to slow its forward speed to around 70 knots to allow it to make a rolling landing, using its disc brakes, without the need of an arrestor wire. A special type of metallic 'thermal paint' is being developed to withstand temperatures of up to 1,500 °C in the vicinity of jet nozzles.

On 19 July 2012, Hammond indicated in a speech in the United States that the UK would order an initial 48 F-35B aircraft to be operated jointly by the Royal Air Force and Fleet Air Arm. In November 2015, the government announced its commitment to an order of 138 F-35 aircraft, with 24 available for carrier duties by 2023. The 2021 defence white paper sharply reduced the envisaged total number of aircraft to be purchased to "beyond 48". Subsequently, the First Sea Lord indicated that the new envisaged number was to be 60 aircraft initially and "then maybe more", up to a maximum of around 80 to hopefully equip four "deployable squadrons". In April 2022, the Deputy Chief of Defence Staff, Air Marshal Richard Knighton, told the House of Commons Defence Select Committee that the MoD was in discussions to purchase a second tranche of 26 F-35B fighters. Subsequent reports suggested that this second tranche order would only be completed in 2033.

Plans for frontline F-35B squadrons had been modified and now envisaged a total of three squadrons (rather than four) each deploying 12 to 16 aircraft. In surge conditions 24 F-35s might be deployed on a carrier but a routine deployment would likely involve 12 aircraft.

In December 2016, the British Government announced that it reached an agreement with the United States to allow the deployment of USMC F-35s from Queen Elizabeth upon the ship's entry into service, with a reciprocal arrangement seeing RAF and FAA aircraft operating from ships of the US Navy.

Currently, UK F-35B's are set to be integrated with a number of UK weapon systems. MBDA's Advanced Short-Range Air-to-Air Missile (ASRAAM) and long range Meteor missiles will be used for air-to-air engagements. Up-to two ASRAAMs can be carried on the outermost external weapon stations, whilst up-to four Meteors can be carried internally when in a stealth configuration, with mock-ups showing an additional four meteors can be mounted externally in a 'Beast Mode' configuration. For air-to-surface missions, an F-35B can carry up-to six Raytheon UK Paveway IV 500lb guided bombs with two bombs mounted internally, or eight 140+ km ranged SPEAR 3 cruise missiles (it is not yet known if SPEAR can/will be externally mounted on the F-35B). It has not been confirmed if the F-35B will be integrated with the upcoming French-British-Italian Future Cruise / Anti-Ship Weapon(s).

=== Helicopters ===
==== Wildcat ====
The AgustaWestland AW159 is a medium-sized, twin-engine, multi-role helicopter and a development of the Westland Lynx. Known as the 'Wildcat', it is in service with both the British Army as the Wildcat MK1 and the Royal Navy as the Wildcat HMA2 (or HMA Mk2). The Royal Navy's first Wildcat HMA2 entered service on 23 March 2015. The HM2 maritime variant is optimised for surface warfare and can be armed with up-to 20x Martlet multi-role missiles or up-to 4x Sea Venom anti-ship missiles or machine guns; alternatively, Sting Ray lightweight torpedoes and depth charges may be carried for anti-submarine duties. These weapons are supported by an array of sensors such as the Seaspray 7400E AESA radar, MX-15Di electro-optical/FLIR camera and various radar and missile warning systems. The aircraft has a maximum range of 520 nautical miles (960 km; 600 mi) and an endurance of four and a half hours.

The nature of the Wildcat's role is more likely to see it deployed on board a carrier's escort vessels rather than a carrier itself.

==== Merlin ====
The AgustaWestland AW101 is a family of medium-sized, three-engined, multi-role helicopters. Two versions are in service with the UK Armed Forces, where it is known as the 'Merlin'. The Merlin Mk4 or 'Commando Merlin' is designed to carry up to twenty-four troops seated or sixteen stretcher patients and focuses on conducting utility missions such as troop insertions, whilst the Merlin Mk2 or HM2 anti-submarine warfare variant is fitted with a dipping sonar and sonar-buoy dispensers, and a complete electronic warfare suite; additionally it can be mounted with the Crowsnest airborne surveillance and control kit.

Both versions use a common airframe. Their range and endurance using only a two engine cruise option is 750 nautical miles (1,390 km; 860 mi), or six hours. However, range can be extended further when the five underfloor fuel tanks are supplemented with auxiliary fuel tanks fitted in the cabin. Armament depends on the mission but includes anti-ship missiles, torpedoes, door-mounted machine guns, multi-purpose rocket, cannon pods, air-to-air missiles and air-to-surface missiles. Currently, Royal Navy's Merlin Mk2 fleet is only integrated with Sting Ray lightweight torpedoes and depth charges, and both the Mk2 and Mk4 can be equipped with machine guns. It was initially anticipated that at least 14 Merlin HM2s would be assigned to the carrier. However, in practice with just 30 Merlin HM2s in service, it may be impossible to deploy 14 aircraft on a single operational carrier on a full-time basis. During the 2021 carrier strike group deployment to the Pacific, for instance, considerably fewer than 14 Merlins were embarked with the task group, while during the 2023 "Operation FIREDRAKE" deployment, only five Merlins (along with three Wildcats and eight F-35Bs) were embarked on the carrier.

=== Airborne early warning and control ===
The 1982 Falklands War made clear the importance of airborne early warning and control and led to the development of the Sea King AEW2, which was succeeded by the Sea King ASaC7. This was scheduled to be retired in the second half of 2018 and planning for its replacement was identified at an early stage as an integral part of the next-generation aircraft carrier. The programme became known as the "Future Organic Airborne Early Warning" (FOAEW), and contracts were placed with BAE / Northrop Grumman and Thales in April 2001. In April 2002, BAE and Northrop Grumman received a follow-on study contract for Phase II of the project, by then renamed Maritime Airborne Surveillance and Control (MASC). The MASC assessment phase began in September 2005 and by May 2006 three study contracts were awarded for MASC platform and mission systems options: one to Lockheed Martin UK for a Merlin helicopter fitted with AEW mission systems, another to AgustaWestland to maintain the present Sea King ASaC7 and finally to Thales UK to upgrade the Sea King's mission systems.

The 2010 SDSR delayed the project which became a competition between Thales and Lockheed to supply Crowsnest, a bolt-on sensor package that can be carried by any Merlin HM2. The Thales pod is based on the Sea King's Searchwater 2000; Lockheed had intended to use a derivative of the F-35's APG-81 radar but is now believed to be using an Elta system. Both systems were scheduled to begin flight trials in the summer of 2014 ahead of Main Gate in 2016. Ten pods were planned with IOC in 2019, but that was later changed to late-2021, and then (subsequently) to the second quarter of 2023. A small force of Sea King ASaC.7 helicopters had been kept in service with 849 Naval Air Squadron after the final withdrawal of the remainder of the Royal Navy's Sea Kings, but these aircraft were withdrawn from service in September 2018. As part of the process of the system reaching initial operating capability, Crowsnest was deployed on the first Merlin helicopters in March 2021. However, the system experienced operating challenges. Initial operating capability of the system was achieved in July 2023 and full operating capability in April 2025. It has been reported that initially five Merlins will be equipped with Crowsnest, three of these being normally assigned to the "high readiness" aircraft carrier. During its 2023 "Operation FIREDRAKE" deployment, two of five Merlins embarked on Queen Elizabeth were in the AEW configuration.

=== Other aircraft ===
In March 2021, it emerged that the Royal Navy was considering fitting its Queen Elizabeth-class aircraft carriers with electromagnetic catapults and arrestor cables to launch and recover non-STOVL aircraft. An MOD-issued Request for Information (RFI) specified a need for a system capable of launching a maximum weight of 24,948 kilograms (55,001 lb) and recovering a maximum weight of 21,319 kilograms (47,000 lb) for installation within three–five years. Whilst these weight limits mean it is unable to launch and recover large conventional aircraft, like the F-35C, the system will be able to launch and recover unmanned combat air vehicles (UCAVs). During the same month, it emerged that the Royal Navy was undertaking conceptual work on a carrier-borne UAV under Project Vixen. The Royal Navy plans to operate these UAVs in strike, electronic warfare, air-to-air refueling and airborne early warning roles, replacing some helicopter-based platforms, including Merlin Crowsnest. In May 2023, the UK announced a contract to trial a General Atomics Mojave short-take off and landing UAV aboard Prince of Wales. These trials took place in November 2023 off the coast of the United States and saw the aircraft successfully launched and recovered. In September 2023, an Autonomous Systems W drone was also trialed for carrier onboard delivery.

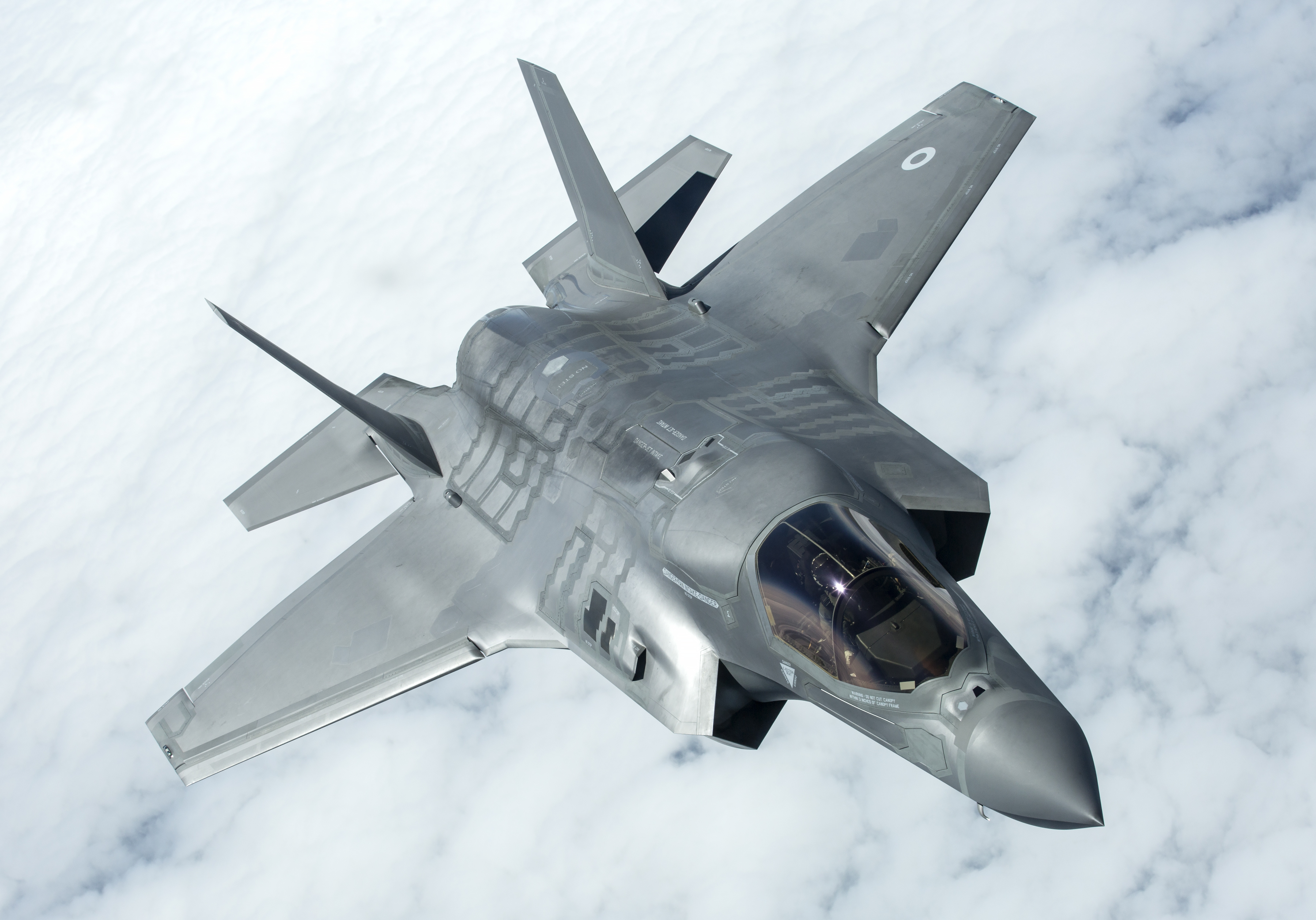
F-35B Lightning II

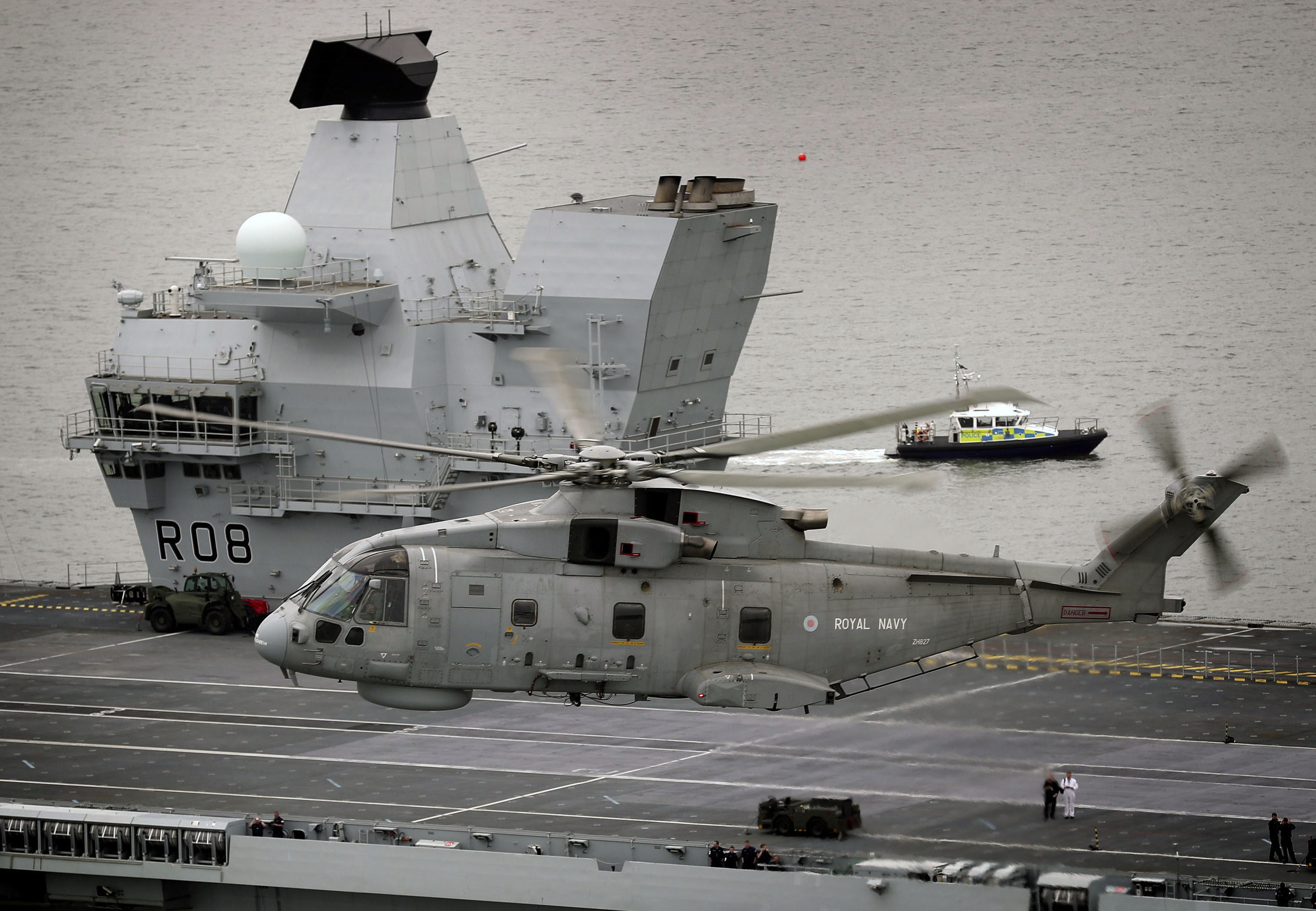
A Merlin Mk2 flying alongside Queen Elizabeth

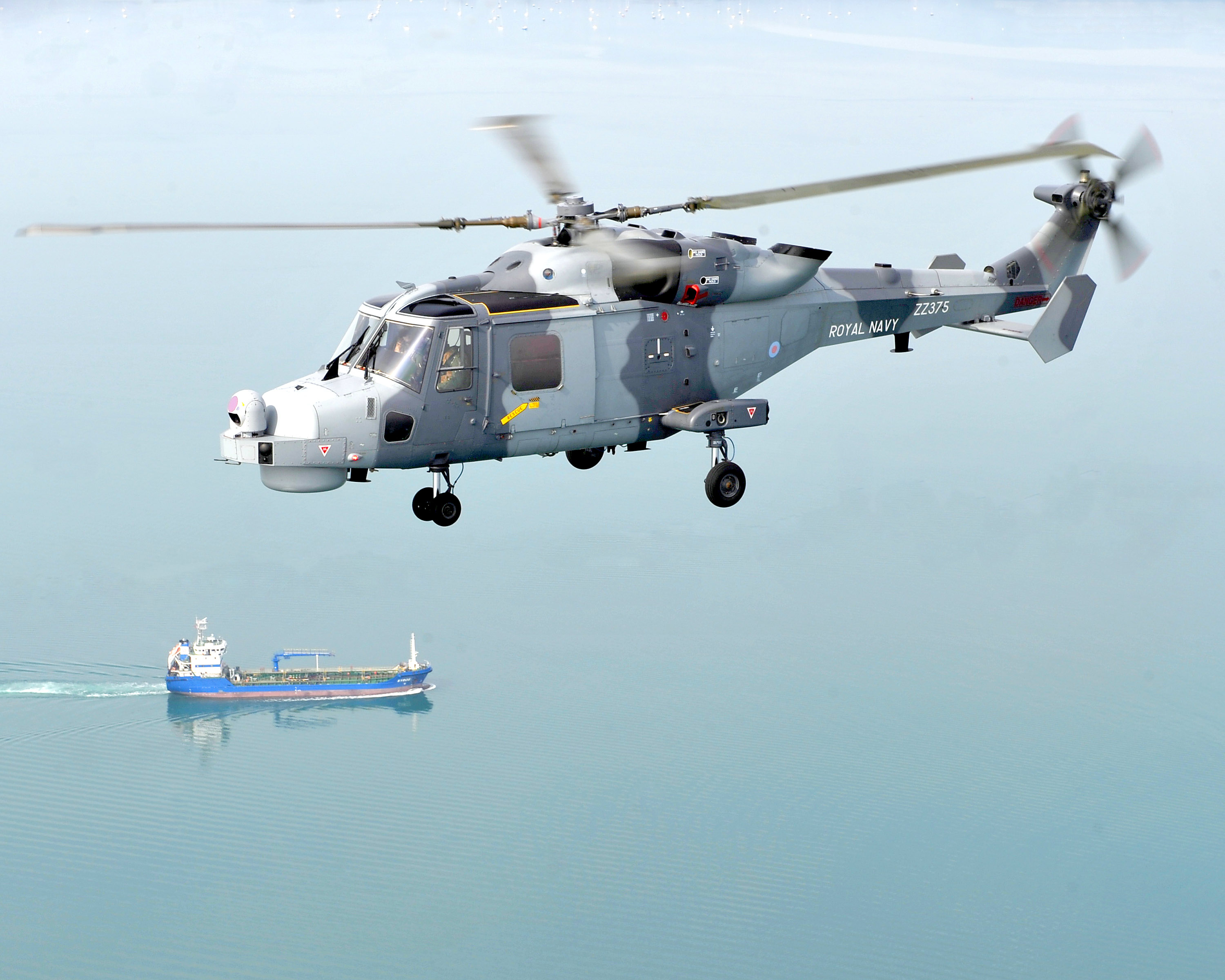
Wildcat HM2 operating over the English Channel

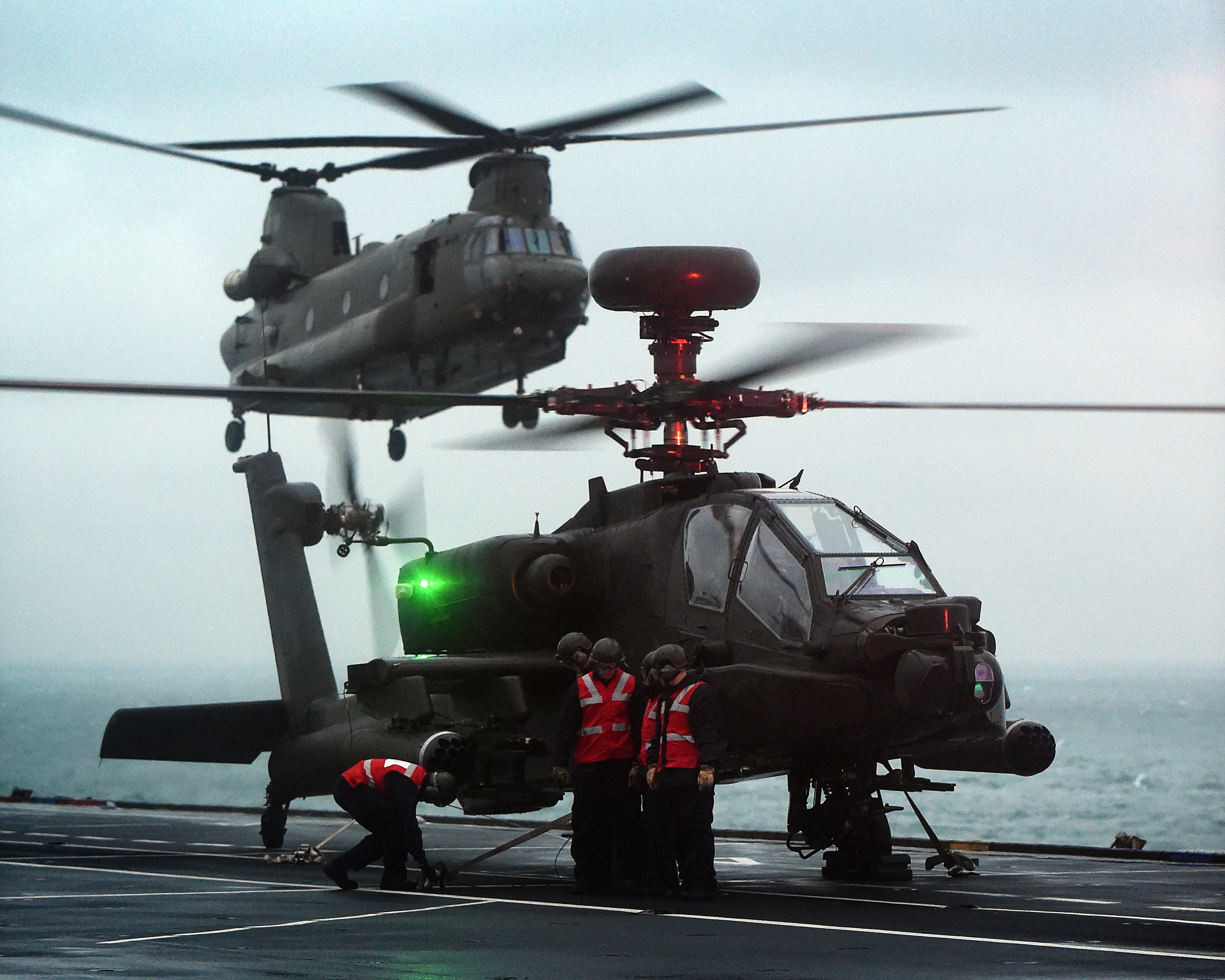
Apache and Chinook at sea on HMS Ocean

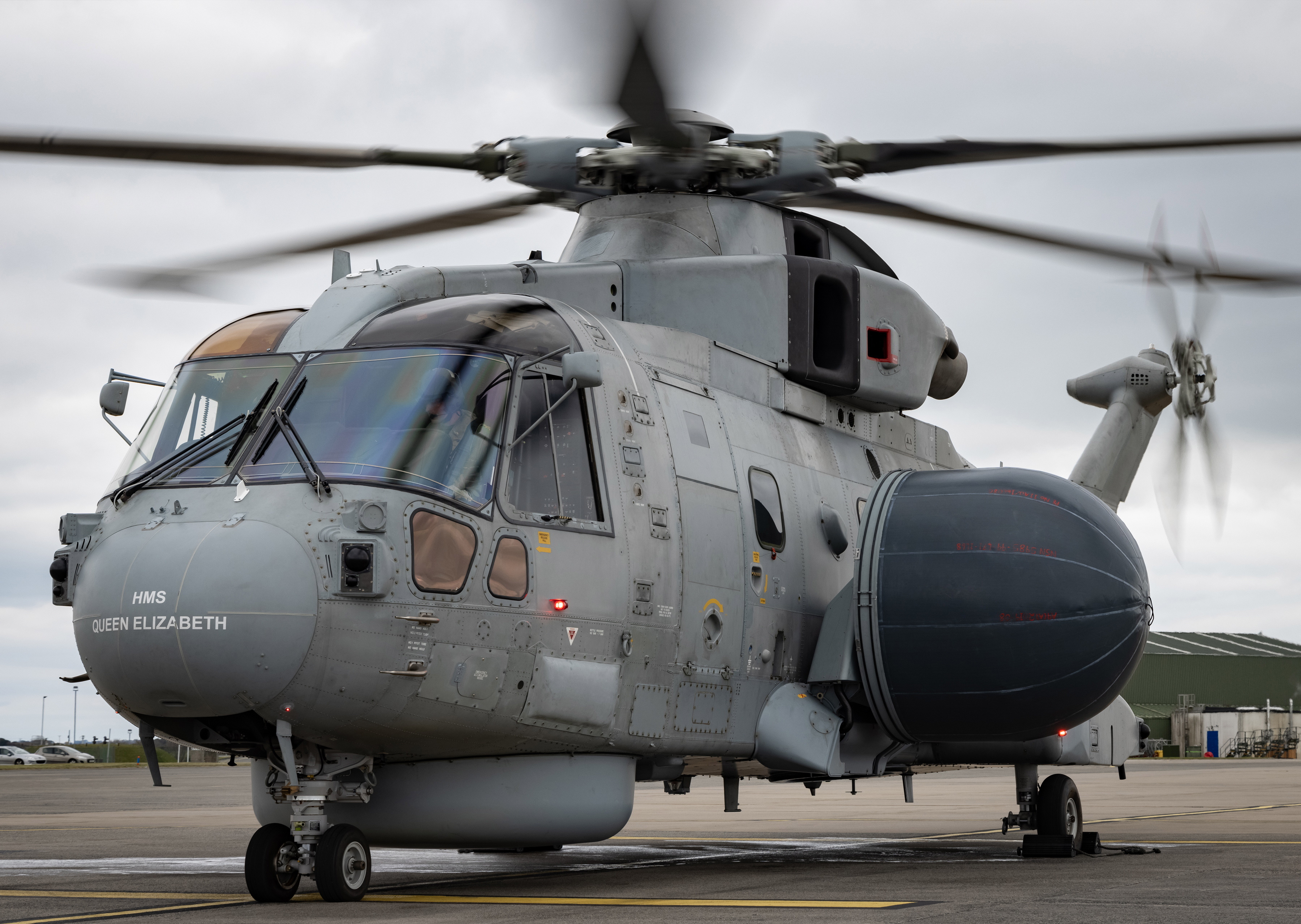
A Merlin HM2 Crowsnest

== Construction ==
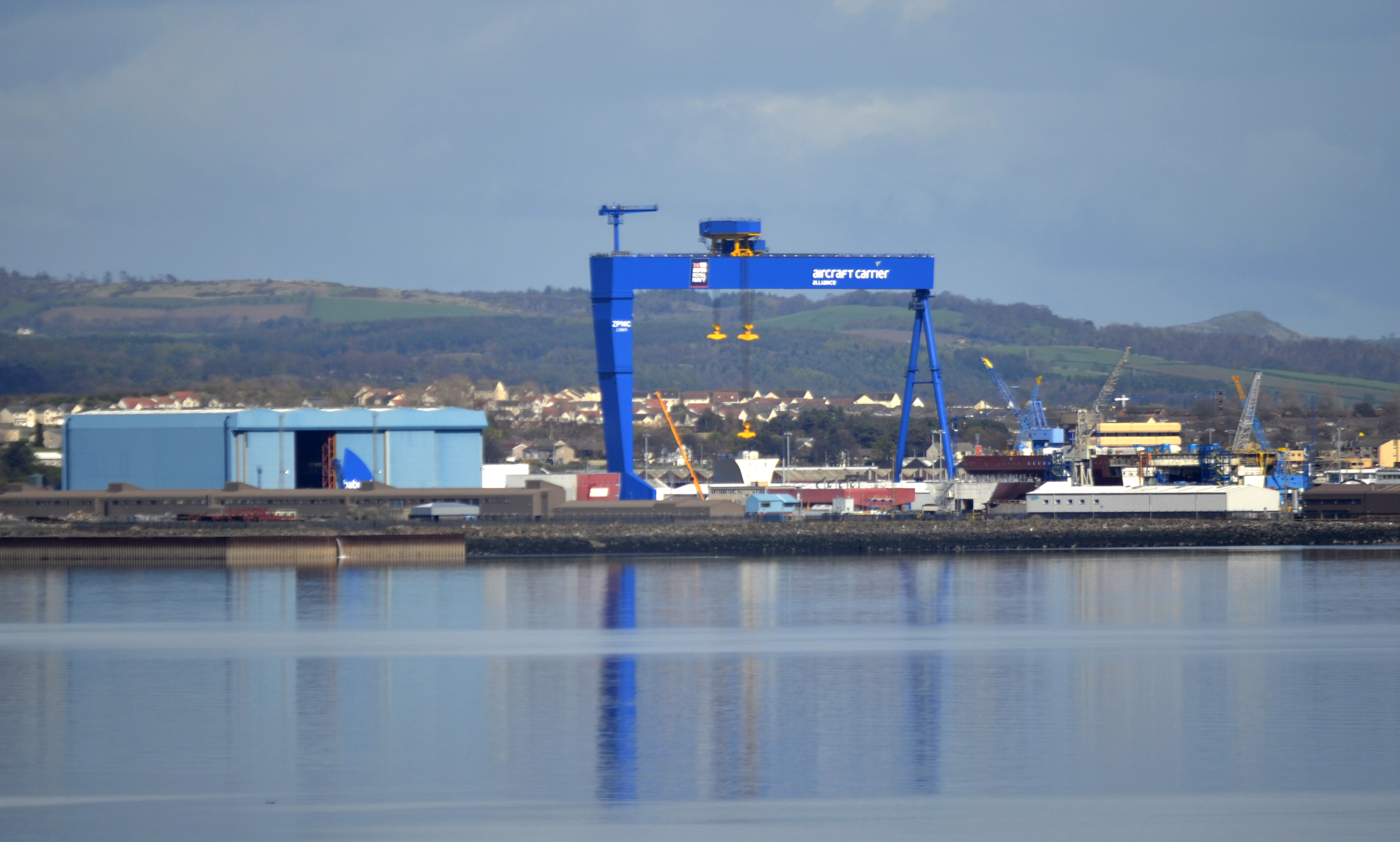
Dockyard cranes at Rosyth viewed from across the Firth of Forth.

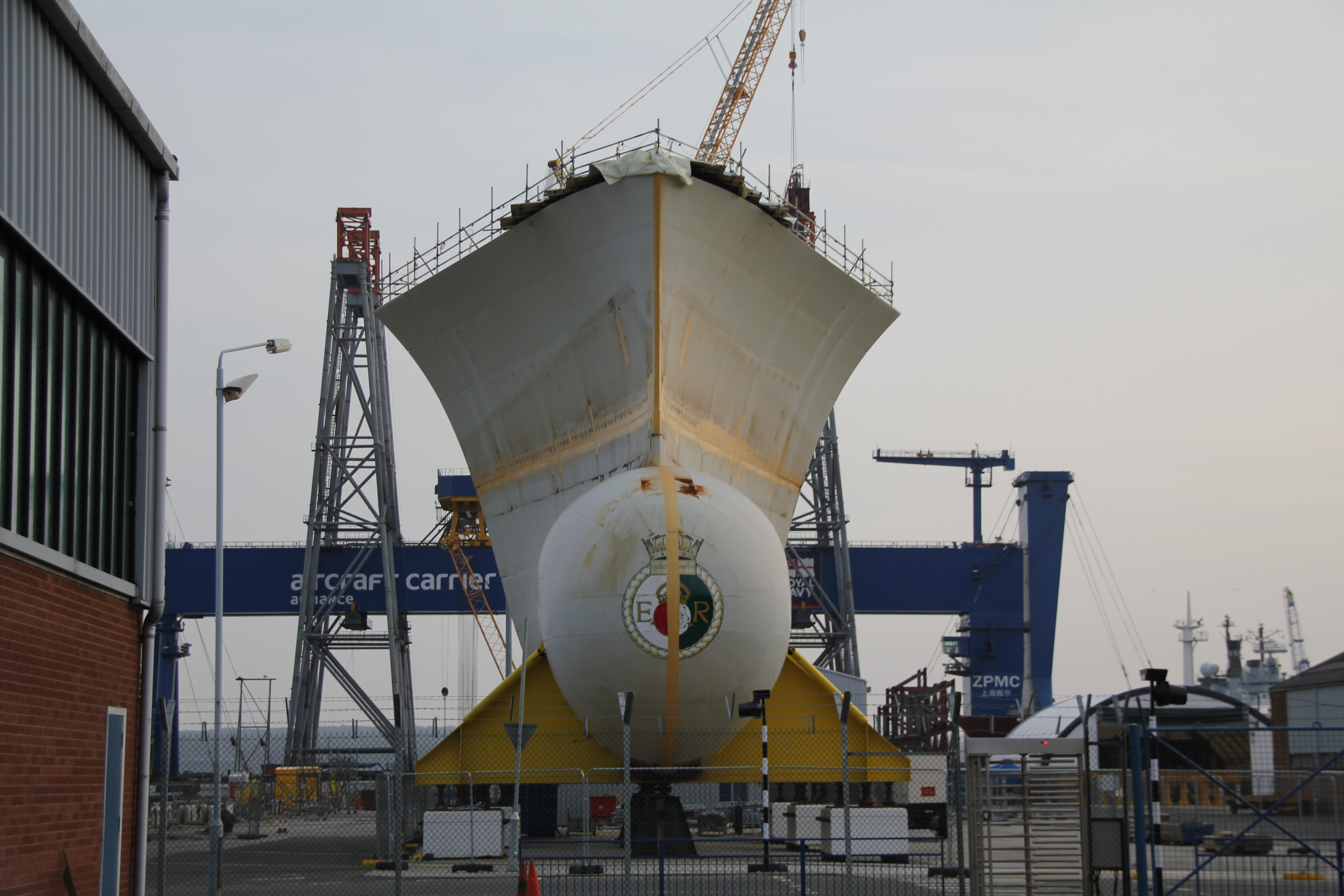
Lower section of Lower Block 1 (bulbous bow) of HMS Queen Elizabeth at Rosyth

During a speech on 21 July 2004, Geoff Hoon announced a one-year delay to allow contractual and cost issues to be resolved. The building of the carriers was confirmed in December 2005. The building was undertaken by four companies across seven shipyards, with final block integration and assembly at Rosyth:

- BAE Systems Surface Ships – Govan (Lower Blocks 3 and 4), Scotstoun (aft island) and Portsmouth (Lower Blocks 2, 5 and forward island)
- Babcock Marine – Rosyth (Sponsons, Mast and Centre Blocks 5 and 6) and Appledore (Lower Block 1)
- A&P Group – Hebburn (Centre Block 3)
- Cammell Laird – Birkenhead (Centre Blocks 2 and 4)

In December 2007, eight diesel engines and electricity generators, four for each ship, were ordered from Wärtsilä. On 4 March 2008, contracts for the supply of 80,000 tonnes of steel were awarded to Corus Group, with an estimated value of £65 million. Other contracts included £3 million for fibre optic cable, over £1 million for reverse osmosis equipment to provide over 500 tonnes of fresh water daily, and £4 million for aviation fuel systems. On 3 April 2008, a contract for the manufacture of aircraft lifts (worth £13m) was awarded to MacTaggart Scott of Loanhead, Scotland.

In mid May 2008, the Treasury announced that it would be making available further funds on top of the regular defence budget, reportedly allowing the construction of the carriers to begin. This was followed, on 20 May 2008, by the government giving the "green light" for construction of the Queen Elizabeth class, stating that it was ready to sign the contracts for full production once the creation of the planned shipbuilding joint venture between BAE Systems and the VT Group had taken place. This joint venture, BVT Surface Fleet, became operational on 1 July 2008. VT Group later sold its share to BAE Systems which renamed the unit BAE Systems Surface Ships. It undertook approximately forty per cent of the project workload.

On 1 September 2008, the MoD announced a £51 million package of important equipment contracts; £34 million for the highly mechanised weapons handling system for the two ships, £8 million for supply of uptake and down-take systems for both ships, £5 million for air traffic control software, £3 million for supply of pumps and associated systems engineering, and £1 million for emergency diesel generators. On 6 October 2008, it was announced that contracts had been placed for "the carriers' Rolls-Royce gas turbines, generators, motors, power distribution equipment, platform management systems, propellers, shafts, steering gear, rudders and stabilisers".

The construction of the two carriers involves more than 10,000 people from 90 companies, 7,000 of them in the six shipyards building the sections of the ships.

=== Ships ===
Name	Pennant	Builders	Ordered	Laid down	Launched (floated)	Commissioned	Status
Queen Elizabeth	R08	Aircraft Carrier Alliance, Rosyth Dockyard	20 May 2008	7 July 2009	17 July 2014	7 December 2017	Active in service
Prince of Wales	R09	Aircraft Carrier Alliance, Rosyth Dockyard	20 May 2008	26 May 2011	21 December 2017	10 December 2019	Active in service

==== Queen Elizabeth ====
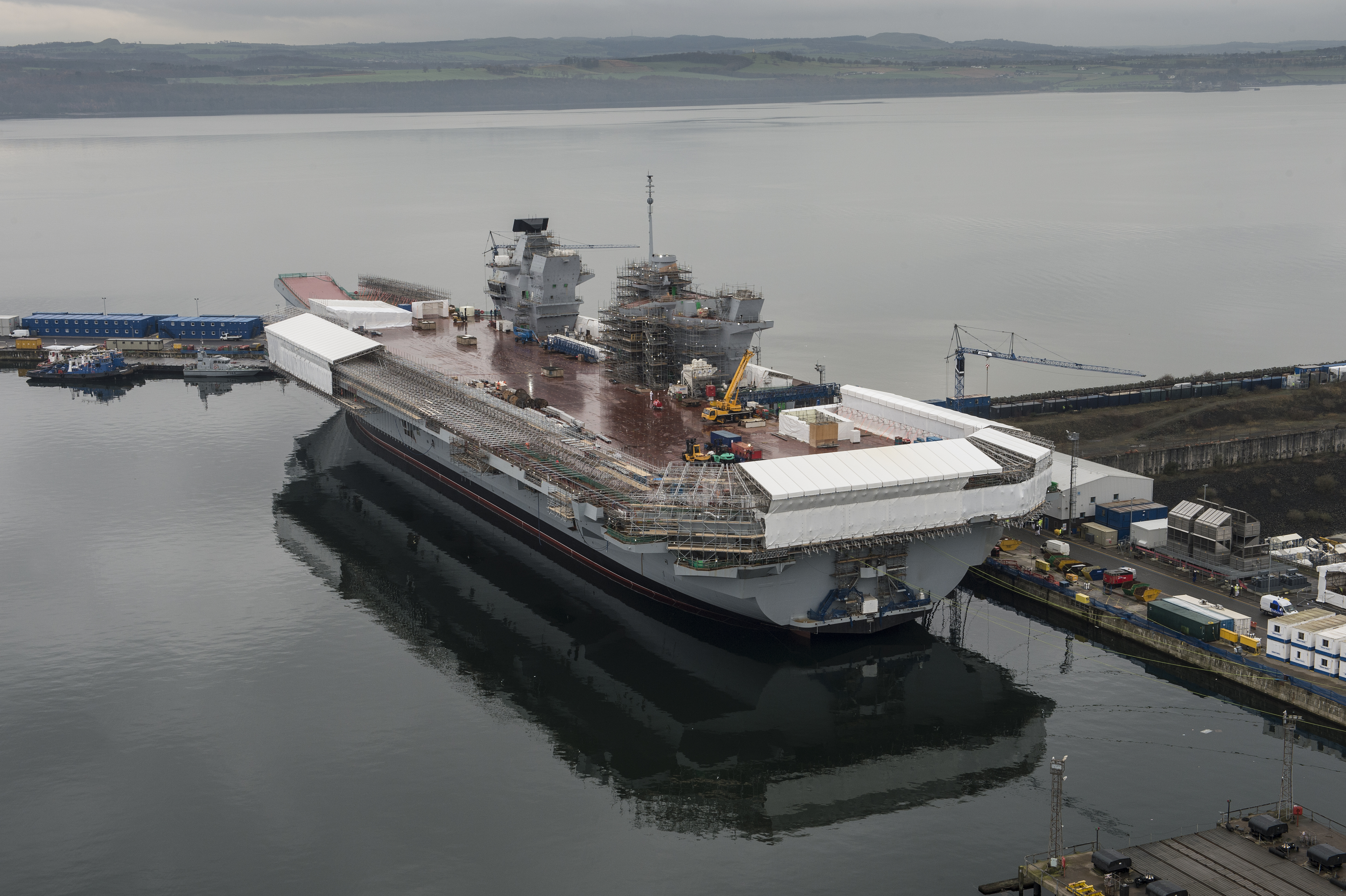
Queen Elizabeth during fitting-out, December 2014

The first steel cut for the project, in July 2009, signalled the start of construction of Lower Block 3 at BAE Systems Clyde, where production of Lower Block 4 started in January 2010. Meanwhile, construction of the bow Lower Block 1 was carried out at Appledore, North Devon, and was completed in March 2010.

On 25 January 2010, it was announced that the Cammell Laird shipyard has secured a £44 million contract to build the flight decks of the carriers. That same day, construction began in Portsmouth of the 6,000-tonne Lower Block 2 for Queen Elizabeth. On 16 August 2011, the 8,000-tonne Lower Block 03 of Queen Elizabeth left BAE Systems Surface Ships' Govan shipyard in Glasgow on a large ocean-going barge. Travelling 600 miles (970 km) around the northern coast of Scotland, the block arrived at Rosyth on the evening of 20 August 2011. Her forward island was built at BAE Portsmouth and attached on 14 March 2013; the aft island was attached in June 2013 and the ski jump in November 2013.

Queen Elizabeth was christened on 4 July 2014, and floated-out on 17 July 2014. On 26 June 2017, the new carrier left Rosyth for the first time to commence sea trials. Flight trials with helicopters began in July 2017 and F-35B flight trials were expected towards the end of 2018. Initial operational capability was declared on 4 January 2021.

==== Prince of Wales ====
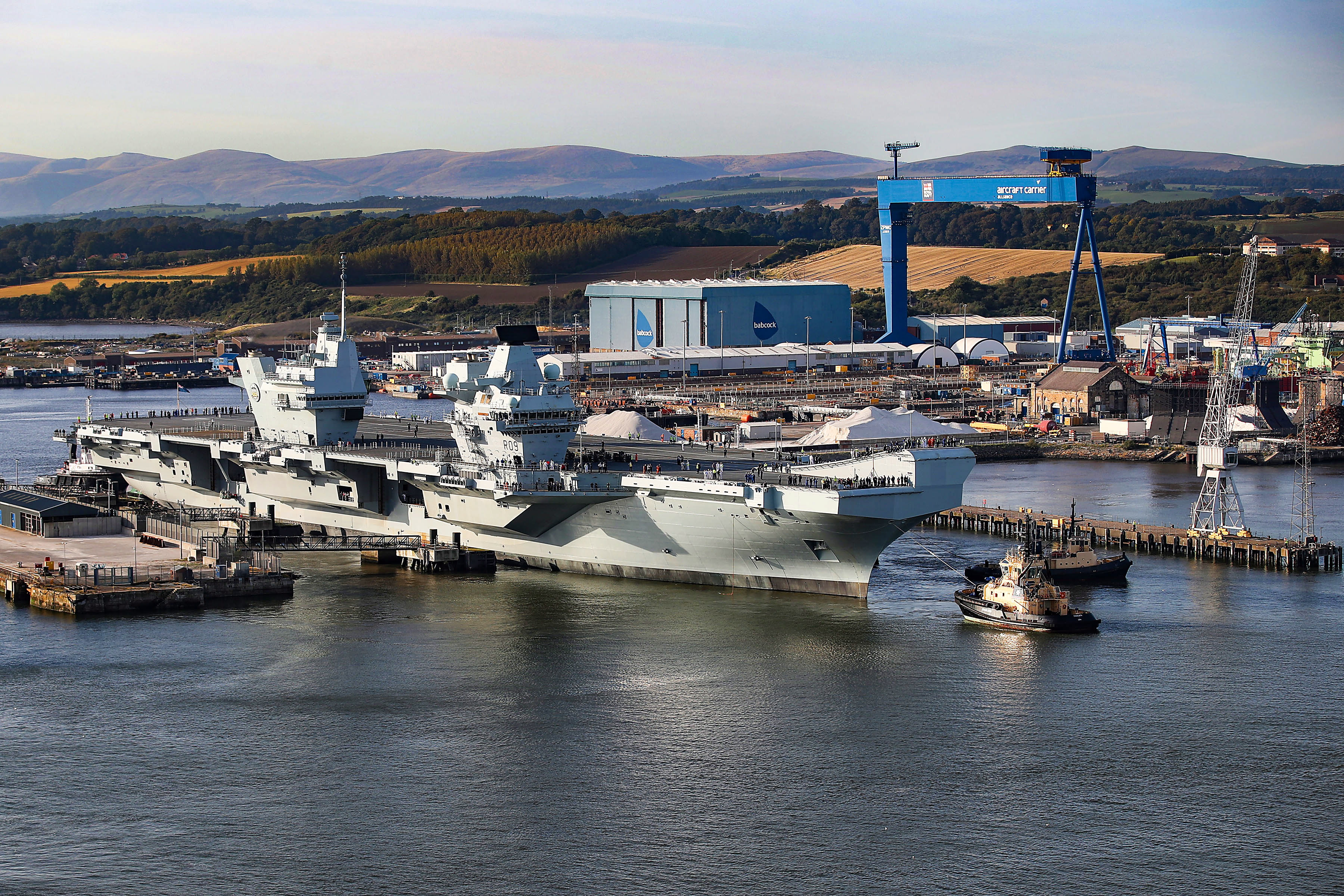
Prince of Wales is marshalled out of the basin at Rosyth for the first time, September 2019

The 2010 SDSR declared that the UK needed only one aircraft carrier; however, penalty clauses in the contract meant that cancelling the second vessel would be more expensive than actually building it. The SDSR, therefore, directed that the second aircraft carrier, Prince of Wales, should be built but upon completion be either mothballed or sold. The SDSR also directed that the ship be converted to a CATOBAR configuration; however, the costs associated with the conversion escalated to £2bn, leading the government to reverse its decision and build the ship to the original STOVL configuration. On 26 May 2011, Defence Secretary Liam Fox cut the first steel for Prince of Wales. The Royal Navy's 2012/13 yearbook stated "both carriers are likely to be commissioned and may even be capable of operating together". In 2014, the prime minister, David Cameron, announced that Prince of Wales would be brought into service.

As of 20 April 2016, construction of Prince of Wales was announced to be 80% complete. The ship was handed over to the Royal Navy on 10 December 2019 and had been set for a full operational capability from 2023.

Prince of Wales assumed responsibility for the continuing carrier trials of the F-35B in 2019 when Queen Elizabeth entered dry-dock for her scheduled maintenance period.

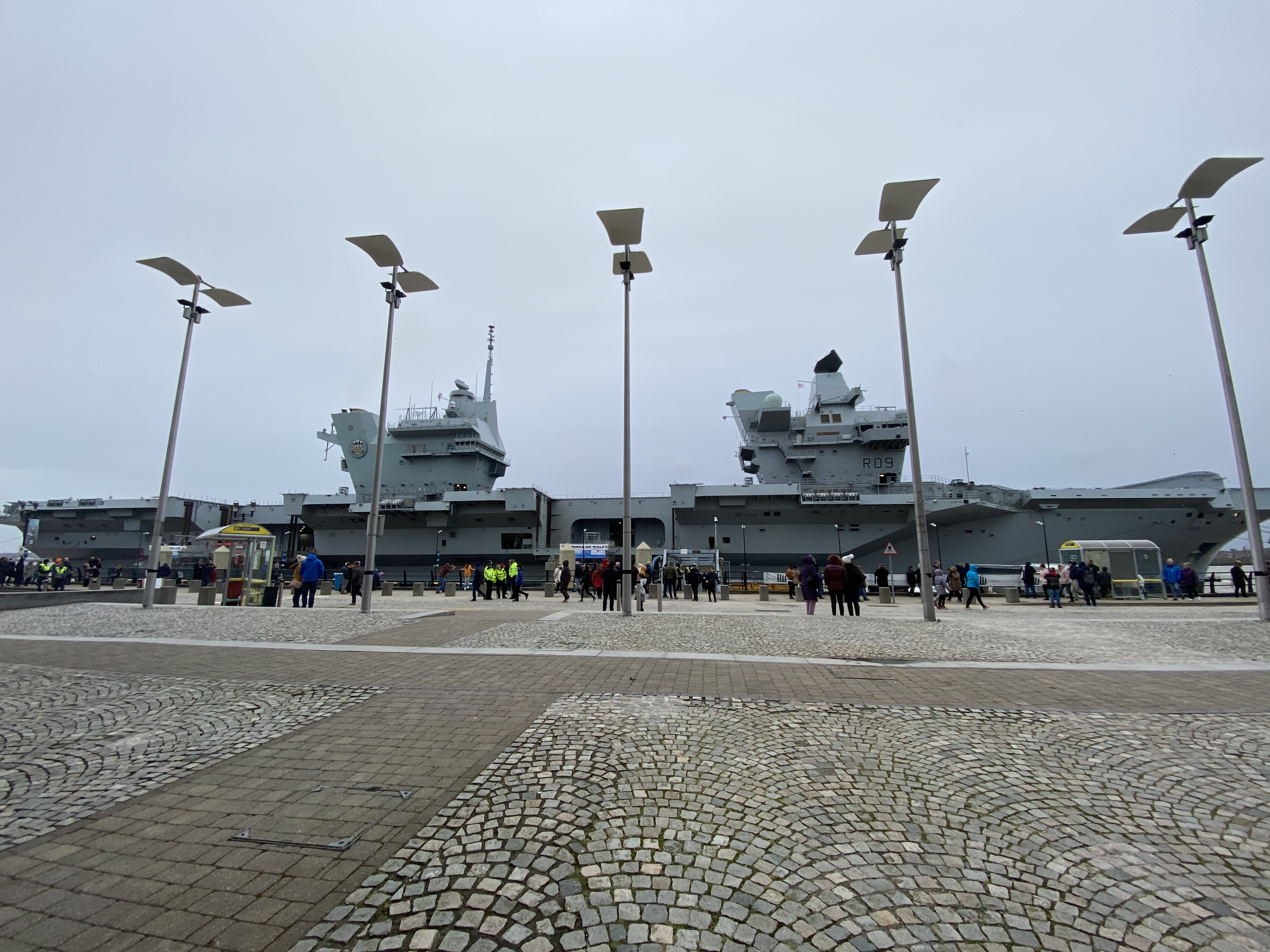
Prince of Wales as seen from Liverpool's Pier Head, February 2020.

Prince of Wales made her first visit to her affiliated city, Liverpool, from 28 February to 3 March 2020. During her stay in the city, the ship welcomed thousands of civilians aboard.

In August 2022, the external shaft coupling on the starboard propeller shaft failed, not long after Prince of Wales had set sail from Portsmouth Naval Base. The vessel was towed back to base. It was then taken to Babcock shipyard, in Rosyth, Scotland, to undergo repairs, which took nine months to complete.

== Costs ==
When the Secretary of State for Defence announced the contract for the vessels, the cost was initially estimated at £3.9 billion. At the time of approval the first carrier was expected to enter service in July 2015 and the budget was £4.1bn for two ships. The financial crisis led to a decision in December 2008 to slow production, delaying the first ship until May 2016 and the second by two years. This decision alone added £1.6bn to the cost. By March 2010 the budget was estimated at £5.9bn. If the carriers had been abandoned in the 2010 SDSR then the MoD could have cancelled £1.5bn of planned spending on Queen Elizabeth and £1.3bn of planned spending on Prince of Wales, but the loss of VAT exemption meant that cancelling one or two carriers would have overall saved £989m and £2,098m respectively. These long term savings were less important than the short term costs, there would have been nearly an extra £1bn of expenditure on cancellation costs. In November 2013 the contract was renegotiated with a budget of £6.2bn and BAE agreeing to pay 50% of any cost overruns rather than 10% as previously.

In 2018 the Committee of Public Accounts determined that build cost of the two carriers was £6.212 billion, and operational costs up to March 2021 were estimated at £0.6 billion. Costs for the aircraft were estimated up to March 2021 to be £5.8 billion on initial F-35s and £0.3 billion on the Crowsnest radar system for Merlin helicopters (based on an exchange rate of $1.55 to the pound in October 2017, but the rate has since fallen considerably). Important additional equipment such as communication equipment and related software for the F-35 was not yet funded. The whole life cost of the first 48 F-35s was roughly estimated as £13 billion, or over £270 million per F-35.

== See also ==
- Future of the Royal Navy
- French aircraft carrier PA2 – Proposed French aircraft carrier based on the QE-class design
- List of aircraft carriers in service

Equivalent aircraft carriers of the same era

- Type 003 – Chinese aircraft carrier
- MUGEM class – Class of Turkish aircraft carriers under construction
