= Aircraft Carrier Alliance =

British defense partnership founded in 2003

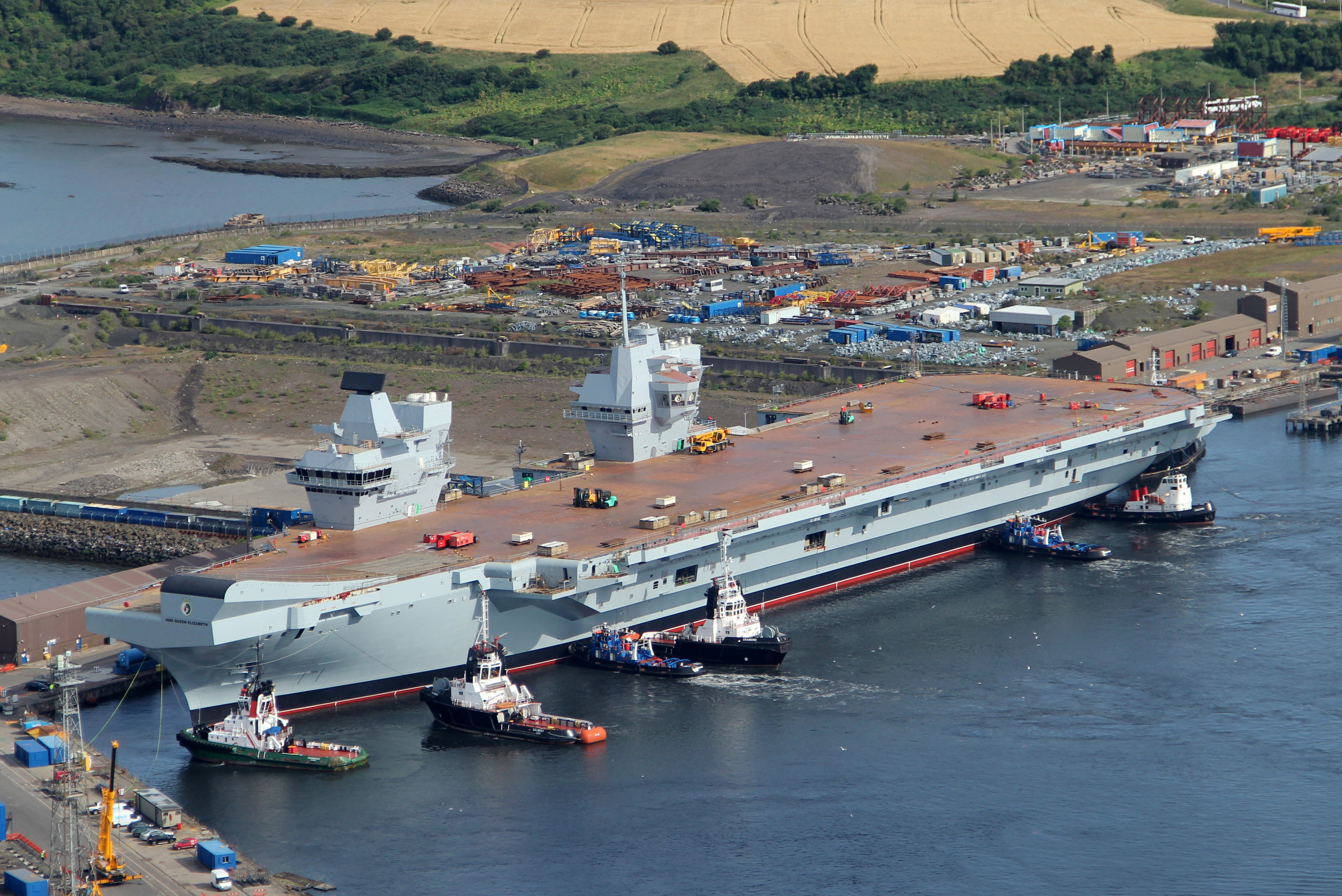
- HMS Queen Elizabeth (R08) under construction in Rosyth Dockyard
- Company type: Joint venture
- Founded: 2003
- Parent: Babcock International; BAE Systems; Ministry of Defence; Thales Group
- Website: www.aircraftcarrieralliance.co.uk

The Aircraft Carrier Alliance is a partnership of BAE Systems, Babcock International, Thales Group and the Ministry of Defence (which acts as both partner and client), together with Rosyth Dockyard, to build the Queen Elizabeth-class aircraft carriers for the Royal Navy. Along with Rosyth and BAE Systems' Govan yard, four other shipyards involved in the build process are A&P Tyne, Appledore Shipbuilders, Cammell Laird and HMNB Portsmouth.
