= Prince of Wales (EIC ship) =

Numerous British vessels that have served the British East India Company (EIC) have borne the name Prince of Wales, after the then current Prince of Wales, the title borne by the heir-presumptive to the throne of the United Kingdom.

EIC ships

- Prince of Wales, a galley of 228 tons (bm), launched on 7 November 1729 and condemned as unserviceable and sold for breaking up at Bombay in 1741.
- Prince of Wales (1737 EIC ship), of 559 tons (bm), launched on 21 June 1737 that made four voyages for the EIC before she was sold in 1749 for breaking up.
- Prince of Wales (1751 EIC ship), of 620 tons (bm), launched on 28 July 1751, that made four voyages for the EIC before being sold to a new owner who sailed her to India in 1764 where she remained.
- Prince of Wales (1765 EIC ship), of 716 tons (bm), launched on 16 September 1765 that made four voyages for the EIC before the Admiralty purchased her in 1777 for use as a storeship under the name HMS Supply, and that was destroyed in a fire at St Kitts, West Indies in 1779.
- Prince of Wales (1803 EIC ship), launched in 1803 and foundered in 1804.

Extra ships

- Prince of Wales (1786 ship), launched in 1779 but rebuilt in 1786, that made one trip transporting convicts and supplies to Botany Bay, and then carried a cargo for the EIC from Canton to Britain in 1787-89; she became a whaler, a privateer, a slave ship, was captured by a French privateer, was recaptured, and was last listed in 1810.
- Prince of Wales (1789 ship), launched in 1789 that made one voyage carrying supplies to New South Wales and a cargo for the EIC from Canton to Britain (1796–98), before resuming trading; she was last listed in 1811.

Bombay Marine

- Prince of Wales (1805 ship), a sloop of 148 or 15131/94 tons (bm), and 14 guns, launched in 1805 at the Bombay Dockyard for the Bombay Marine. She had an active military career and after the end of the First Anglo-Burmese War (1822–24), was sold at public auction.
