= Sheila Scott =

British aviator (1922–1988)

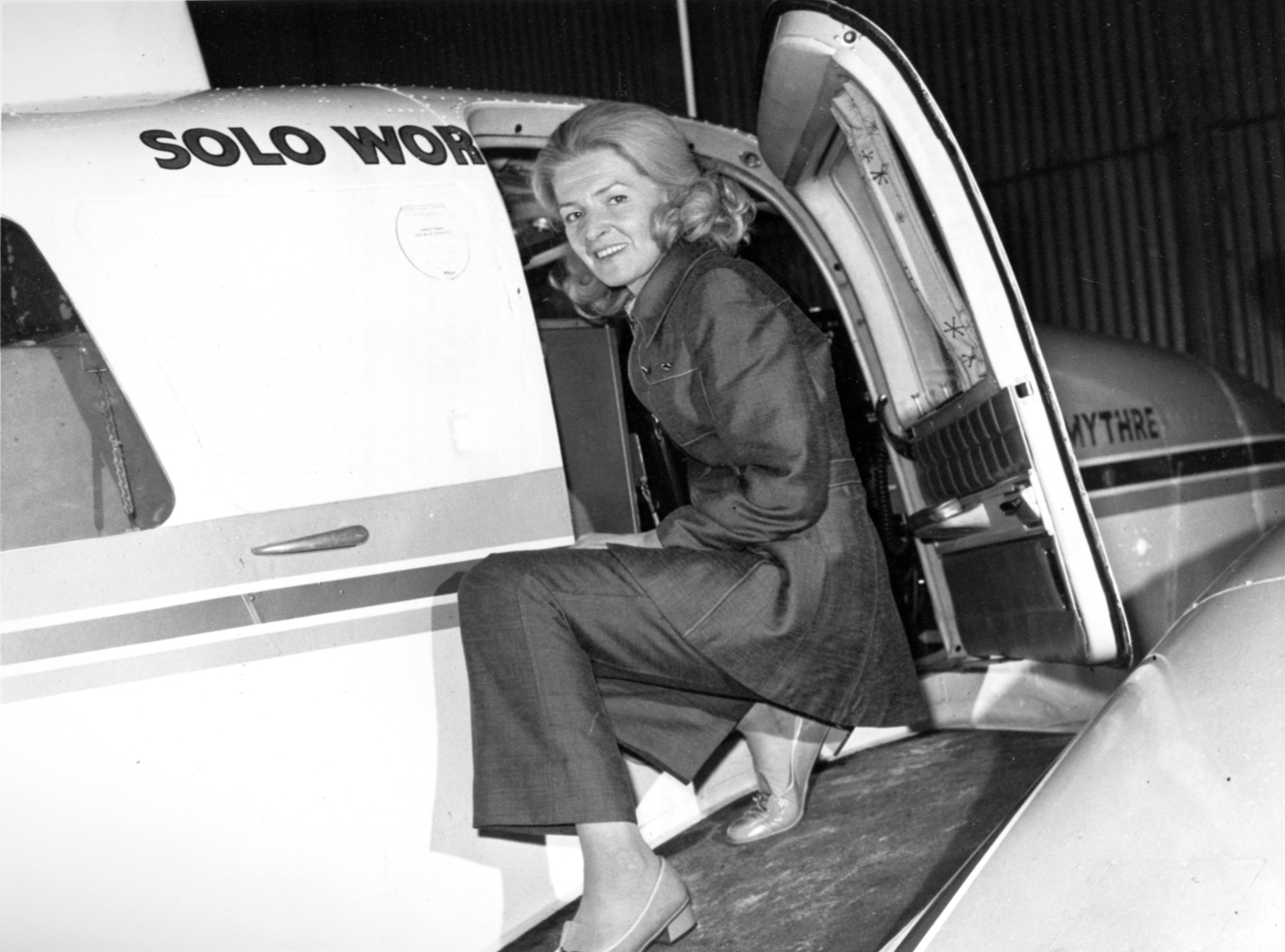
- Before her 1971 record-breaking trip
- Born: Sheila Christine Hopkins; 27 April 1922; Worcester, England
- Died: 20 October 1988 (aged 66); London, England
- Occupation: Aviator

Sheila Christine Scott OBE (née Hopkins; 27 April 1922 – 20 October 1988) was an English aviator who broke over 100 aviation records through her long-distance flight endeavours, which included a 34,000-mile (55,000 km) "world and a half" flight in 1971. On this flight, she became the first person to fly over the North Pole in a small aircraft. She was also the first European woman to fly solo around the world.

== Early years ==
Born Sheila Christine Hopkins in Worcester, Worcestershire, England, she had a turbulent childhood and did not do well at the Alice Ottley School, nearly being expelled several times. During World War II, she joined the services as a nurse in a naval hospital.

== Flying ==
In 1943, she started a career as an actress as Sheila Scott, a name she maintained long after she stopped acting. She had a short marriage from 1945 to 1950 to Rupert Bellamy.

In 1958 she learned to fly, going solo at Thruxton Aerodrome after nine months of training. Her first aircraft was a Thruxton Jackaroo (converted from a De Havilland Tiger Moth) G-APAM, which she owned from 1959 to 1964.

In May 1965 the Piper Aircraft company loaned their Piper Comanche 400 European demonstrator N8515P (named Myth Sunpip) to Sheila, enabling her to set a number of European speed records for its class, such as return trips from London (RAF Northolt) to The Hague, Brussels, Dublin, and Belfast.

=== Around the world flights ===
In April 1966, she obtained another Piper Comanche, this time a 260B registered G-ATOY (named Myth Too) in which she set many of her records. It was in this aircraft that she made her first solo round the world flight, departing London Heathrow on 18 May 1966 and returning on 20 June 1966, having covered approximately 31,000 miles (50,000 kilometres) in 189 flying hours over 34 days. It was the first solo around the world flight by a British subject, the longest-distance solo flight, and the only third around the world flight by a woman.

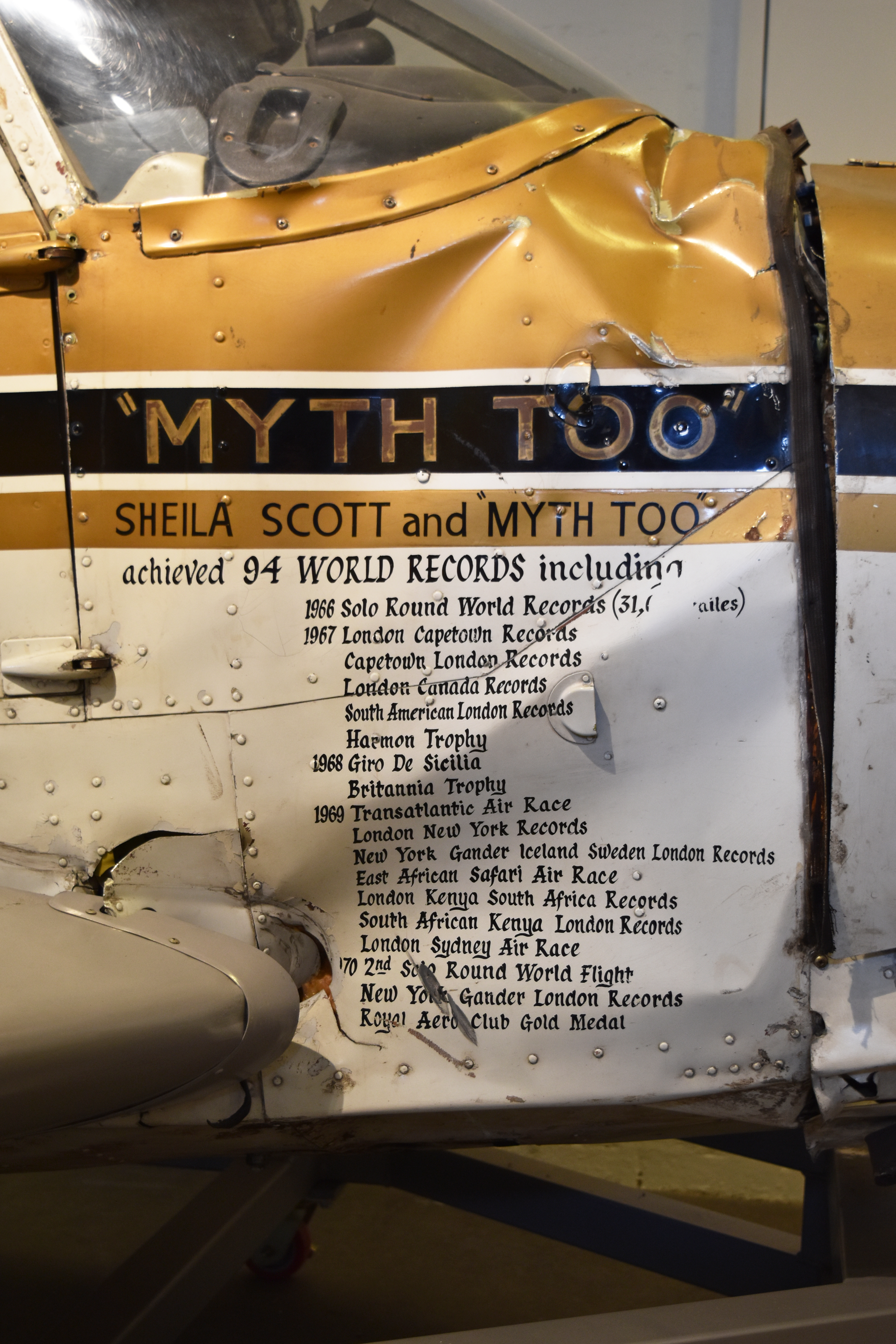

In 1969–70, she took part in the London to Sydney Air Race (with G-ATOY), thereafter continuing solo around the world for a second time. She was the only solo female pilot participating in the race, and experienced problems on the course. Scott was plagued by technical problems during the race, and was stranded for several days due to broken navigational equipment. She sold the aircraft in 1971, and some years later it crashed following engine failure. The remains are on display in the collection of the National Museum of Flight in East Fortune, Scotland.

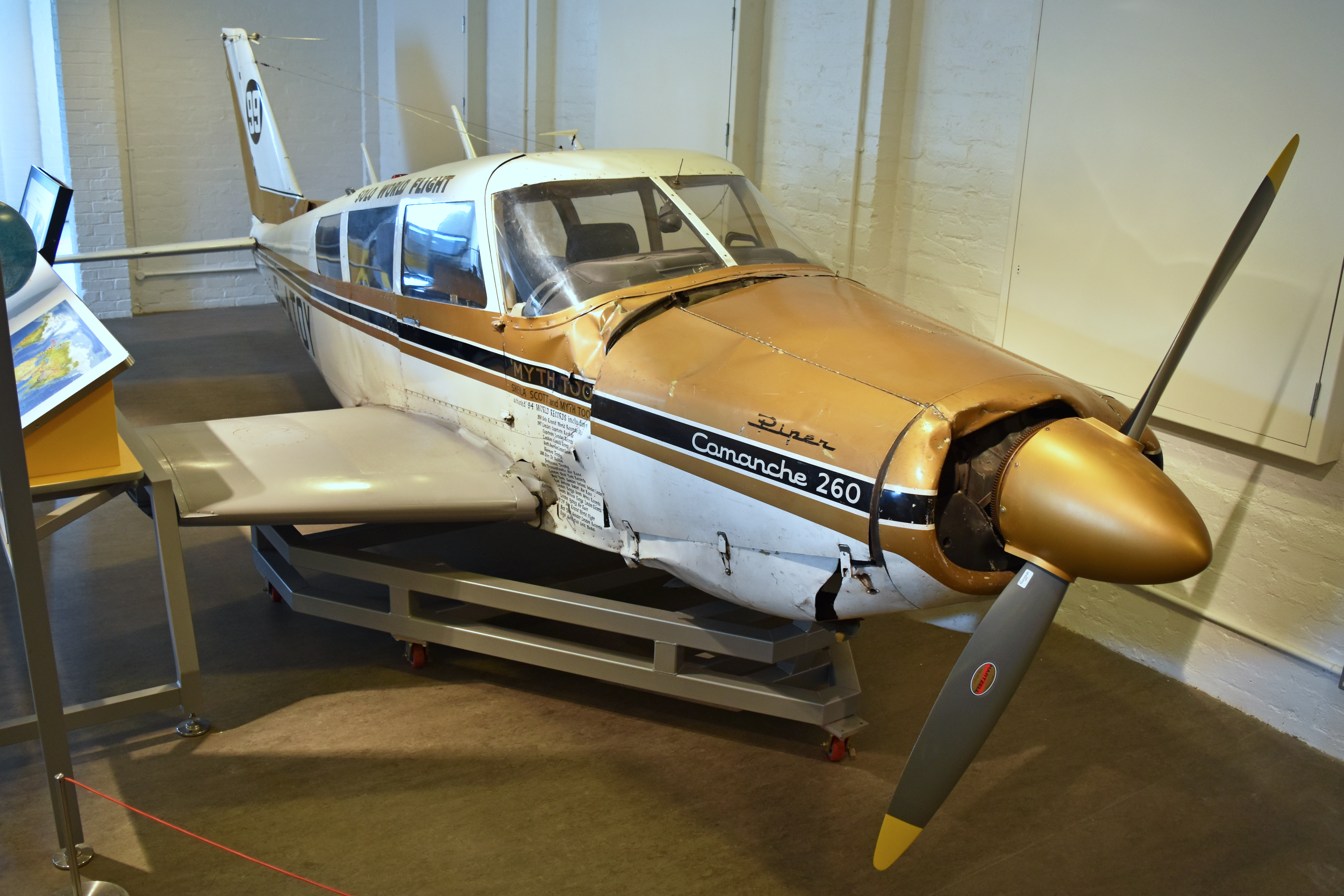
Damaged by a subsequent owner, the unrepaired "MYTH TOO" is now on display in the 'Fantastic Flight' building at the National Museum of Flight (part of National Museums Scotland). East Fortune Airfield, East Lothian, Scotland.

In 1971, she used a twin-engine Piper Aztec 250 G-AYTO (named Mythre) to complete her third solo round the world flight, featuring an unusual route starting at Nairobi, just south of the equator, flying north to London, before continuing on to cross over the North Pole (a first for a light aircraft). She then continued via Anchorage and San Francisco to Hawaii, before crossing the equator again on her way to Darwin, Australia. From here, she began the return to London, with the 'world-and-a-half' circumnavigation taking 55 days. During her flight, she carried NASA equipment as part of an experimental test of satellite communications technology.

Despite winning many records in the flight, Scott later claimed the trip cost her $110,400 and left her heavily in debt.

Mythre was returned to the Piper factory in Lock Haven, PA where it was one of over a hundred planes damaged beyond repair in a flood in 1972.

=== World Record Flights ===
Scott made over 100 world record flights. These include:

- 1965: London to Dublin #13754
- 1965: London to Paris #13767
- 1965: London to Den Haag and return #13762
- 1965: Den Haag to London #13651
- 1965: London to Dublin and return #13755
- 1965: Belfast to London #13347
- 1966: Scott's Around the World Flight set ten Fédération Aéronautique Internationale (FAI) World Records for Speed Over a Recognised Course:
  - London to Rome, 258.13 kilometers per hour (160.40 miles per hour) (FAI Record File Numbers 4679, 4680);
  - London to Auckland, 41.42 km/h (25.74 mph) #4660, 4661;
  - London to Darwin, 45.67 km/h (28.38 mph) #4666, 4670;
  - London to Fiji Islands, 34.60 km/h (21.50 mph) #4672; 4673;
  - Lisbon to London, 244.00 km/h (151.62 mph) #4956, 4657.
- 1967: London to Cape Town
- 1967: Malta to London #4685
- 1967: Shannon, Ireland to Ottawa, Canada #4700
- 1967: Madrid, Spain to London, UK #4683
- 1967: North Atlantic Ocean
- 1969: South Atlantic Ocean
- 1971: Equator to Equator over the North Pole
- 1971: San Francisco, CA to Honolulu, HI #4626
- 1971: 3rd Around the World Solo (100th world record)

== Affiliations ==
She was the founder and the first governor of the British branch of the Ninety-Nines, an association for licensed women pilots which had been created by Amelia Earhart. She was a member of the International Association of Licensed Women Pilots and of the Whirly-Girls, an association of women helicopter pilots.

== Honours and awards ==
- 1968: Appointed an Officer of the Order of the British Empire (OBE).
- 1966 and 1970: Scott was awarded the Harmon International Aviation Trophy (Aviatrix category) for her round-the-world flights and other accomplishments, including setting a new light plane speed record of 28,633 miles solo in 33 days and 3 minutes.
- 1965, 1967, 1968: Brabazon of Tara Award.
- 1967: Jean Lennox Bird Trophy
- 1968: Britannia Trophy of the Royal Aero Club of Britain
- 1971: Royal Aero Club Gold Medal
- Silver Medal of the Guild of Pilots
- Isabella d'Este (Italy)
- 2020: AIRDAT, a British airport systems, data and training company, named their January 2020 software update SCOTT after Sheila Scott
- 2023: A blue plaque was placed at RGS Worcester to commemorate her time at the Alice Ottley School (which merged with RGS Worcester in 2007).
- The University of Worcester has named a teaching building after her, the Sheila Scott Building.

== Activities beyond flying and later years ==
On 20 November 1966, she appeared as a contestant on the American panel show What's My Line. The following year, she appeared as herself on the game show To Tell the Truth where she received three of four possible votes.

In 1971, she passed her automobile driving test, after four failed tries in 12 years. In 1972, she turned her attention to the sea, and looked for sponsors for an around-the-world yacht race, to be held the next year. It is unclear if this race ever took place.

Scott was a published author as well as an aviator. She wrote I Must Fly in 1968 and On Top of the World in 1973, the latter being published in the U.S. as Barefoot in the Sky in 1974.

During one of her races, her London flat was burgled, and she never recovered financially. Before her death, Scott lived in a bedsit in Pimlico in poverty. She was diagnosed with cancer and died at age 66 at the Royal Marsden Hospital, London, in 1988.

== Sources ==
- Hahn, Michael (31 October 2002). "Sheila Scott". Great Images in NASA. Archived from the original on 17 January 2006.
