= Thruxton Aerodrome =

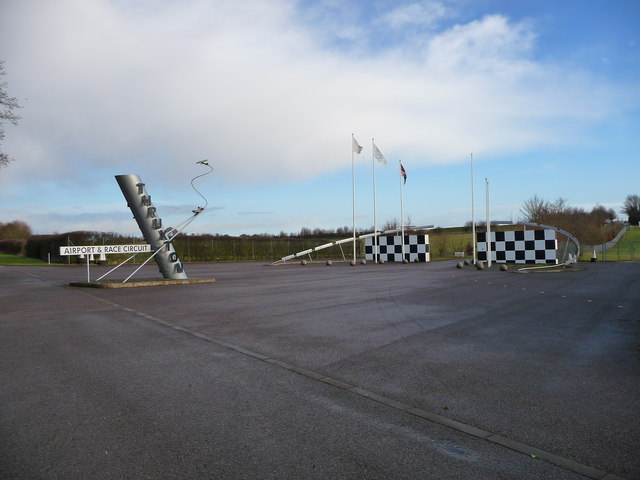
- Entrance to airfield and racing circuit, 2009
- IATA: QGO; ICAO: EGHO

Summary
- Airport type: Private
- Operator: Thruxton Circuit Ltd
- Location: Andover, Hampshire
- Elevation AMSL: 319 ft (97 m)
- Coordinates: 51°12′38″N 001°36′00″W

Map
- Location in Hampshire

Runways
Direction	Length		Surface
Direction	m	ft	Surface
07/25	969	3,179	Asphalt
12/30	757	2,484	Grass
- Sources: UK AIP at NATS

Thruxton Aerodrome (ICAO: EGHO) is located in Thruxton, 4.5 NM (8.3 km; 5.2 mi) west of Andover, in Hampshire, England.

The airfield was opened in 1942 as RAF Thruxton. Postwar, it was reopened by the Wiltshire School of Flying in 1947, and private and club flying operations continue to the present time.

Thruxton Aerodrome has a CAA Ordinary Licence (Number UKEGHO-001) that allows flights for the public transport of passengers or for flying instruction as authorised by the licensee, Thruxton Circuit Limited.

Motorbike racing began on a track using the runways and perimeter roads in 1950. Thruxton Circuit, which follows the line of the perimeter road, has been used for motorbike and car racing since 1968.

Many air cadets were trained here on Flying Scholarships and gained their PPLs. The training was carried out by the Wiltshire School of Flying on DH.82 Tiger Moth and Jackaroo aircraft.

From 1959 until April 2024 the aerodrome was operated by Western Air (Thruxton) Limited. Ownership of the aerodrome and surrounding site then passed to Thruxton Circuit Limited.

== Parachuting ==
In the 1960s, the airfield was the headquarters of the British Skydivers Club.

On Sunday September 1964, 23 year old Peter Banner, of Beverley Road, in Barnes, fell 8,000 ft, when his main chute failed to open. His parents were from Wiltshire. He was the last of six to jump from a de Havilland Dragon.

On Sunday 6 November 1966, 22 year Kenneth Barnaby Smith fell 2,500 ft, to land on the grass verge of the A303 road, when his chute failed to open.

In June and July 1983, around 2,300 jumps were made; 1,800 jumps had been made in June, July and August 1982. But by the summer of 1983, orthopaedic consultants, such as Francis Moynihan, at the Royal Hampshire County Hospital viewed the number of parachutist injuries, from Thruxton, as excessive. It was taking up hospital beds. One parachutist, a male aged 62, lost a leg, and others had major fractures. The parachute club was closed in 1984, after a series of accidents.

After an accident 9 August 1987 at 12.20pm, with an Islander aircraft, and helicopter G-BALE, Labour MP Terry Fields wanted to ban charity parachute jumps, and Conservative MP Anthony Beaumont-Dark wanted more registration.

== Incidents ==
On Friday 11 August 1995 a Beechcraft Baron G-BAHN taking off for Deauville crashed nearby at Fyfield, Hampshire. Two Squadron Leaders, husband and wife aged 36, and another officer, aged 44, from RAF Uxbridge were killed, with a Major, aged 36, from the 47th Regiment Royal Artillery.
