= Thruxton Jackaroo =

Jackaroo
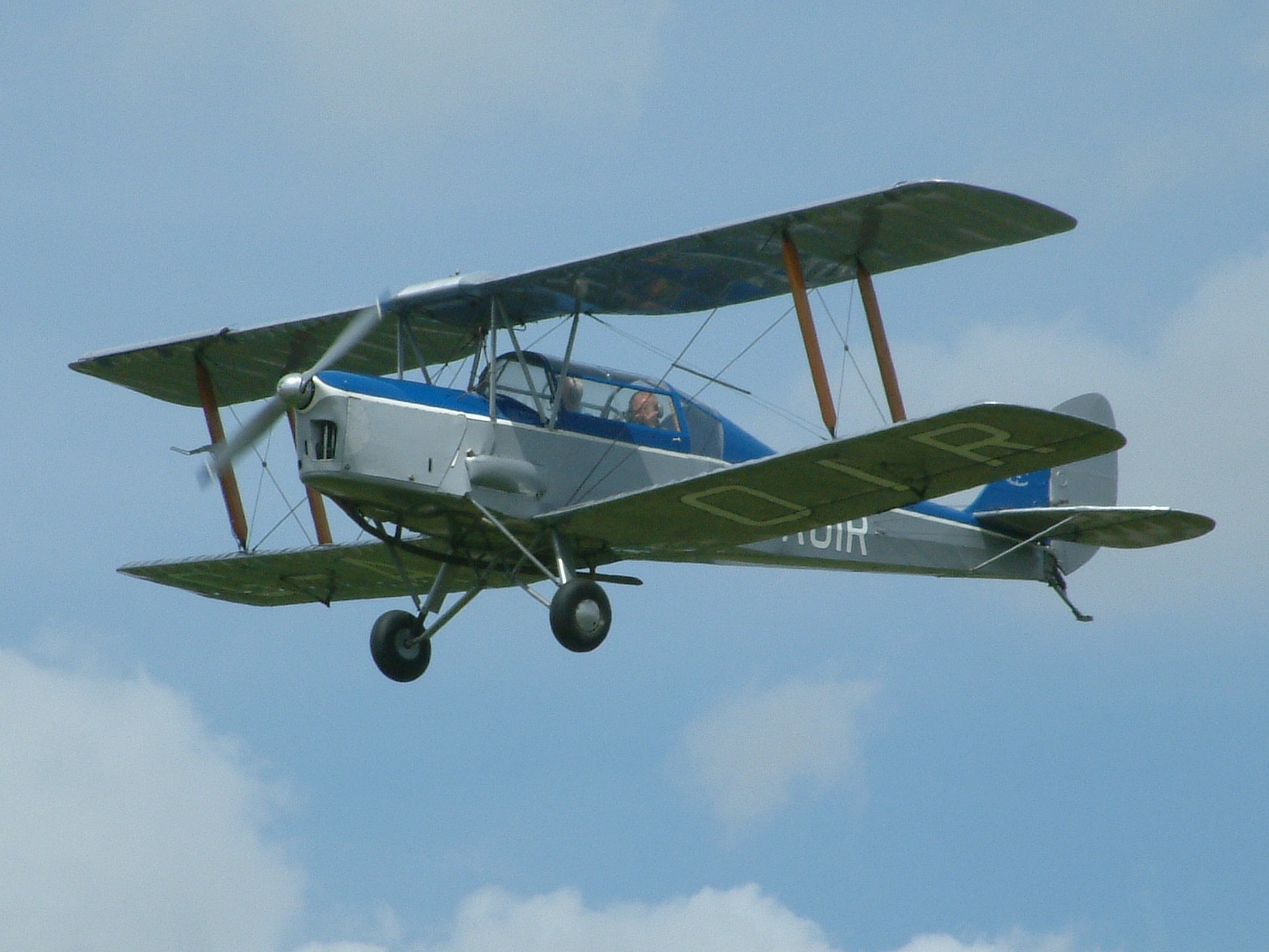

General information
- Type: Cabin Tourer
- Manufacturer: Jackaroo Aircraft Limited
- Primary user: Wiltshire School of Flying
- Number built: 19 conversions

History
- First flight: 1957
- Developed from: de Havilland Tiger Moth

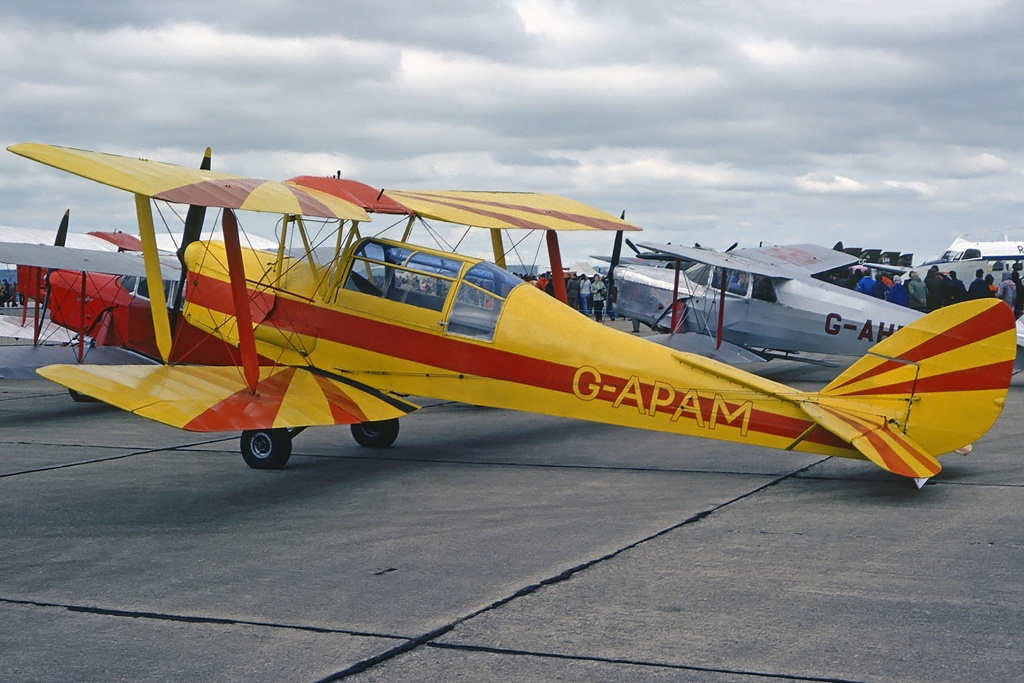
A Jackaroo in 1980

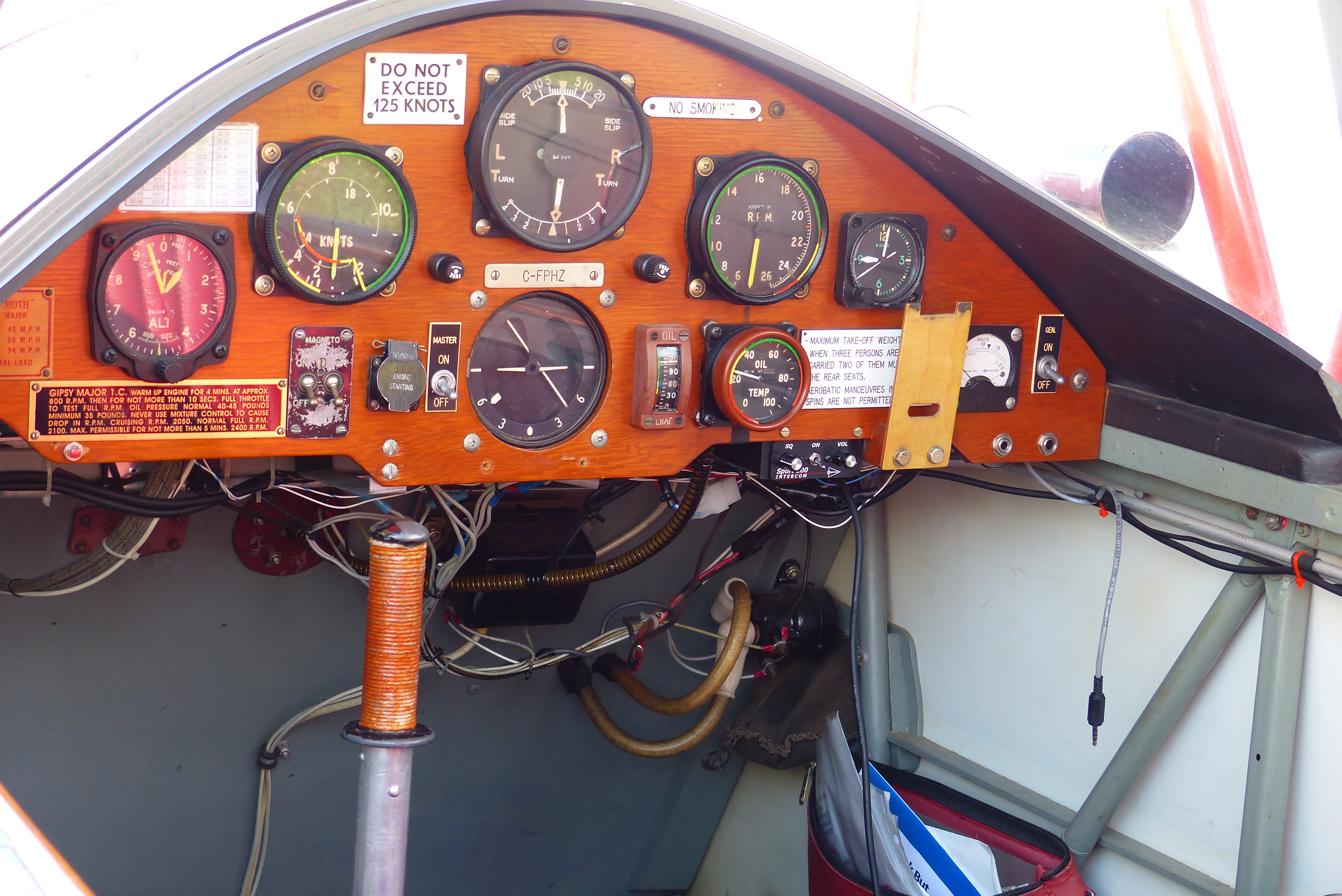
Jackaroo cockpit

The Thruxton Jackaroo was a 1950s British four-seat cabin biplane converted from a de Havilland Tiger Moth by Jackaroo Aircraft Limited at Thruxton Aerodrome and Rollason Aircraft and Engines Limited at Croydon Airport.

== History ==
The Thruxton Jackaroo was designed as a four-seat cabin general purpose biplane; the original tandem two-seat Tiger Moth fuselage was widened to allow side-by-side seating for 4 people. It was marketed as "the cheapest four-seat aircraft in the world". The first conversion first flew on 2 March 1957. Eighteen Tiger Moths were converted by Jackaroo Aircraft Limited between 1957 and 1959 and one aircraft was converted by Rollason's in 1960. The aircraft could be fitted with an optional crop-spraying gear. One converted aircraft was further modified as a single-seat agricultural aircraft, but with little interest in the variant the aircraft was converted back to a Mk. 1.

== Variants ==
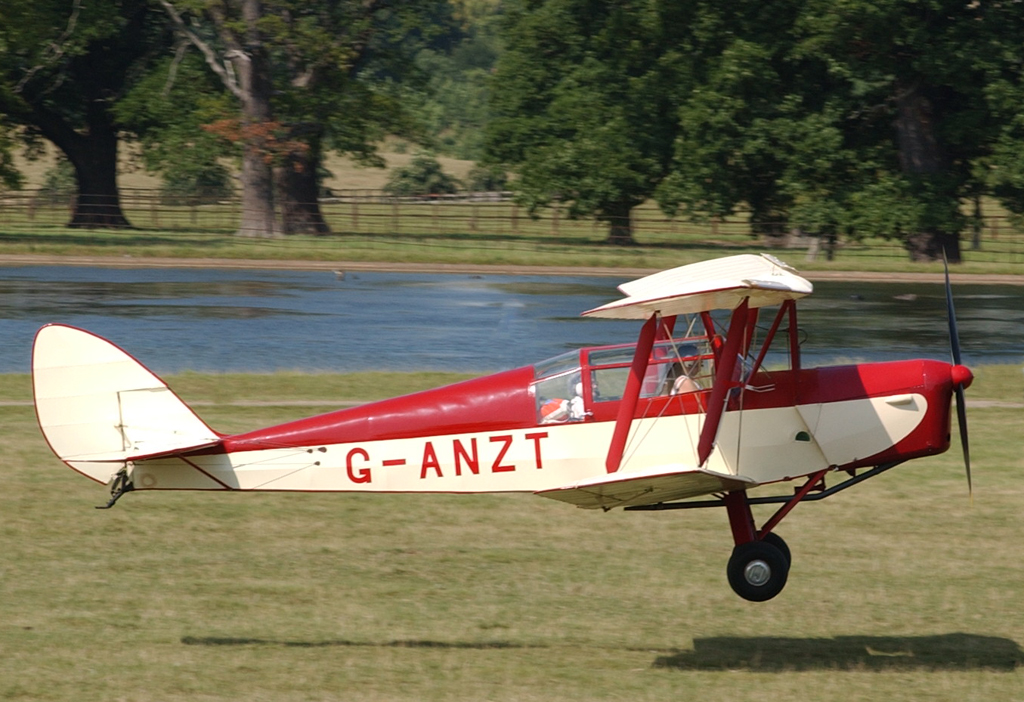
Jackaroo in 2003

- Jackaroo Mk 1

Production cabin biplane with wooden canopy.

- Jackaroo Mk 2

Single-seat agricultural variant with either a hopper or a 60-gallon tank in place of the two front seats, one conversion.

- Jackaroo Mk 3

Production cabin biplane with metal canopy and provision for brakes.

== Specifications ==
Data from De Havilland Aircraft since 1909

General characteristics

- Crew: 1
- Capacity: 3 passengers
- Length: 25 ft 0 in (7.62 m)
- Wingspan: 30 ft 4 1/4 in (9.25 m)
- Height: 9 ft 6 in (2.90 m)
- Wing area: 239 sq ft (22.2 m^{2})
- Empty weight: 1,360 lb (617 kg)
- Max takeoff weight: 2,180 lb (989 kg)
- Powerplant: 1 × de Havilland Gipsy Major 4-cylinder air-cooled inverted in-line piston engine, 130 hp (97 kW)
- Propellers: 2-bladed fixed-pitch propeller

Performance

- Maximum speed: 102 mph (164 km/h, 89 kn)
- Cruise speed: 90 mph (140 km/h, 78 kn)
- Range: 250 mi (400 km, 220 nmi)
- Rate of climb: 600 ft/min (3.0 m/s)

== See also ==
Related development

- de Havilland Tiger Moth
