= De Havilland Tiger Moth =

1930s British military trainer aircraft

DH.82 Tiger Moth
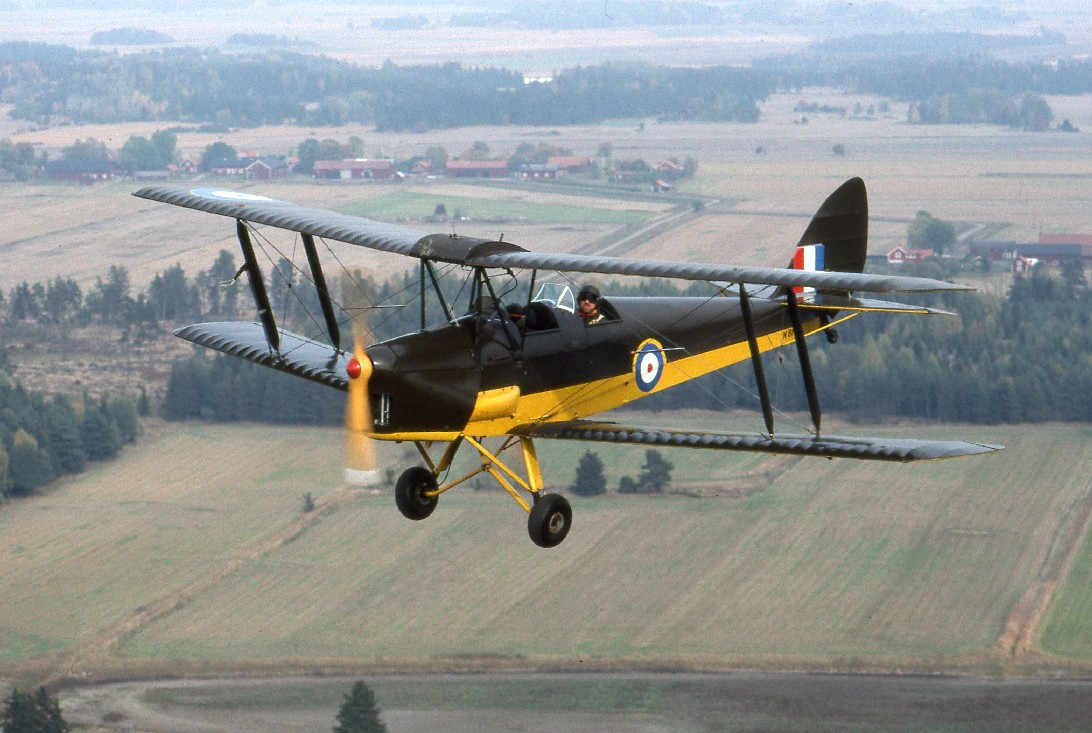
- A Tiger Moth in 1989

General information
- Type: Trainer
- Manufacturer: de Havilland Aircraft Company de Havilland Canada
- Designer: Geoffrey de Havilland
- Status: In service for civil use
- Primary users: Royal Air Force Royal Canadian Air Force; Royal Australian Air Force; Royal New Zealand Air Force
- Number built: 8,868

History
- Manufactured: 1931–1944
- Introduction date: February 1932
- First flight: 26 October 1931
- Retired: 1959
- Developed from: de Havilland DH.60 Moth
- Variant: Thruxton Jackaroo

The de Havilland DH.82 Tiger Moth is a 1930s British biplane designed by Geoffrey de Havilland and built by the de Havilland Aircraft Company. It was operated by the Royal Air Force (RAF) and other operators as a primary trainer aircraft. In addition to the type's principal use for ab initio training, the Second World War had RAF Tiger Moths operating in other capacities, including maritime surveillance and defensive anti-invasion preparations; some aircraft were outfitted to function as armed light bombers.

The Tiger Moth remained in service with the RAF until it was replaced by the de Havilland Chipmunk during the early 1950s. Many of the military surplus aircraft subsequently entered into civilian operation. Many nations have used the Tiger Moth in both military and civilian applications, and it remains in widespread use as a recreational aircraft. It is still occasionally used as a primary training aircraft, particularly for pilots wanting to gain experience before moving on to other tailwheel aircraft. Many Tiger Moths are now employed by companies offering trial lesson experiences.

== Design and development ==
=== Origins ===
Geoffrey de Havilland, the company's owner and founder, had sought to produce a light aircraft superior to two of his previous designs, the de Havilland Humming Bird and de Havilland DH.51. From earlier experience, de Havilland knew the difficulty and importance of correctly sizing such an aircraft to appeal to the civilian market, such as touring, trainer, flying club, and private aviation customers; the firm had great success with a scaled-down version of the DH.51, the de Havilland DH.60 Moth.

The first aircraft to bear the name Tiger Moth was the de Havilland DH.71 Tiger Moth. De Havilland had developed successively more capable Gipsy engines, and the company had produced the new low-winged monoplane aircraft to test them. Improvements made on the Tiger Moth monoplane were incorporated into a military trainer variant of the DH.60 Moth, the DH.60T Moth – the T standing for both 'Tiger' and 'Trainer'.

The DH.60T Moth had several shortcomings, thus was subject to several alterations, such as the adoption of shortened interplane struts to raise the wingtips after insufficient ground clearance was discovered while it was undergoing trials at RAF Martlesham Heath. As a result of the Martlesham trials, a favourable report for the type was produced, which in turn led to the type soon being formally adopted as the new basic trainer of the Royal Air Force (RAF). A single prototype, designated the DH.82 Tiger Moth, was ordered by the British Air Ministry under Specification 15/31, which sought a suitable ab initio training aircraft.

One of the main changes from the preceding Moth series was improved access to the front cockpit, since the training requirement specified that the front-seat occupant had to be able to escape easily, especially when wearing a parachute. Access to the front cockpit of the Moth's predecessors was restricted by the proximity of the aircraft's fuel tank, directly above the front cockpit, and the rear cabane struts for the upper wing. The solution adopted was to shift the upper wing forward but sweep the wings back to maintain the same centre of lift. Other changes included a strengthened structure, fold-down doors on both sides of the cockpit, and a revised exhaust system.

On 26 October 1931 the first 'true' Tiger Moth, the prototype E6, made its maiden flight at Stag Lane Aerodrome, Edgware, London, flown by de Havilland Chief Test Pilot Hubert Broad . Shortly thereafter construction of the first 35 production aircraft for the RAF, designated K2567-K2601, began following the issuing of Specification T.23/31; in addition two float-equipped seaplanes, S1675 and S1676, were built according to Specification T.6/33.

=== Design ===
The de Havilland DH.82 Tiger Moth is a single-engined, biplane, taildragger aircraft with two seats in tandem configuration. It was developed principally to be used by private touring customers as well as for pilot instruction for both military and civilian operators. It is typically powered by a de Havilland Gipsy III 120 hp engine; later models are often fitted with more powerful models of this engine, while some have been re-engined by third-party companies.

One characteristic of the Tiger Moth design is its differential aileron control setup. The ailerons (on the lower wing only) on a Tiger Moth are operated by an externally mounted circular bell crank, which lies flush with the lower wing's fabric undersurface covering. This circular bell crank is rotated by metal cables and chains from the cockpit's control columns, and has the externally mounted aileron pushrod attached at a point 45° outboard and forward of the bell crank's centre when the ailerons are both at their neutral position. This results in an aileron control system operating with barely any travel down at all on the wing on the outside of the turn, while the aileron on the inside travels a large amount upwards to counteract adverse yaw.

From the outset, the Tiger Moth proved to be an ideal trainer, simple and cheap to own and maintain, although it required positive and prompt control movements. Some instructors preferred these flight characteristics because of the effect of "weeding out" the inept student pilot.

=== Production ===
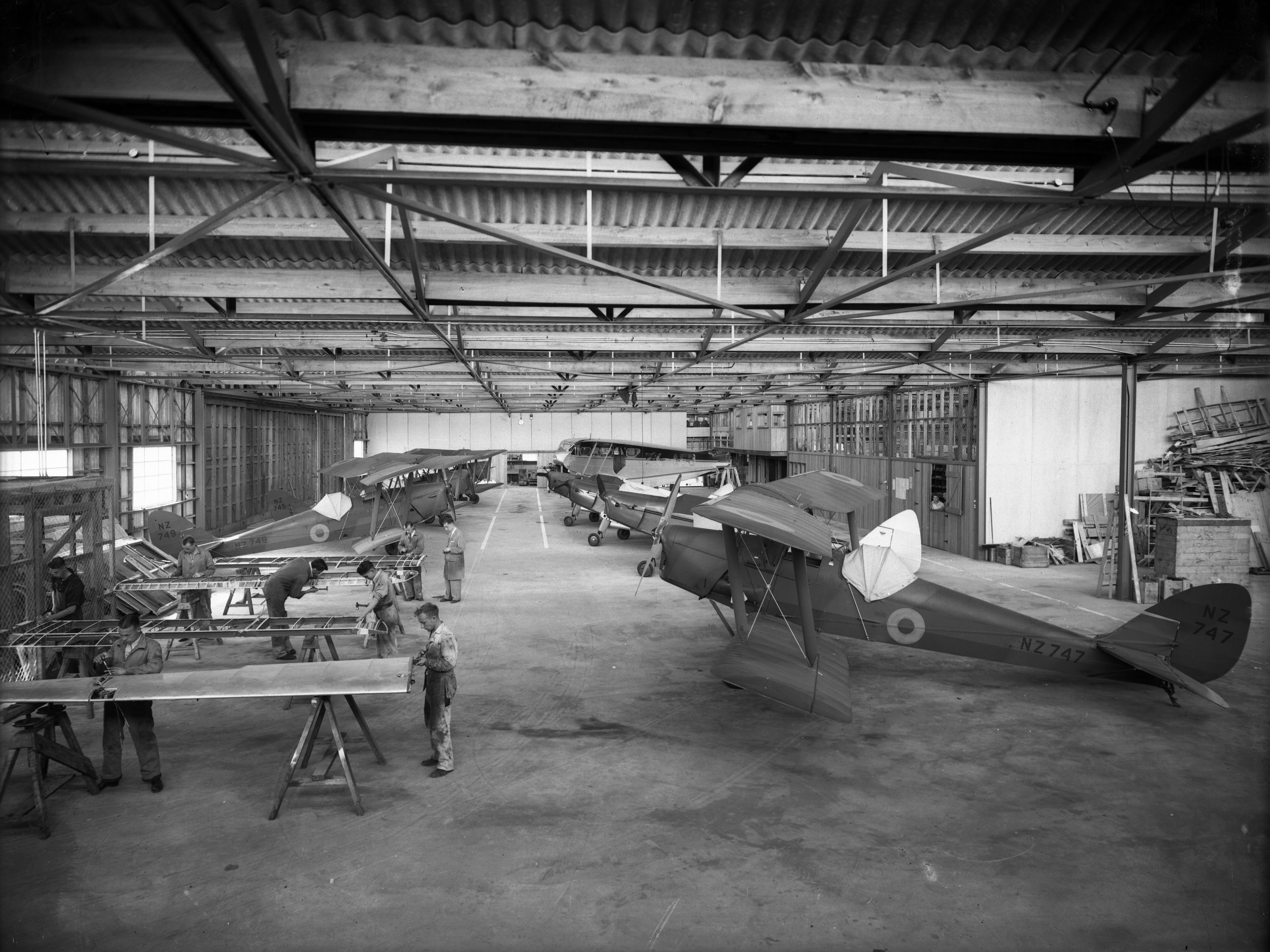
Royal New Zealand Air Force Tiger Moth aircraft with blind flying hoods for instrument training, early in the war

The Tiger Moth quickly became a commercial success, and examples were sold to more than 25 air forces. In addition to the military demand, aircraft were also produced for the civilian market. At one point, the flow of orders for the Tiger Moth effectively occupied almost the entirety of de Havilland's capacity to manufacture aircraft, and little capacity could be spared to accommodate domestic customers. In 1932, de Havilland also developed an affordable air taxi from the Tiger Moth, using many of the main components of the former with a new plywood fuselage seating four people in an enclosed cabin; it was marketed as the de Havilland Fox Moth. Following the end of all manufacturing, third parties occasionally rebuilt Tiger Moths to a similar configuration to the Fox Moth, such as the Thruxton Jackaroo.

In late 1934, 50 Tiger Moths of a more refined design, sometimes referred to as the Tiger Moth II, were delivered to the RAF; these aircraft adopted the de Havilland Gipsy Major engine, capable of generating 130 HP, and the use of plywood decking on the rear fuselage in place of fabric . Throughout the period 1934–1936, production activity was centred upon meeting the demand for military trainers, including several contracts having been placed by the RAF to Specification T.7/35, along with export orders by seven overseas operators. Civil examples were also being produced at this time, both for British private customers and to export customers in countries such as Ceylon, Greece, Lithuania, Rhodesia, Peru, and Switzerland.

After 1936, the gradual rate of acceleration of Tiger Moth manufacturing had reached the point where production capacity finally became able to exceed the demands from military customers alone. By the outbreak of the Second World War a total of 1,424 Tiger Moths had been completed by both domestic and overseas manufacturing efforts. In 1941 de Havilland transferred principal manufacturing activity for the Tiger Moth from its Hatfield factory to Morris Motors Limited at their facility in Cowley, Oxford.

In 1945, British Tiger Moth production was ended; by this point, Morris Motors had completed a total of 3,433 Tiger Moths.

Overseas manufacturing of the type commenced in 1937; the first such overseas builder was de Havilland Canada at its facility in Downsview, Ontario. In addition to an initial batch of 25 Tiger Moths that were built for the Royal Canadian Air Force (RCAF), the Canadian firm began building fuselages, which were exported to the UK for completion. Canadian-built Tiger Moths featured modifications to better suit the local climate, along with a reinforced tail wheel, hand-operated brakes (built by Bendix Corporation), shorter undercarriage radius rods, and the legs of the main landing gear legs being raked forwards as a safeguard against tipping forwards during braking. In addition, the cockpit had a large sliding canopy fitted along with exhaust-based heating; various alternative undercarriage arrangements were also offered. By the end of Canadian production, de Havilland Canada had manufactured a total of 1,548 of all versions, including the DH.82C and American Menasco Pirate-engined variants (with opposing "right-hand"/"counter-clockwise" rotation to the left-hand/clockwise-running Gipsy Major) known as the Menasco Moth; this also included 200 Tiger Moths that were built under wartime United States Army Air Forces (USAAF) Lend-Lease orders, which were designated for paperwork purposes as the PT-24, before being delivered onwards to the RCAF.

Additional overseas manufacturing activity also occurred, most of which took place during wartime. de Havilland Australia assembled an initial batch of 20 aircraft from parts sent from the United Kingdom prior to embarking on their own major production campaign of the DH.82A, which resulted in a total of 1,070 Tiger Moths being constructed in Australia. In late 1940, the first Australian-assembled Tiger Moth conducted its first flight at Bankstown, Sydney. Most Australian aircraft were delivered to the Royal Australian Air Force (RAAF), but several batches were exported, including 18 for the USAAF and 41 for the Royal Indian Air Force.

In New Zealand, 132 Tiger Moths were completed by de Havilland Aircraft of New Zealand; 23 were built in Sweden as the Sk.11' by AB Svenska Järnvägsverkstädernas Aeroplanavdelning, 91 were built in Portugal by OGMA, and another 38 in Norway by Kjeller Flyfabrikk (some sources say 37 so the first may have been assembled from a kit) in addition to a large number of aircraft that were assembled from kits shipped from the UK.

== Operational history ==
=== Introduction ===
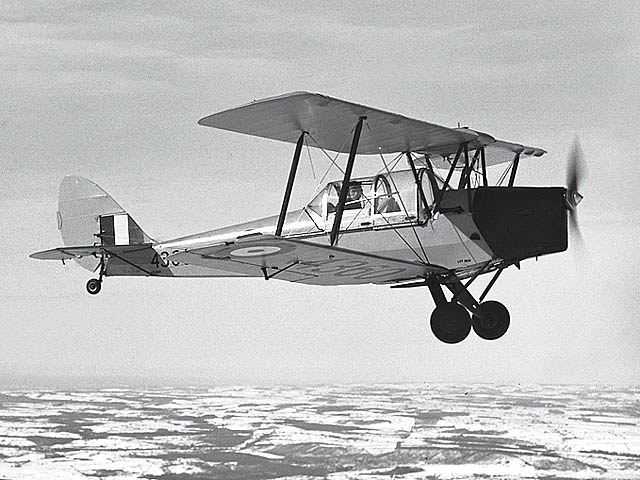
Canadian DH.82C Tiger Moth showing characteristic canopy

The RAF ordered 35 dual-control Tiger Moth Is, which had the company designation DH.82. A subsequent order was placed for 50 aircraft powered by the de Havilland Gipsy Major I engine (130 hp) which was the DH.82A or to the RAF Tiger Moth II. The Tiger Moth entered service at the RAF Central Flying School in February 1932. During the prewar years, increasing numbers of Tiger Moths were procured for the RAF and by overseas customers; by 1939, nearly 40 flying schools operating the type had been established, nine of which operated civilian-register models, as well.

From 1937 onwards, the Tiger Moth was made available to general flying clubs, production having been previously occupied by military customers. The type was used to replace older aircraft in the civilian trainer capacity, such as the older de Havilland Cirrus Moth and Gipsy Moth. By the start of the Second World War, the RAF had around 500 Tiger Moths in service. In addition, nearly all civilian-operated Tiger Moths throughout the Commonwealth were quickly impressed into their respective air forces to meet the wartime demand for trainer aircraft.

=== Training ===
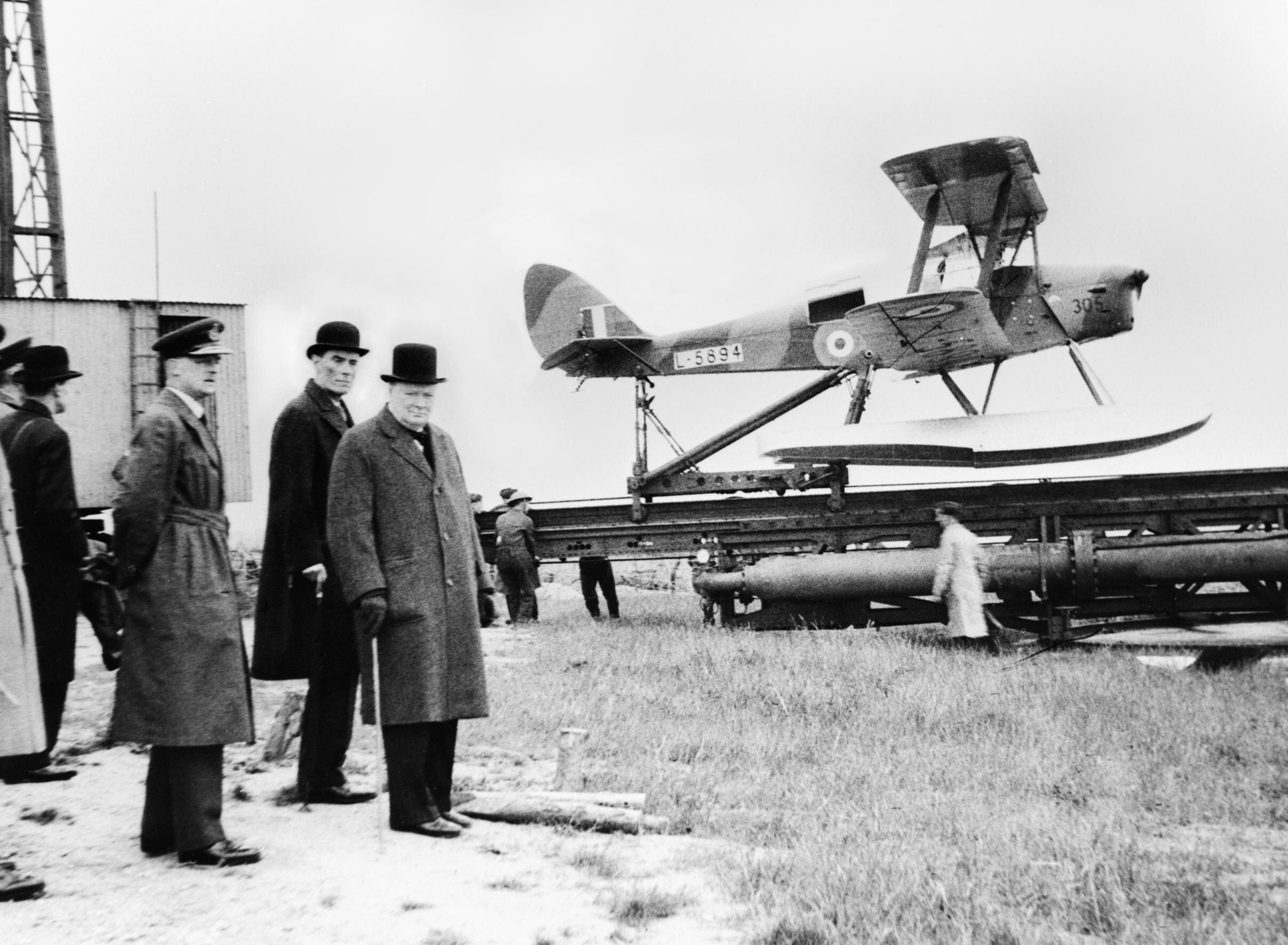
Winston Churchill, David Margesson, and others waiting to watch the launch of a DH.82 Queen Bee target drone, 6 June 1941

The Tiger Moth became the primary trainer throughout the Commonwealth and elsewhere. It was the principal type used in the British Commonwealth Air Training Plan, where thousands of military pilots got their first taste of flight in a Tiger Moth. The RAF found the Tiger Moth's handling ideal for training fighter pilots. Generally docile and forgiving in the normal flight phases encountered during initial training, when used for aerobatic and formation training, the Tiger Moth required skill and concentration to perform well; a botched manoeuvre could cause the aircraft to stall or spin. From 1941 onwards, all military and many civilian Tiger Moths were outfitted with antispin strakes positioned on the junction between the fuselage and the leading edge of the tailplane, known as Mod 11'; later on, the aileron mass balances were removed for improved spin recovery performance.

=== Gunnery target drone ===
In 1935, the DH.82 Queen Bee, a pilotless, radio-controlled variant of the Tiger Moth, appeared for use in training antiaircraft gunners. Use of the word drone, as a generic term for pilotless aircraft, apparently originated from the name and role of the Queen Bee (i.e. the word drone is a reference to the male bee, which makes one flight in search of the female queen bee and then subsequently dies). The DH.82 had a wooden fuselage, based on that of the DH.60 Gipsy Moth (with appropriate structural changes related to cabane strut placement) and the wings of the Tiger Moth II. Queen Bees retained a normal front cockpit for test-flying or ferry flights, but had a radio-control system in the rear cockpit to operate the controls using pneumatically driven servos.

In total, 400 were built by de Havilland at Hatfield and a further 70 by Scottish Aviation. There were nearly 300 in service at the start of the Second World War.

=== Coastal patrol ===
In December 1939, owing to a shortage of maritime patrol aircraft, six flights of Tiger Moths were operated by RAF Coastal Command for surveillance flights over coastal waters, known as "scarecrow patrols". The aircraft operated in pairs and were armed only with a Very pistol. The intention was to force any encroaching U-boat to dive; one aircraft would then remain in the vicinity while the other would search for a naval patrol vessel that could be led back to the spot. Because they were not radio equipped, each aircraft also carried a pair of homing pigeons in a wicker basket to call for help in case of a forced landing at sea. A 25-lb (11.5 kg) bomb was sometimes carried, but no record shows one being dropped in action.

=== Anti-invasion preparations ===
In the aftermath of Britain's disastrous campaign in France, in August 1940 three proposals for beach defence systems were put forward; 350 Tiger Moths were fitted with bomb racks to serve as light bombers as a part of Operation Banquet. A more radical conversion involved the "paraslasher", a scythe-like blade fitted to a Tiger Moth and intended to cut parachutists' canopies as they descended. Flight tests proved the idea, but it was not officially adopted. The Tiger Moth was also tested as a dispenser of Paris green rat poison for use against ground troops, with powder dispensers located under the wings.

=== Postwar ===
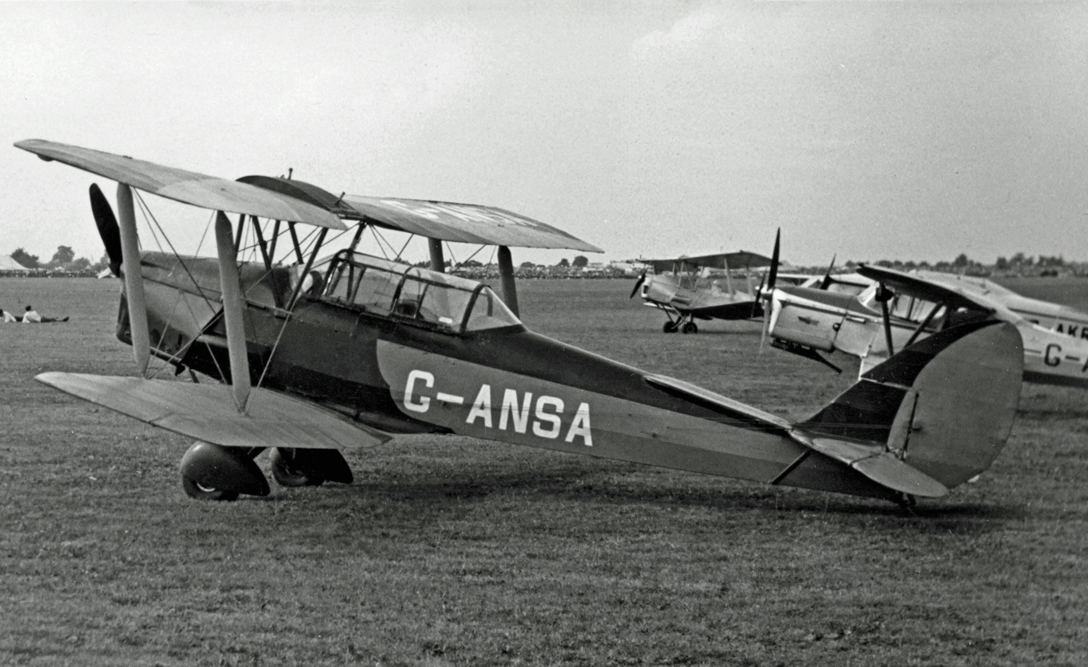
Tiger Moth Coupe with spatted undercarriage at Coventry Airport in 1955

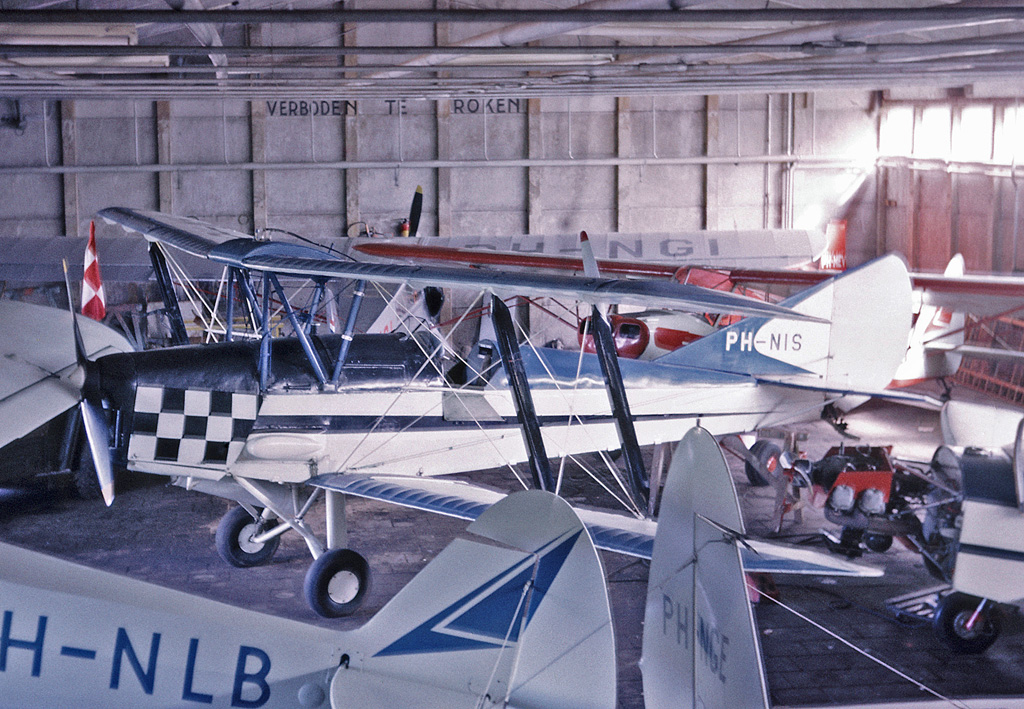
A Dutch Tiger Moth at Hilversum Airport in 1967 has the extended fin area required by the Dutch authorities

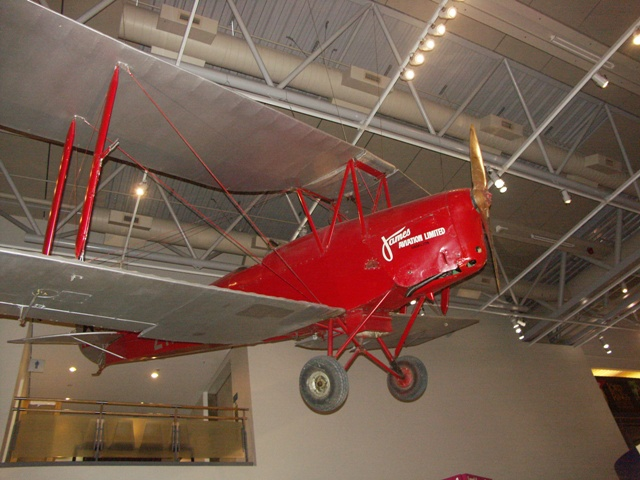
Early aerial topdressing conversion of the Tiger Moth at the Museum of New Zealand Te Papa Tongarewa in 2009

In the postwar climate, impressed Tiger Moths were restored to their former civilian operations and owners. Accordingly, large numbers of Tiger Moths were made available for sale to flying clubs and individuals. Relatively few new light aircraft were being manufactured at the time to take its place. Due to the type being inexpensive to operate and the aforementioned factors, the Tiger Moth was met with an enthusiastic reception across the civilian market. Additionally, it was put to use for new roles, including aerial advertising, aerial ambulance, aerobatic performer, crop dusting, and glider tug work.

In the air-racing market, Tiger Moths were converted to a single-seat configuration, often temporarily. Several aircraft were extensively modified for greater speed; these changes included alterations such as the removal of the centre-section fuel tank, alternative fuel tank configurations, all-new elevators, custom-designed fuel injectors, and the recovering of the fuselage with lighter-weight fabric. Three particular aircraft, G-APDZ, G-ANZZ and G-ANMZ, were accordingly rebuilt and were used in international competitions; the design changes led to substantially improved performance during inverted flight.

Ex-RAF examples were imported to the Netherlands during the postwar era and used to equip the Dutch National Flying School at Ypenburg. These aircraft were required by the Dutch civil aviation authorities to be fitted with a larger dorsal fin, incorporating an extended forward fillet to the fin, to provide for additional area; this requirement was also extended to privately owned Tiger Moths in the Netherlands.

The Tiger Moth might be confused at first glance with the Belgian-designed Stampe SV.4 aerobatic aircraft, which had a very similar design layout; both aircraft made use of a similar main landing gear configuration, a slightly sweepback wing, and an alike engine/cowling design. Several Tiger Moths were converted during the 1950s to a Coupe standard, which involved the installation of a sliding canopy over both crew positions, not unlike the Canadian-built Fleet Finch biplane trainers that had worked beside the Tiger Moth in RCAF service as trainers in Canada during the type's wartime years.

After the development of aerial topdressing in New Zealand, large numbers of ex-Royal New Zealand Air Force Tiger Moths built in that country and in the United Kingdom were converted into agricultural aircraft; at the time, this was a pioneering use for aircraft. In this role, the front seat was commonly replaced with a hopper to hold superphosphate for aerial topdressing. A large number were also used to deploy insecticide in the crop-sprayer role, for which several alternative arrangements, including perforated piping being installed underneath the mainplanes or the placement of rotary atomisers on the lower mainplane, were used.

Royal Navy Tiger Moths used as target tugs and "air experience" machines became the last military examples when that service purchased a batch of refurbished ex-civilian examples in 1956. One became the last biplane to land on an aircraft carrier (HMS Eagle) in the English Channel during the summer of 1967. On takeoff, the wind over the deck allowed the aircraft to fly, but it was slower than the carrier, which turned hard to starboard to avoid a possible collision. These planes remained in service until the early 1970s.

The Tiger Moth (and to a lesser extent, the similar Belgian Stampe-Vertongen SV.4) had been often used as a stand-in for rarer aircraft in films, sometimes having been extensively modified to outwardly resemble the aircraft it was depicting. Three aircraft were converted by Croydon-based Film Aviation Services Ltd for use in the filming of the 1962 movie Lawrence of Arabia; one Tiger Moth became a replica of a Fokker D.VII, while two aircraft resembled the Rumpler C.V to depict these types for the film. Several Tiger Moths were used in the crash scenes in The Great Waldo Pepper, standing in for the Curtiss JN-1. Due to the popularity of the design and the rising cost of flyable examples, a number of replicas (scale and full-sized) have been designed for the homebuilder; these include the Fisher R-80 Tiger Moth and the RagWing RW22 Tiger Moth.

== Flying characteristics ==
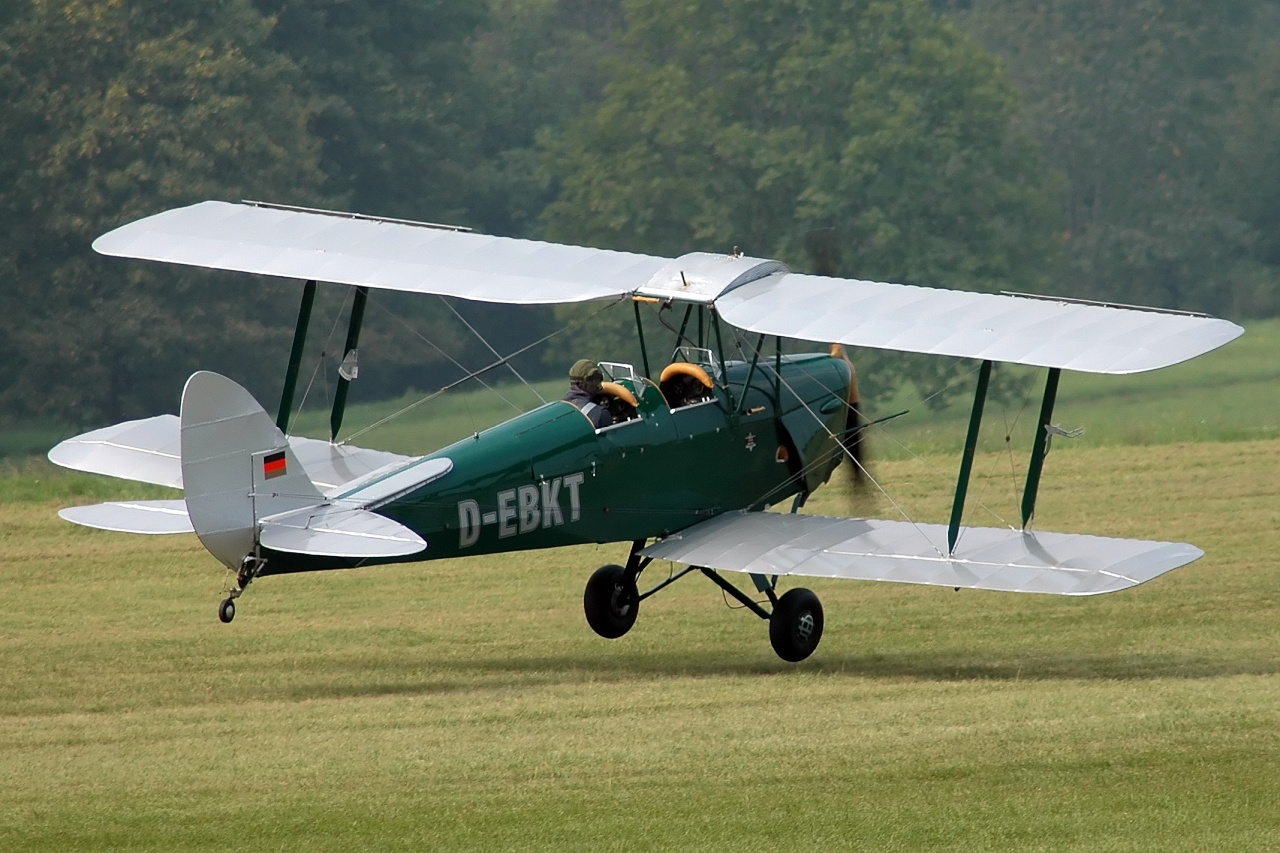
DH.82A Tiger Moth in 2005

The Tiger Moth responds well to control inputs and is fairly easy to fly for a tail-dragger. Its big "parachute" wings are very forgiving, and it stalls at a speed as slow as 25 knots with power. Its stall and spin characteristics are benign. It has some adverse yaw and therefore requires rudder input during turns. The Tiger Moth exhibits the fundamental requirements of a training aircraft, in being "easy to fly, but difficult to fly well"; the aircraft's benign handling when within its limits make it easy for the novice to learn the basic skills of flight. At the same time techniques such as coordinated flight must be learnt and used effectively, and the aircraft will show up mishandling to an observant instructor or attentive pupil. As training progresses towards more advanced areas, especially aerobatics, the skill required on the part of a Tiger Moth pilot increases. The aircraft will not, like some training aircraft, "fly its way out of trouble" but will instead stall or spin if mishandled. However the stall and spin remain benign, again showing up deficient piloting without endangering the aircraft or the crew. These characteristics were invaluable to military operators, who must identify between pilots with the potential to go on to fly fighter aircraft, those more suited to lower-performance machines and those who must be relegated to non-pilot aircrew positions.

Because the Tiger Moth has no electrical system, it must be started by hand. Being a tail-dragging biplane, taxiing also requires care. The pilot cannot see directly ahead, so the lower wing can hit obstructions, and it is susceptible to gusts of wind on its inclined, large, upper wing.

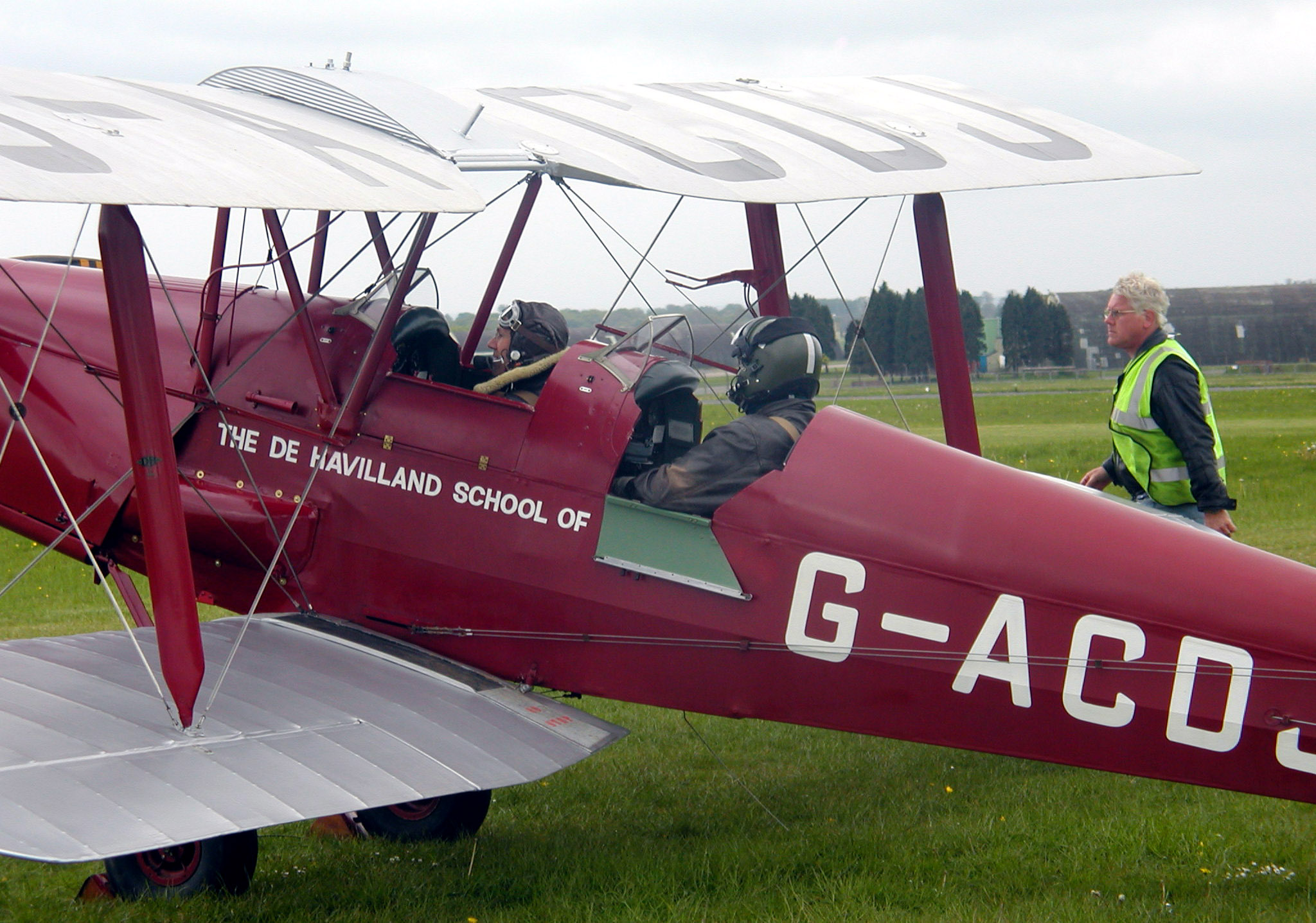
A 1933-built Tiger Moth

The takeoff is uneventful, and it has a reasonable rate of climb. However full power should not be maintained for more than a minute to avoid damaging the engine.

The Tiger Moth's biplane design makes it strong, and it is fully aerobatic. However it has ailerons only on its bottom wing, which makes its rate of roll relatively slow for a biplane; and, as stated previously, the ailerons on a Tiger Moth normally operate with a heavy degree of designed-in differential operation (mostly deflecting up, hardly at all downwards) to avoid adverse yaw problems in normal flight. Most manoeuvres are started at about 90 to 110 knots, and it has a Velocity Never Exceeded (VNE) of 140 knots. It is important to lock the automatic slats (leading edge flaps) during aerobatic manoeuvres.

There are two methods of landing. "Wheeler" landing involves pushing the plane on to the runway at a moderate speed with just the main wheels on the ground, with the tail held up until speed reduces. It does not tend to bounce. Unlike most taildraggers, slow speed three-point landings are quite difficult because there is not enough elevator authority to bring the tail down to the correct three-point attitude. This means that the tail needs to be brought down sharply at just the right speed in order for the angular momentum to carry it down sufficiently.

The open cockpit allows pilots to move their heads over the side to see the runway during approach and landing. As the aircraft is a tail dragger, it is essential to land it straight with no sideways movement, to avoid ground loops.

One often undocumented feature is that the carburettor de-icing mechanism is activated automatically when the throttle is reduced. This means that when an engine is running poorly due to ice the pilot must reduce power even further and then wait for the ice to melt.

== Variants ==
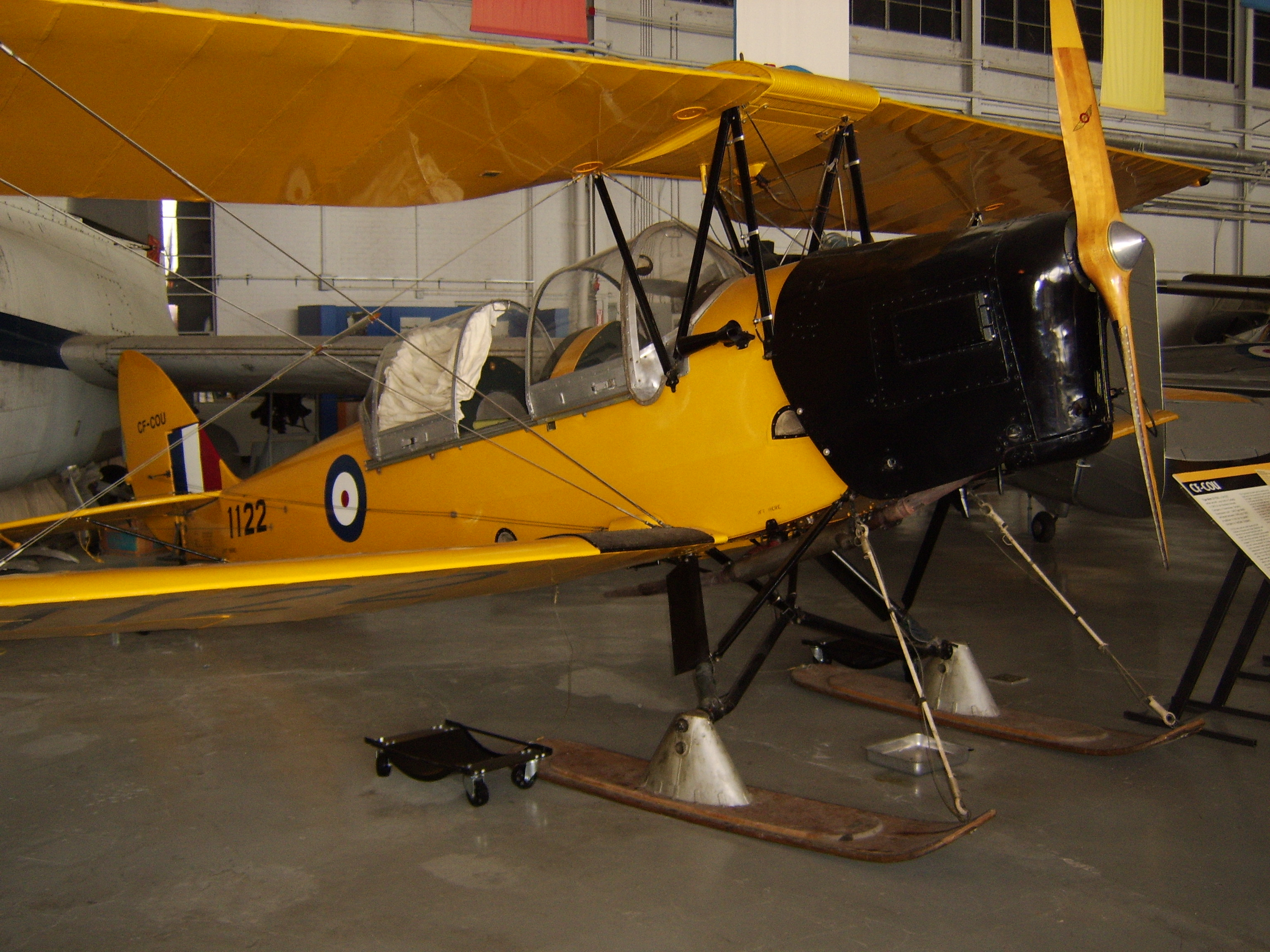
de Havilland Canada DH.82C in Commonwealth Air Training Plan "trainer yellow" at the Western Canada Aviation Museum (note the skis)

DH.60T Moth Trainer/Tiger Moth
Military training version of the De Havilland DH.60 Moth. First eight prototype DH.82 configuration aircraft were named Tiger Moth.
DH.82 Tiger Moth (Tiger Moth I)
Two-seat primary trainer aircraft. Powered by a 120 hp (89 kW) de Havilland Gipsy III piston engine; renamed Tiger Moth I in RAF.
DH.82A Tiger Moth (Tiger Moth II)
Two-seat primary trainer aircraft. Powered by a 130 hp (97 kW) de Havilland Gipsy Major piston engine and fitted with a hood over the rear cockpit for blind flying instruction. Named Tiger Moth II in RAF.
DH.82B Tiger Moth III
Improved variant with a de Havilland Gipsy Major III engine, it had a wider fuselage and larger fin. First flown on 1 October 1939 only one was built. In some references the designation is erroneously applied to the Queen Bee.
DH.82C Tiger Moth
Cold weather operations version for the RCAF. Fitted with sliding perspex canopies, cockpit heating, brakes, tail wheels and metal struts. Wheels were moved forwards by 9.75" to compensate for the installation of brakes by changing the angle of the undercarriage legs. Powered by a 145 hp (108 kW) de Havilland Gipsy Major piston engine. 1,523 built (including Menasco Moths and PT-24).
DH.82C-2 Menasco Moth I
DH.82C fitted with Menasco D-4 Super Pirate 125 hp inline inverted 4-cylinder engine due to shortages of Gipsy Major engines. Because of the reduction in power, they were used primarily as radio trainers. Externally distinguishable from 82C by opposite rotation of propeller and reversal of the cowling openings. 10 built.
DH.82C-4 Menasco Moth II
As DH.82C-2 but with reduced fuel capacity and further detail alterations. One example survives and is on display at Canada Aviation and Space Museum in Ottawa. 125 built.
DH.82C-4 Menasco Moth III
Fitted with American AT-1/AR-2 radio and intended as a radio trainer from outset but project cancelled when shortages of British radios and engines was resolved. The sole example, RCAF 4934 was converted from Menasco Moth II.

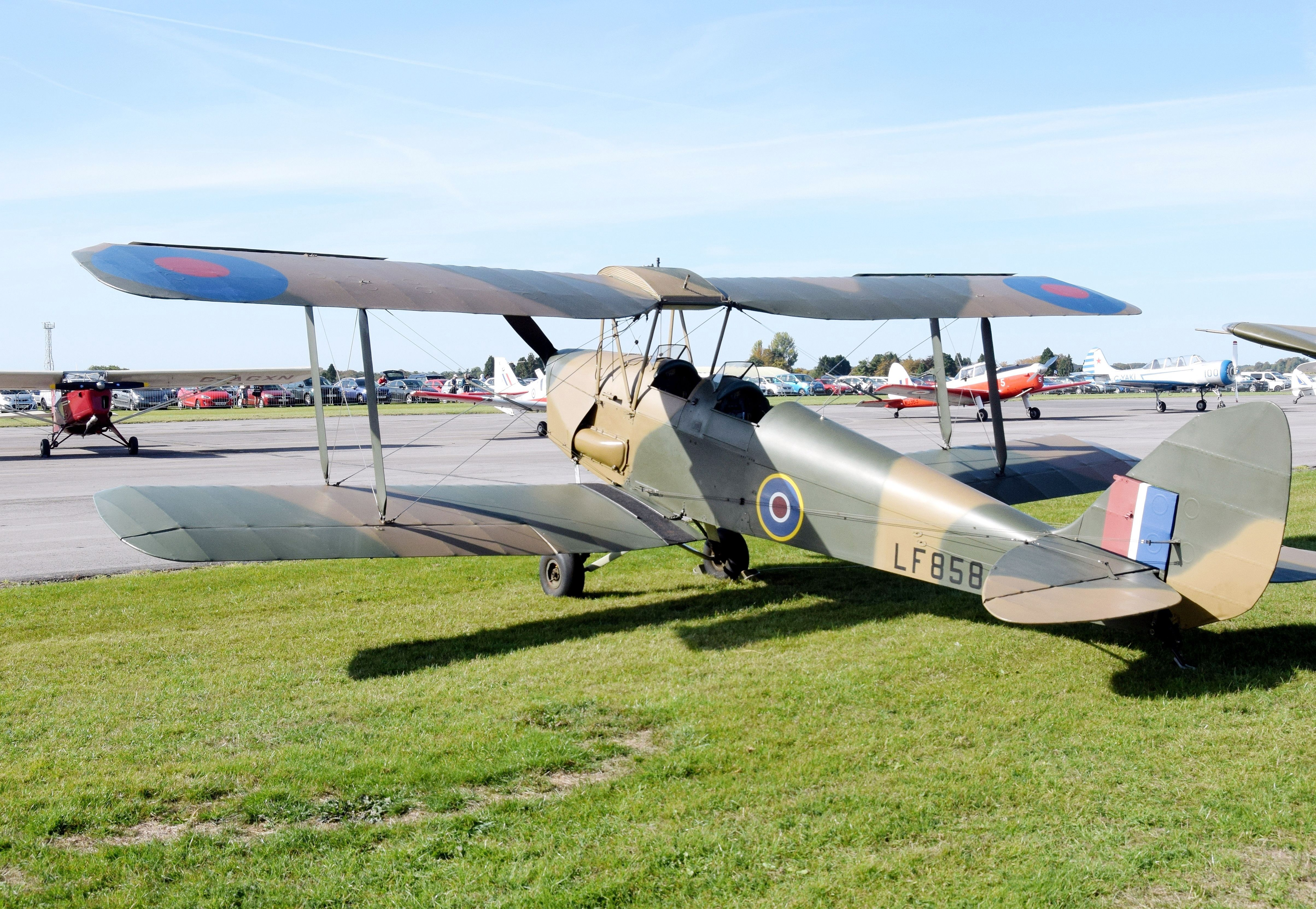
Privately owned ex-RAF 1944 de Havilland DH.82B Queen Bee in England

DH.82 Queen Bee
A target drone for anti-aircraft gunnery training. It could be flown unmanned under radio-control, but was also fitted with a cockpit so it could be flown by a pilot. Tiger Moth wings were used and, to reduce cost, a wooden fuselage based on that of the DH.60 Moth (but with the structural changes associated with the cabane struts having been relocated as per the standard Tiger Moth) was used. Between 1935 and 1943, 412 were built in float and wheeled versions. As of 2008, the sole remaining airworthy Queen Bee resided at RAF Henlow, England.
PT-24 Moth
United States military designation for the DH.82C ordered for Lend-Lease to the Royal Canadian Air Force; 200 were built by de Havilland Canada.
Thruxton Jackaroo

Four-seat cabin biplane, modified from existing DH.82A airframes by widening the gap between the fuselage longerons. 19 were converted in the United Kingdom.
DH.83 Fox Moth
Used many Tiger Moth components including wings (rerigged to remove sweep), tail and undercarriage with a new fuselage featuring an enclosed cabin for the passengers, and an open cockpit for the pilot. Built in both the United Kingdom before the Second World War and in Canada after the war.
I2H
Brazilian Navy designation of the DH.82.
I2H1
Brazilian Navy designation of the DH.82A.
B.F.10
(Thai: บ.ฝ.๑๐) Royal Thai Armed Forces designation for the Tiger Moth Mk.II.

== Operators ==
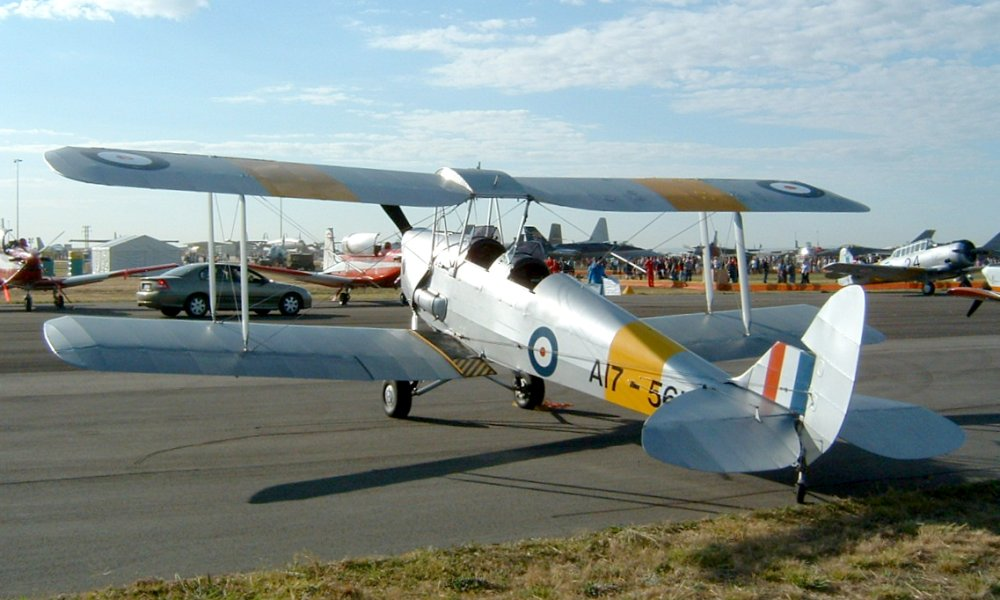
DH.82A Tiger Moth in RAAF markings

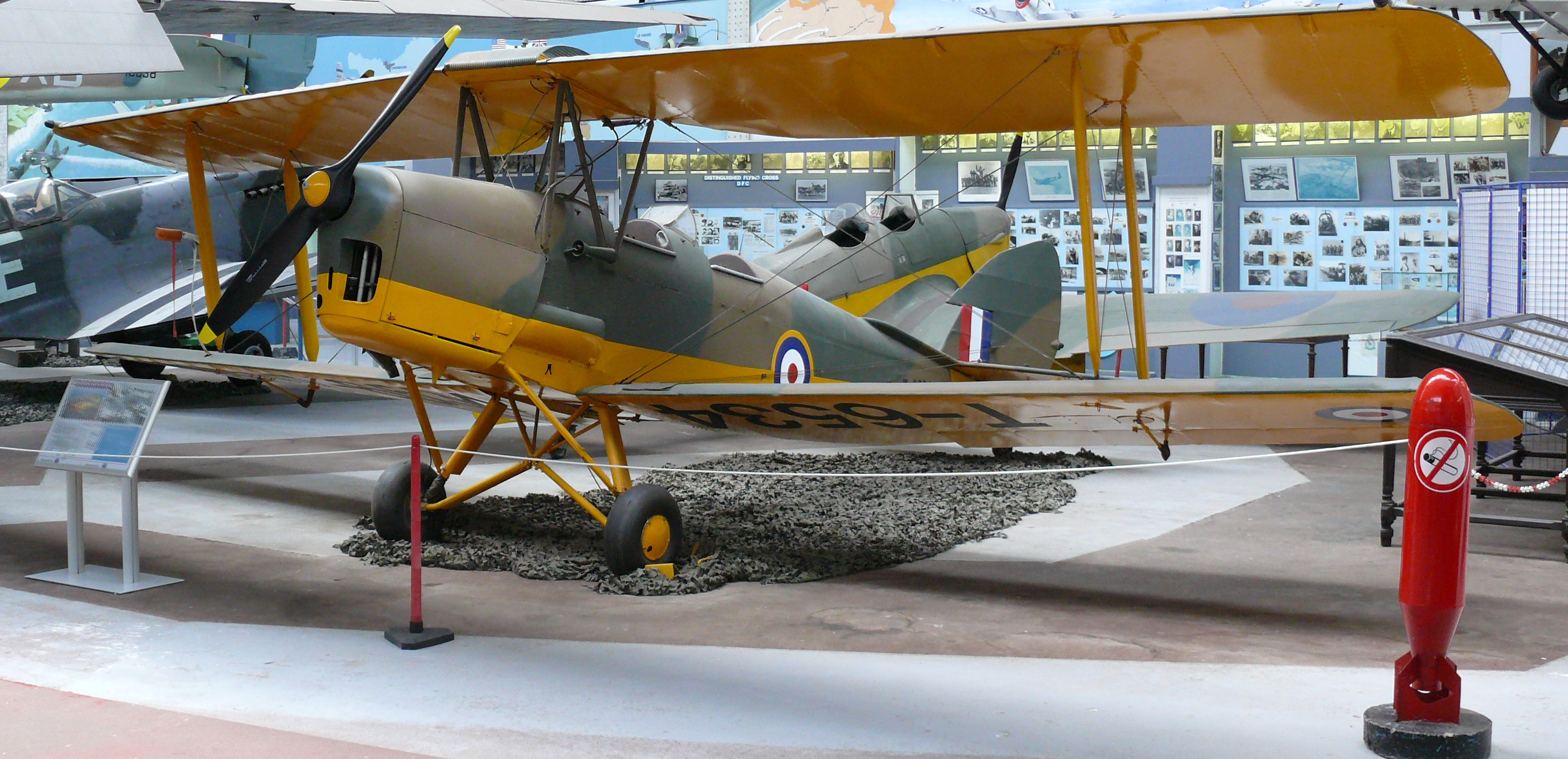
Tiger Moth, Royal Museum of the Armed Forces and Military History, Brussels, Belgium (2011)

=== Military operators ===
Australia

- Royal Australian Air Force
- Royal Australian Navy – Fleet Air Arm (RAN).

Belgium

- Belgian Air Force (31 operated from 1945)

Brazil

- Brazilian Air Force
- Brazilian Naval Aviation

Burma

- Burma Volunteer Air Force
- Burma Air Force

Canada

- Royal Canadian Air Force
- Royal Canadian Navy

Ceylon

- Royal Ceylon Air Force

Democratic Republic of Congo

- Force Aérienne Congolaise

Czechoslovakia

- Czechoslovak Air Force – One aircraft in service from 1945 to 1948.

Denmark

- Royal Danish Air Force

Egypt
Finland

- Finnish Air Force

France

- French Air Force

Vichy France

- Vichy French Air Force

Nazi Germany

- Luftwaffe (small numbers)

Kingdom of Greece

- Royal Hellenic Air Force

British Raj

- Royal Indian Air Force

India

- Indian Air Force The Tiger Moth served as the primary basic trainer for the Indian Air Force during its formative decades. Thousands of Indian pilots received their first flying experience on this aircraft between the 1930s and 1950s.

Pahlavi Iran

- Imperial Iranian Air Force- 99 imported and 10 built locally in 1938–39

Iraq

- Iraqi Air Force

Israel

- Israeli Air Force, and its pre-state organisations
- Palavir
- Sherut Avir

Jordan

- Royal Jordanian Air Force

Malaya

- Malaya Auxiliary Air Force

Netherlands

- Royal Netherlands Air Force
- Dutch Naval Aviation Service

Dutch East Indies

- Vrijwillige Vliegers Corps

New Zealand

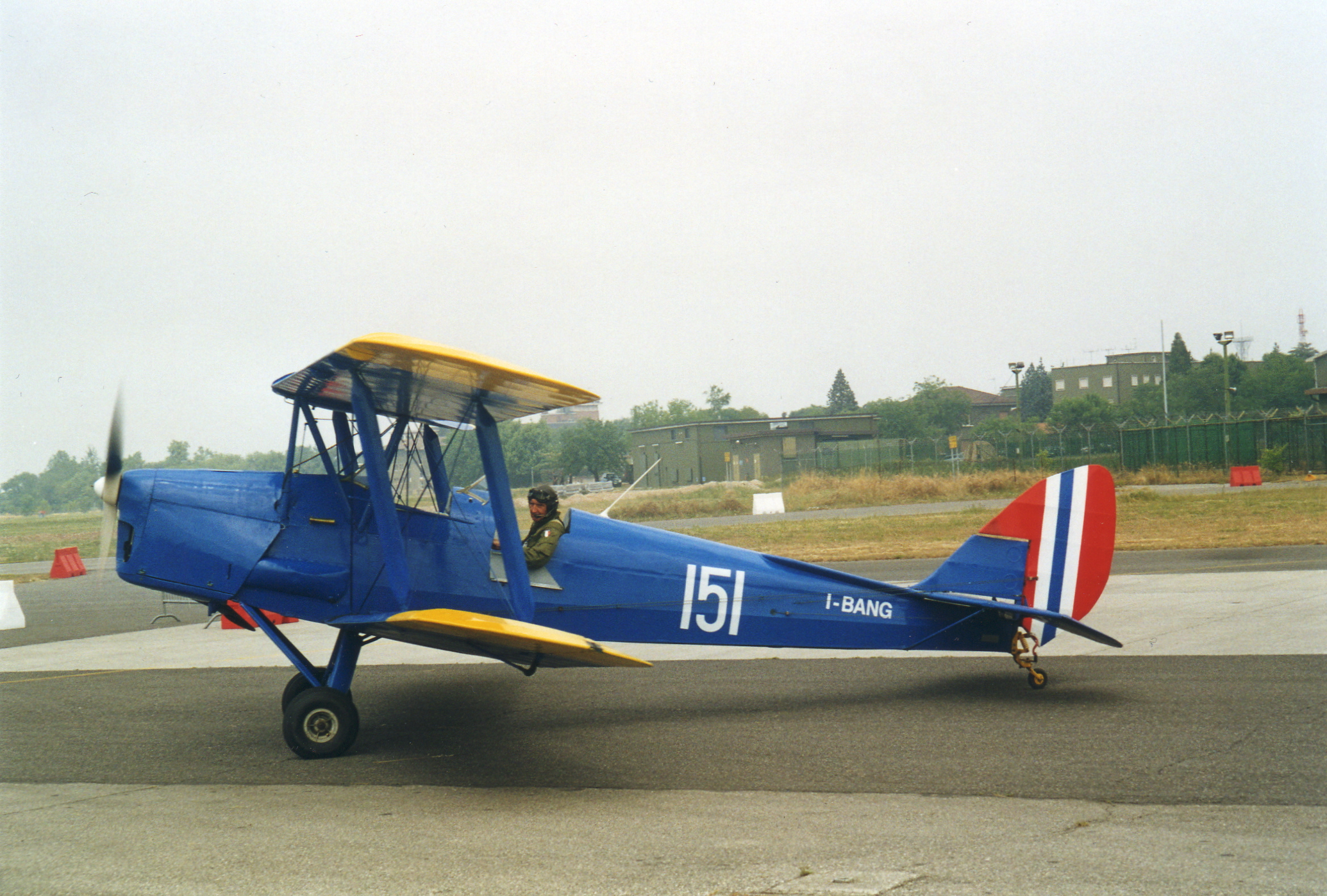
DH.82A Tiger Moth in Royal Norwegian Air Force markings

- Royal New Zealand Air Force
  - No. 1 Squadron RNZAF
  - No. 2 Squadron RNZAF
  - No. 3 Squadron RNZAF
  - No. 4 Squadron RNZAF
  - No. 42 Squadron RNZAF

Norway

- Norwegian Army Air Service

Pakistan

- Pakistan Air Force

Poland

- Polish Air Force (1 bought for tests before 1939)
- Polish Air Force in Great Britain

Portugal

- Portuguese Army Aviation
- Portuguese Naval Aviation
- Portuguese Air Force

Rhodesia

- Rhodesian Air Force

Saudi Arabia

- Royal Saudi Air Force

Spanish Republic

- Spanish Republican Air Force

Spanish State

- Spanish Air Force

South Africa

- South African Air Force

Southern Rhodesia

- Southern Rhodesian Air Force

Sri Lanka

- Sri Lankan Air Force

Sweden

- Swedish Air Force

Thailand

- Royal Thai Air Force
- Royal Thai Navy

United Kingdom

- Royal Air Force
  - No. 24 Squadron RAF
  - No. 27 Squadron RAF
  - No. 52 Squadron RAF
  - No. 81 Squadron RAF
  - No. 116 Squadron RAF
  - No. 297 Squadron RAF
  - No. 510 Squadron RAF
  - No. 612 Squadron RAF
  - No. 613 Squadron RAF
  - No. 652 Squadron RAF
  - No. 653 Squadron RAF
  - No. 654 Squadron RAF
  - No. 656 Squadron RAF
  - No. 663 Squadron RAF
  - No. 668 Squadron RAF
  - No. 669 Squadron RAF
  - No. 670 Squadron RAF
  - No. 671 Squadron RAF
  - No. 672 Squadron RAF
  - No. 673 Squadron RAF
- Fleet Air Arm

United States

- United States Army Air Forces

Uruguay

- Uruguayan Air Force 18 DH 82 Tiger Moths operated in the Military Aeronautics between 1935 and 1949.

Yugoslavia

- SFR Yugoslav Air Force – 24 aircraft
  - 2nd Training Aviation Regiment (1945–1948)

=== Civil operators ===
The aircraft is operated by many private individuals and flying clubs.

== Surviving aircraft ==
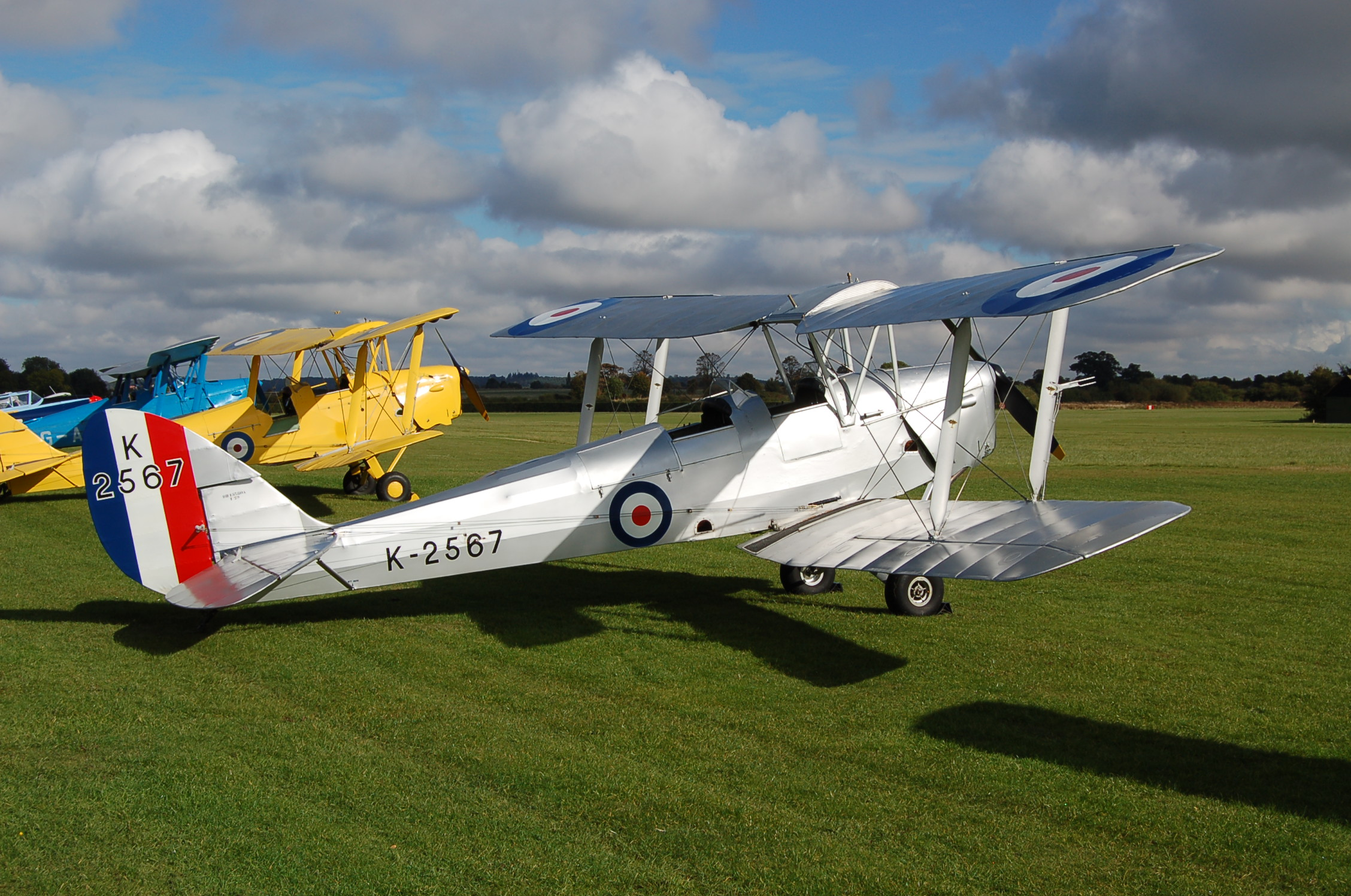
Tiger Moth K2567 (G-MOTH), in 2012. (Part of the Russavia collection in 1993.)

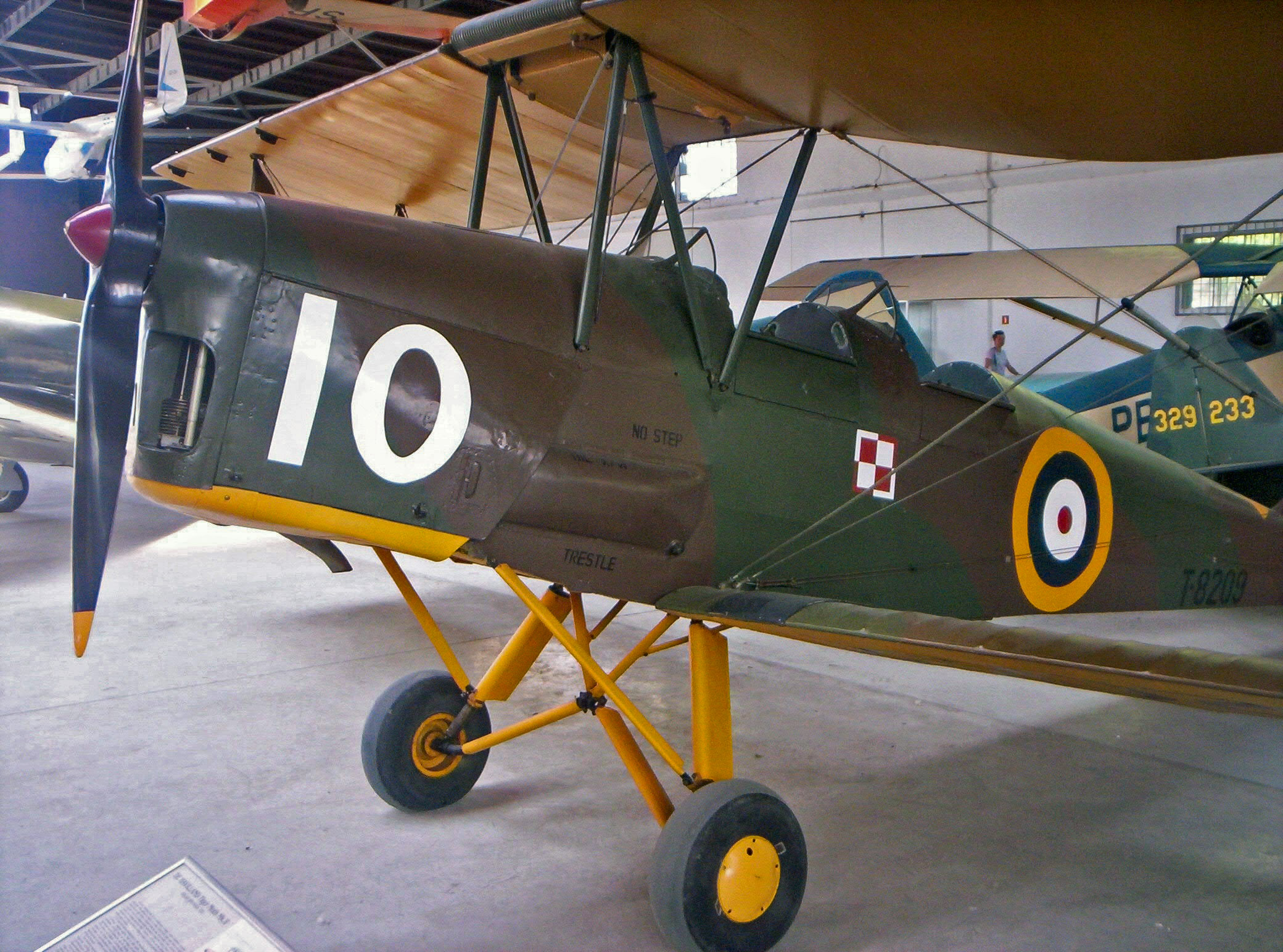
Tiger Moth II preserved at the Polish Aviation Museum, 2006

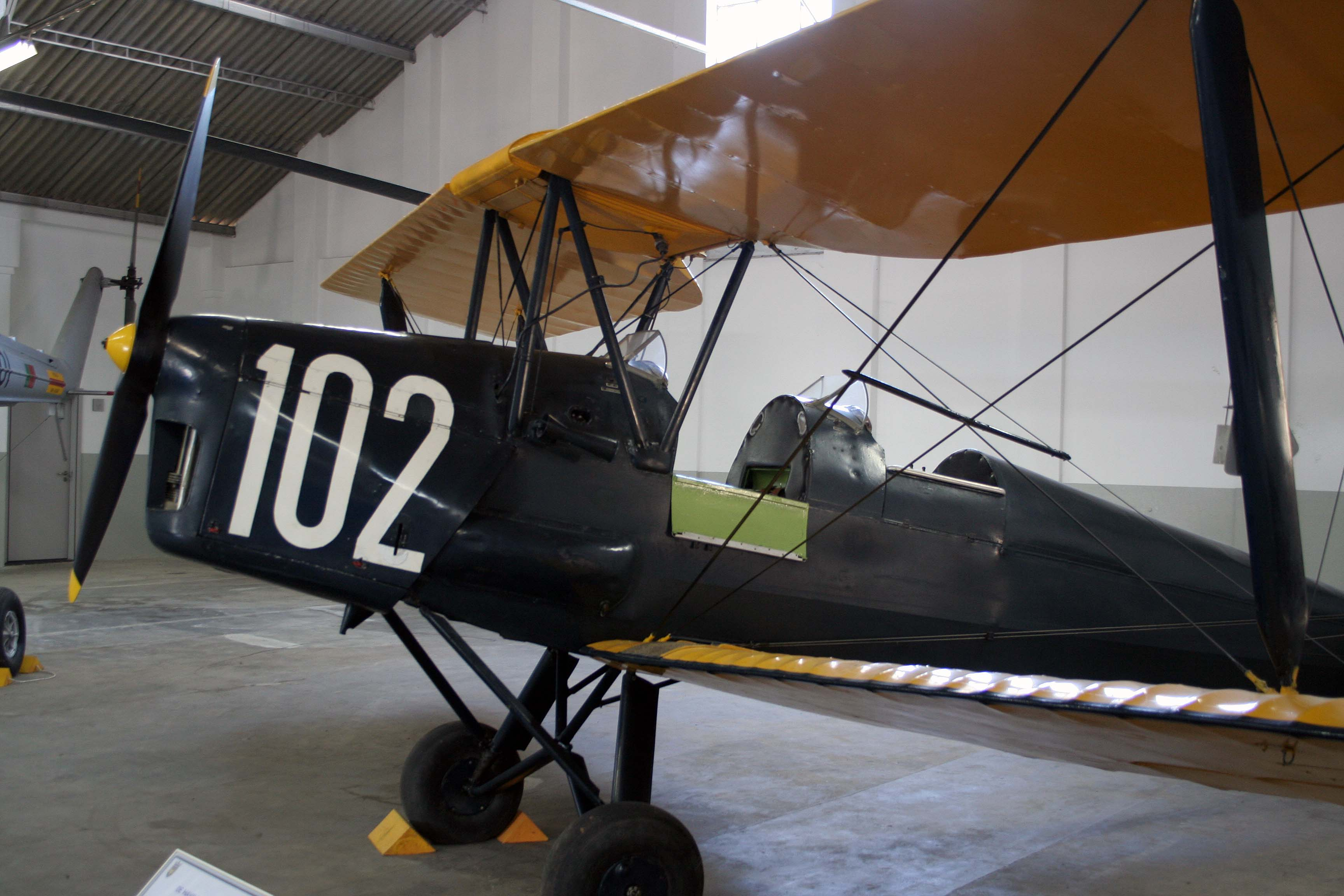
Portuguese de Havilland DH-82 Tiger Moth at the Museu do Ar (Portuguese Air Force Museum)

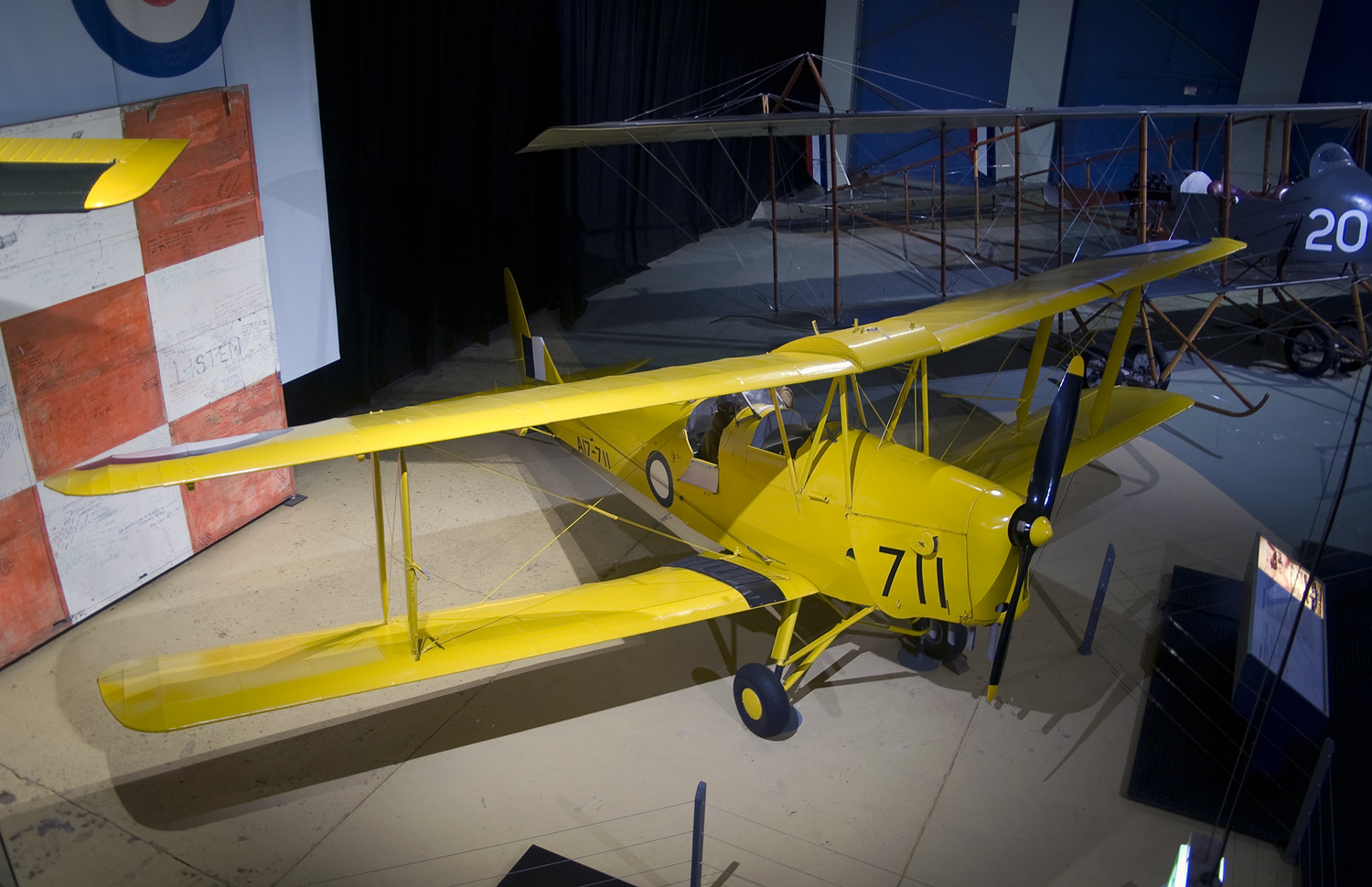
de Havilland Tiger Moth (A17-711) in Second World War training colours at the RAAF Museum.

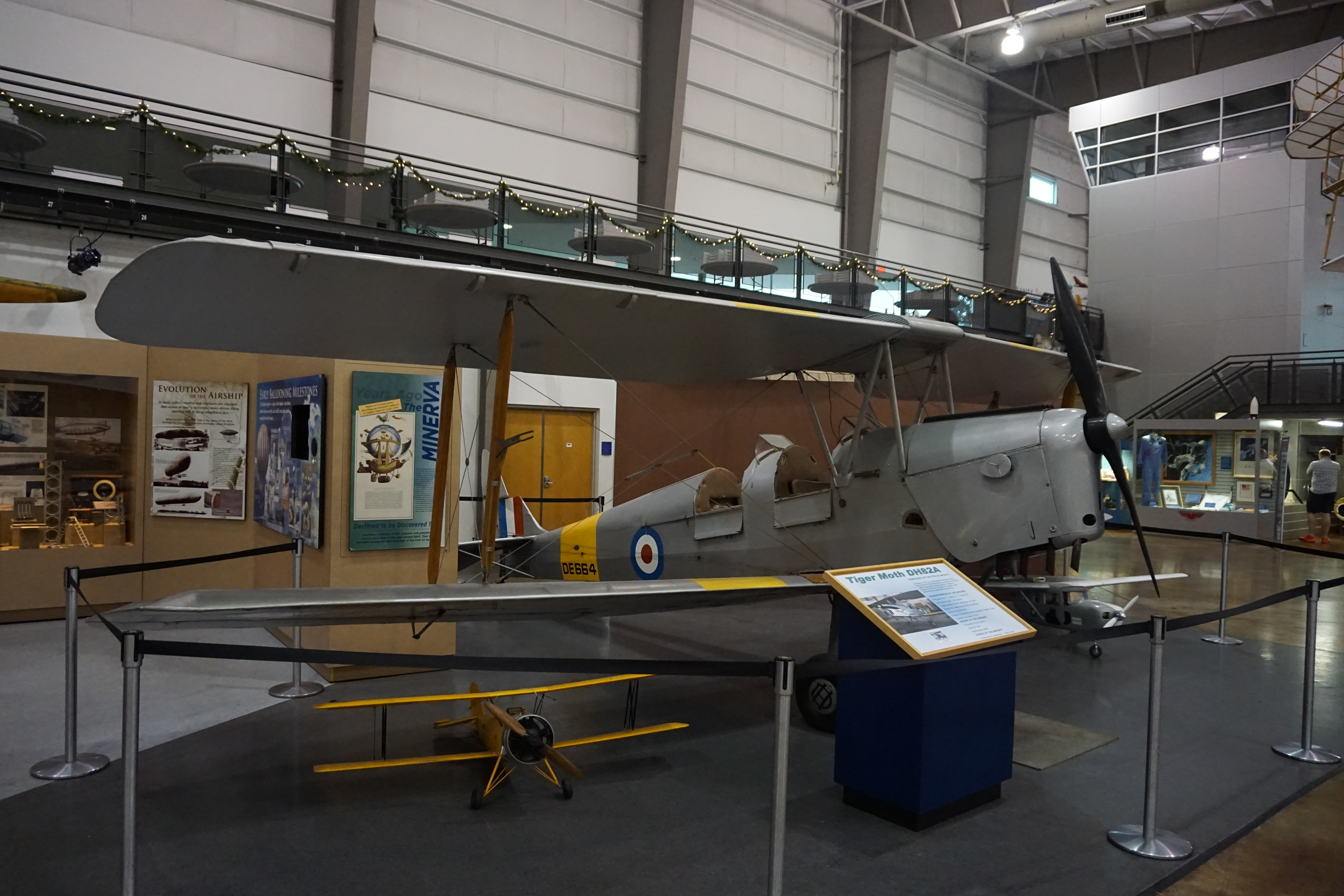
A de Havilland Tiger Moth at the Frontiers of Flight Museum

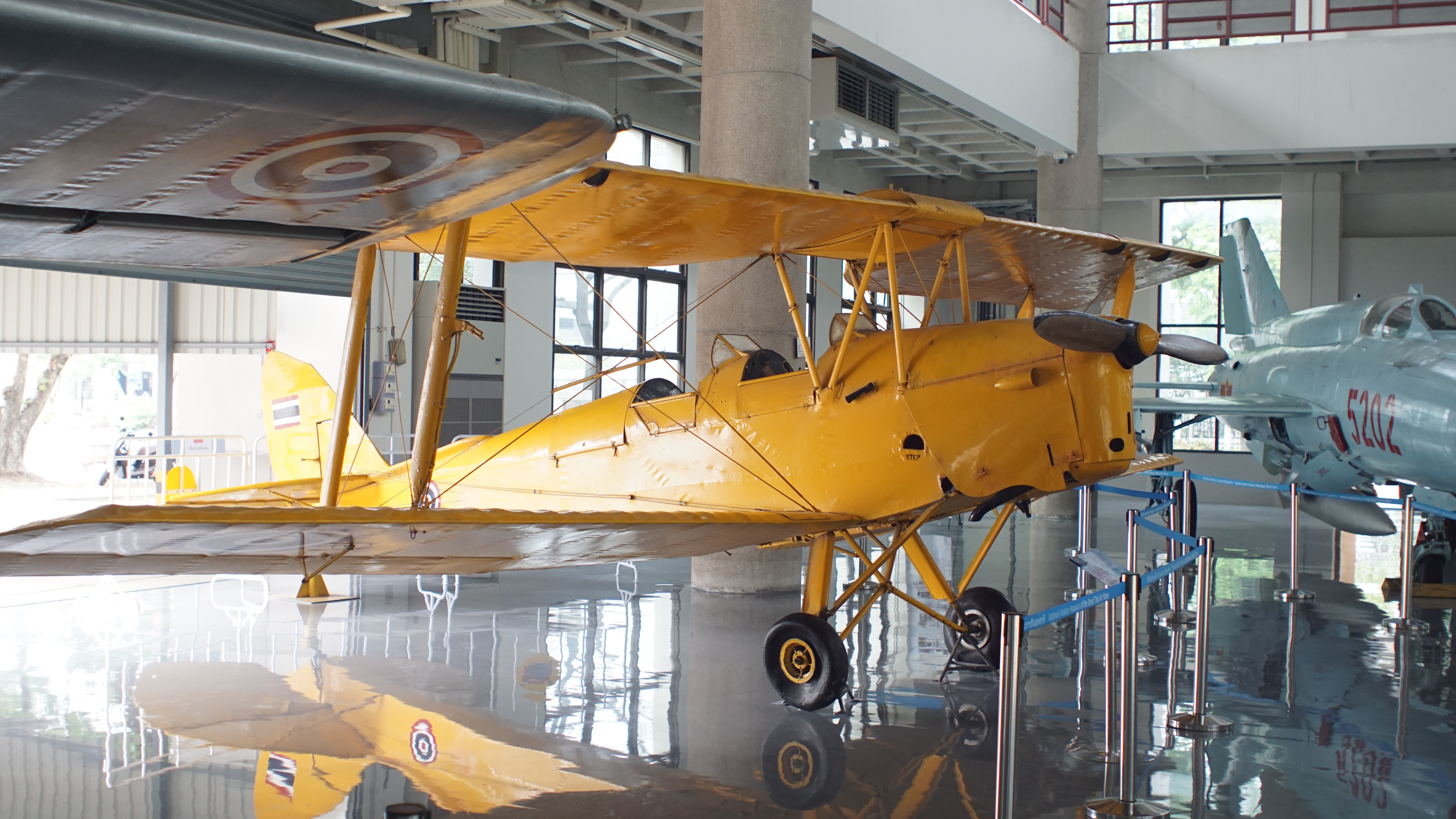
De Havilland Tiger Moth in The Royal Thai Air Force Museum

Numerous examples of the Tiger Moth are still flying today (an estimated 250). The number of airworthy Tiger Moths has increased as previously neglected aircraft (or those previously only used for static display in museums) have been restored.

A number of aircraft have been preserved as museum displays (amongst others) at the:

- Alberta Aviation Museum, Edmonton, Canada
- Aviodrome at Lelystad Airport in The Netherlands
- Canadian Air and Space Museum, Toronto, Canada
- Canada Aviation and Space Museum, Ottawa, Canada – two examples, 1 on display, 1 stored
- Canadian Aviation Museum, Windsor, Canada
- Canadian Museum of Flight, Langley, Canada
- Canadian Warplane Heritage Museum, Hamilton, Canada
- Commonwealth Air Training Plan Museum, Brandon, Manitoba, Canada
- de Havilland Aircraft Museum in London Colney, England
- EAA AirVenture Museum, Oshkosh, United States
- Edenvale Classic Aircraft Foundation, Edenvale, Ontario, Canada. Flying C-GSTP ex- RAF NM201,
- Flygvapenmuseum at Malmen Airbase near Linköping, Sweden
- The Hangar Flight Museum, Calgary, Canada
- Hellenic Air Force Museum, Tatoi. Greece
- Imperial War Museum Duxford, United Kingdom
- Indian Air Force Museum, Palam – 1 Airworthy Example for Vintage Flight Squadron
- Israeli Air Force Museum, Hatzerim, Israel
- Kbely Aviation Museum, Prague, Czech Republic
- Luskintyre Aviation Flying Museum, Luskintyre, New South Wales, Australia – Tiger Moth restorers and builders
- Mackay Tiger Moth Museum, Mackay, Australia
- Malta Aviation Museum in Malta
- Museo Aeronáutico "Coronel (Aviador) Jaime Meregalli" in Uruguay
- Museo Nacional Aeronáutico y del Espacio in Chile
- Museu Aeroespacial, 25 km outside Rio de Janeiro in Brazil
- Museu do Ar, Sintra, Portugal
- Museum of New Zealand Te Papa Tongarewa in Wellington, New Zealand
- National Museum of Flight at RAF East Fortune in Scotland
- National Museum of the United States Air Force, Dayton, Ohio, United States
- North Atlantic Aviation Museum in Gander, Newfoundland, Canada
- Old Rhinebeck Aerodrome in Rhinebeck/Red Hook, New York, United States
- PAF Museum, Karachi, Pakistan
- Polish Aviation Museum at the former Kraków-Rakowice-Czyżyny Airport in Poland
- RAAF Museum, RAAF Williams Point Cook, Australia
- Reynolds-Alberta Museum in Wetaskiwin, Canada
- Royal Museum of the Armed Forces and of Military History, Brussels, Belgium
- Royal Aero Club of Western Australia, Perth, Australia - Airworthy aircraft "Shirley Adkins", VH-CKF, used for hire and joyflights
- Royal New Zealand Air Force Museum, Wigram, New Zealand – 1 airworthy aircraft for historic flight
- Royal Newcastle Aero Club, Rutherford, NSW, Australia – scenic and aerobatic joyflights in VH-RNI
- Royal Thai Air Force Museum, Bangkok, Thailand
- Saskatchewan Aviation Museum, Saskatoon, Saskatchewan, Canada. - Airworthy aircraft used for scenic flights and museum events.
- Saskatchewan Western Development Museum, Moose Jaw, Canada
- Shuttleworth Collection at Old Warden, England
- Solent Sky Museum, Southampton, England
- Sri Lanka Air Force Museum, Sri Lanka
- Temora Aviation Museum, Temora, Australia
- Tiger Boys' Aeroplane Works & Flying Museum, Guelph, Ont. Canada
- The Tiger Club, Upminster, Essex, UK
- Vintage Wings of Canada, Gatineau, Qc. Canada
- Western Canada Aviation Museum in Winnipeg, Canada
- Yugoslav Aeronautical Museum, Serbia

=== Privately owned ===
Tiger Moths, type if known, and any history of the airframe:

- William N. Thibault of Newport Beach, CA owns a registered 1935 Tiger Moth DH82A with a Gypsy Moth engine. There are confirmed sightings of the aircraft at the Watsonville Municipal Airport in CA and Gillespie Field in El Cajon CA. The most recent photos of the aircraft have it flying out of the Santa Ynez CA airport. It might have been previously owned by the Royal Air Force of the UK and Fuerza Aerea Uruguaya, the Uruguayan Air force. However, the Uruguayan Air Force wrote it off as a total loss in 1941, only for it to resurface in 1971 when it was issued a certificate of airworthiness after 30 years.
- Syndicate-owned 1940 Tiger Moth II C/N 83595 DH82A G-AXBW (formerly RAF reg. T5879), flying out of private airstrips in England as of July 2025. It was involved in an accident in 2018 but fully restored. One co-owner was former Concorde pilot Captain John 'Stack' Butterley, who at the age of 82 died while flying in the Tiger Moth with another syndicate member in 2020.

== Specifications (DH 82A) ==
Data from The Tiger Moth Story, The de Havilland Tiger Moth

General characteristics

- Crew: 2
- Length: 23 ft 11 in (7.29 m)
- Wingspan: 29 ft 4 in (8.94 m)
- Height: 8 ft 9 in (2.67 m)
- Wing area: 239 sq ft (22.2 m^{2})
- Empty weight: 1,115 lb (506 kg)
- Gross weight: 1,825 lb (828 kg)
- Fuel capacity: 19 imp gal (23 US gal; 86 L)
- Powerplant: 1 × de Havilland Gipsy Major I 4-cylinder air-cooled inverted in-line piston engine, 130 hp (97 kW)
- Propellers: 2-bladed fixed-pitch propeller

Performance

- Maximum speed: 109 mph (175 km/h, 95 kn)
- Cruise speed: 67 mph (108 km/h, 58 kn)
- Range: 302 mi (486 km, 262 nmi)
- Service ceiling: 13,600 ft (4,100 m)
- Rate of climb: 673 ft/min (3.42 m/s)

Armament
up to 8× 20 lb (9.1 kg) bombs

== See also ==
External videos
- Period instructional video on flying the Tiger Moth
- In-cockpit footage of a preserved Tiger Moth conducting an instructional flight
- A Tiger Moth performing an aerobatic display routine
- Compilation of footage from the 2005 Annual International de Havilland Moth Club rally

Aircraft of comparable role, configuration, and era

- Boeing-Stearman Model 75
- Bücker Bü 131 Jungmann
- Fleet Finch
- Focke-Wulf Fw 44
- Gotha Go 145
- Levente II
- Polikarpov Po-2
- Stampe-Vertongen SV.4

Related lists

- List of aircraft of the Royal Air Force
- List of aircraft of the Royal Australian Air Force
- List of aircraft of the Royal New Zealand Air Force and Royal New Zealand Navy
- List of aircraft of the Spanish Republican Air Force
