= 12th Naval TBR Wing =

Royal Navy Fleet Air Arm aircraft wing

- White Ensign
- Active: 24 January – 28 December 1944
- Country: United Kingdom
- Branch: Royal Navy
- Type: Naval TBR Wing
- Role: Carrier-based Torpedo, bomber and reconnaissance
- Size: Two squadrons
- Part of: Fleet Air Arm
- Home station: RNAS Lee-on-Solent
- Engagements: World War II: Indian Ocean in World War II; Operation Boomerang; Operation Banquet; Operation Light; Operation Millet

Commanders
- Notable commanders: Lieutenant Commander E. M. Britton, RN

Aircraft flown
- Bomber: Fairey Barracuda Mk.II

12th Naval TBR Wing ("12 Wing") was an torpedo bomber reconnaissance Wing of the Fleet Air Arm of the Royal Navy during the Second World War. It was formed on 24 January 1944 with 815 and 817 Naval Air Squadrons, both equipped with the Fairey Barracuda torpedo and dive bomber. The wing was originally intended to operate from the fleet carrier HMS Indomitable, but with the carrier undergoing repair the two squadrons embarked in the escort carrier HMS Begum in February 1944 for passage to the Far East. The squadrons subsequently operated from shore bases in India and Ceylon before joining HMS Indomitable in July and undertaking operations with the Eastern Fleet in the Indian Ocean and East Indies. The wing was disbanded on 28 December 1944.

== History ==
=== Formation ===
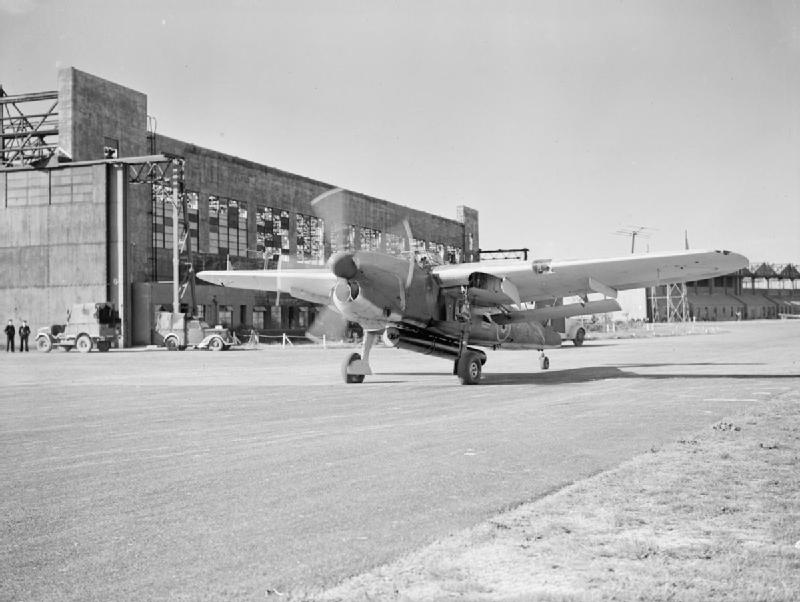
A Fairey Barracuda at RNAS Lee-on-Solent

From October 1943, Fleet Air Arm squadrons assigned to individual aircraft carriers were grouped into Naval Wings. During the Second World War, nineteen such wings were established, comprising both fighter and torpedo bomber-reconnaissance formations. This organisational structure was applied to embarked squadrons, although the number of squadrons allocated to each wing varied according to operational requirements and carrier complement.

The 12th Naval TBR Wing was formed on 24 January 1944 with 815 and 817 Naval Air Squadrons. Both squadrons were equipped with Fairey Barracuda Mk II, a British carrier-borne torpedo and dive bomber aircraft, with the Wing intended for service in the Far East aboard the Illustrious-class aircraft carrier HMS Indomitable.

The formation of the wing followed the re-assignment of the two squadrons originally intended for the 52nd Naval TBR Wing. 815 and 817 Squadrons had formed part of the 52nd Wing from 26 November 1943, but on 24 January 1944 both were assigned to newly create the 12th Naval TBR Wing. The Wing was commanded by Lieutenant Commander E.M. Britton, RN.

=== Passage to the Far East ===
With HMS Indomitable still under repair, the 12th Wing was initially allocated to the Ruler-class escort carrier HMS Begum for passage to the Far East. On 27 February 1944, twelve Fairey Barracuda aircraft from each of 815 and 817 Squadrons were embarked in HMS Begum. The aircraft were carried for transport to the Eastern Fleet, while the squadron personnel travelled separately aboard troopships.

HMS Begum sailed from the River Clyde on 3 March 1944 and proceeded via the Mediterranean, Suez Canal and Indian Ocean towards India. The carrier reached Madras, India, in April, where the Wing's Fairey Barracudas were unloaded. The two squadrons subsequently operated from shore bases while awaiting the completion of arrangements for their intended carrier deployment.

=== HMS Indomitable ===
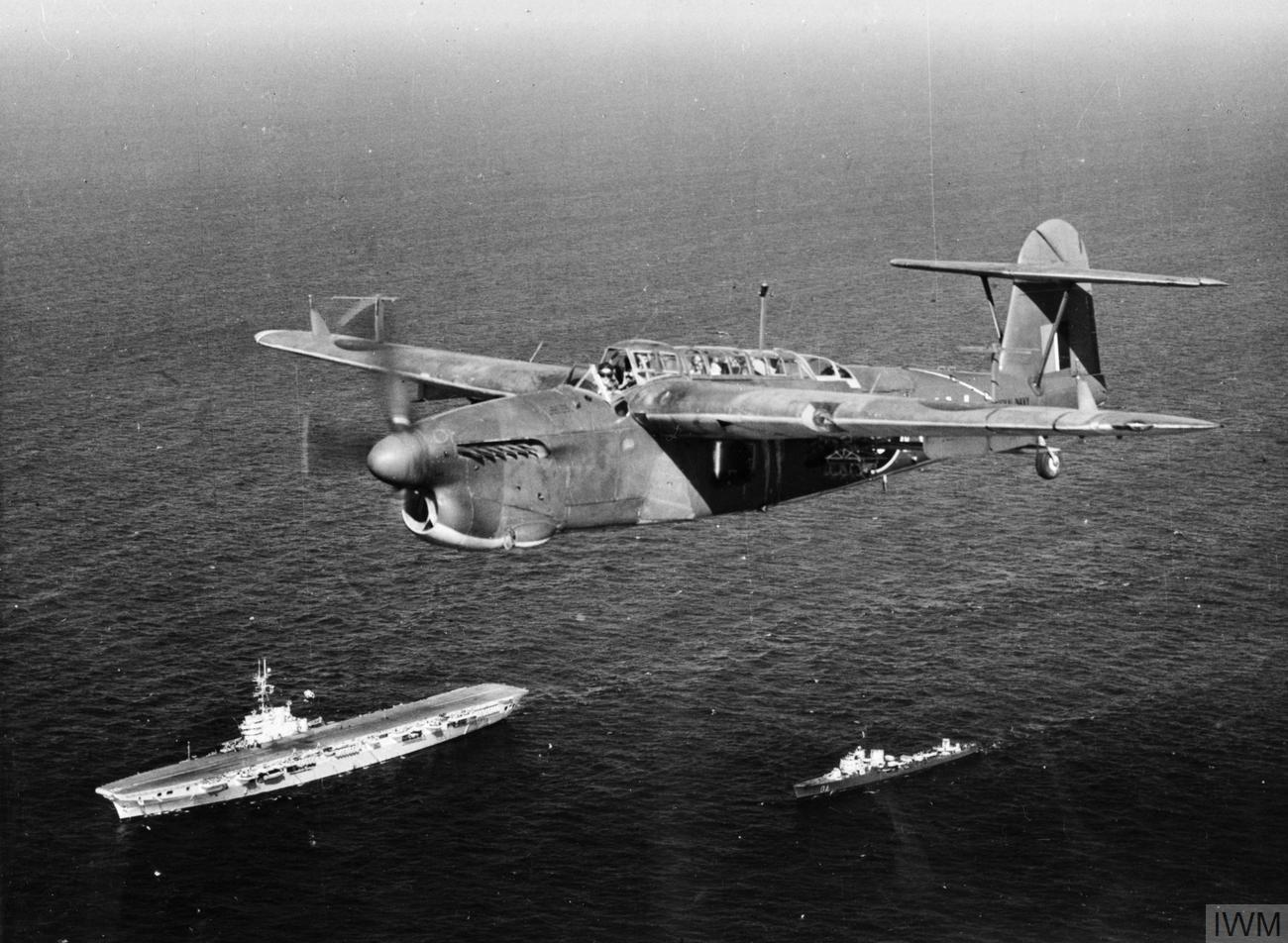
Fairey Barracuda Mk II; an example of the type used by the Wing

12 Wing embarked in HMS Indomitable on 23 July 1944, joining the carrier's air group for operational service with the Eastern Fleet.

In August, HMS Indomitable operated in the Indian Ocean. The aircraft carrier and it's wings participated in Operations Boomerang and Banquet, including attacks against Japanese targets on the west coast of Sumatra. During Operation Banquet on 24 August, Fairey Barracudas from HMS Indomitable attacked targets in the Padang area of Sumatra. The operation was part an offensive against Japanese installations in the East Indies.

In September, the Wing participated in Operation Light, involving attacks and reconnaissance against Japanese positions in northern Sumatra and the Nicobar Islands. Fairey Barracudas from HMS Indomitable attacked the Japanese facilities at Sigli on 18 September. The wing subsequently took part in Operation Millet in October 1944. The operation involved attacks against Japanese positions in the Nicobar Islands.

=== Disbandment ===
Following the October operations, the Fairey Barracuda squadrons disembarked from HMS Indomitable as the carrier's air group was reorganised for subsequent operations. However, the 12th Naval TBR Wing was disbanded on 28 December 1944.

== Squadrons ==
12th Naval TBR Wing consisted of two Fleet Air Arm fighter torpedo bomber reconnaissance squadrons during its existence:

- 815 Naval Air Squadron, (1944)
- 817 Naval Air Squadron, (1944)

== Naval air stations and carrier deployments ==
The 12th Naval TBR Wing's movements during 1944 followed the planned deployment of 815 and 817 Naval Air Squadrons from the United Kingdom to the Eastern Fleet. The two squadrons initially worked up in the United Kingdom before being transported to India, subsequently operating from Indian and Ceylonese shore bases before embarking in HMS Indomitable for operations in the Indian Ocean and East Indies.

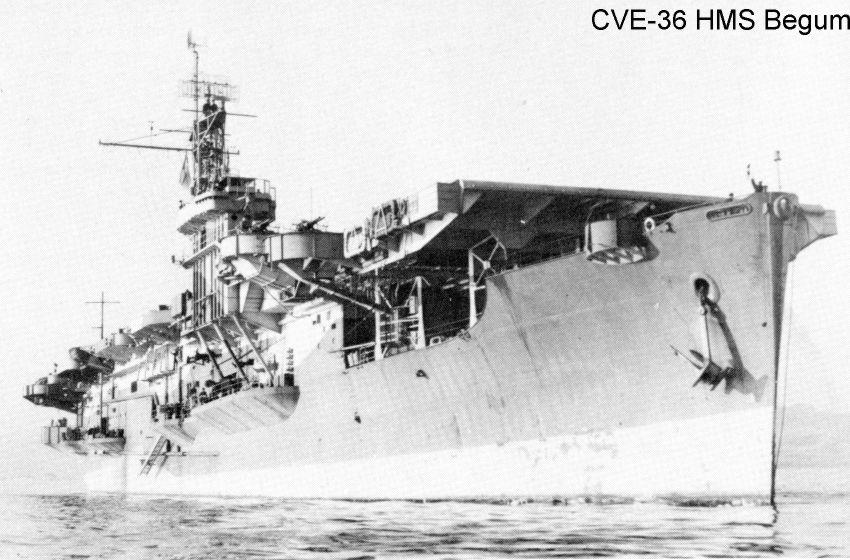
HMS Begum

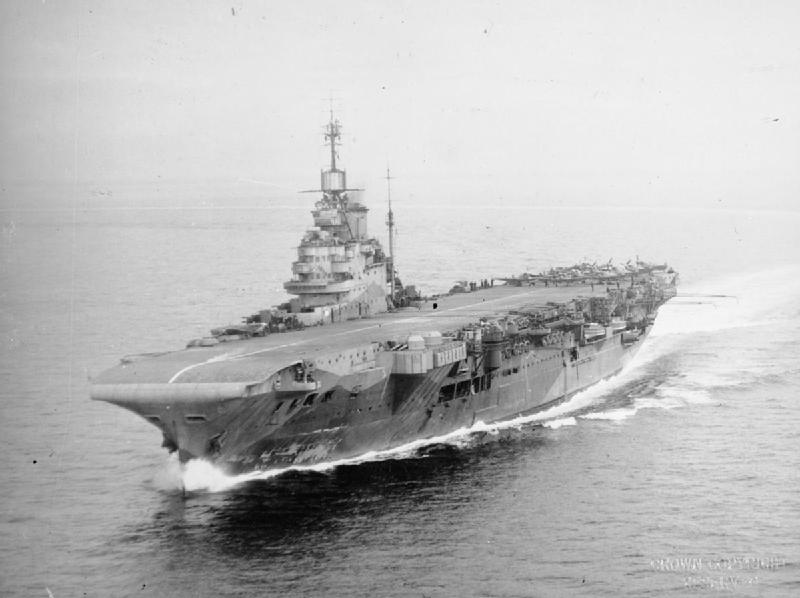
HMS Indomitable

- Royal Naval Air Station Lee-on-Solent (HMS Daedalus), Hampshire.
  - 817 Naval Air Squadron re-formed at RNAS Lee-on-Solent on 1 December 1943 and remained there until 14 January 1944, when it moved to RNAS Machrihanish, Argyll and Bute.
  - 815 Naval Air Squadron followed a similar training and preparation programme as part of the Fairey Barracuda force being assembled for the Eastern Fleet.
- Royal Naval Air Station Machrihanish (HMS Landrail), Argyll and Bute.
  - 817 Squadron was based at RNAS Machrihanish from 14 January to 8 February 1944, continuing its work-up before moving to RAF Tain. The squadron subsequently joined the 12th Wing for its overseas deployment.
- Royal Air Force Tain, Highland, Scotland.
  - 817 Squadron operated from RAF Tain from 8 to 26 February 1944 before moving for embarkation in HMS Begum.
- HMS Begum
  - On 27 February 1944, twelve Fairey Barracuda Mk II aircraft from each of 815 and 817 Squadrons were embarked in HMS Begum for passage to the Eastern Fleet. The aircraft were carried on the flight deck, while squadron personnel travelled separately aboard SS Strathnaver and SS Aronda. HMS Begum sailed from the River Clyde on 3 March as part of Convoy KMF.29A and proceeded via the Mediterranean, Suez Canal and Indian Ocean towards India.
- Royal Air Force Ulunderpet, India
  - From 14 April both squadrons operated from RAF Ulunderpet while preparing for their eventual carrier deployment. 817 Squadron remained at RAF Ulunderpet until 1 June.
- RN Air Section China Bay, Ceylon.
  - 817 Squadron moved from RAF Ulunderpet to RN Air Section China Bay on 1 June 1944, beginning the final stage of its preparation for operations with the Eastern Fleet. It remained there until 15 June.
- Royal Naval Air Station Katukurunda (HMS Ukussa), Ceylon.
  - 817 Squadron moved to RNAS Katukurunda on 14 June and remained there until embarking in HMS Indomitable on 23 July. The air station provided a shore base for the squadron's training and preparation for carrier operations.
- HMS Indomitable
  - The 12th Wing embarked in HMS Indomitable on 23 July 1944. The carrier subsequently operated with the Eastern Fleet and the Wing took part in Operations Boomerang and Banquet in August, Operation Light in September and Operation Millet in October.
- Royal Naval Air Station Katukurunda (HMS Ukussa), Ceylon
  - Following the first period aboard HMS Indomitable, 817 Squadron was disembarked to RNAS Katukurunda on 27 September 1944. It remained there until returning to HMS Indomitable on 8 October for the carrier's October operations.
- HMS Indomitable
  - 817 Squadron re-embarked on 8 October and remained with HMS Indomitable until 20 October. During this period the Wing participated in Operation Millet, the October attacks against Japanese positions in the Nicobar Islands.
- Royal Naval Air Station Trincomalee (HMS Bambara), Ceylon
  - Following the conclusion of the October carrier operations, 817 Squadron was disembarked at RNAS Trincomalee on 20 October. It remained there until 7 November as the squadron's operational employment with the 12th Wing came to an end.
- Royal Naval Air Station Coimbatore (HMS Garuda), India.
  - 815 Squadron was disembarked at RNAS Coimbatore on 28 October. It remained there until 4 November.

== Aircraft ==
The wing's two constituent squadrons operated with one type of torpedo bomber aircraft: Fairey Barracuda Mk II torpedo and dive bomber (1944).

== Wing Leader ==
The wing's recorded commanding officer chronology was: Lieutenant Commander E.M. Britton, RN, from 24 January to 28 December 1944.

== See also ==
- Fleet Air Arm
- List of aircraft wings of the Royal Navy
- 815 Naval Air Squadron
- 817 Naval Air Squadron
- HMS Begum
- HMS Indomitable
- Eastern Fleet

== Bibliography ==
- Ballance, Theo; Howard, Lee; Sturtivant, Ray (2016). The Squadrons and Units of the Fleet Air Arm. Air Britain Historians Limited. ISBN 978-0-85130-489-2.
- Wragg, David (2019). The Fleet Air Arm Handbook 1939–1945. The History Press. ISBN 978-0-7509-9303-6.
