= HMS Cattistock =

Three ships of the Royal Navy have been named HMS Cattistock after the Cattistock hunt:

- HMS Cattistock (1917), launched in 1917, was a Hunt-class minesweeper that served in World War I
- HMS Cattistock (L35), launched in 1940, was a Type I Hunt-class destroyer that served in World War II
- HMS Cattistock (M31), launched in 1981, is a Hunt-class mine countermeasures vessel

== Battle honours ==
- North Sea, 1941–45
- Atlantic, 1942–1944
- Normandy, 1944
- Kuwait, 1991
