= Steve Moorhouse =

Royal Navy Vice Admiral (born 1973)

Vice Admiral Steve Moorhouse CBE
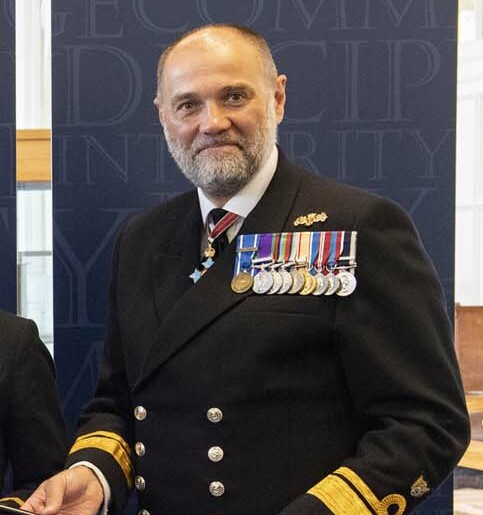
- Moorhouse in 2023
- Born: 5 February 1973 (age 53)
- Military career
- Allegiance: United Kingdom
- Branch: Royal Navy
- Service years: 1991–present
- Rank: Vice Admiral
- Commands: Combined Task Force 150; UK Carrier Strike Group; HMS Queen Elizabeth; HMS Prince of Wales; HMS Ocean; HMS Lancaster; HMS Clyde; HMS Severn
- Conflicts: Sierra Leone Civil War; War in Afghanistan; Iraq War
- Awards: Commander of the Order of the British Empire

Vice Admiral Stephen Mark Richard Moorhouse, CBE (born 5 February 1973) is a Royal Navy officer who currently serves as Fleet Commander having taken the role on 5 September 2025.

== Naval career ==
Having attended King Edward VI School, Stratford-upon-Avon, Moorhouse joined the Royal Navy on 18 September 1991. After qualifying as an airborne early warning specialist, he became successively commanding officer of the offshore patrol vessel, HMS Severn, the offshore patrol vessel, HMS Clyde, and the frigate, HMS Lancaster. He went on to command the landing platform helicopter, HMS Ocean and then, from September 2018, the aircraft carrier, HMS Prince of Wales. In May 2019, he was appointed the Commanding Officer of the Prince of Wales' sister ship HMS Queen Elizabeth on short notice after the reassignment of her former captain.

Moorhouse became Commander United Kingdom Carrier Strike Group in December 2019, which role included leading the United Kingdom Carrier Strike Group 21 deployment to the Far East and a tour as commander of Combined Task Force 150; he then became Director of Force Generation in January 2022 and Assistant Chief of the Defence Staff (Operations & Commitments) in 2024.

Moorhouse was appointed an Officer of the Order of the British Empire (OBE) in the 2015 New Year Honours, and advanced to Commander of the same order (CBE) in Operational Honours on 25 November 2022.

Moorhouse became Fleet Commander on 5 September 2025.

Military offices
| Preceded by Nick Cooke-Priest | Captain of HMS Queen Elizabeth; 2019–2020 | Succeeded by Angus Essenhigh |
| Preceded by Mike Utley | Commander United Kingdom Carrier Strike Group; 2019–2022 | Succeeded by Angus Essenhigh |
| Preceded by Allan Marshall | Assistant Chief of the Defence Staff (Operations & Commitments); 2024–2025 | Succeeded by Daniel Reeve |
| Preceded by Andrew Burns | Fleet Commander; 2025–present | Incumbent |
