= Cattistock =

Village in Dorset, England

Coordinates: 50.7947°N 2.5811°W

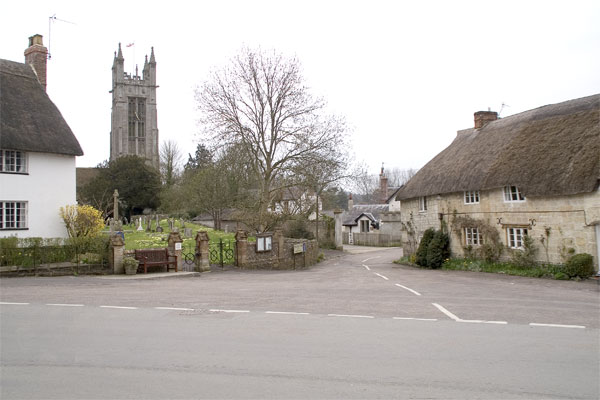
- Church and The Square, Cattistock

- Location within Dorset
- Population: 509
- OS grid reference: SY592996
- Unitary authority: Dorset
- Ceremonial county: Dorset
- Region: South West
- Country: England
- Sovereign state: United Kingdom
- Post town: Dorchester
- Postcode district: DT2
- Dialling code: 01300
- Police: Dorset
- Fire: Dorset and Wiltshire
- Ambulance: South Western
- UK Parliament: West Dorset

Cattistock is a village and civil parish in west Dorset, England, sited in the upper reaches of the Frome Valley, 8 miles (13 km) northwest of the county town Dorchester. The Dorset poet William Barnes called it "elbow-streeted Cattstock", a comment on the less-than-linear village street. In the 2011 census the parish had a population of 509.

== Parish church ==
A church was built here in the 12th century by the monks of Milton Abbey, though this structure has not survived. The current church, dedicated to St Peter and St Paul, was rebuilt in the 19th century by architects Sir George Gilbert Scott and his son George Gilbert Scott Junior. The Perpendicular-styled tower was the work of the latter, and has led to the church being dubbed the 'Cathedral of the Frome Valley'; he was also responsible for the porch, north aisle and vestry. A carillon of 35 bells was installed in the new tower a few years after its construction. This was the first carillon to be introduced to England and attracted hundreds of visitors to the valley, though the bells were destroyed by a fire in the tower on 15 September 1940. The fire also destroyed the very large clock, which previously almost spanned the width of the tower. In 1972 the Pevsner guide to Dorset architecture said that "for the mid- to late-nineteenth century, this is the masterpiece amongst Dorset churches". The church is a Grade I Listed Building.

== Chantmarle ==
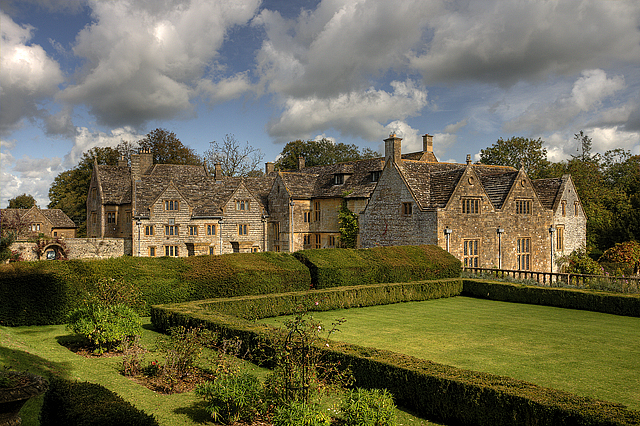
Chantmarle

Nearly 1.75 miles (2.82 km) north of the village is Chantmarle, a house dating from the 15th century, with additions in the 16th, 17th and 19th centuries. It received its name – which means "song of the blackbird" in Norman French – from the Chauntmerles family, who lived on the site in the early 13th century. In 1910 Inigo Thomas designed new end wings and a terraced garden with ponds. In the late 20th century Chantmarle was used as a centre for police training. It then became a Christian retreat and wedding reception venue, but is now once more a private home.

== Cattistock Hunt ==
The Cattistock Hunt is a foxhound pack established by a parson at Cattistock Lodge in the mid 18th century. It was given the name 'The True Blue'.

The Hunt has been affiliated with all UK naval vessels named HMS Cattistock, including the latest to bear the name, HMS Cattistock.

The village also has a close relationship with those named ships too and has hosted the ships' crews on many occasions.

An ensign and emblem shield of HMS Cattistock – a blue cornflower, the symbol of the Hunt's colours and a wildflower local to the area – is displayed in the village church.

== Food festival ==
Cattistock hosts a Dorset knob throwing event and the Frome Valley Food Festival every year on the first Sunday in May.
