= George Zambellas =

Royal Navy Admiral (born 1958)

Admiral Sir George Zambellas GCB DSC ADC DL FRAeS
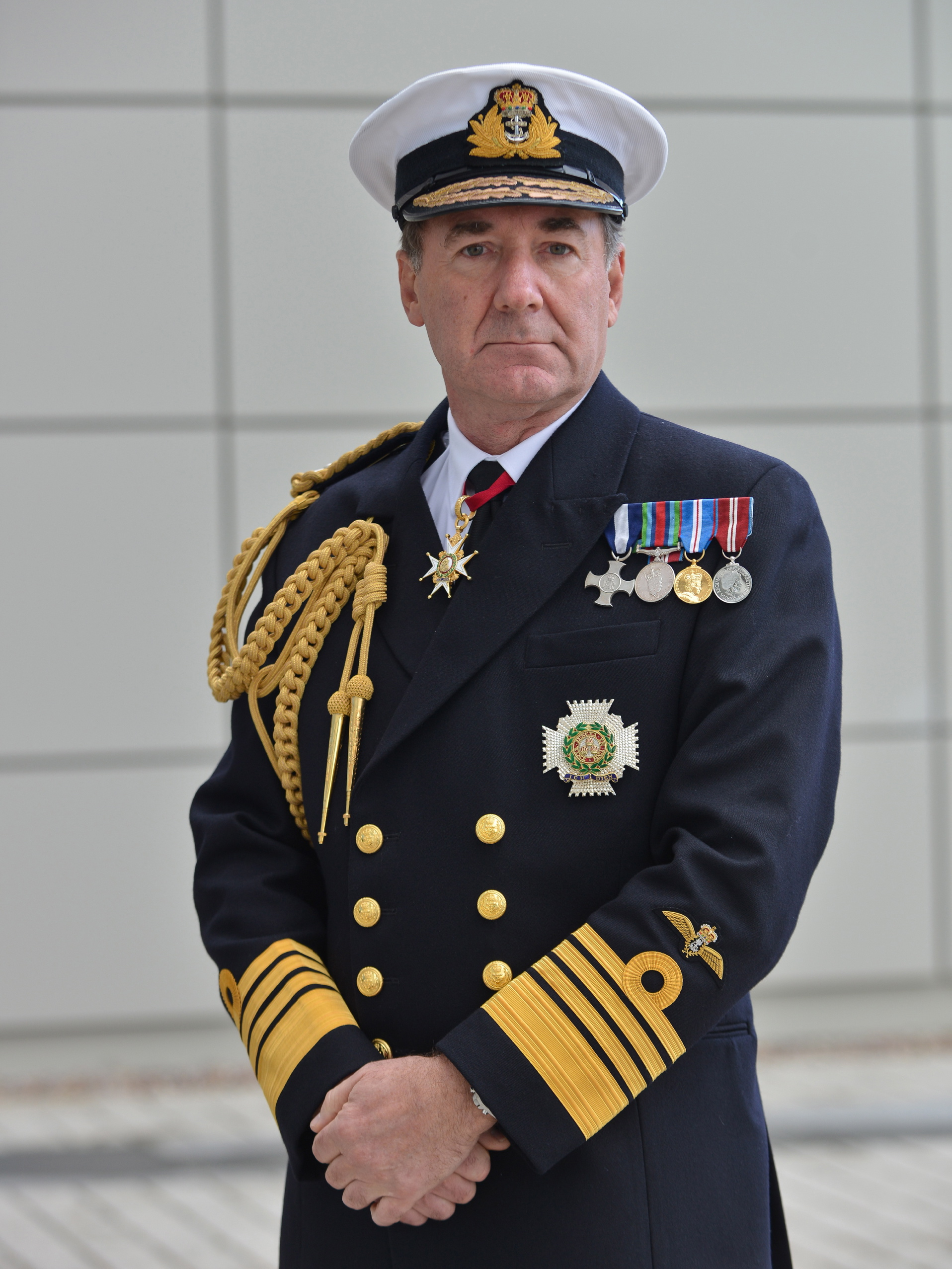
- Zambellas in 2013
- Born: 4 April 1958 (age 68); Swansea, Wales
- Allegiance: United Kingdom
- Branch: Royal Navy
- Service years: 1980–2016
- Rank: Admiral
- Service number: C029289H
- Commands: First Sea Lord; Fleet Commander; Commander UK Maritime Forces; HMS Chatham; HMS Argyll; HMS Cattistock
- Conflicts: Operation Palliser
- Awards: Knight Grand Cross of the Order of the Bath; Distinguished Service Cross
- Education: University of Southampton
- Other work: Lord Warden of the Cinque Ports; Deputy Lieutenant for Dorset; Warden of the Shipwrights' Company

Admiral Sir George Michael Zambellas, GCB, DSC, ADC, DL, FRAeS (born 4 April 1958) is a British retired Royal Navy officer. He served as First Sea Lord and Chief of the Naval Staff from April 2013 before handing over duties to Admiral Sir Philip Jones in April 2016.

In his early career Zambellas served as a helicopter pilot with 814 Naval Air Squadron, 829 Naval Air Squadron and then 815 Naval Air Squadron. As Captain of HMS Chatham he was deployed as part of Operation Palliser off Sierra Leone, for which he received the Distinguished Service Cross in 2001. He went on to be Fleet Commander and Deputy Chief of the Naval Staff in early 2012. In June 2024, he was appointed to the ancient honorary office of Lord Warden of the Cinque Ports.

== Early life and education ==
Born at Swansea, Wales, the son of a Greek father, Michael George Zambellas and Rosemary Frederique née Lindsay, Zambellas was educated at Shabani Primary School and Peterhouse School in Southern Rhodesia (now Zimbabwe), then at Stowe School. He read Aeronautical and Astronautical Engineering at the University of Southampton, graduating in 1980 with a Bachelor of Science (BSc) degree.

== Career ==
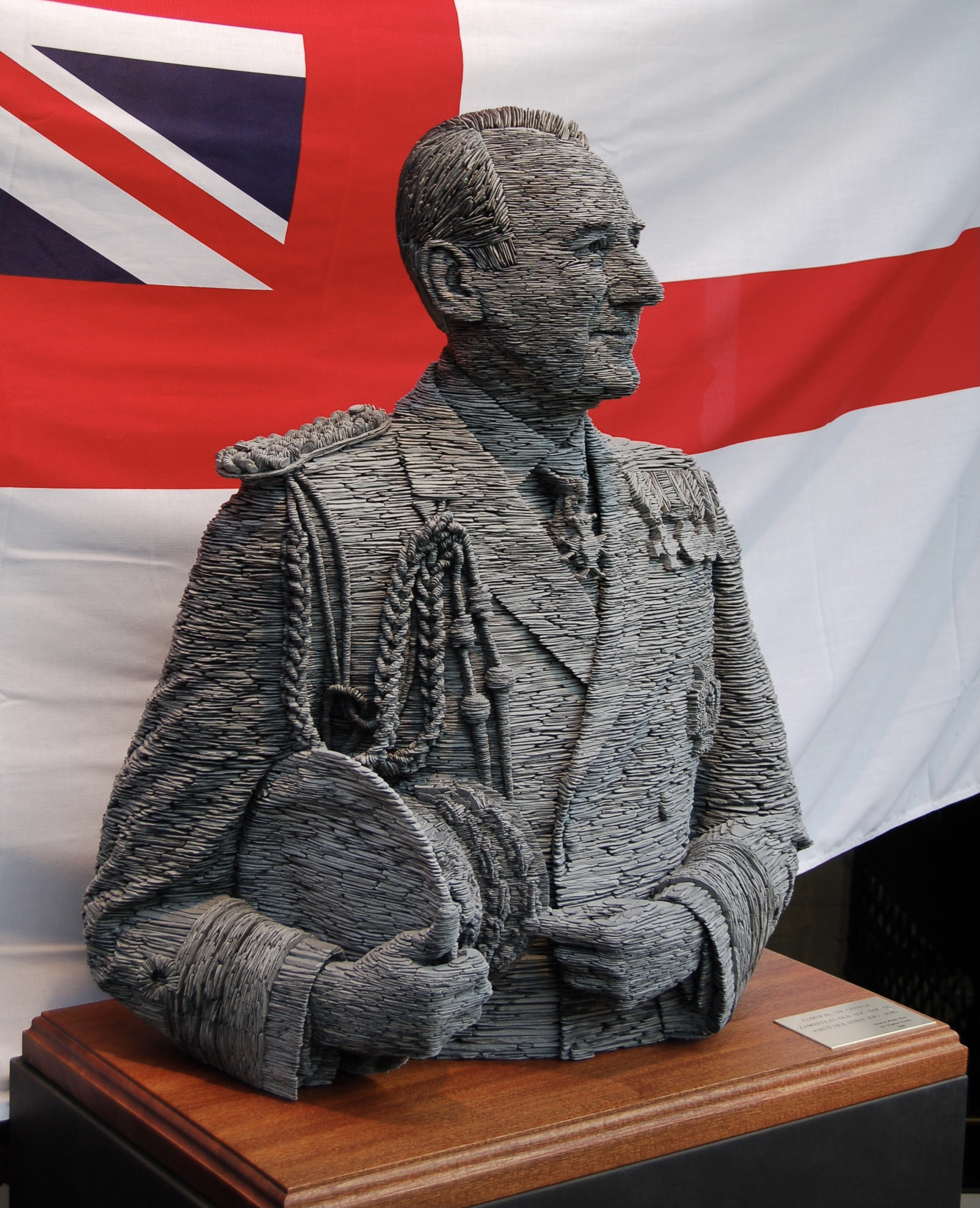
Sculpture of Admiral Zambellas by Stephen Kettle

Zambellas was commissioned as an acting sub-lieutenant in the Royal Navy on 17 September 1980. He was promoted to lieutenant on 16 May 1982 and served with 814 Naval Air Squadron, 829 Naval Air Squadron and 815 Naval Air Squadron in his early career.

Zambellas was trained for the Naval Staff at Greenwich in 1990, and after spending a short time as a corporate planner for the Royal Navy's manpower and training division within the Ministry of Defence, he took command of the mine-sweeper HMS Cattistock in 1991. His next appointment was ashore, as an aviation operations officer in the Fleet Headquarters at Northwood, before being promoted to commander on 30 June 1994. In 1995 he was given command of the frigate HMS Argyll and was deployed on counter-narcotics operations in the Caribbean.

Zambellas served as a corporate planner during the 1997–98 Strategic Defence Review before returning to operational command in 1999 as captain of the frigate HMS Chatham and being deployed as part of Operation Palliser off Sierra Leone for which he received the Distinguished Service Cross in 2001. In 2001 he took the Higher Command and Staff Course at Shrivenham before becoming Deputy Flag Officer Sea Training, responsible for training Royal Navy and foreign warships and auxiliaries.

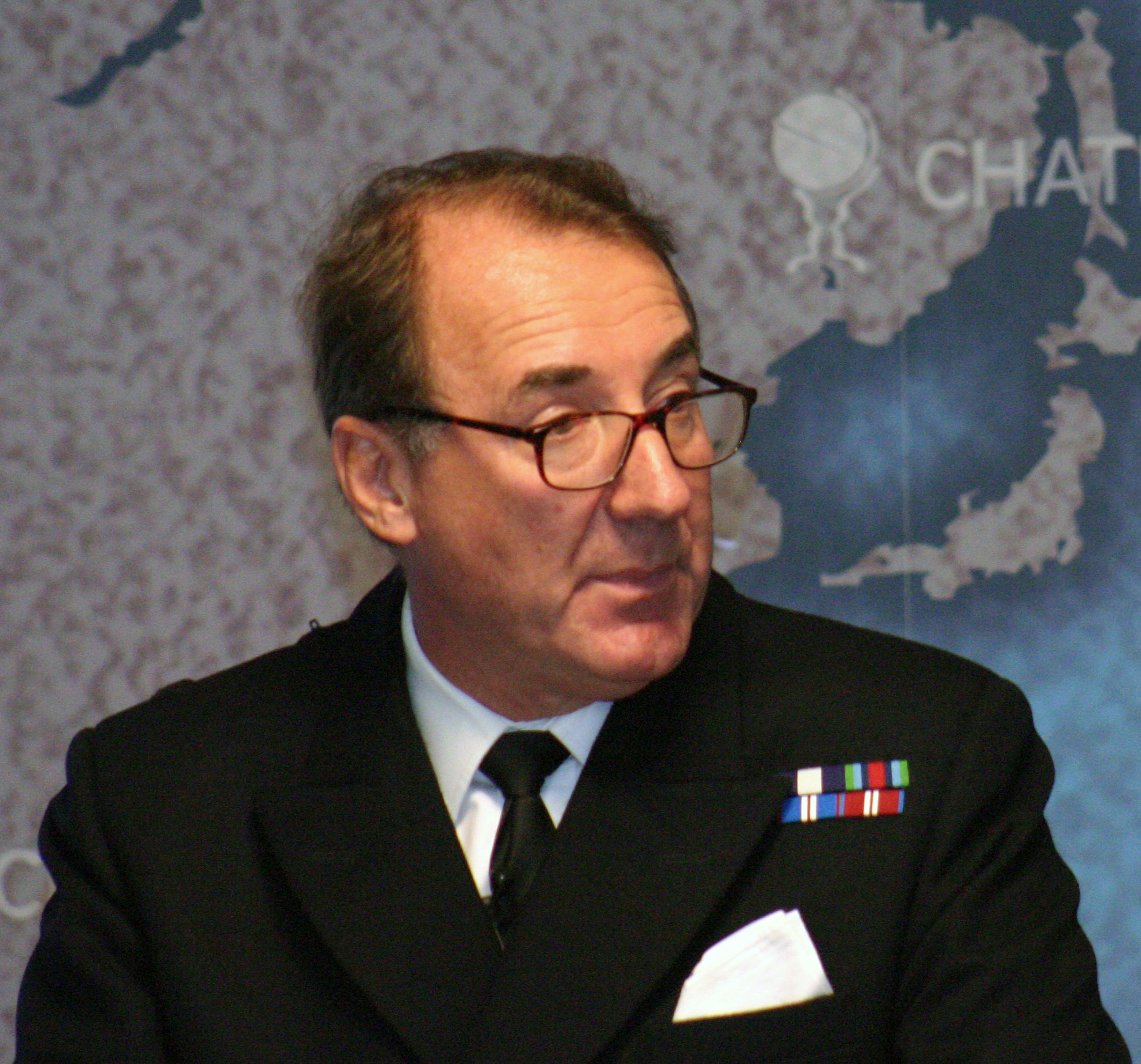
Zambellas speaking at Chatham House in 2012

Promoted to commodore in 2002, Zambellas was appointed to be principal staff officer to the Chief of the Defence staff and served Admiral Sir Michael Boyce and General Sir Michael Walker during the invasion of Iraq and the early days of its fallout. He was given command of the Royal Navy's Amphibious Task Group in January 2005.

Promoted as rear admiral on 29 August 2006 and appointed Chief of Staff (Transformation), Zambellas was in this role entrusted with "designing and delivering the Fleet's new approach to the generation of maritime capability and support to operations." In 2007, he became Commander of United Kingdom Maritime Force, then in October 2008, Chief of Staff (Operations) at UK Permanent Joint Headquarters at Northwood.

Promoted vice admiral on 18 January 2011, Zambellas was appointed Deputy Commander-in-Chief Fleet, Chief of Staff to Navy Command Headquarters, and Chief Naval Warfare Officer. He became Commander-in-Chief Fleet in January 2012 and was promoted admiral on 6 January 2012. He was also double-hatted as Commander, Allied Maritime Command in January 2012. In April 2012 his role was re-designated Fleet Commander and Deputy Chief of the Naval Service.

Zambellas was appointed Knight Commander of the Order of the Bath (KCB) in the 2012 Birthday Honours and became First Sea Lord and Chief of the Naval Staff on 9 April 2013. As of 2015, Zambellas was paid a salary of between £180,000 and £184,999 by the department, making him one of the 328 most highly paid people in the British public sector at that time.

On 15 April 2014, in an op-ed article for the Daily Telegraph Zambellas laid out the case for a "No" vote at the 2014 Scottish independence referendum, stating that it would weaken British maritime defence. Despite this, on 12 November 2014 he was publicly chastised by the UK Defence Secretary for suggesting to a journalist that the contract for Type 26 frigates may not be awarded to Scottish shipyards.

On 4 July 2014, Zambellas was among those attending the launch ceremony of the 70,600-tonne Royal Navy aircraft carrier HMS Queen Elizabeth, the largest warship ever built in the United Kingdom, and formally named by Queen Elizabeth II.

Appointed President of the Shipwrecked Mariners Society in 2017, Zambellas serves as Renter Warden of the Worshipful Company of Shipwrights (for 2024/25).

== Honours and awards ==
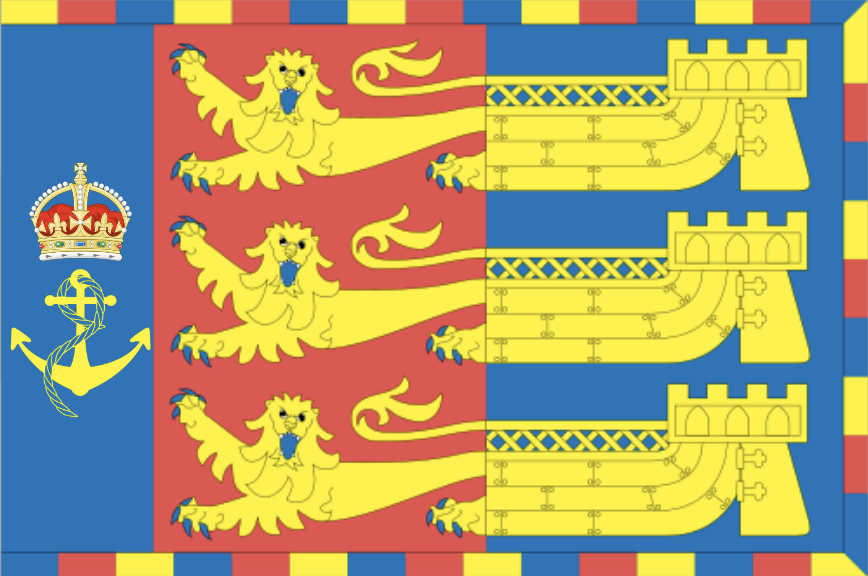
Admiral Zambellas' banner as Lord Warden of the Cinque Ports

Zambellas was appointed Knight Grand Cross of the Order of the Bath (GCB) in the 2016 New Year Honours being invested at Windsor Castle with Air Chief Marshal Sir Andrew Pulford on 13 April 2016.

An Elder Brother of Trinity House since 2016, Zambellas was admitted to the Freedom of the Shipwrights' Company in 2014 (becoming Renter Warden for 2024/25), and is an Honorary Freeman of the Worshipful Company of Merchant Taylors.

Elected a Fellow of the Royal Aeronautical Society (FRAeS) in 2009, and appointed a deputy lieutenant (DL) for Dorset in September 2013, Zambellas serves as an Extra Equerry to King Charles III since 17 March 2023. He succeeded Lord Boyce, on 20 June 2024, as Lord Warden of the Cinque Ports and Constable of Dover Castle.

Ribbon	Description	Notes
	Order of the Bath	Appointed Knight Commander (KCB) in 2012; Appointed Knight Grand Cross (GCB) in 2015
	Distinguished Service Cross	6 April 2001 (DSC)
	Operational Service Medal for Sierra Leone	
	Queen Elizabeth II Golden Jubilee Medal	6 February 2002
	Queen Elizabeth II Diamond Jubilee Medal	6 February 2012
	Queen Elizabeth II Platinum Jubilee Medal	6 February 2022
	King Charles III Coronation Medal	6 May 2023
	Naval Long Service and Good Conduct Medal (1848)	With 2 Bars

== Personal life ==
In 1982 Zambellas married Amanda Jane LeCudennec; they have three sons.

Military offices
Preceded by Neil Morisetti	Commander United Kingdom Maritime Forces; 2007–2008	Succeeded by Sir Philip Jones
Preceded by Sir Richard Ibbotson	Deputy Commander-in-Chief Fleet; 2011	Succeeded by Sir Philip Jones
Preceded by Sir Trevor Soar	Commander-in-Chief Fleet; January – April 2012	Re-designated as Fleet Commander
New title	Fleet Commander and Deputy Chief of the Naval Staff; April – November 2012	Succeeded by Sir Philip Jones
Preceded by Sir Mark Stanhope	First Sea Lord; 2013–2016	Succeeded by Sir Philip Jones
Honorary titles
Preceded by Sir Trevor Soar	Vice-Admiral of the United Kingdom; 2012	Succeeded by Sir Donald Gosling
Preceded by The Lord Boyce	Lord Warden of the Cinque Ports; 2024–present	Incumbent
