= 815 Naval Air Squadron =

Flying squadron of the Royal Navy's Fleet Air Arm

- Squadron badge
- Active: 1939–1943; 1943–1944; 1944–1945; 1947–1958; 1958–1959; 1959–1960; 1961–1966; 1981 – present
- Country: United Kingdom
- Branch: Royal Navy
- Type: Torpedo Bomber Reconnaissance squadron
- Role: Carrier-based: anti-submarine warfare (ASW); anti-surface warfare (ASuW)
- Size: Approx. 240 personnel
- Part of: Fleet Air Arm
- Home station: RNAS Yeovilton
- Motto: Strike Deep
- Aircraft: AgustaWestland Wildcat HMA2
- Engagements: World War II; Falklands War; Gulf War; 2026 Iran war
- Website: Official Twitter

Commanders
- Current commander: Commander James Woods

Insignia
- Identification symbol: Barry wavy of six white and blue, a harpoon point downward winged gold (1949)

815 Naval Air Squadron is a Fleet Air Arm (FAA) naval air squadron of the United Kingdom's Royal Navy (RN). It currently operates the AgustaWestland Wildcat HMA.2 maritime attack helicopter and is the Royal Navy's front line Wildcat Naval Air Squadron. The squadron is based at RNAS Yeovilton (HMS Heron) in Somerset and provides helicopters for the frigates and destroyers of the Royal Navy.

The squadron is capable of carrying out multiple roles such as: counter-narcotics, anti-piracy, Above Surface Warfare (ASuW), search and rescue, disaster relief and flying and engineering training. In the early 2000s, the Navy said that the squadron was largest helicopter squadron in Europe.

== History ==
=== Second World War (1939-1945) ===
==== Swordfish ====
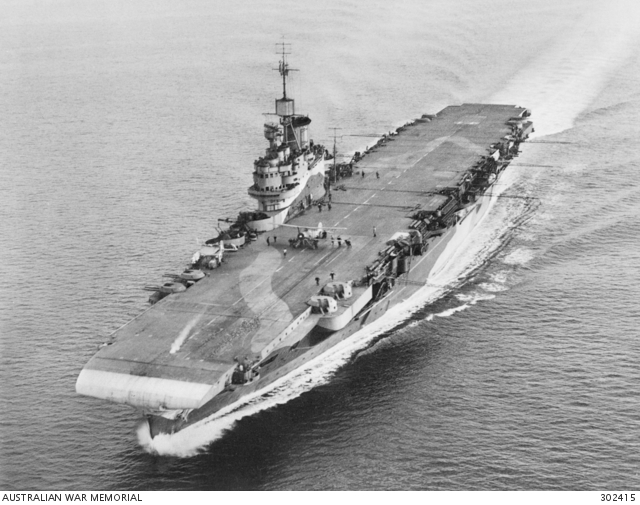
HMS Illustrious, sometime in 1942

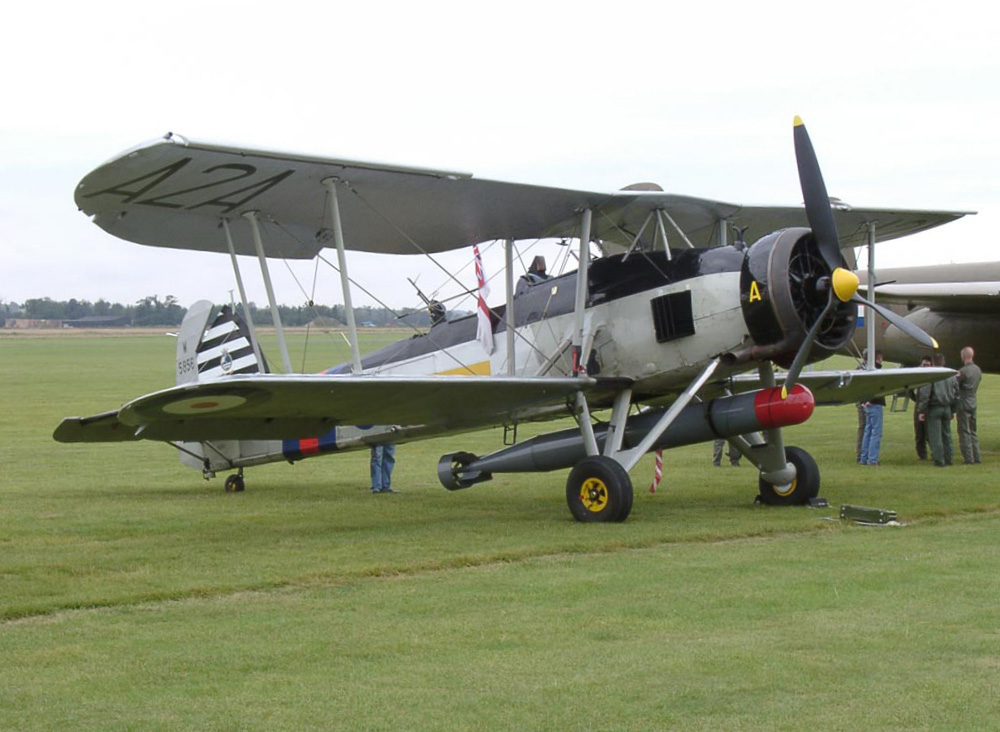
A still flying example of a Fairey Swordfish

The squadron formed at RNAS Worthy Down on 9 October 1939, from the remnants of 811 and 822 squadrons that had survived the sinking of their carrier HMS Courageous in September 1939, with Fairey Swordfish aircraft. The squadron disbanded in November 1939 and merged into 774 Naval Air Squadron but reformed the same month.

In May 1940 the squadron provided support to the Dunkirk evacuation. In June 1940, the squadron embarked on HMS Illustrious and sailed for the Mediterranean in August, attacking and minelaying Benghazi, Rhodes and Tobruk. The squadron gained early fame with its involvement in the Battle of Taranto in 1940, when the Italian Battlefleet in harbour at Taranto was raided; which redefined the use of air power from the sea. The aircraft of the commanding officer was lost, against the crippling of half the Italian fleet. In March 1941, the squadron fought in the Battle of Cape Matapan. The squadron re-equipped in August 1941, with a mixture of Swordfish and Fairey Albacore aircraft, operating from shore bases in support of the North African campaign. In July 1943, 815 Squadron was assigned to No. 201 (Naval Co-operation) Group with a detachment of Swordfish assigned to AHQ Malta; the units participating in Operation Husky on 10 July 1943, before 815 Squadron was disbanded.

==== Barracuda ====
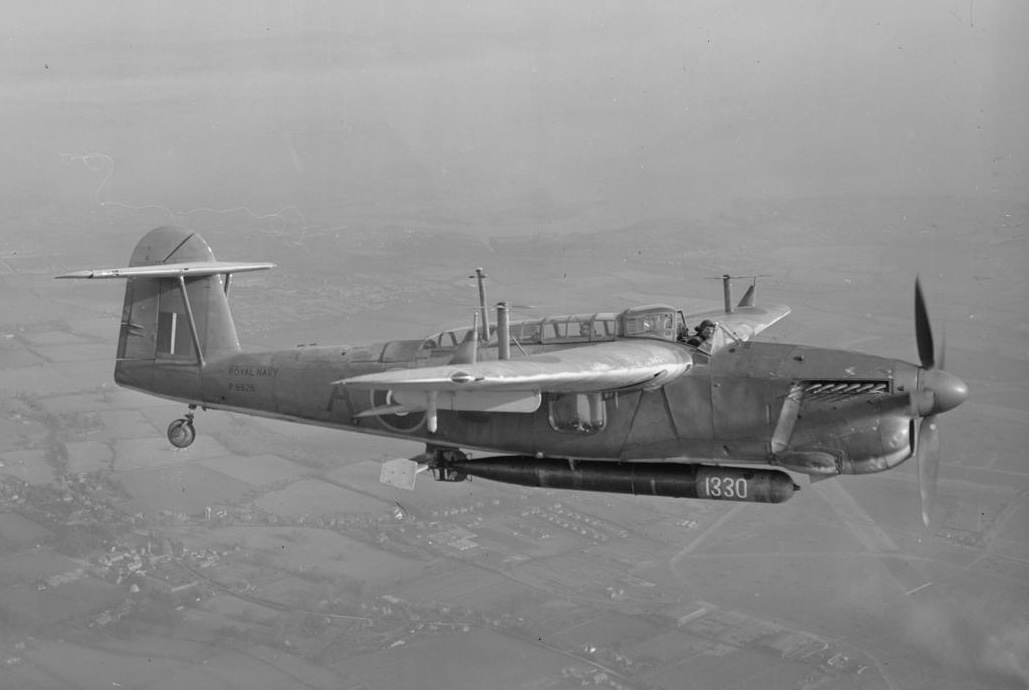
A Fairey Barracuda

The squadron reformed on 1 October 1943 at RNAS Lee-on-Solent (HMS Daedalus), Hampshire, to operate Fairey Barracuda torpedo bombers. In January 1944, it became part of the 12th Naval TBR Wing. On 27 February, the squadron's Barracuda Mk II aircraft were embarked in the Ruler-class escort carrier, HMS Begum, while the squadron personnel were placed on the troopships SS Strathnaver and SS Aronda. HMS Begum departed from the Clyde on 3 March as part of Convoy KMF.29A, heading towards Alexandria. Via Ceylon, the ships eventually reached Madras harbour on the 11, and unloading commenced on the 14, with 815 Squadron scheduled to be accommodated at RAF St. Thomas Mount.

It operated from the Illustrious-class aircraft carrier HMS Indomitable with the Eastern Fleet, It was part of the force which provided air-sea rescue and fighter cover for Operation Boomerang on 23 August, which was initiated to ensure air-sea rescue support during the air assaults conducted by XX Bomber Command on Sumatra prior to launching Operation Banquet on 24 August, which involved air strikes targeting Padang, Sumatra; Operation Light, a two-part initiative, aimed to execute air strikes against Japanese positions in Sigli, Northern Sumatra, Indonesia, along with conducting aerial reconnaissance over the Nicobar Islands on 17 and 18 September; Operation Millet, which entailed a naval bombardment and aerial attacks on Japanese positions in the Nicobar Islands from 17 to 20 October 1944, was strategically designed to serve as a diversion coinciding with the American invasion of Leyte in the Philippines.

In November 1944 the squadron disbanded and reformed in December at RNAS Machrihanish (HMS Landrail), flying Barracudas for anti-submarine operations, the following month being spent doing DLT (deck landing training) on HMS Campania. The squadron was transferred to the Far East aboard HMS Smiter but saw no action before VJ-Day and returned to the UK in September 1945 aboard HMS Fencer. The squadron disbanded at RNAS Rattray (HMS Merganser), Aberdeenshire, in January 1946.

=== Naval anti-submarine squadron ===
The squadron was re-established on 1 December 1947 at RNAS Eglinton (HMS Gannet), County Londonderry, designated as an anti-submarine squadron through the renumbering of 744 Naval Air Squadron. It was equipped with twelve Fairey Barracuda Mk III aircraft and functioned as the Naval Anti-Submarine Squadron in collaboration with the Joint Anti-Submarine School located in Londonderry. Although primarily based on land, the squadron occasionally deployed on carriers for training exercises. By December 1951, the number of aircraft was reduced to ten.

=== Avenger (1953-1955) ===
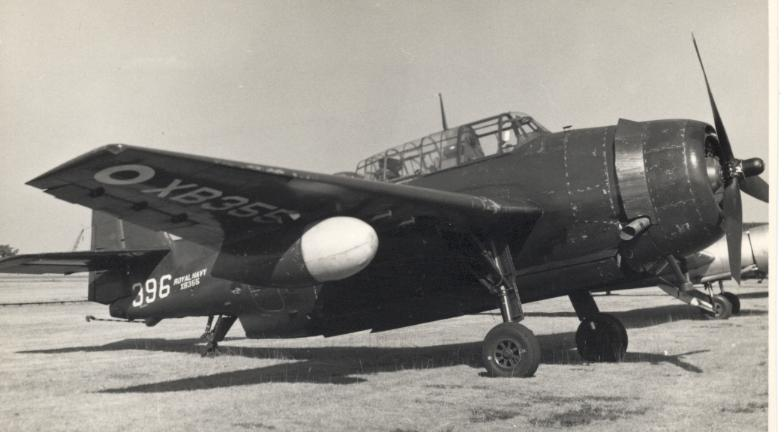
A Grumman Avenger AS.5, albeit one of 744 Naval Air Squadron

In May 1953, the squadron was re-equipped with eight Grumman Avenger TBM-3Es, which were subsequently replaced by AS.4 and later AS.5 variants. In January 1954, it embarked in the Audacious-class aircraft carrier HMS Eagle for operations in the Mediterranean. Later that year it spent some time aboard the lead ship of her class, HMS Illustrious, in home waters. A further deployment occurred in the Mediterranean starting in July 1955, this time aboard the Centaur class light fleet carrier HMS Albion; however, in October, the squadron was disbanded upon disembarking.

=== Gannet (1956-1958) ===
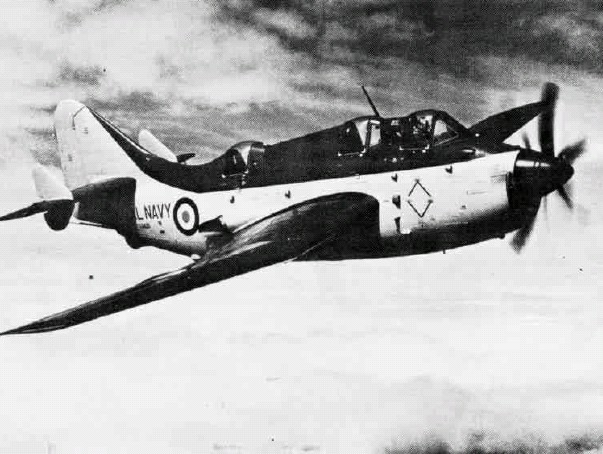
A Fairey Gannet AS.4

In February 1956, 815 Squadron was reformed at RNAS Eglinton as an anti-submarine unit, equipped with eight Fairey Gannet AS.1 aircraft and a Gannet T.2 for shore training. The squadron embarked in the Audacious-class aircraft carrier HMS Ark Royal in January 1957, undertaking a three-week visit to the United States in May, which included cross-deck operations with United States Navy's USS Saratoga, before returning to the UK. After re-equipping with AS.4s in December, the squadron conducted additional missions to both northern and Mediterranean waters, ultimately disbanding at RNAS Culdrose (HMS Seahawk), Cornwall, in July 1958.

=== Whirlwind (1958–1960) ===
In September 1958, the squadron reformed on Westland Whirlwind HAS.7 anti-submarine helicopters, moving to RNAS Portland (HMS Osprey), Dorset, when engine trouble started to plague the Whirlwinds.

The final iteration of the Whirlwind utilised in FAA operations was the HAS.7, which was equipped with a British engine, the Alvis Leonides Mk.5. This model featured a torpedo bay. The prototype made its inaugural flight on 17 October 1956. The HAS.7 was specifically engineered for front-line operations in the anti-submarine role, marking it as the first British helicopter designed for such tasks. Its equipment comprised radar and dipping Asdic for the purpose of submarine detection. Between April and November 1959, the HAS.7s were taken out of service to undergo modifications to both the engine and transmission systems. The first operational squadron to return to service with the upgraded Whirlwinds was 815.

The squadron eventually disbanded here in August 1959 by being renumbered to 737 Naval Air Squadron. The squadron reformed again on 8 September 1959, still on Whirlwinds and after a Far East tour on HMS Albion, it disbanded again in December 1960.

=== Wessex (1961-1966) ===
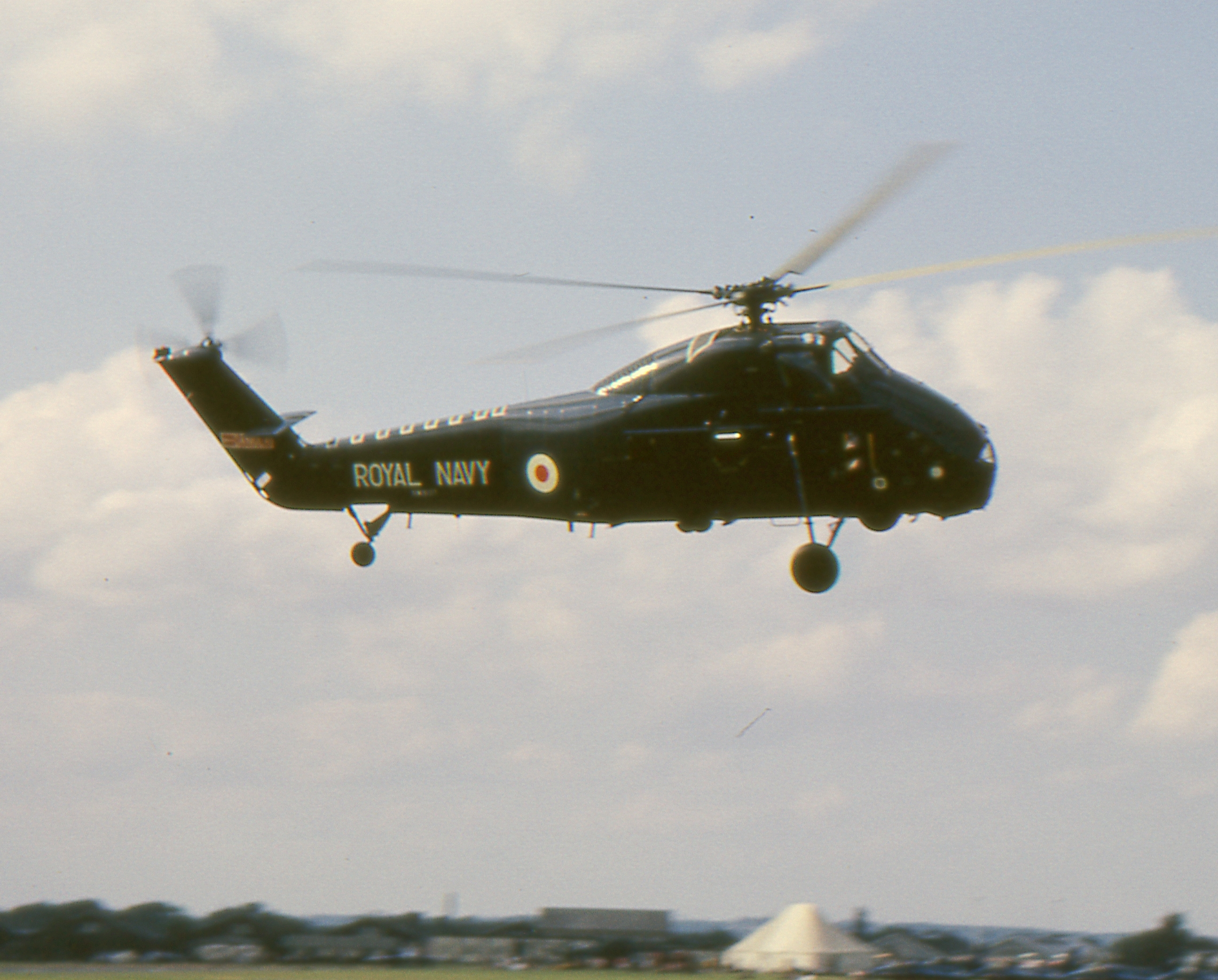
A Westland Wessex, probably HAS.1 XM837 at the SBAC show Farnborough 1962

Developed as a substitute for the Whirlwind within the FAA, the Westland Wessex holds the distinction of being the first helicopter globally to be produced in significant numbers utilising a free gas turbine as its power source. The Wessex was the inaugural helicopter procured by the FAA that was specifically designed from the beginning to function as an anti-submarine aircraft. Equipped with an automatic pilot, it was capable of operating during both day and night across all weather conditions. The first operational unit of the FAA to receive the Wessex HAS.1 was 815, under the command of Lieutenant Commander A.L.L Skinner, RN, which was commissioned at RNAS Culdrose on 4 July 1961.

Equipped with eight Wessex HAS. 1s, it embarked on HMS Ark Royal for the Mediterranean in November; however, engine defects required a return from Malta aboard HMS Victorious, an Illustrious-class aircraft carrier, in December for modifications. By March 1962, the aircraft were ready to return to the Mediterranean on HMS Ark Royal, subsequently proceeding to the Far East. It was later honoured with the annual Boyd Trophy for its pioneering efforts in bringing the Wessex HAS. 1 into service.

In October 1963, a unit relocated twenty endangered Hunter's hartebeest antelopes from an irrigation project area to a safe habitat in Tsavo National Park, Kenya. By the end of the year, the squadron had reached Aden and completed one-hundred and twenty-four sorties to support Army operations against insurgents in the Radfan region in January 1964. They then joined the lead ship of her class HMS Centaur to land 45 Commando in Tanganyika to assist with a mutiny. In June 1965, the squadron re-joined HMS Ark Royal for a Far East deployment, including a visit to Australia in December. After a final deployment on HMS Ark Royal, the unit disbanded at RNAS Culdrose in October 1966.

=== Lynx (1981-2017) ===
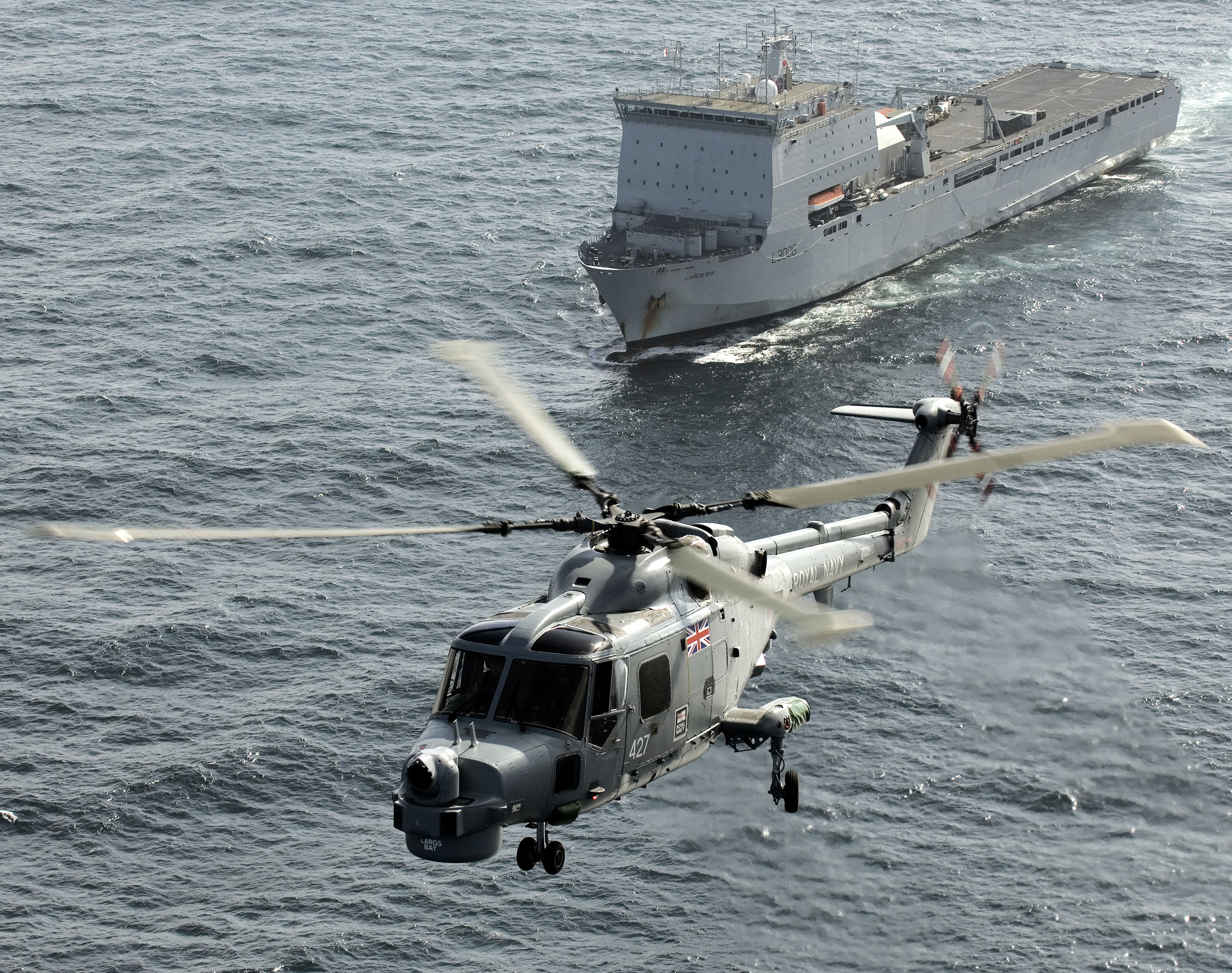
A Westland Lynx HMA.8 of 815 NAS

In January 1981, after a gap of some 15 years, the squadron re-commissioned at RNAS Yeovilton (HMS Heron) with the Lynx HAS.2 as the Headquarters Squadron for embarked Lynx Flights. It then moved to RNAS Portland (HMS Osprey) in 1982 and it saw action during the Falklands War of 1982. The flights were shared with 829 Naval Air Squadron until they were amalgamated in 1993, to become the largest helicopter squadron in the world. In 1998–99 after an absence of nearly 17 years, the unit moved back to RNAS Yeovilton, with the closure of RNAS Portland.

In September 2000 a Lynx Helicopter from 815 NAS took part in Operation Barras. The aircraft, flown by Lt Cdr Al Jones and Lt Nigel Cunningham as the Observer flew over 30 missions deep into the Sierra Leone Jungle. In 2002, a Lynx from 815 Squadron crashed into the Atlantic Ocean while participating in a joint British–American exercise, with the loss of the pilot, Lieutenant Rod Skidmore and observer, Lieutenant Jenny Lewis. Several of the Lynx helicopters are stated as part of the Response Force Task Group. In July 2012, three Lynx helicopters supported the Olympics security operation embarked on HMS Ocean tasked with intercepting aircraft that entered restricted airspace. In November 2012, the Lynx of 217 Flight deployed to the Horn of Africa for four months on board the French frigate Surcouf, the first extended deployment of a British helicopter on a French warship. The retirement of the Lynx fleet began in December 2014 and was completed in March 2017.

=== Wildcat (2016-present) ===
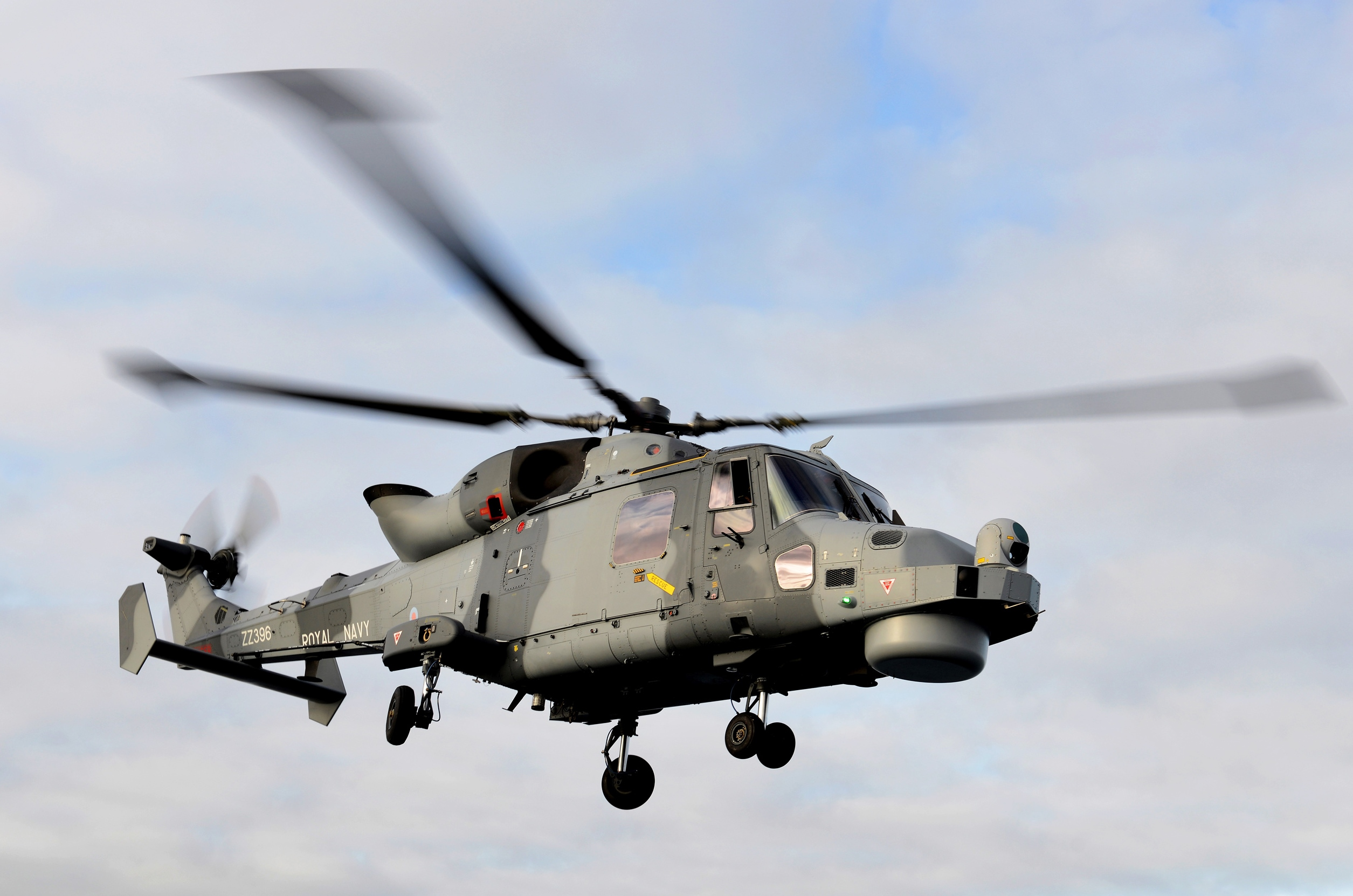
The Wildcat HMA2 is currently the Fleet Air Arm's standard small shipborne helicopter.

The squadron currently operates the AgustaWestland Wildcat HMA.2 which replaced the Lynx HMA.8. The squadron received the first four of twelve Wildcats in April 2016.

The primary function of the Wildcat HMA2 is to provide lethal firepower. This objective can be accomplished through Air to Surface missions that utilise the sophisticated Martlet and Sea Venom missiles, or the M3M heavy machine gun. Moreover, it is equipped to engage in Air-to-air combat with the Martlet missile or perform Air to Sub-Surface strikes using the Sting Ray torpedo. In addition, the Wildcat HMA2 possesses the capability to carry out a wide range of secondary tasks, including reconnaissance, drug trafficking interdiction, search and rescue missions, load lifting, fast roping, troop transport, and offering Humanitarian Aid and Disaster Relief (HADR).

The squadron is composed of a Headquarters and fifteen flights and an attached Maritime Interdiction (MI) Flight. The squadron's Small Ship's Flights embark in Type 23 frigates, Type 45 destroyers or Royal Fleet Auxiliary ships. In September 2018, 213 Flight conducted the first Wildcat landing on a Queen Elizabeth-class aircraft carrier. The Maritime Interdiction (MI) Flight is maintained at high readiness to provide support and assistance to counter-terrorism in the UK.

In 2014, the Navy said after the squadron completes the transition from the Lynx to the Wildcat the squadron would consist of twelve single-manned flights at readiness for deployed operations worldwide and two double-manned Maritime Counter Terrorism (MCT) flights at very high readiness in the UK.

In January 2026, the crew of a Wildcat HMA.2 from 815 Squadron participated in trials known as Eagles Eye, which were conducted at Predannack airfield located on Cornwall's Lizard Peninsula. They received information almost instantaneously from two small surveillance drones, specifically a Puma and a UAV Aerosystems Providence, along with data from various ground-based sensors to accurately target a moving vehicle. This marked a significant milestone as the first instance where Royal Navy helicopters utilised live data from multiple drones to engage a moving target.

== Aircraft flown ==
A compilation of aircraft that have been piloted by 815 Naval Air Squadron. The squadron currently operates the Wildcat HMA.2:

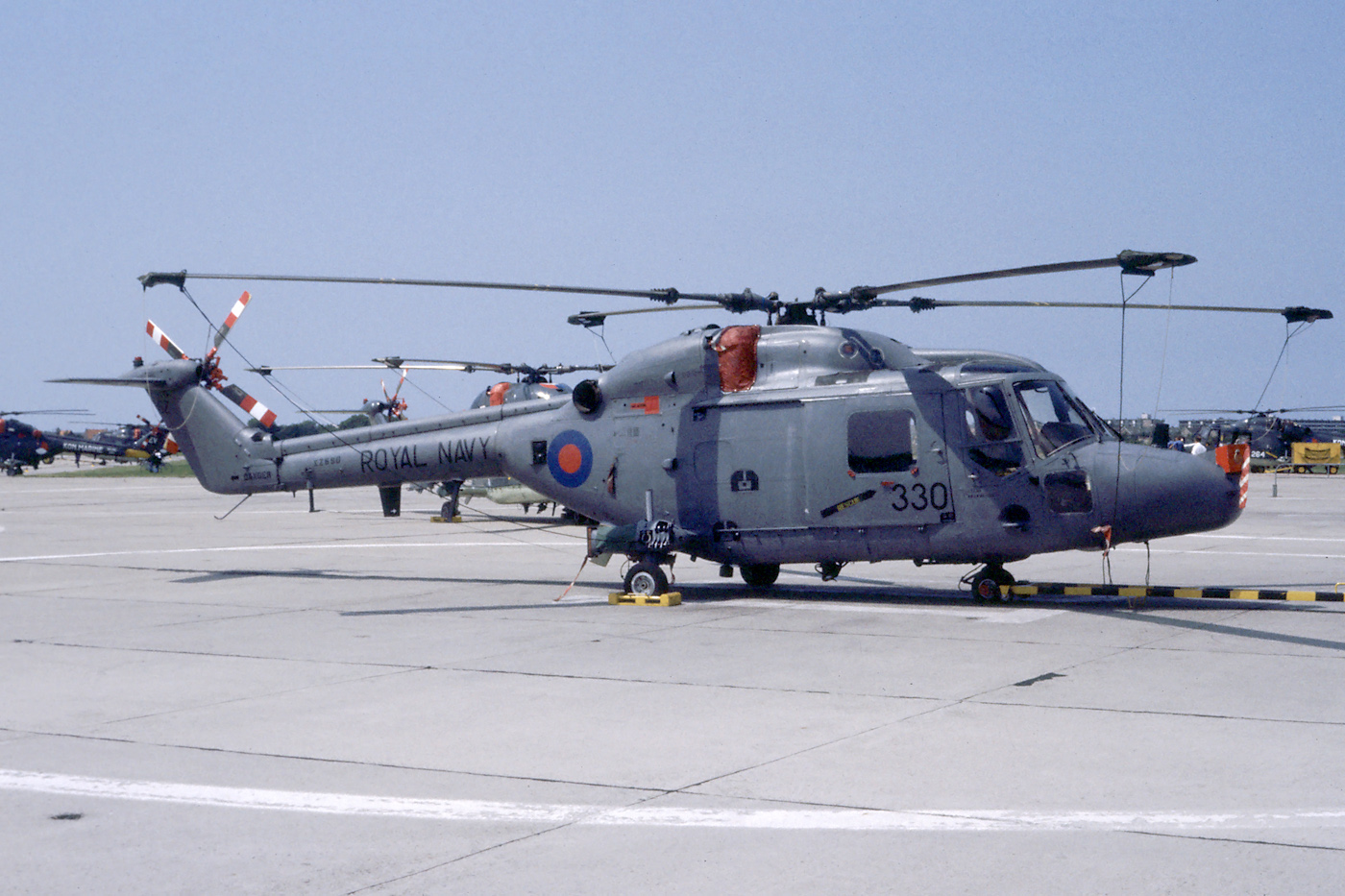
Westland Lynx HAS2 of 815 Squadron

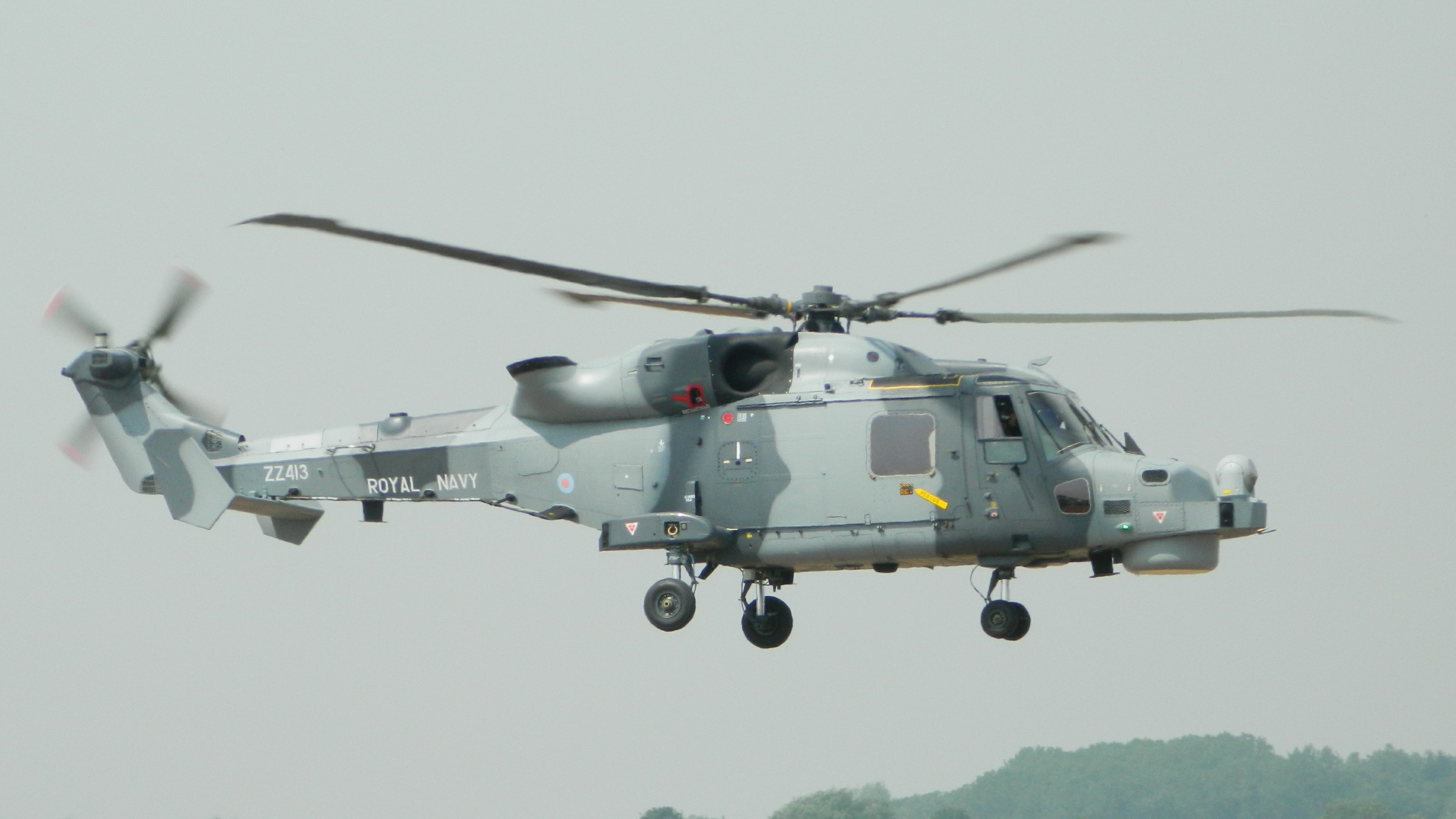
Wildcat HMA2, currently operated by 815 NAS

- Fairey Swordfish I (October 1939 - February 1943)
- Fairey Albacore (October 1941 - July 1943)
- Fairey Fulmar Mk.II (September 1942 - July 1943)
- Fairey Fulmar Mk.I (March - July 1943)
- Fairey Swordfish II (March - July 1943)
- Fairey Barracuda Mk II (October 1943 - October 1944, December 1944 - April 1945)
- Fairey Barracuda Mk III (January - June 1945, August 1945, October 1945 - January 1946, December 1947 - May 1953)
- Grumman Wildcat Mk VI (April - May 1945)
- Grumman Avenger TBM-3E (May 1953 - January 1954)
- Grumman Avenger AS4 (January - July 1954)
- Grumman Avenger AS5 (July 1954 - October 1955)
- Fairey Gannet AS.1 (February 1956 - November 1957)
- Fairey Gannet T.2 (February - September 1956)
- Fairey Gannet AS.4 (December 1957 - July 1958)
- Westland Whirlwind HAS.7 (October 1958 - Match 1959, September 1959 - December 1960)
- Westland Whirlwind HAR.3 (January - August 1959)
- Westland Wessex HAS.1 (July 1961 - October 1966)
- Westland Lynx HAS.2 (January 1981 - September 1988)
- Westland Lynx HAS.3 (November 1982 - March 2013)
- Westland Lynx HMA.8 (July 1994 - March 2017)
- AgustaWestland Wildcat HMA.2 (April 2016 - date)

== Battle honours ==
The battle honours awarded to 815 Naval Air Squadron are:

- North Sea 1940
- Mediterranean 1940–42
- Taranto 1940
- Libya 1940–42
- Matapan 1941
- East Indies 1944
- Falkland Islands 1982
- Kuwait 1991

== Assignments ==
815 Naval Air Squadron was assigned as needed to form part of a number of larger units:

- 52nd Naval TBR Wing (26 November 1943 - 24 January 1944)
- 12th Naval TBR Wing (24 January 1944 - 28 December 1944)

== Commanding officers ==
List of commanding officers of 815 Naval Air Squadron, with date of appointment:

1939

- Lieutenant Commander S. Borrett, RN, from 9 October 1939
- disbanded - 10 November 1939

1939 - 1943

- Lieutenant Commander S. Borrett, RN, from 23 November 1939
- Lieutenant Commander R.A. Kilroy, RN, from 17 April 1940 (Commander, DSC 30 June 1940)
- Lieutenant Commander K. Williamson, RN, from 3 August 1940 (PoW 11 November 1940)
- Lieutenant Commander J.deF. Jago, RN, from 16 November 1940 (PoW 14 March 1941)
- Lieutenant Commander F.M.A. Torrens-Spence, RN, from 15 March 1941
- Lieutenant Commander T.P. Coode, RN, from 27 October 1941
- Lieutenant Commander P.D. Gick, DSC, RN, from 14 December 1941
- Lieutenant Commander A.R. Hallet, RN, from 29 September 1942
- Lieutenant Commander T.G.C. Jameson, RN, from 15 November 1942
- Lieutenant Commander(A) J.W.G. Wellham, DSC, RN, from 7 December 1942
- disbanded - 24 July 1943

1943 - 1946

- Lieutenant Commander(A) R.G. Lawson, RNVR, from 1 October 1943
- Lieutenant Commander D. Norcock, RN, from 23 December 1944 (KiFA 2 January 1945)
- Lieutenant Commander(A) J.S. Bailey, OBE, RN, from 5 January 1945
- Lieutenant Commander(A) M.H. Meredith, DSC, RNVR, from 18 April 1945
- disbanded - 11 January 1946

1947 - 1955

- Lieutenant Commander K.S. Pattisson, DSC, RN, from 1 December 1947
- Lieutenant Commander(A) D.M.R. Wynne-Roberts, RN, from 1 February 1949 (died in accident 5 October 1949)
- Lieutenant D.W. Pennick, RN, from 6 October 1949
- Lieutenant Commander C. Muray, RN, from 16 January 1950
- Lieutenant Commander S.S. Laurie, RN, from 22 September 1950
- Lieutenant Commander C.R.J. Coron, RN, from 12 March 1951
- Lieutenant Commander L.P. Dunne, DSC, RN, from 1 April 1952
- Lieutenant Commander C.W. Rusbeidger, RN, from 18 June 1953
- Lieutenant Commander F. Bromilow, RN, from 30 October 1954
- disbanded - 13 October 1955

1956 - 1958

- Lieutenant Commander J.P. David, RN, from 6 February 1956
- Lieutenant Commander J.K. Mortimer, RN, from 20 July 1957
- disbanded - 15 July 1958

1958 - 1959

- Lieutenant Commander H.M.A. Hayes, RN, from 1 October 1958
- disbanded - 28 August 1959

1959 - 1960

- Lieutenant Commander A.G. Cornabe, RN, from 8 September 1959
- disbanded - 16 December 1960

1961 - 1966

- Lieutenant Commander A.L.L. Skinner, RN, from 4 July 1961
- Lieutenant Commander J.R.T. Bluett, RN, from 1 October 1962
- Lieutenant Commander G.A. Bagnall, RN, from 30 April 1964
- Lieutenant Commander J.E. Kelly, RN, from 9 April 1965
- disbanded - 7 October 1966

1981 - present

- Lieutenant Commander D.H.N. Yates, RN, from 6 January 1981
- Lieutenant Commander R.I. Money, RN, from 14 May 1982
- Lieutenant Commander M.G.B. Manning, RN, from 16 December 1983
- Lieutenant Commander R.A. Goddard, AFC, RN, from 18 March 1986 (Commander 30 December 1986)
- Lieutenant Commander R.K. O'Neill, RN, from 28 April 1987
- Lieutenant Commander T.N.E. Williams, RN, from 2 March 1989
- Lieutenant Commander A.A. Rich, RN, from 30 August 1989
- Lieutenant Commander S.J. Isacke, RN, from 13 March 1990
- Lieutenant Commander C.G.T. Wilson, RN, from 6 September 1991
- Lieutenant Commander P.A. McKay, RN, from 26 April 1993
- Lieutenant Commander R.L. Bourne, RN, from 9 November 1993
- Lieutenant Commander M.P. Davis, RN, from 19 December 1995
- Lieutenant Commander A.l. Harris, RN, from 8 January 1998
- Lieutenant Commander J.H. Reed, RN, from 31 August 1999
- Lieutenant Commander A.M. Cramp, RN, from 20 December 2000
- Lieutenant Commander D.P. Salisbury, RN, from 15 November 2002 (Commander 30 June 2003)
- Commander W.N. Entwisle, OBE, MVO, RN, from 11 October 2004
- Commander A.D. Jones, RN, from 13 November 2006
- Commander J.P. Bowers, RN, from 9 December 2008
- Commander L.M. Wilson-Chalon, RN, from 15 December 2010
- Commander A.J. Haigh, RN, from 22 April 2013
- Commander P.C. Richardson, RN, from 10 April 2015

Note: Abbreviation (A) signifies Air Branch of the RN or RNVR.

== See also ==
- George Zambellas - Former First Sea Lord and Chief of the Naval Staff and former 815 Squadron pilot
- Andrew Mountbatten-Windsor - Member of the British royal family and former 815 Squadron senior pilot
- Exercise Strikeback
