= Worshipful Company of Shipwrights =

Livery company of the City of London

Shipwrights' Company
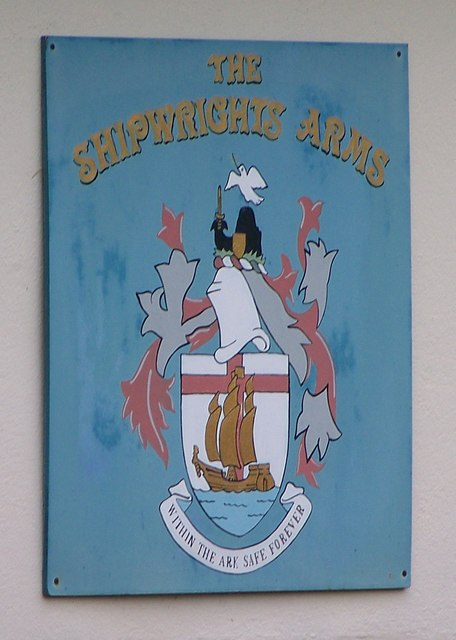
- Motto: "Within The Ark; Safe For Ever"
- Location: Ironmongers' Hall, London EC2, United Kingdom
- Date of formation: 1782
- Company association: Shipbuilding, maritime industries
- Order of precedence: 59th
- Master of company: King Charles III
- Website: www.shipwrights.co.uk

The Worshipful Company of Shipwrights is one of the ancient livery companies of the City of London.

Although the Shipwrights' Company is no longer a shipbuilding trade association representing solely London-based industry, through its membership it retains strong links with global trade, and maritime and shipping professions.

The Company ranks fifty-ninth in the City livery order of precedence and is based at Ironmongers' Hall, where it cohabits with the Ironmongers' Company.

Its motto is "Within the Ark Safe for Ever".

== History of establishment ==
The Shipwrights' Company, unlike other livery companies, has not received a Royal Charter because maritime trade by definition was never confined within the boundaries of the Square Mile; instead a corporate body of London shipwrights grew over time, their first recorded reference being in the twelfth century; thus the Company's status is considered as being incorporated "by prescription".

By contrast, a Royal Charter was issued in 1612 to the "Master, Wardens, and Commonalty of the Art or Mystery of Shipwrights of Redriff (i.e. Rotherhithe) in the County of Surrey". This led to a dispute about jurisdiction between the two companies, being resolved in 1684 when the Rotherhithe charter was cancelled.

The Shipwrights' Company received confirmation of its City of London livery status in 1782.

== Membership ==
Ever since Queen Victoria's reign the Company continues to enjoy a special connection with the Royal Family, several of whom are liverymen today; Having served on the Court of Assistants since 1986, Prince Charles was installed on 10 May 2011 as Prime Warden for 2011/12, before succeeding his father, Lord High Admiral Prince Philip, Duke of Edinburgh, as Permanent Master Shipwright on 16 February 2012. Prince Philip was elected Prime Warden Shipwright (for 1954/55) and became the Company's longest-serving Permanent Master (1955–2012). King Charles III succeeded his mother as Patron in 2024, when the Shipwrights' Permanent Mastership merged with the Crown.

Whilst sons and daughters of members can join as freemen of the Company, only those with a professional maritime background (military or commercial) may become liverymen. The Company supports maritime research, numerous charities, as well as the work of the Lord Mayor of London, the City of London Corporation and the Sheriffs of the City of London. The Company is also involved in charitable educational activities, which includes the support of the London Nautical School and George Green's School in London.

The current Clerk to the Shipwrights' Company is Lt-Col. Richard Cole-Mackintosh, whose role combines that of executive officer as well as supporting the Prime Warden: Simon Beale (for 2024/25).

The Company's Honorary Chaplain is the Revd Canon Bill Christianson.

== Arms ==
Coat of arms of Worshipful Company of Shipwrights
Crest On a wreath of the Colours, an Ark Sable resting upon a Mount Vert, a Dove bearing an Olive branch Proper, and for difference in the prow of the ark a Sword as in the Arms. Escutcheon Azure, in a Sea Proper the Hull of a Ship Or and for difference in the dexter chief point a Sword erect, point upward, of the Last; on a Chief Argent a Cross Gules charged with a Lion passant guardant Or. Motto Within the Ark Safe for Ever.

== See also ==
- Shipbuilding (Shipwrights' origin)
- The Lord Mountevans (Lord Mayor and Shipwright)
- Admiral Sir George Zambellas (Renter Warden 2024/25)
- Zunft (Germanic equivalent)
