= Fleet Commander =

British Royal Navy post

- Ensign of the Royal Navy

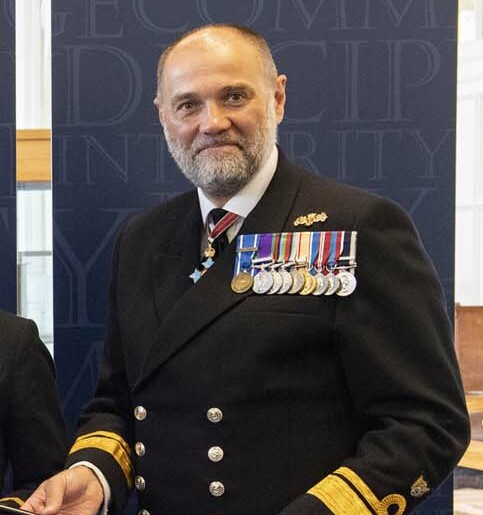
- Incumbent; Vice Admiral Steve Moorhouse since 5 September 2025
- Ministry of Defence; Royal Navy
- Member of: Admiralty Board, Navy Board, Navy Command
- Reports to: First Sea Lord
- Nominator: Secretary of State for Defence, on advice from the Defence Council
- Appointer: Prime Minister; Subject to formal approval by the King-in-Council
- Term length: Not fixed (typically 1–4 years)
- Inaugural holder: Admiral George Zambellas
- Formation: 2012

Fleet Commander is a senior Royal Navy post, responsible for the operation, resourcing and training of the ships, submarines and aircraft, and personnel, of the Naval Service. The vice-admiral incumbent is required to provide ships, submarines and aircraft ready for operations, and is based at the fleet headquarters at HMS Excellent, Whale Island.

The post was created in April 2012 following a reorganisation of the Royal Navy and a downgrading in rank of the former role of Commander-in-Chief Fleet.

== Responsibilities ==
The fleet commander's purpose is to provide ships, submarines and aircraft ready for any operations that the government requires.

The fleet commander's major subordinates included as of September 2020:

- Commander Operations
- Commander United Kingdom Strike Force
- Director Force Generation - Commodore Steve Moorhouse was promoted to Rear Admiral and became Director 14 January 2022 on the promotion of Martin Connell to Vice Admiral and Connell's appointment as Second Sea Lord.
- Commandant General Royal Marines

The previous post of Assistant Chief of the Naval Staff (Training)/Flag Officer Sea Training was disestablished in May-June 2020. It was superseded by Commander Fleet Operational Sea Training, and in the process the senior Sea Training officer was regraded downwards from a rear admiral to a commodore.

The British Army equivalent is Commander Field Army. The RAF's Air and Space Commander is the close equivalent of the two positions.

== List of fleet commanders ==
=== Fleet Commander ===
Fleet Commander and Deputy Chief of Naval Staff
| Image | Rank | Name | Term began | Term ended |
|---|---|---|---|---|
| | Admiral | Sir George Zambellas | April 2012 | December 2012 |
| | Vice Admiral | Sir Philip Jones | December 2012 | February 2016 |
Fleet Commander and Chief Naval Warfare Officer
| | Vice Admiral | Ben Key | February 2016 | March 2019 |
| | Vice Admiral | Jerry Kyd | March 2019 | September 2021 |
| | Vice Admiral | Andrew Burns | September 2021 | September 2025 |
| | Vice Admiral | Steve Moorhouse | September 2025 | |

=== Deputy Fleet Commander ===
- April–December 2012: Vice Admiral Sir Philip Jones
- Position Vacant

== See also ==
- List of serving senior officers of the Royal Navy
