= 817 Naval Air Squadron =

Defunct flying squadron of the Royal Navy's Fleet Air Arm

- Squadron badge
- Active: 1941–1943; 1943–1945; 1945
- Disbanded: 23 August 1945
- Country: United Kingdom
- Branch: Royal Navy
- Type: Torpedo Bomber Reconnaissance squadron
- Role: Carrier-based: anti-submarine warfare (ASW); anti-surface warfare (ASuW); Close air support (CAS)
- Part of: Fleet Air Arm
- Home station: See Naval air stations section for full list.
- Mottos: Facere animo (Latin for 'To act with spirit or courage')
- Engagements: World War II: European War; Tirpitz; Mediterranean War; Operation Torch; Operation Husky; Pacific War; Operation Millet
- Battle honours: Norway 1941; Biscay 1942; North Africa 1942; Atlantic 1942; Sicily 1943; East Indies 1944

Commanders
- Notable commanders: Lieutenant Commander D. Sanderson, DSC, RN

Insignia
- Squadron Badge Description: Blue, a shark haurient embowed proper pierced by an arrowed red flighted gold in bend sinister (1952)
- Identification Markings: 5A+ (Albacore); 5A+ (Barracuda); 3A+ (Barracuda in Indomitable July 1944); 7A+ (Barracuda April 1945)

Aircraft flown
- Bomber: Fairey Albacore; Fairey Barracuda

817 Naval Air Squadron was a Fleet Air Arm (FAA) naval air squadron of the United Kingdom’s Royal Navy (RN) during the Second World War. The Squadron was last active within the Royal Navy between 1943 and 1945 with Fairey Barracuda aircraft and carried out operations in the Far East before disbanding at the end of the war.

It initially formed in 1941 and the squadron operated Fairey Albacore torpedo bomber aircraft in the Anti-Submarine Warfare role in Icelandic and Mediterranean waters.

The squadron was reformed as 817 Squadron RAN in 1950.

== History ==
=== Torpedo, Spotter, Reconnaissance Squadron (1941-1943) ===
817 Naval Air Squadron formed at RNAS Crail (HMS Jackdaw), Fife, Scotland, on 15 March 1941, as a Torpedo Spotter Reconnaissance (TSR) unit, initially equipped with nine Fairey Albacore biplane torpedo bomber aircraft.

In July, the squadron embarked in the modified as an aircraft carrier Courageous-class battlecruiser converted to an aircraft carrier, HMS Furious, which set sail for an assault on the Arctic port of Petsamo. The subsequent month, the squadron transferred to the Illustrious-class aircraft carrier, HMS Victorious, to conduct operations in the Barents Sea region. This was succeeded by a series of attacks on shipping in Vestfjorden during September and October.

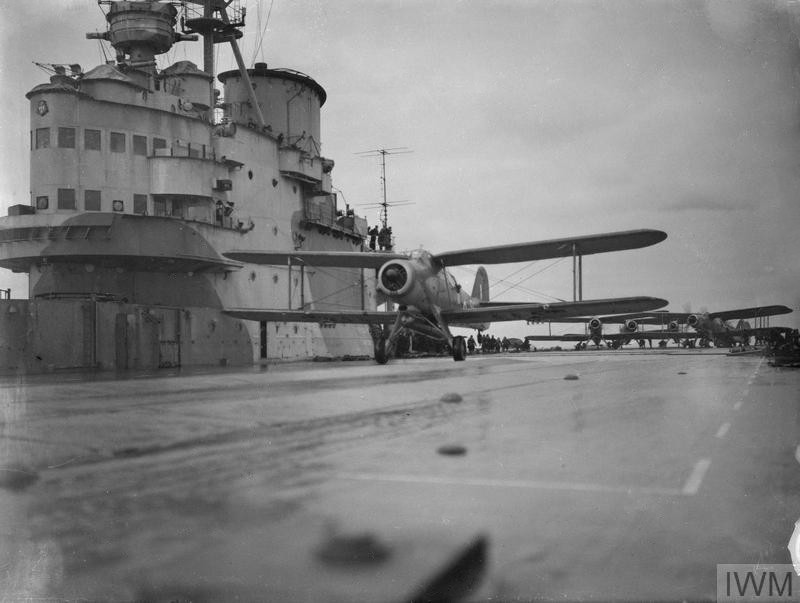
Fairey Albacore aircraft taking off from HMS Victorious to attack the German battleship Tirpitz on 9 March 1942

The operations involved maintaining a presence with the carrier while utilising RNAS Hatston (HMS Sparrowhawk), Mainland, Orkney, as a land-based support facility. An attempted torpedo strike against the German battleship Tirpitz on 9 March 1942, did not achieve its intended objective. In July, activities were conducted in the Bear Island region.

In October, the squadron reboarded HMS Victorious to participate in the Allied landings in North Africa, Operation Torch. During this operation, a bombing raid was conducted against a fort located at Algiers Harbour on 8 November. Subsequently, on 21 November, one of the squadron's aircraft successfully targeted and sank German submarine U-517 in the North Atlantic.

Following its return home, 817 Naval Air Squadron re-joined HMS Furious at Scapa Flow in February 1943, subsequently transferring to the Illustrious-class fleet carrier HMS Indomitable the following month. Upon the completion of its work-up period, the ship departed for the Mediterranean to support the landings in Sicily, Operation Avalanche, operating with an augmented complement of fifteen aircraft. However, on 16 July, the vessel sustained significant damage due to a torpedo strike.

HMS Indomitable subsequently proceeded to the United States for repairs; however, the majority of 817 Naval Air Squadron was disembarked at RN Air Section Gibraltar at RAF North Front, with only 'Z' Flight remaining on board. This contingent later disembarked to RN Air Section Norfolk, situated at the United States Navy's Naval Air Station Norfolk, Virginia, where they transferred their aircraft to Trinidad for 750 Naval Air Squadron at RNAS Piarco (HMS Goshawk).

The majority of the squadron had already landed at Gibraltar, where it officially disbanded on 1 September 1943.

=== Torpedo, Bomber, Reconnaissance Squadron (1943-1945) ===
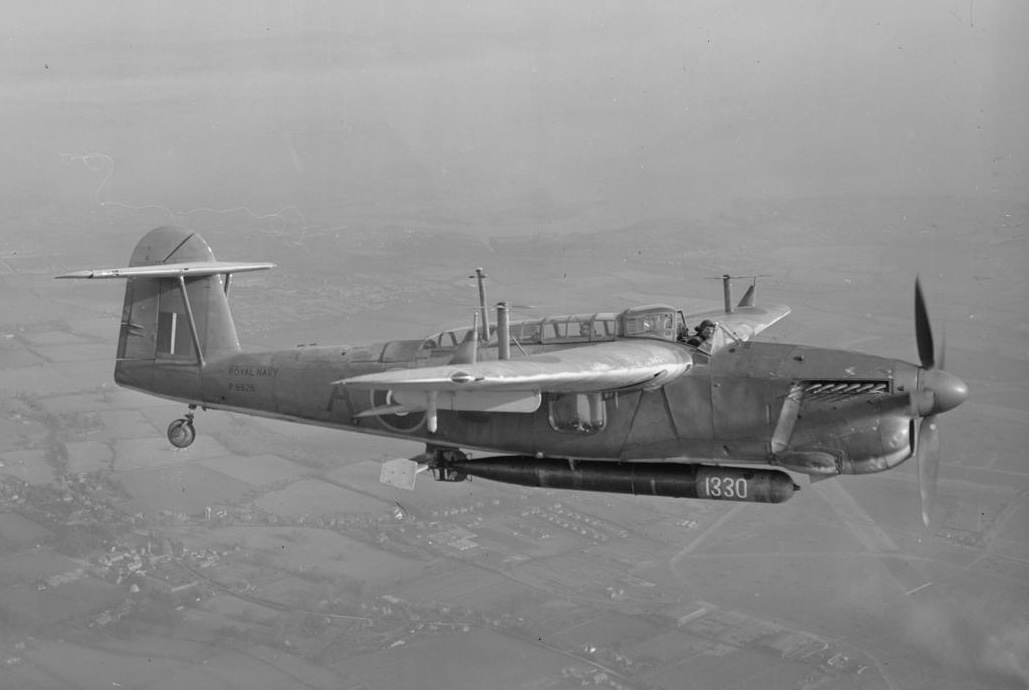
Fairey Barracuda Mk II

The squadron reformed at RNAS Lee-on-Solent (HMS Daedalus), Hampshire, on 1 December 1943 and the unit retained its commanding officer, but incorporated twelve new Fairey Barracuda aircraft, a torpedo and dive bomber. In January 1944, it became part of the 12th Naval TBR Wing and embarked on the Ruler-class escort carrier, HMS Begum, for the journey to Ceylon. During its time in Ceylon, the Wing conducted operations from land bases before reuniting with HMS Indomitable on 23 July 1943.

In the subsequent month, a bombing raid was executed in Sumatra, which was succeeded by another attack in September and followed by operations in the Nicobar region in October. In November, 817 Naval Air Squadron was reassigned to HMS Unicorn and departed for South Africa, returning to southern India after spending several weeks on land.

The squadron experienced the loss of its aircraft due to a tropical storm. Following this incident, the crews returned home, leading to the disbandment of the squadron on 21 February 1945.

817 Naval Air Squadron was reformed just over five weeks later at RNAS Rattray (HMS Merganser), Aberdeenshire, on 1 April 1945 and was equipped with eighteen Fairey Barracuda Mk II aircraft, which were outfitted with the AN/APS-04, an American ASV radar system. In April, the squadron relocated to RNAS Fearn (HMS Owl), Scottish Highlands, where it prepared to integrate with the 21st Carrier Air Group aboard a Colossus-class aircraft carrier. However, following Victory over Japan Day (V-J Day), the squadron was deemed unnecessary and was officially disbanded on 23 August.

== Aircraft flown ==
The squadron has operated a couple of different aircraft types:

- Fairey Albacore Mk I torpedo bomber (March 1941 – August 1943)
- Fairey Barracuda Mk II torpedo and dive bomber (December 1943 - January 1945)
- Fairey Barracuda Mk II (ASV) torpedo and dive bomber (April 1945 – August 1945)

== Battle honours ==
The battle honours awarded to 817 Naval Air Squadron are:

- Norway 1941
- North Africa 1942
- Biscay 1942
- Atlantic 1942
- Sicily 1943
- East Indies 1944

== Assignments ==
817 Naval Air Squadron was assigned as needed to form part of a number of larger units:

- 12th Naval TBR Wing (24 January 1944 - 28 December 1944)

== Naval air stations and aircraft carriers ==
817 Naval Air Squadron operated from a number of naval air stations of the Royal Navy and Royal Air Force stations, in the UK and overseas, and also a number of Royal Navy fleet carriers and escort carriers and other airbases overseas:

1941 - 1943

- Royal Naval Air Station Crail (HMS Jackdaw), Fife, (15 March - 15 July 1941)
- HMS Furious (15 July - 5 August 1941)
- HMS Victorious (5 - 7 August 1941)
- Royal Naval Air Station Hatston (HMS Sparrowhawk), Mainland, Orkney, (7 - 14 August 1941)
- HMS Victorious (14 August - 13 October 1941)
  - Royal Naval Air Station Twatt (HMS Tern), Mainland, Orkney, (Detachment six aircraft 20 - 23 September 1941)
- Royal Naval Air Station Donibristle (HMS Merlin), Fife, (13 - 26 October 1941)
  - HMS Victorious (Detachment four aircraft 19 - 26 October 1941)
- Royal Naval Air Station Hatston (HMS Sparrowhawk), Mainland, Orkney, (26 October - 3 November 1941)
- HMS Victorious (3 - 30 November 1941)
- Royal Naval Air Station Hatston (HMS Sparrowhawk), Mainland, Orkney, (30 November - 23 December 1941)
- HMS Victorious (23 December 1941 - 2 January 1942)
- Royal Naval Air Station Hatston (HMS Sparrowhawk), Mainland, Orkney, (2 - 17 January 1942)
- HMS Victorious (17 January - 23 February 1942)
- Royal Naval Air Station Hatston (HMS Sparrowhawk), Mainland, Orkney, (23 February - 4 March 1942)
- HMS Victorious (4 March - 16 June 1942)
- Royal Naval Air Station Hatston (HMS Sparrowhawk), Mainland, Orkney, (16 - 29 June 1942)
- HMS Victorious (29 June - 10 July 1942)
- Royal Naval Air Station Hatston (HMS Sparrowhawk), Mainland, Orkney, (10 July - 8 October 1942)
  - HMS Victorious (Detachment two aircraft 30 July - 23 August 1942)
- HMS Victorious (8 October - 23 November 1942)
- Royal Naval Air Station Machrihanish (HMS Landrail), Argyll and Bute, (23 November - 11 December 1942)
- HMS Furious (11 - 14 December 1942)
- Royal Naval Air Station Hatston (HMS Sparrowhawk), Mainland, Orkney, (14 December 1942 - 12 February 1943)
- HMS Furious (12 February - 11 March 1943)
- HMS Indomitable (11 - 17 March 1943)
- Royal Naval Air Station Machrihanish (HMS Landrail), Argyll and Bute, (17 - 21 March 1943)
- HMS Indomitable (21 March - 19 July 1943)
- RN Air Section Gibraltar, Gibraltar, (19 July - 31 August 1943)
  - HMS Indomitable 'Z' Flight (29 July - 20 August 1943)
  - RN Air Section Norfolk, Virginia, (20 - 31 August 1943), Royal Naval Air Station Piarco (HMS Goshawk), Trinidad, - disbanded (31 August 1943)

1943 - 1945

- Royal Naval Air Station Lee-on-Solent (HMS Daedalus), Hampshire, (1 December 1943 - 14 January 1944)
- Royal Naval Air Station Machrihanish (HMS Landrail), Argyll and Bute, (14 January - 8 February 1944)
- Royal Air Force Tain, Highlands, (8 - 26 February 1944)
- HMS Begum (26 February - 3 March 1944)
- SS Strathneven/SS Aronda (crews) (3 March - 10 April 1944)
- Royal Air Force St Thomas Mount, India, (10 - 14 April 1944)
- Royal Air Force Ulunderpet, India, (14 April - 1 June 1944)
- RN Air Section China Bay, Ceylon, (1 - 15 June 1944)
- Royal Naval Air Station Katukurunda (HMS Ukussa), Ceylon, (15 June - 23 July 1944)
- HMS Indomitable (23 July - 27 September 1944)
- Royal Naval Air Station Katukurunda (HMS Ukussa), Ceylon, (27 September - 8 October 1944)
- HMS Indomitable (8 - 20 October 1944)
- Royal Naval Air Station Trincomalee (HMS Bambara), Ceylon, (20 October - 7 November 1944)
- HMS Unicorn (7 - 18 November 1944)
- RN Air Section Durban (HMS Kongoni), South Africa, (18 November 1944 - 1 January 1945)
- HMS Unicorn (1 - 13 January 1945)
- Royal Naval Air Station Sulur (HMS Vairi), India, (13 - 19 January 1945)
- HMS Unicorn (crews) (19 January - 21 February 1945)
- disbanded UK - (21 February 1945)

1945

- Royal Naval Air Station Rattray (HMS Merganser), Aberdeenshire, (1 - 27 April 1945)
- Royal Naval air Station Fearn (HMS Owl), Scottish Highlands, (27 April - 23 August 1945)
  - HMS Pretoria Castle (Detachment seven aircraft 19 - 23 August 1945)
- disbanded - (23 August 1945)

== Commanding officers ==
List of commanding officers of 817 Naval Air Squadron, with date of appointment:

1941 - 1943

- Lieutenant Commander D. Sanderson, DSC, RN, from 15 March 1941
- Lieutenant Commander P.G. Sugden, RN, from 23 February 1942
- Lieutenant L.E.D. Walthall, DSC, RN, from 30 June 1942
- Lieutenant Commander N.R. Corbet-Milward, RN, from 21 November 1942
- Lieutenant Commander(A) T.W. May, RNVR, from 7 August 1943
- disbanded - 31 August 1943

1943 - 1945

- Lieutenant Commander(A) T.W. May, RNVR, from 1 December 1943
- disbanded - 21 February 1945

1945

- Lieutenant Commander(A) M.A. Lacayo, RN, from 1 April 1945
- disbanded - 23 August 1945

Note: Abbreviation (A) signifies Air Branch of the RN or RNVR.
