= Operation Banquet =

Last resort British WW2 plan to throw every available aircraft into battle

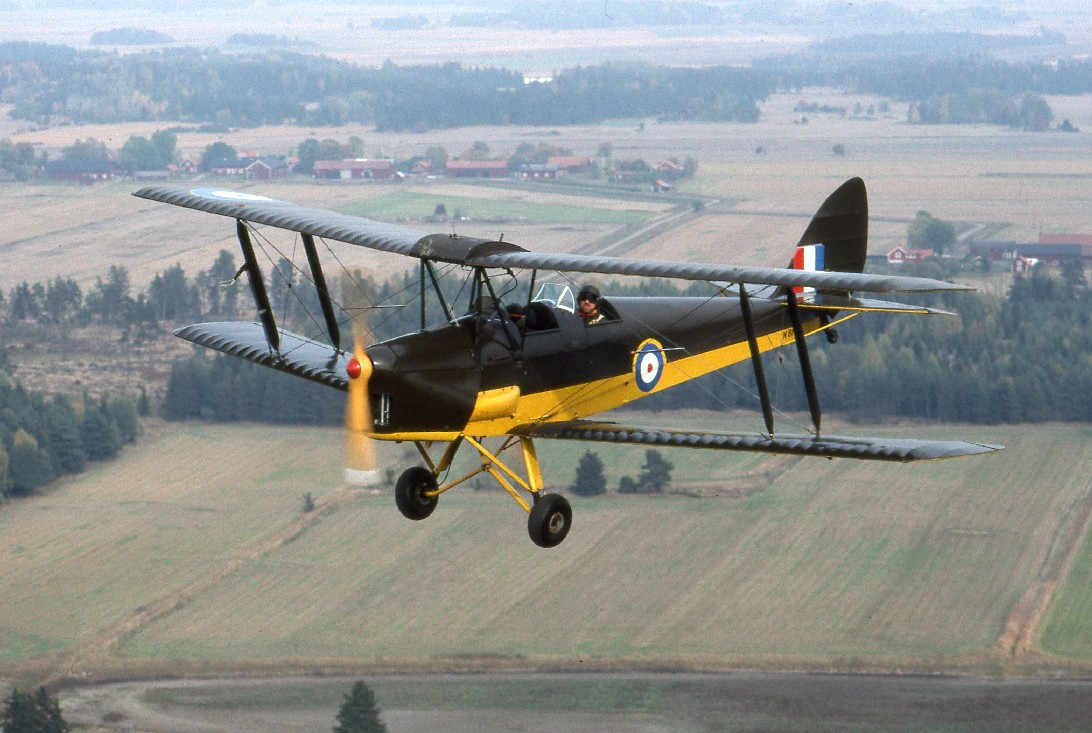
- de Havilland DH 82A Tiger Moth, N81DH
- Planned: 1940–1941
- Planned by: United Kingdom
- Objective: Air Defence of Great Britain
- Executed by: Royal Air Force
- Outcome: Cancelled

Operation Banquet was a British Second World War plan to use every available aircraft against a German invasion in 1940 or 1941. After the Fall of France in June 1940, the British Government made urgent anti-invasion preparations as the Royal Air Force (RAF) engaged the German Luftwaffe in a struggle for air superiority in the Battle of Britain. In May 1940, the Air Ministry had realised that beyond the normal reserves of the RAF, it may be necessary to throw every serviceable aircraft into the battle. On 17 May, an Air Ministry meeting outlined ambitious plans to make use of various aircraft in the event of an invasion.

== Plan ==
On 13 July 1940, the Air Officer Commanding-in-Chief, Training Command, was ordered to plan to make the maximum practical number of aircraft available for operations. The plan was called Operation Banquet and was divided into several operations that could be enacted independently. In Banquet 6 Group, Bomber Command decided to use the aircraft of 6 Group (the Group Pool units, not the later Royal Canadian Air Force) as conventional replacements in the front-line squadrons. Banquet 22 Group would move certain 22 Group (Army Cooperation) aircraft into conventional Bomber Command squadrons. Somewhat desperate were Banquet Alert which called for the employment of Fleet Air Arm training aircraft under Coastal Command and Banquet Training which called for the absorption of aircraft from RAF Training Command into the operational striking force of Bomber Command. Aircraft allocated under Banquet would, in many cases, lack bombsights, armour protection, guns and self-sealing fuel tanks. While these were to be fitted where possible, RAF instructions made it clear that no aircraft was to be considered unfit for want of such niceties; anything that could fly and drop bombs would suffice.

Early in July, about 1,000 aircraft, from Tiger Moths to Wellington bombers at training schools, were ready for anti-invasion operations, with hope of another 1,000 aircraft when the scheme was complete. The use of slow aircraft for ground attack operations was not without precedent, Netherlands Fokker C.Xs, German Henschel Hs 123 and British Hawker Hector biplanes had operated on the continent without unsustainable losses. Against advanced troops without time to establish adequate air defences, slow, highly manoeuvrable aircraft could make accurate ground attacks and escape destruction. Ground crews would go with their aircraft and in some cases this would have involved civilian volunteers. The air crew for Banquet Alert and Training would be the experienced instructors as well as those students that had reached "a reasonably satisfactory standard of training".

Few training schools were close to likely invasion areas and moving them seemed unwise in the chaos of an invasion, when closer airfields would have been bombed and were busy servicing their operational squadrons. It was decided to base four flights of 5–6 basic trainer aircraft to Army Cooperation, Coastal and Bomber command bases, two flights at first and two more if the base commander decided that they could be accommodated. The air bases were widely spread and no swarms of Banquet aircraft would have descended on the landing beaches, the main effort would be by conventional Bomber Command squadrons. Army Cooperation Command was instructed that,

This number may be increased if casualties in the A.C. squadrons have reduced the risks of congestion.

When to implement the Banquet scheme was kept open; if a German landing occurred away from the concentrations of the British army, such as Scotland, the scheme would be put into effect straight away but if a landing came where expected, the aircraft would be used as a last resort, dependent on how swiftly the situation deteriorated.

== Banquet Light ==
Among the Banquet plans was Banquet Light which would see the formation of striking forces composed of De Havilland Tiger Moth biplanes and other light aircraft of Elementary Flying Training Schools. De Havilland put forward plans for converting the Tiger Moth into a bomber by equipping it with eight 20 lb (9 kg) bomb racks beneath the rear cockpit. As an alternative, the bomb-racks could be installed four on each side under the lower planes, which would avoid trimming difficulties. The racks had been designed for the military version of the de Havilland Dragons supplied to Iraq eight years previously. Trials were conducted at Hatfield by Major Hereward de Havilland and at the Aeroplane and Armament Experimental Establishment at Boscombe Down and the machines earned a satisfactory report. Tests were also carried out with a Tiger Moth carrying a 240 lb (109 kg) bomb. Modification of the relatively small number of Miles Magister trainers were also attempted but this proved troublesome and Banquet Light mostly used Tiger Moths.

The Banquet Light strike force would be used for Army co-operation, bombing concentrations of airborne troops or soldiers landing on the beaches. The two-seater Tiger Moth bombers should be flown solo into an attack at low altitude until the enemy was identified, climb to 800 feet (240 m) and dive to 500 feet (150 m) to release the bombs.

Most of the pilots for Banquet Light would be students who had not yet graduated. The scheme required that trainee pilots should be introduced to bombing at an early stage in their instruction, in case they needed to go into action immediately. Instructors were told to "take every opportunity to carry out practice bombing". With no dummy bombs available early in 1940, training exercises were carried out with the aircraft flown from the front cockpit by instructors and house bricks were thrown over the side from the rear cockpit. It was discovered that the bricks fell slower than a diving Tiger Moth and instructions were given to throw the bricks forcefully away from the aircraft.

About 350 aircraft were available but the Moths and their inexperienced pilots would have been vulnerable to enemy aircraft and the plan was widely regarded as suicidal. Consideration was also given to adapting civilian aircraft for Banquet Civil but the idea was dropped.

== Cancellation ==
Operation Banquet was never put into effect but was periodically exercised under various guises. One "exercise" provided secret cover for the temporary reorganisation needed for the first 1,000 bomber raid sent against the city of Cologne on the night of 30/31 May 1942. This plan required considerable reorganisation including the contribution of bombers from Coastal Command and Training Command. Banquet was cancelled in October 1943 having never been put into effect.

== See also ==
- British anti-invasion preparations of World War II
- British hardened field defences of World War II
