= HMS Cattistock (M31) =

1982 Hunt-class mine countermeasures vessel of the Royal Navy

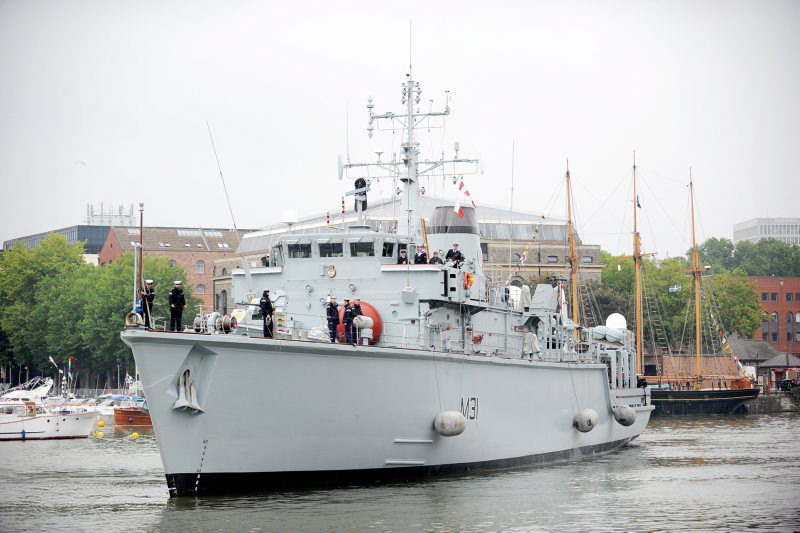
- HMS Cattistock in 2011

History

United Kingdom
- Name: HMS Cattistock
- Operator: Royal Navy
- Ordered: 29 January 1979
- Builder: Vosper Thornycroft
- Launched: 22 January 1981
- Commissioned: 5 March 1982
- Home port: HMNB Portsmouth, Hampshire
- Identification: Pennant number: M31; IMO number: 4906599; MMSI number: 23458000; International call sign: GYHJ
- Honours and awards: Northern Persian Gulf (1990–91)
- Status: in active service

General characteristics
- Class & type: Hunt-class mine countermeasures vessel
- Displacement: 750 t (740 long tons; 830 short tons)
- Length: 60 m (196 ft 10 in)
- Beam: 9.8 m (32 ft 2 in)
- Draught: 2.2 m (7 ft 3 in)
- Propulsion: 2 shaft Napier Deltic diesel, 3,540 shp (from 1981); 2 × Caterpillar C32 Acert diesel engines, 1,900 hp each (since 2015)
- Speed: 17 kn (31 km/h; 20 mph)
- Complement: 48 (5 officers & 43 ratings)
- Sensors & processing systems: Sonar Type 2193
- Electronic warfare & decoys: SeaFox mine disposal system; Diver-placed explosive charges
- Armament: 1 × 30mm DS30B S30GM1; 2 × Miniguns (may be replaced by Browning .50 caliber heavy machine guns as of 2023); 3 × General purpose machine guns

HMS Cattistock, the third ship of this name, is a Hunt-class mine countermeasures vessel of the Royal Navy. She was launched in 1981 and commissioned on 5 March 1982, the third ship of her class.

== Operational history ==
In 1991, she was placed under the command of Sir George Zambellas, who was First Sea Lord from 2013 until 2016.

In July 1997 she suffered an engine room fire and was under repair at Rosyth Dockyard for 14 months. In September 1999 she replaced the minehunter Sandown in the NATO Mine Countermeasures Force North West Europe.

She was mentioned in the media in December 2002 after colliding with a jetty as she was leaving her homeport of HMNB Portsmouth in late November. She was left with a two-foot (0.61 m) hole in her side, although no crew were hurt in the collision. It was the third such collision that year: the submarine Trafalgar ran aground off the Isle of Skye earlier in November and the destroyer Nottingham hit rocks off the coast of Australia in July.

In 2012 she assisted in the location of two Royal Air Force Panavia Tornados which had crashed in the Moray Firth.

From early February 2013 Cattistock led Standing NATO Mine Countermeasures Group 2, in a four-month deployment to the Mediterranean, conducting maritime security operations and providing force protection, and also taking part in a multinational mine hunting exercise (MINEX 13–1) off the coast of Spain in April, before eventually returning to her home port in early May.

In October 2013 she took part in Exercise Joint Warrior. She took part in further training programmes in February 2014, and in April was engaged in survey operations in the approaches to the Clyde Estuary.

In 2014–2015 Cattistock received a major upgrade, including two new Caterpillar C32 diesel engines, at BAE Systems, Portsmouth, eventually returning to active service in November 2015 after 18 months.

In November 2017 Cattistock destroyed a World War II-era 500-pound (230 kg) bomb which had been discovered 50 miles (80 km) off the coast of Norfolk close to a major North Sea gas pipeline.

In early January 2018, she sailed from Portsmouth to join the Standing NATO Mine Countermeasures Group 1 (SNMCMG1) as part of a deployment to the Baltic. She carried out various operations, including a search around Oslo, in which ten mines and torpedoes dating back to World War II were found. Cattistock finally returned home after four months in mid-April.

Between 2021 and 2023, Cattistock underwent a prolonged refit. She returned to sea for post-refit sea trials in September 2023. In November 2023, Cattistock deployed with the minehunter Penzance and other Royal Navy warships to patrol northern European waters with vulnerable undersea critical infrastructure in order to assist in protecting such assets.

In May 2024, the ship docked in Poole Quay ahead of being granted the Freedom of Poole.

== Affiliates ==
HMS Cattistock is affiliated with the following:

- Cattistock, Dorset
- Cattistock Hunt
- Trinity School CCF
- TS Comus - Wallsend Sea Cadets
- TS Onslow - Oldham Sea Cadets
- Lilliput Sea Scouts, Poole
