= Claire Thompson =

Claire Thompson may refer to:

- Claire Thompson (Royal Navy officer)
- Claire Thompson (author)
- Claire Thompson (ice hockey)
- Claire Thompson (Doctors)

== See also ==
- Clare Thompson, Australian tennis player
- Clare Thomson, British actor
