= Alisha Rai =

American lawyer and writer

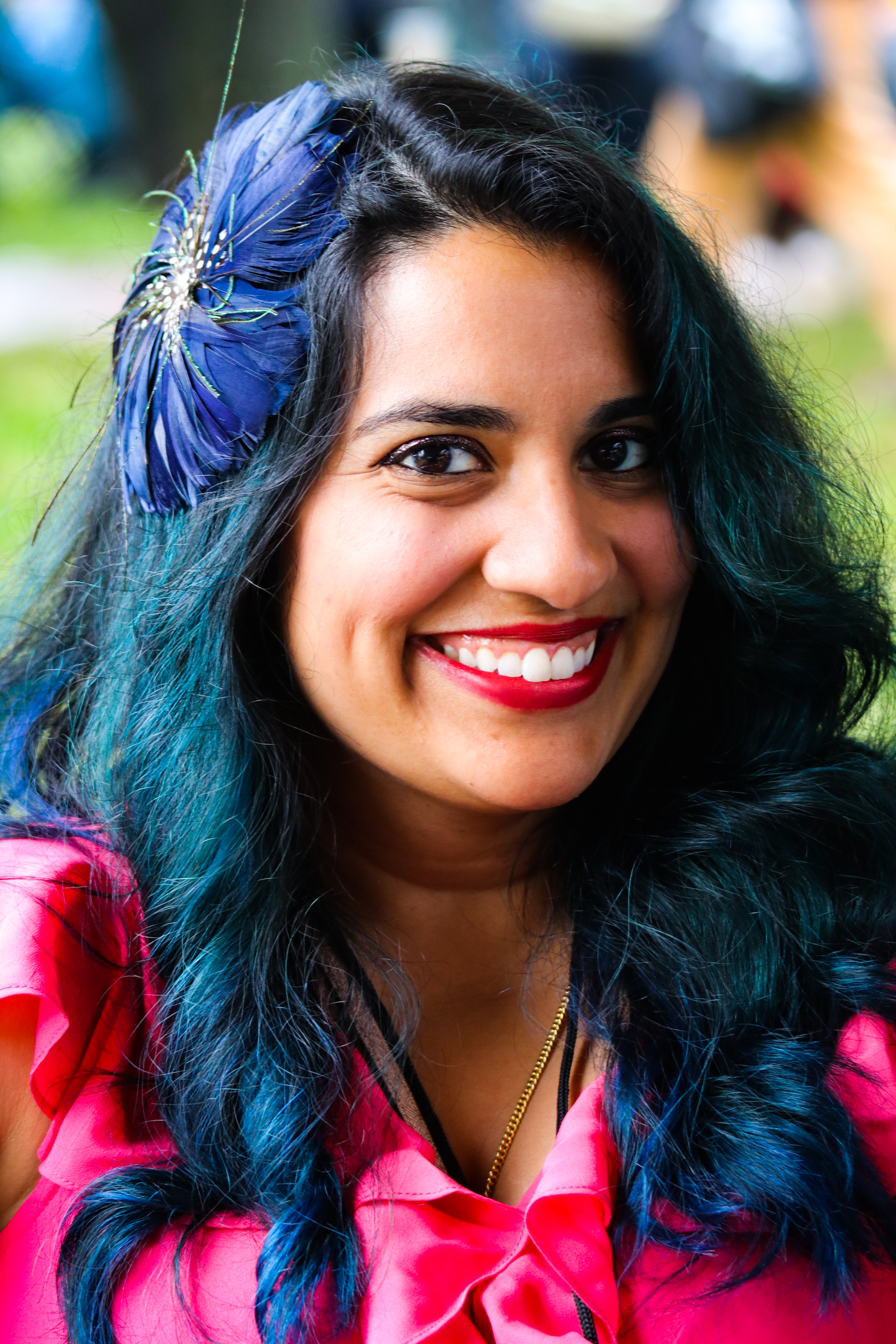
- Born: Alisha Rai
- Occupation: Novelist
- Writing career
- Genres: erotic paranormal contemporary
- Website: www.alisharai.com

Alisha Rai is an American author of contemporary, erotic, and paranormal romance novels. She advocates for greater diversity in the romance genre.

== Career ==
Prior to becoming a romance author, Rai worked as a lawyer. She began publishing her work in 2009, focusing on e-publishing. She shopped her books to traditional publishers, but she was repeatedly told that romances with non-white characters would not sell. Over her career, she expanded into different publishing methods. Her Forbidden Hearts series and her novel The Right Swipe are published through Avon Romance. Rai's book Serving Pleasure, was the first self-published book to appear on The Washington Post's annual list of best books of the year.

Rai includes protagonists from a variety of ethnicities. Her writing also explores the spectrum of sexual identity.

Rai is a vocal participant in the discussion of misrepresentation and under representation of minorities in traditionally published romance. During a racially charged dispute involving Romance Writers of America (RWA), Rai's comments on Twitter were widely quoted as a demonstration of the romance community's dissatisfaction with the organization. She was among a group of best-selling romance authors that demanded the resignation of Damon Suede, the RWA president-elect during the controversy.

Rai has been on the receiving end of online harassment.

Her first young adult novel, While You Were Dreaming, was published in 2023.

== Themes ==
Rai's book The Right Swipe explores aspects of modern dating, specifically online dating and dating apps, along with the contentious research into the effect of concussions on athletes. The book includes feminist and intersectional elements, with the heroine being a woman of color who is a CEO of a Silicon Valley company that employs a work force made up largely of women.

== Personal life ==
Rai is Asian of Indian origin.

Rai began creating stories at the age of 13.

== Bibliography ==
Title	Series	Publication year	ISBN/ASIN
Glutton for Pleasure	Pleasure Series #1	2009	B002GEDF2I
Cabin Fever		2009	9781605047539
Veiled Desire	Veiled #1	2010	9781605048918
Veiled Seduction	Veiled #2	2010	9781609280475
Never Have I Ever	Reynolds Pack #1	2010	9781609283056
Hot as Hades		2011	9781609286286
Night Whispers	ShadowLands #1	2012	9781609285449
Play With Me	Bedroom Games #1	2013	9781301991358
Risk & Reward	Bedroom Games #2	2013	9781301449187
Bet on Me	Bedroom Games #3	2014	9781311537669
A Gentleman in the Street	The Campbell Siblings #1	2014	9781514616956
Serving Pleasure	Pleasure Series #2	2015	9781518710100
Falling for Him	The Karimi Siblings #1	2015	B00WTWI44G
Falling for Her	The Karimi Siblings #2	2015	B012X78XSS
Be My Fantasy	The Fantasy Series #1	2016	9781548839314
Stay My Fantasy	The Fantasy Series #2	2016	B01H2PFGYK
Hate to Want You	Forbidden Hearts #1	2017	9780062566737
Wrong to Need You	Forbidden Hearts #2	2017	9780062566751
Hurts to Love You	Forbidden Hearts #3	2018	9780062566775
The Right Swipe	Modern Love #1	2019	9780062878090
Girl Gone Viral	Modern Love #2	2020	9780062877888
First Comes Like	Modern Love #3	2021	9780063059436
Partners in Crime		2022	9780063119468
While You Were Dreaming		2023	9780063083967
Enemies to Lovers		2026	9780063119505

== Awards ==
- 2015 - Serving Pleasure - Washington Post Best Romance Novels of 2015
- 2017 - Hate to Want You - Entertainment Weekly's 10 best romance novels of 2017
- 2019 - The Right Swipe - New York Public Library Best Books for Adults 2019
