= Dotbooks =

German e-publisher

- Founded: 2012; 14 years ago
- Founder: Beate Kuckertz
- Country of origin: Germany
- Headquarters location: Munich
- Publication types: e-books
- Official website: www.dotbooks.de

Dotbooks is a 2012 established German publisher of e-books, based in Munich, which publishes popular literature of all genres.

== History and program ==
The publisher Dotbooks was founded in February 2012 and went online in July 2012 with 37 titles. Dotbooks was one of the first German e-book publishers. Dotbooks publishes general fiction, contemporary literature, historical literature as well as fantasy, thrillers, short stories, humor books, erotic romance novels, Children's literature and young adult fiction, including educational books with general and spiritual themes. The program from Dotbooks comprised more than 300 titles in May 2013, and publishes approximately another 20 titles per month. Among the authors of Dotbooks are Sandra Henke, Jochen Till, Hera Lind and Tanja Kinkel.

== Technology and sales ==
Dotbooks supports all major formats of e-publishing, such as EPUB, Amazon Kindle and Mobipocket. Therefore, the books from Dotbooks are readable on all common readers, tablet computers and smartphones (Android, iOS).

The distribution of the e-books from Dotbooks is done online through the publisher's website or through partners such as iTunes, the Amazon Kindle Store, as well as about 100 other online bookstores.
