= Adam Sutherland =

Adam Sutherland may refer to:

- Adam Sutherland (fl. from 1999), curator, director of Grizedale Arts
- Adam Sutherland (fl. from 1998), Scots fiddler
- Adam Gerard Sutherland, a character in On Dublin Street by Samantha Young

== See also ==
- Gower Ross or Adam Gower Sutherland de Ross (1890–1917), Australian rules footballer
