= Claire Thompson (author) =

BDSM author

Claire Thompson is a BDSM author who has published over 85 novels since 1996.

== Career ==
Thompson started her writing career with Sarah's Awakening.

As a writer, Thompson explores the romance of male/female erotic submission, as well as the darker side of the BDSM experience. She has also written a collection of male homosexual BDSM erotic romances.

Thompson has been the recipient of numerous awards for her writing. She received the National Leather Association's Pauline Réage Novel Award for 2010 for Submission Times Two as well as the Golden Flogger Award (2017) for best BDSM Dark Erotica. She is a prolific writer, currently (2012) writing four novels per year.

Previously she has published with Ellora's Cave, Samhain Publishing, Black Lace Series, and others. She created her own imprint, Romance Unbound Publishing, in 2009.

== Novels ==
This is a partial list of novels.

- 2009 Texas Surrender. Published by Romance Unbound Publishing. November 10, 2009.
- 2009 Accidental Slave. Booksurge Publishing. February 11, 2009.
- 2010 Cowboy Poet. Published by Romance Unbound Publishing. November 5, 2010.
- 2011 Enslaved. October 12, 2011.
- 2012 The Auction. Romance Unbound Publishing. October 19, 2012.
- 2012 Jewel Thief. Romance Unbound Publishing. November 1, 2012.
- 2014 The Inner Room. Romance Unbound Publishing. June 20, 2014.
- 2015 Handyman. Romance Unbound Publishing. November 3, 2015.
- 2016 No Safeword. CreateSpace. January 15, 2016.

== Personal life ==
Thompson has two children, a son and a daughter. Thompson is a submissive. Thompson lives in New York (state).
