= HMS Queen Elizabeth March =

20212 music to honour RN aircraft carriers

HMS Queen Elizabeth March, composed by WO2 bandmaster John Morrish RM, was the winning composition for the 2012 Royal Marines Band Service March Competition, sponsored by the Aircraft Carrier Alliance. The march was written for the first of the new generation of Royal Navy Queen Elizabeth-class aircraft carriers.

HMS Queen Elizabeth March is a lively march, with many references to nautical themes. The opening fanfare captures the size and magnificence of the aircraft carrier with the main theme having references to the March Past of the Royal Navy, Heart of Oak. The trio pays homage to the 20th-century battleship HMS Queen Elizabeth, the only other ship to hold this name, by trying to recreate the old style Royal Navy ship’s siren. This is then followed by a grandioso featuring the trio theme, a sea shanty effect from the woodwind, and a trombone counter melody, with a hint of Rule, Britannia!

HMS Queen Elizabeth March premiered at the Deal Memorial Bandstand concert in 2012, at the launching ceremony of the supercarrier HMS Queen Elizabeth and has been performed at the Royal Albert Hall and Horse Guards Parade ground by the massed bands of Her Majesty’s Royal Marines.
