= Beautiful Bastard =

2013 novel by Christina Lauren

- Cover for the 2013 first edition
- Author: Christina Lauren
- Genre: Erotic romance
- Publisher: Simon & Schuster
- English publication date: February 12, 2013
- Pages: 320 pgs
- ISBN: 1476730091
- Followed by: Beautiful Stranger

Beautiful Bastard is a 2013 erotic romance novel by Christina Hobbs and Lauren Billings under the singular pen name of Christina Lauren. The book was originally published online as a Twilight fan fiction entitled The Office, with Simon & Schuster purchasing the publishing rights to the series.

The book was followed by four sequels (Beautiful Stranger, Beautiful Player, Beautiful Secret, and Beautiful), as well as five novellas (Beautiful Bitch, Beautiful Bombshell, Beautiful Beginning, Beautiful Beloved, and Beautiful Boss). Every book in the series debuted on the New York Times Bestseller list.

== Plot ==
Beautiful Bastard is a romantic comedy that follows Chloe Mills, a hardworking intern and MBA student that works underneath her demanding yet attractive boss Bennett Ryan. The two are constantly at odds with each other, a tense relationship that begins the first time the two meet. Bennett is drawn to Chloe, but acts terse towards her. She is independent and strong-willed and the first person to really stand up to him. Their relationship comes to a head one night when the two stay late for an impromptu practice speech on an account she is working on. The speech quickly turns into a sexual encounter, the first of many the pair has within the office building. Despite vows from each of them that the affair will not continue, Bennett and Chloe keep running into each other in places such as a La Perla lingerie store. Chloe is concerned over the nature of the relationship, afraid that it will jeopardize her future career if her sexual relationship with Bennett gets out. Meanwhile, Bennett finds himself growing more possessive of Chloe, especially after his mother attempts to fix her up with Joel Cignoli, a family friend. The relationship finally comes to a head when Chloe has to leave to care for her father after he discovers a tumor in his stomach, which prompts Bennett to realize that his feelings for Chloe are more than sexual and that he can't fully operate without her. When she returns the two go to a convention in San Diego, where they continue their affair. After Bennett is forced to remain behind in the hotel room due to food poisoning, Chloe is left to handle an important presentation with a client, which she aces. Her emotional high from the last few days is shattered, however, when she overhears Bennett supposedly taking the credit for her successful presentation. This prompts her to break up with Bennett and submit her resignation from the company, which devastates Bennett. Chloe manages to gain another job at a different corporation for her student project, but at the official presentation to the school board she is met by Bennett, who confesses his love for her. She then presents two portfolios for her student project, much to the delight of the school board. The book ends with Chloe and Bennett reconciling and resuming their relationship.

== Development ==
Hobbs originally began working on the story in 2009 under the title of The Office. The Office was well received online but was removed by Hobbs due to her perceiving the story's popularity as "a bit overwhelming". Hobbs began writing with Billings in 2010 and after noticing the story's rise in popularity after the publishing of Fifty Shades of Grey, decided to re-write and publish the story as Beautiful Bastard. Hobbs and Billings have stated that they have extensively re-worked the story line of The Office, claiming that only 20% of the original book remains in Beautiful Bastard.

The Office has been credited by a University of Utah professor as "[paving] the way for 'Fifty Shades' and a thousand other imitators. It turned fanfiction's 'porn without plot' into 'porn as plot'".

== Film adaptation ==
On February 11, 2013, it was announced that Constantin Film had acquired the rights to Beautiful Bastard with the intention of turning it into a feature film. Jeremy Bolt was confirmed as producer. In 2016 the rights reverted to the authors. On May 4, 2018 Christina Lauren were interviewed about the adaptation of their novel Roomies, and mentioned they were also working on a TV pilot for the series.In February 2026, Fifth Season acquired the rights to adapt the book into a TV series. Christina Hobbs and Lauren Billings will co-write the series, with Bill Dubuque supervising and producing.

== Reception ==
Beautiful Bastard was a finalist for Best Romance of 2013 at the Goodreads Choice Awards.

RT Book Reviews gave Beautiful Bastard three stars, saying that while the book "is filled with plenty of hot sex and sizzling tension between boss Bennett and employee Chloe", the alternating viewpoints "proves distracting rather than providing depth" and that "the level at which this couple loathes each other for the majority of the story makes the hasty resolution hard to believe".

The #1 internationally bestselling series is currently translated in more than thirty languages.
