= Shipborne rolling vertical landing =

Method of aircraft landing

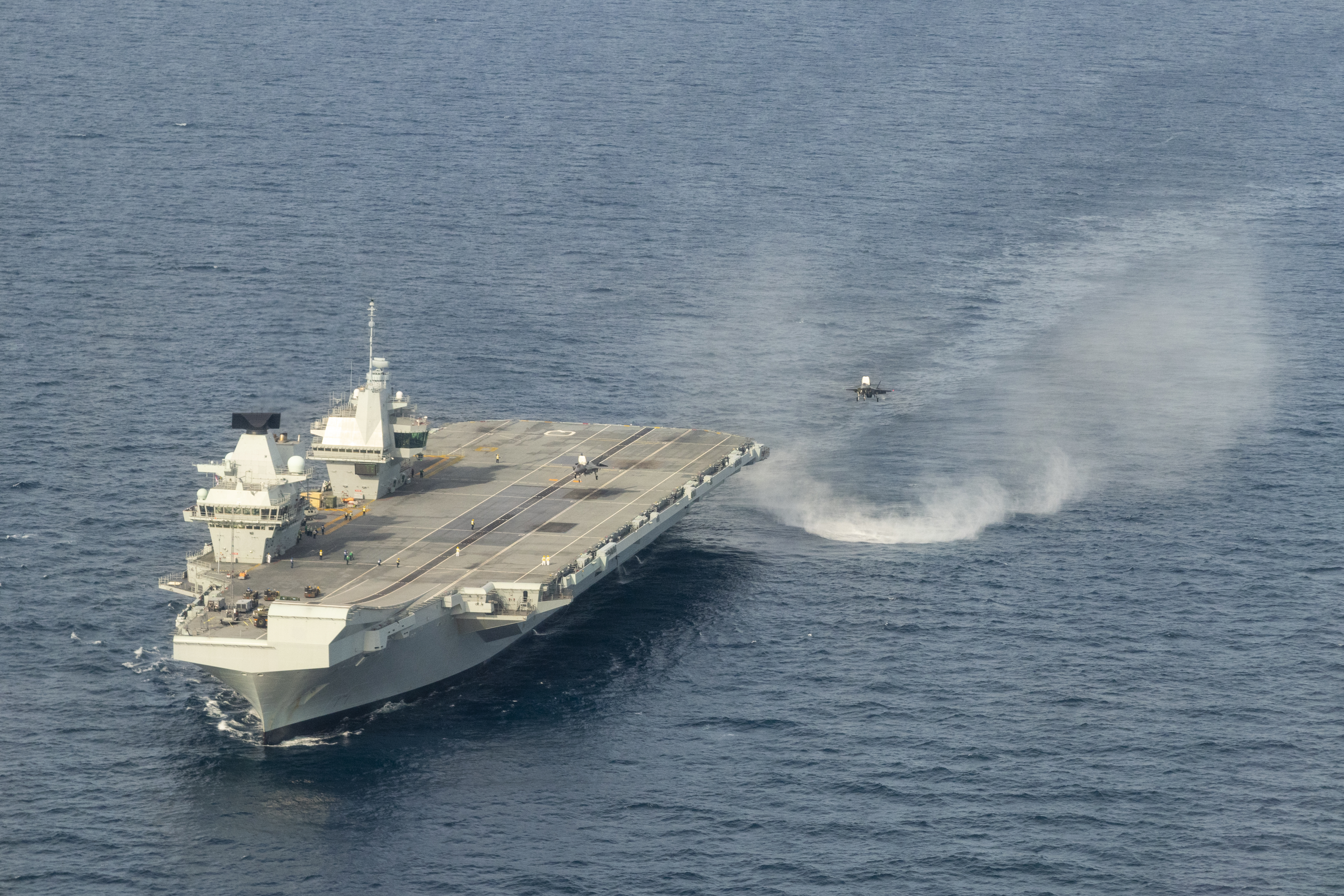
Two F-35B Lightning II aircraft landing onboard the HMS Queen Elizabeth in 2018

Shipborne rolling vertical landing (SRVL) is a method used to land a V/STOL aircraft that uses both the vertical thrust from the jet engine and lift from the wings as opposed to one or the other.

A V/STOL aircraft typically (not using SRVL) must either land vertically or make a conventional runway landing. For a vertical landing it uses downward thrust from the lift fan and/or rotated jet nozzle(s), while for a runway landing the jet nozzle(s) are pointed rearward. With a rolling vertical landing the aircraft uses downward jet thrust to hover while it is still moving fast enough to also generate wing lift. This allows for a rolling landing with a significantly reduced approach speed and landing distance, requirements not necessary on Catapult-assisted take-off barrier-arrested recovery (CATOBAR) carriers.

With an SRVL manoeuvre, a V/STOL aircraft can make a rolling landing on an aircraft carrier and come to an effective stop with the disc brakes in the landing gear. Unlike a rolling landing on a CATOBAR carrier, this does not require the use of an arrestor wire and tailhook. The operational advantage of this technique is that it can increase the landing payload capacity of a V/STOL aircraft, which can be restricted when it lands vertically. For vertical landing, Harriers need to dump unused fuel and unused munitions to drop below the permissible payload capacity for safe landing.

The SRVL manoeuvre can also reduce the level of wear on the lift engines and extend their operational life. Similarly, it can reduce the amount of wear upon the deck surface of a carrier caused by the downward jet exhaust from vertical landings.

== History ==
=== Harrier ===
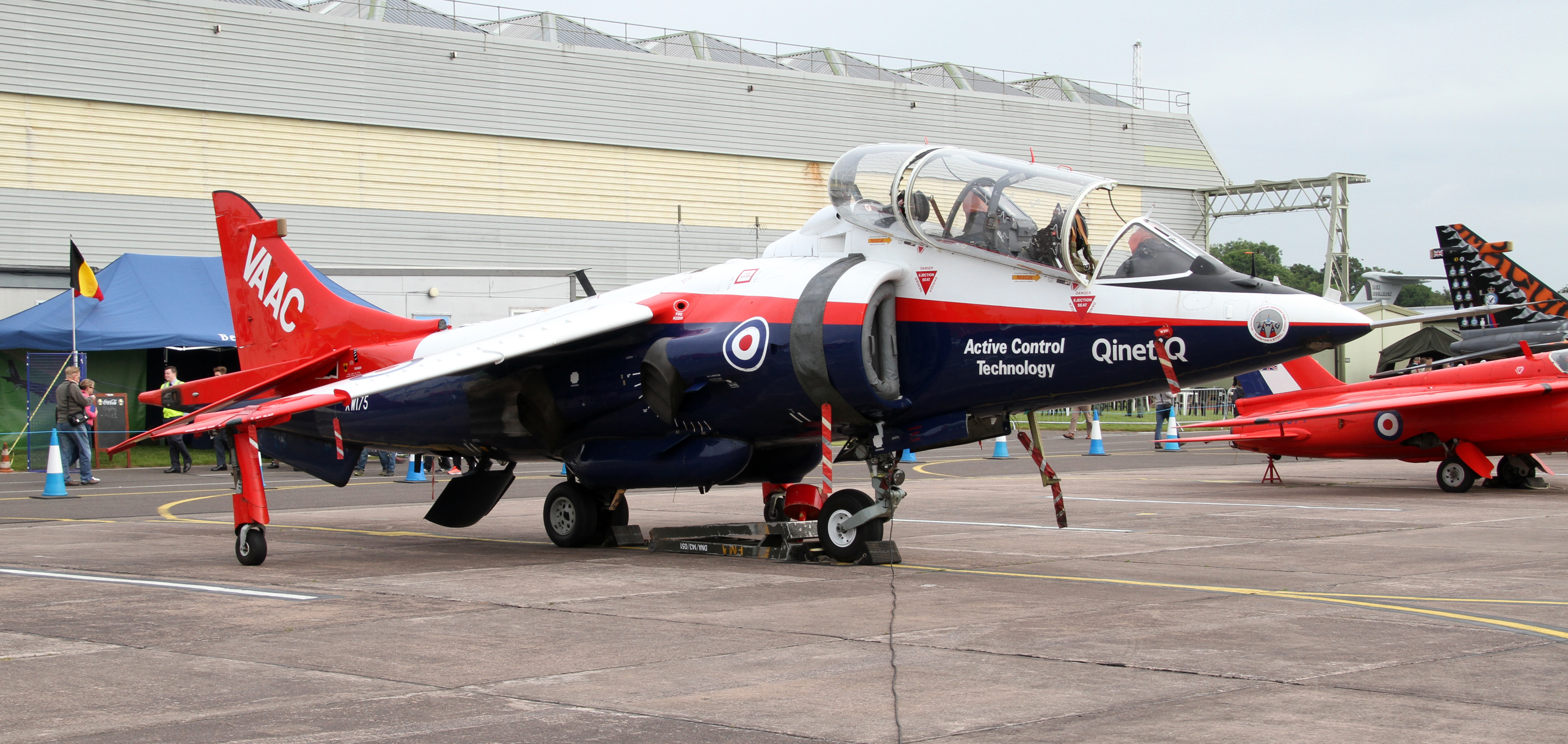
VAAC Harrier

An SRVL development program was undertaken with by UK defence manufacturer QinetiQ for the planned JSF. In 2007 the company used the Vectored-thrust Aircraft Advanced Control (VAAC) Hawker Siddeley Harrier test aircraft to demonstrate the feasibility of the landing technique on the French Navy carrier Charles de Gaulle. A series of landing approach trials were also flown with the Royal Navy carrier HMS Illustrious in 2008. The carrier was fitted with a visual landing aid called a “Bedford Array”, which provides glidepath information to the pilot through a helmet-mounted display.

=== Osprey ===
In October 2015, the US Navy's Naval Air Systems Command (NAVAIR) tested rolling landings and takeoffs with the Bell Boeing V-22 Osprey tiltrotor on a carrier, preparing for carrier onboard delivery.

=== F-35B Lightning II ===
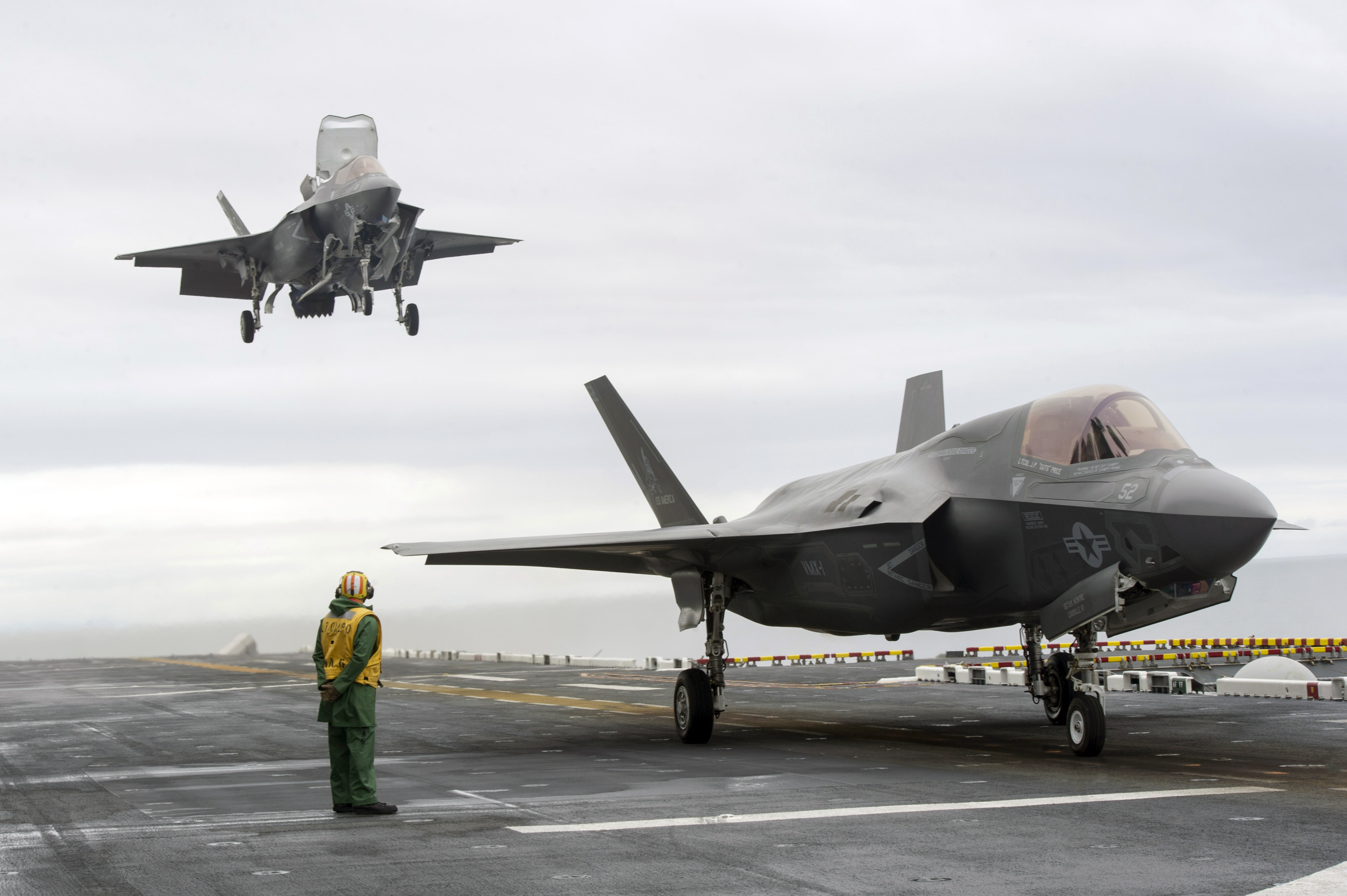
The F-35B will use SRVL landings with the Royal Navy

SRVL landing is under development for use with the Lockheed Martin F-35B Lightning II. The aircraft will operate in the STOVL mode on the first of the new Queen Elizabeth-class aircraft carriers. Rolling landings will enable the F-35B to land on these carriers with an increased weapon and fuel load and will use the aircraft's computer controlled disc brakes. On the weekend of 13/14 October 2018, the Royal Navy announced that British test pilot Peter Wilson made history when he conducted the first-ever shipborne rolling vertical landing (SRVL) with a F-35 Lightning in test aircraft BF-04 onto HMS Queen Elizabeth. Her sister ship, HMS Prince of Wales, is equipped with the full 'Bedford Array' Visual Landing Aid system. By taking inputs from inertial references to stabilise against deck motions, combined with a ship-referenced velocity vector in a helmet-mounted display, a pilot can fly an accurate approach to the deck on a constant glidepath.

In 2025, the Defence Annual Report and Accounts 2024 to 2025 suggested that the SRVL upgrade for the F-35B would be cancelled, saving £309,000. It was later clarified that SRVL upgrades for HMS Queen Elizabeth were being delayed from 2025 until a future budget year, pending analysis of SRVL trials on HMS Prince of Wales by a commercial partner.
