= HMS Queen Elizabeth (R08) =

2017 Queen Elizabeth-class aircraft carrier of the Royal Navy

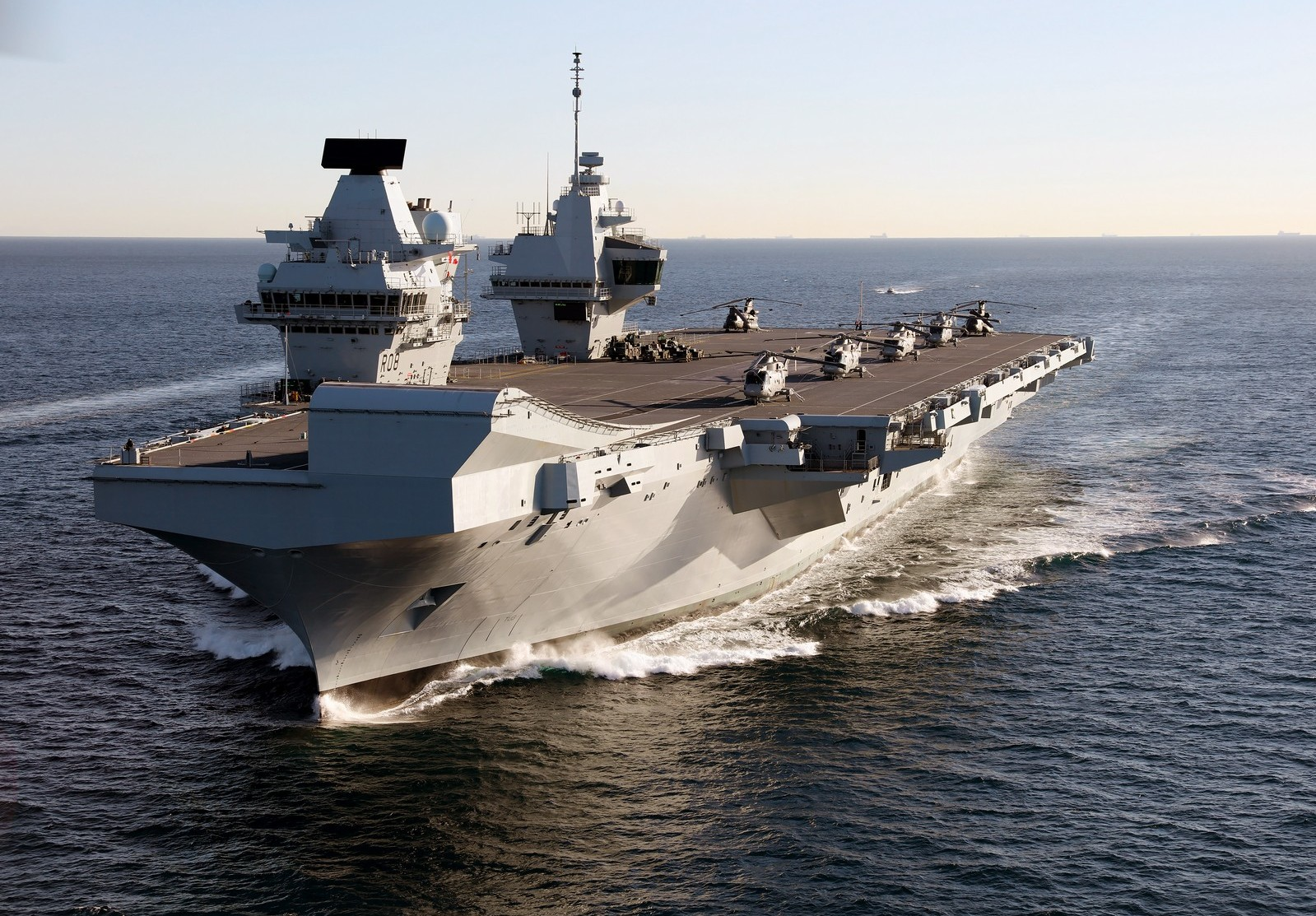
- HMS Queen Elizabeth, February 2018

History

United Kingdom
- Name: Queen Elizabeth
- Namesake: Elizabeth I
- Operator: Royal Navy
- Ordered: 20 May 2008
- Builder: Aircraft Carrier Alliance at Rosyth Dockyard
- Cost: Programme cost: £6.1 billion; Unit cost: £3 billion (Note: As of November 2013 the official project cost for the two carriers is £6.2bn.)
- Laid down: 7 July 2009
- Launched: 17 July 2014
- Sponsored by: Elizabeth II; Charles III
- Christened: 4 July 2014
- Commissioned: 7 December 2017
- In service: 2020
- Home port: HMNB Portsmouth
- Identification: Pennant number: R08; IMO number: 4907892; International call sign: GQLZ; Deck code: Q; BFPO Number: 365; BFPO Postcode: BF1 4LG
- Motto: Semper Eadem ("Always the Same")
- Honours and awards: Dardanelles 1915–16; Crete 1941; Sabang 1944; Burma 1944–45 (Note: These honours were won by the ship's predecessor.)
- Status: In active service
- Badge

General characteristics
- Class & type: Queen Elizabeth-class aircraft carrier
- Type: Supercarrier
- Displacement: Est. 80,600 tonnes (79,300 long tons) full load
- Length: 284 m (932 ft)
- Beam: 39 m (128 ft) (waterline) 73 m (240 ft) overall
- Draught: 11 m (36 ft)
- Decks: 9 decks below the flight deck
- Propulsion: GE Integrated electric propulsion powered by two Rolls-Royce Marine 36 MW MT30 gas turbine alternators and four 10 MW diesel engines
- Speed: 25 knots (46 km/h; 29 mph), tested to 32 knots (59 km/h; 37 mph)
- Range: 10,000 nautical miles (19,000 km)
- Boats & landing craft carried: up to 3 x (36-man) ALN-139-class passenger transport boats; 2 x Pacific 24 RHIBs
- Capacity: 1,600
- Troops: 250
- Complement: 679
- Sensors & processing systems: S1850M long range radar; Type 997 Artisan 3D medium range radar; Ultra Electronics Series 2500 Electro Optical System (EOS)
- Armament: 3 × Phalanx CIWS; 4 × 30mm DS30M Mk2 guns (for but not with); 6 × Miniguns (retired in 2023 and replaced by 0.5-inch (12.7mm) Browning heavy machine guns)
- Aircraft carried: Planned carrier air wing of up to 24 to 36 F-35B Lightning IIs plus helicopters (65+ aircraft/helicopters may be carried at surge capacity); F-35B Lightning II; Chinook; Apache AH MK1; AH-64E Apache Guardian; Merlin HM2 and HC4; Wildcat AH1 and HMA2; Merlin Crowsnest AEW
- Aviation facilities: Hangar below deck; Two aircraft lifts; Refuelling and re-arming facilities; Ski jump

HMS Queen Elizabeth is the lead ship of the Queen Elizabeth class of aircraft carriers built for the Royal Navy. Capable of carrying 60 aircraft including fixed wing, rotary wing and autonomous vehicles, she is named in honour of the first HMS Queen Elizabeth, a World War I era super-dreadnought, which in turn was named after Queen Elizabeth I. The carrier Queen Elizabeth carries her namesake ship's honours, as well as her Tudor rose-adorned crest and motto.

Queen Elizabeth commenced her sea trials in June 2017, was commissioned on 7 December 2017 and entered service in 2020. Her first seagoing commanding officer was Commodore Jerry Kyd who was appointed in 2014 but did not take command until May 2016, having previously commanded the carriers Ark Royal and Illustrious. As of 2026, her commander is Claire Thompson.

The ship is designed to operate V/STOL aircraft. The air wing will typically consist of F-35B Lightning II multirole fighters and Merlin helicopters for airborne early warning and anti-submarine warfare. The design emphasises flexibility, with accommodation for 250 Royal Marines and the ability to support them with attack helicopters and large troop transports such as Chinooks. She is based at HMNB Portsmouth.

Queen Elizabeth will deploy as the central part of a UK Carrier Strike Group with escorts and support ships in order to deliver carrier-enabled power projection.

== Design and construction ==
On 25 July 2007 Defence Secretary Des Browne announced the order for two new carriers. At the time of approval the first carrier was expected to enter service in July 2015 and the budget was £4.085 billion for two ships. The financial crisis led to a political decision in December 2008 to slow production, delaying Queen Elizabeth until May 2016. This added £1.56 billion to the cost. By March 2010 the budget was estimated at £5.9 billion and in November 2013 the contract was renegotiated with a budget of £6.2 billion. The in-service date was further extended to 2020 in the Strategic Defence and Security Review in October 2010.

Construction of Queen Elizabeth began in 2009. The assembly took place in the Firth of Forth at Rosyth Dockyard from nine blocks built in six UK shipyards: BAE Systems Surface Ships in Glasgow, Babcock at Appledore, Babcock at Rosyth, A&P Tyne in Hebburn, BAE at Portsmouth and Cammell Laird (flight decks) at Birkenhead. Two of the lower main blocks, together weighing more than 6,000 tonnes and forming part of the base of the ship, were assembled and joined into one piece on 30 June 2011.

On 16 August 2011, the 8,000-tonne Lower Block 03 of Queen Elizabeth left BAE Systems Surface Ships' Govan shipyard in Glasgow on a large ocean-going barge. After travelling 600 miles (970 km) around the northern coast of Scotland, the block arrived at Rosyth on the evening of 20 August 2011.

On 28 October 2012, an 11,000-tonne section of the carrier began a lengthy journey around the south coast of England, avoiding bad weather, from the shipbuilding hall at Govan to the Rosyth dockyard; it arrived on 21 November. The forward island was constructed at BAE Portsmouth and attached on 14 March 2013; the aft island was attached in June 2013. The ski jump was added in November 2013, leaving just the lifts and radar to be lifted into place. By September 2013 Queen Elizabeth was 80% complete internally.

The carrier is three times the size of the Invincible-class, and has the ability to carry approximately three times as many aircraft. Despite this, Queen Elizabeth has marginally fewer crew than the Invincible-class. The ship has two superstructures, or islands, one for navigation and ship's operations and the other for flight control and aerial operations. The islands can take on each other's function if one is incapacitated.

=== Naming ceremony ===
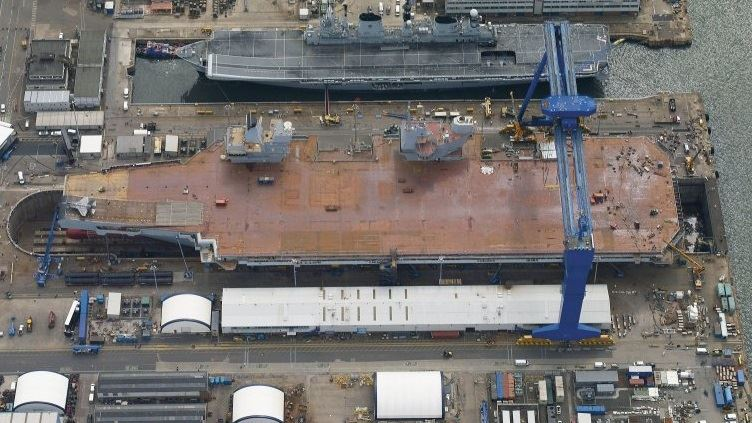
Queen Elizabeth alongside Illustrious on the day of her naming ceremony

Queen Elizabeth was christened at Rosyth on 4 July 2014, by Queen Elizabeth II, who said that the warship "marks a new phase in our naval history". Instead of smashing the traditional bottle of champagne on the hull, she used a bottle of whisky from the Bowmore distillery on Islay.

The ceremony was attended by Prince Philip, Duke of Edinburgh (the Lord High Admiral), Admiral George Zambellas (First Sea Lord), senior naval officers from the United States and France, and by politicians including David Cameron and Gordon Brown (the Prime Minister and his immediate predecessor) and Alex Salmond (the First Minister of Scotland). The official piece of music HMS Queen Elizabeth March, composed by WO2 Bandmaster John Morrish, was performed at the naming ceremony by the Band of HM Royal Marines Scotland. This piece of music is a competition-winning march chosen by the Carrier Alliance Group, performed and recorded by the Royal Marines Massed Bands.

The ceremony also featured a fly-past by the Red Arrows and a second comprising Royal Navy, Royal Air Force and British Army helicopters. HMS Illustrious was berthed adjacent to Queen Elizabeth during the ceremony.

The ship was floated out of dry dock on the morning of 17 July 2014. Fitting out was completed at the end of 2015 and the crew moved aboard in May 2016.

=== Sea trials ===
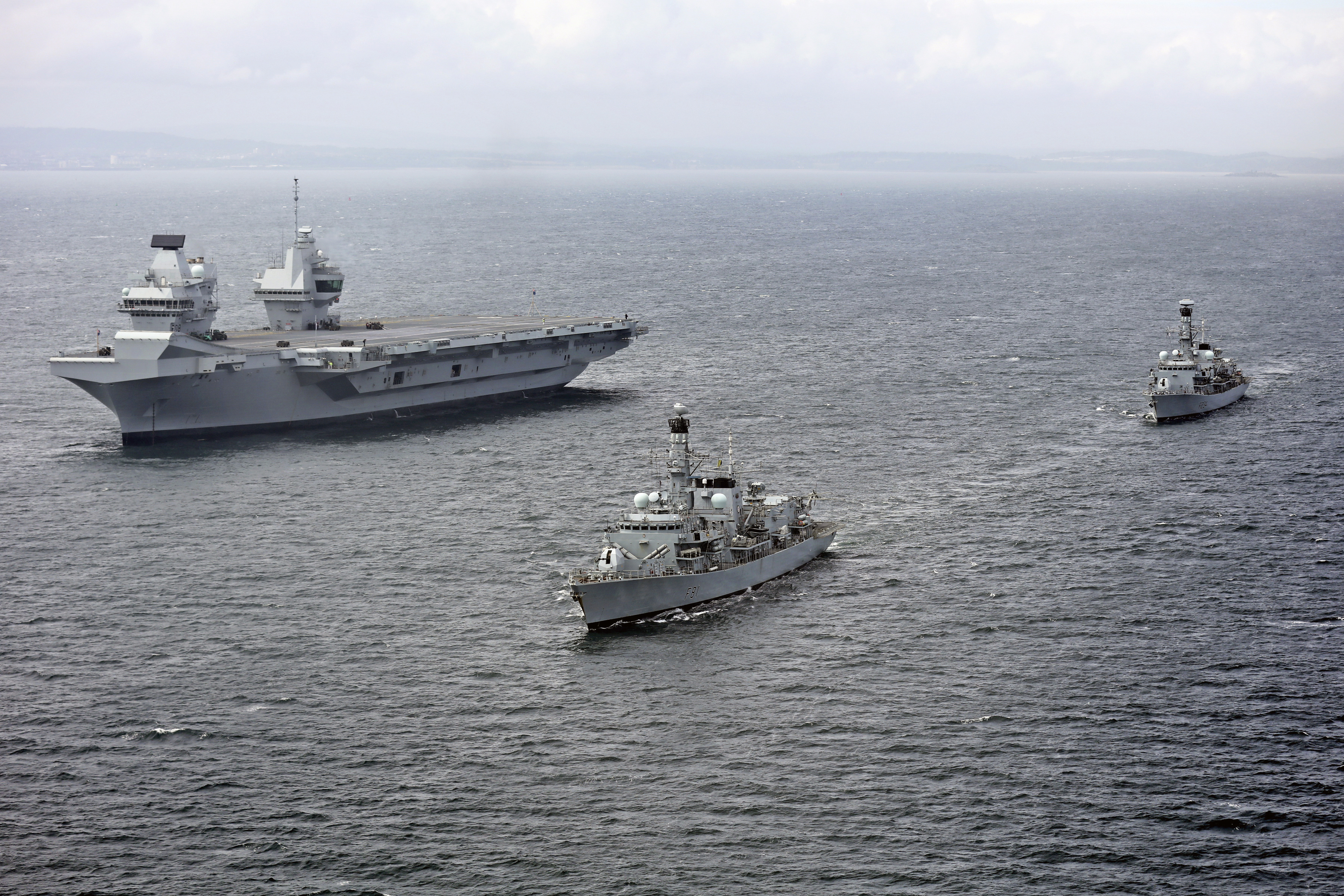
Queen Elizabeth at sea on 28 June, two days after her departure from Rosyth, in company with frigates Sutherland (foreground) and Iron Duke (background)

Sea trials were planned beginning in March 2017 with delivery expected in May 2017, but technical issues delayed her trials. Prior to her departure from Rosyth, an extensive survey was carried out of the Firth of Forth by Gleaner and 42 Regiment, Royal Engineers to gather information on the tides, the depth of the river bed, and the height of the three river crossings (Forth Bridge, Forth Road Bridge, and Queensferry Crossing). This was necessary as the most recent data available were 60 years old.

Queen Elizabeth sailed on 26 June 2017 to undergo sea trials. The first stage of the operation was to move the ship from inside the fitting out basin, via one of the access gates, into the Firth of Forth itself, before taking her under the three Forth bridge crossings. Once this was accomplished, the ship took to the open sea off the east coast of Scotland to undertake the first set of trials, including handling and speed tests. During this period, Queen Elizabeth was accompanied by a pair of Type 23 frigates, Sutherland and Iron Duke, acting as escorts. The first aircraft to land on the ship was a Merlin HM.2 helicopter of 820 Naval Air Squadron on 3 July. Queen Elizabeth arrived at her first stopover at Invergordon, where the ship was fuelled and provisioned. At this point inspections of the hull were carried out. This opportunity allowed defect rectification to be carried out prior to the ship returning to sea.

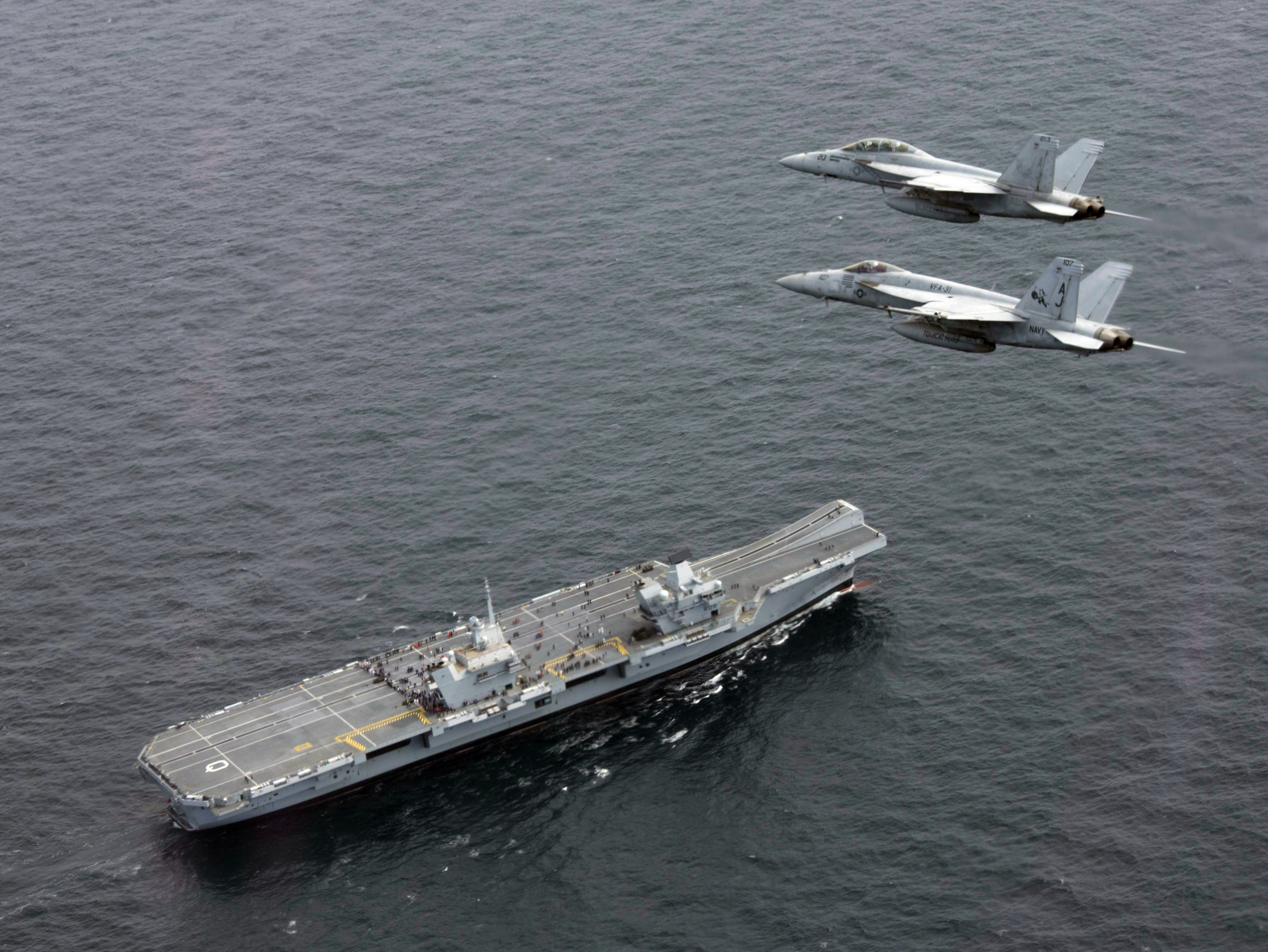
A pair of Super Hornets from USS George H.W. Bush overfly Queen Elizabeth during Exercise Saxon Warrior in 2017.

On 8 August 2017, Queen Elizabeth diverted from her sea trials to rendezvous with the ships engaged in Exercise 'Saxon Warrior'; this allowed for a photo exercise in company with the American Nimitz-class aircraft carrier USS George H.W. Bush and her Carrier Strike Group (CSG), comprising USS Donald Cook, USS Philippine Sea, HMS Iron Duke, HMS Westminster and HNoMS Helge Ingstad.

Queen Elizabeth was scheduled to return to Rosyth at the end of July for rectification work based on the results of the ship's first sea trials, before putting to sea for a second time to undergo a series of mission system tests, prior to being handed over to the Royal Navy. This plan was abandoned and she instead steered for her home port, Portsmouth.

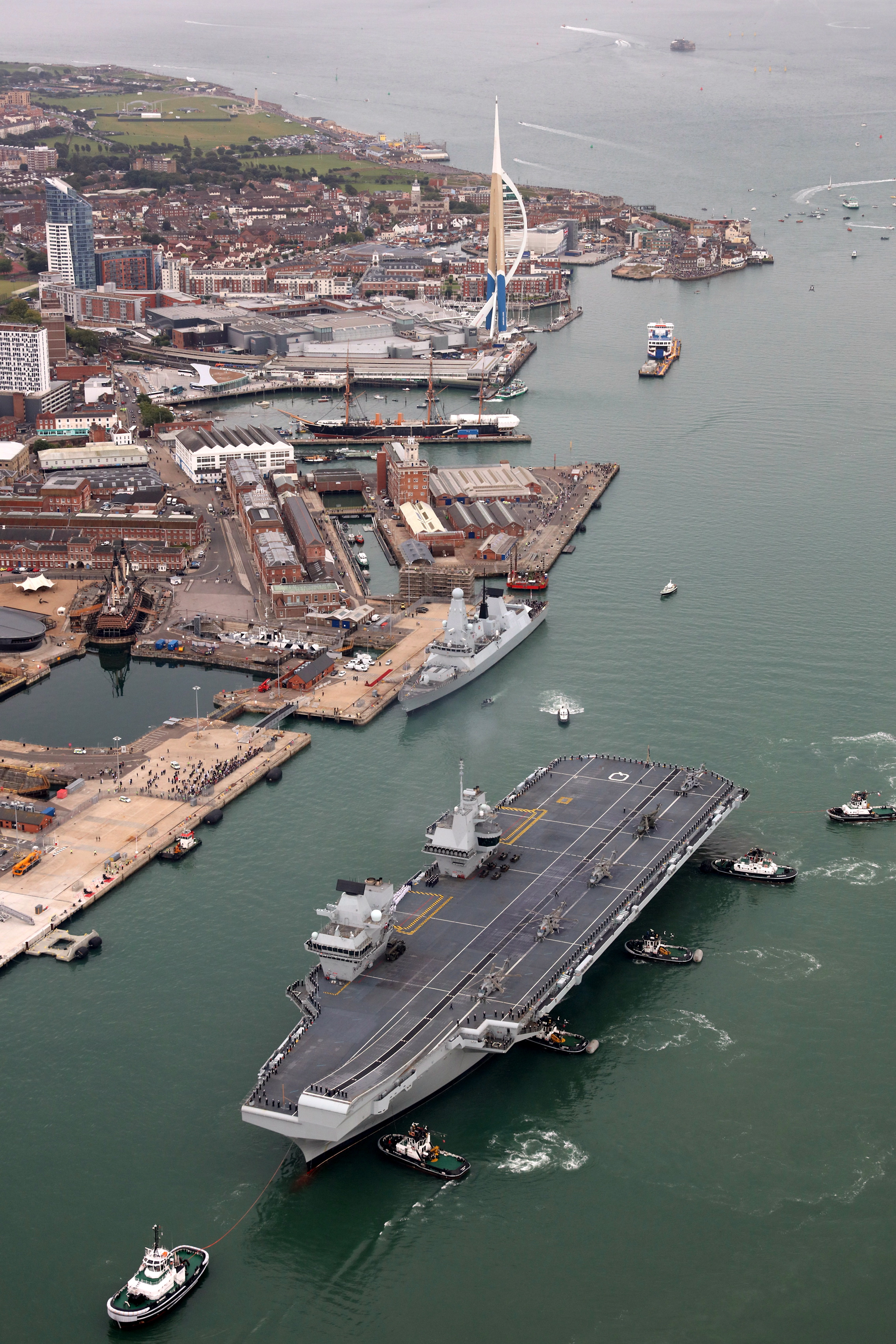
HMS Queen Elizabeth sailing into her home port of Portsmouth for the first time

Queen Elizabeth arrived at HMNB Portsmouth for the first time on 16 August 2017 and berthed at the newly renamed Princess Royal Jetty (formerly Middle Slip Jetty).

On 30 October 2017, the ship departed Portsmouth for the first time for the second phase of her sea trials off the south and south-west coasts of England. For part of this second period of sea trials, she was accompanied by the Type 45 destroyer Dragon. Queen Elizabeth returned to Portsmouth on 21 November 2017 to prepare for her official commissioning ceremony, which was held on 7 December 2017. Following the ship's commissioning, she underwent a period of defect correction in Portsmouth; one instance was a leak through a seal in one of the propeller shafts, which the Royal Navy stated was not serious enough to keep Queen Elizabeth from her planned programme.

== Operational history ==
On 2 February 2018, Queen Elizabeth sailed from Portsmouth for a second time, for a six-week deployment to undergo the first phases of operational training; initially, the ship was scheduled to head into the Western Approaches to undertake her initial Operational Sea Training (OST) programme. Once complete, Queen Elizabeth was then taken into the North Atlantic for both heavy weather testing and operations to begin helicopter certification, including with Merlin Mk2 and Mk3 and Chinook helicopters. During this deployment, the ship made her first overseas port visit, stopping over in Gibraltar from 9 to 12 February. During this, the ship also began initial amphibious assault trials, with Royal Marines from 42 Commando embarked to simulate an air assault scenario. Queen Elizabeth was also scheduled to undergo a first replenishment at sea from RFA Tidespring; although the actual replenishment had to be abandoned due to bad weather, the rendezvous allowed both ships the opportunity to simulate the scenario in detail. Queen Elizabeth returned to Portsmouth on 27 February 2018, berthing at Princess Royal Jetty. On 2 March 2018 in Portsmouth Harbour, Queen Elizabeth successfully tested her port side Marine Evacuation System (MES), a series of bright orange inflatable escape chutes and rafts.

Queen Elizabeth departed Portsmouth for a third time on 10 June 2018, heading to the coasts of Cornwall for a second phase of helicopter flight trials. After the trials were completed, Queen Elizabeth headed for home and performed her first replenishment at sea (RAS) refuelling operation with Tidespring on 21 June 2018 in the English Channel, then returned to Portsmouth on 23 June 2018. On return from the initial OST and helicopter certification work, further work was undertaken to prepare the ship for the operation of fixed-wing aircraft, in conjunction with regular maintenance and installation of her final weapons fit.

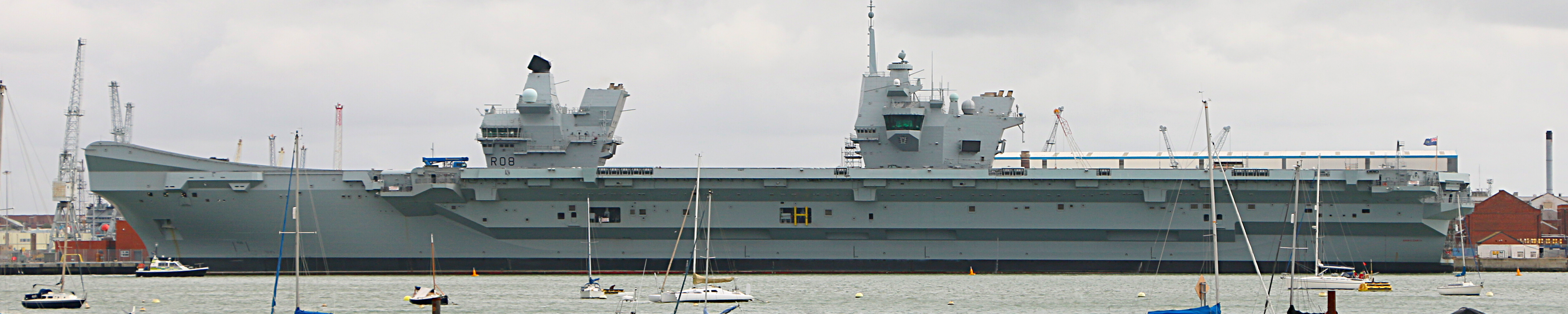
Queen Elizabeth in Portsmouth, September 2017

=== 2018: Westlant 18 ===
Queen Elizabeth's first significant deployment took place during autumn 2018, when the ship travelled across the Atlantic to begin flying trials with her fixed-wing aircraft. Although the programme covered a range of areas, including the continued workup of the Commander UK Carrier Strike Group and his staff, embarked for a deployment for the first time, and small-scale exercises to test the ship's ability to land troops in the secondary amphibious role, the primary purpose was the first phase of fixed-wing flying trials involving the F-35B over two separate periods of approximately 3–4 weeks each starting in mid-September, utilising a pair of the instrumented development aircraft from VX-23, the US Navy's air testing unit at NAS Patuxent River. The testing programme saw the first launch of an F-35 from a ski-jump at sea (the F-35B has operated from the US Navy's assault ships, but these are not fitted with ski-jumps), and the first demonstration of the shipborne rolling vertical landing technique.

In addition to the F-35 trials, Queen Elizabeth also began qualifications for types of aircraft operated by the US armed forces, including the V-22 Osprey. As part of the deployment, the ship made her first overseas port visit to New York City in October, in between layovers at Naval Station Norfolk, some operations in the Caribbean possible, to test the ship's hot weather performance, as well as being on hand if needed for any disaster relief operations during the hurricane season. Queen Elizabeth was scheduled to return to the UK in December.

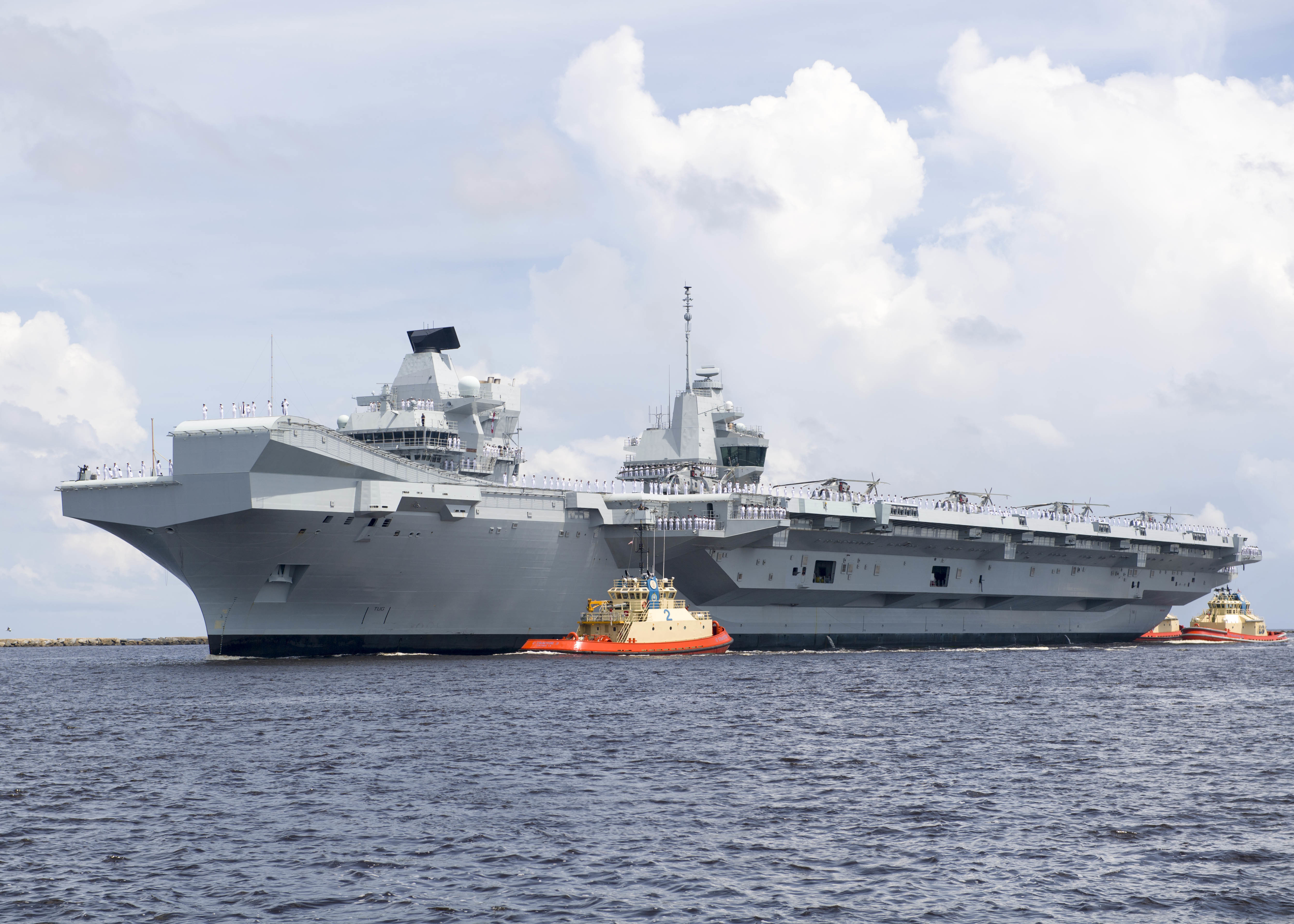
Queen Elizabeth arriving at Mayport following her Atlantic crossing

On 18 August 2018, Queen Elizabeth sailed from Portsmouth on what was termed as "Westlant 18", carrying three Merlin Mk2 helicopters of 820 NAS. Later, on 20 August 2018, three additional Merlin Mk4 helicopters from 845 NAS were embarked to the ship. Queen Elizabeth was then met by HMS Monmouth to form a carrier group. On 3 September 2018, Monmouth's Wildcat HMA2 helicopter became the first of its type to land aboard Queen Elizabeth. On 5 September 2018, the two ships arrived at Naval Station Mayport in north-east Florida, for a period of replenishment. The ships remained in Florida for eight days before departing for the planned trip northwards to US Naval Station Norfolk.

During the transit north, she was to undertake an amphibious assault exercise off the coast of South Carolina using its Merlin Mk4 helicopters and Royal Marines of 42 Commando. However, due to the effects of Hurricane Florence, this exercise was cancelled and the group instead sailed south; Monmouth headed to waters off The Bahamas, which acted as a windbreak, while Queen Elizabeth skirted around the south of the hurricane zone. The group eventually arrived at Norfolk on 17 September. During the period alongside at Norfolk, Queen Elizabeth embarked a further 200 personnel of the F-35B Integrated Test Force, to undertake the testing and analysis of the two F-35B aircraft to be used during the initial set of flying trials.

On 25 September 2018, two US-owned F-35B test aircraft, based at Naval Air Station Patuxent River, flew out to meet Queen Elizabeth off the New Jersey coast. After refuelling, Commander Gray then achieved the first F-35B take off from Queen Elizabeth using the ski-jump ramp. During the initial F-35B trials, Queen Elizabeth also began trials for the UK Carrier Group staff when the ship, along with Monmouth, formed a task group with the US Navy destroyer USS Lassen and USNS Supply, a fast combat support ship, which performed RAS with Queen Elizabeth and Monmouth on 1 October 2018. During October, the first instances of cross-decking took place when a US Navy MH-53E Sea Dragon helicopter, and a US Marine Corps tiltrotor MV-22B Osprey landed on board. The first shipborne rolling vertical landing (SRVL) by an F-35 was undertaken on 14 October – this was also the first operational demonstration of the technique on a ship at sea, and is planned as the primary method of recovering fixed-wing aircraft aboard the Queen Elizabeth class.

On 19 October 2018, Queen Elizabeth arrived in New York City for a planned seven day visit. Kyd remarked "we are the biggest carrier to go in there for about 50 years", as the U.S. Navy's nuclear-powered aircraft carriers are forbidden from making a port of call in New York City. She dropped anchor near Ellis and Liberty Islands in Upper New York Bay. During the ship's stopover, she played host to a forum hosted by Gavin Williamson, the UK Secretary of State for Defence, on the future of cyber security, as well as an international trade day hosted by Liam Fox, the Secretary of State for International Trade. On 19 November 2018, another milestone was met with a F-35B test pilot landing on the ship facing the stern instead of the bow.

=== 2018–2019: Post-Westlant 18 ===
Following the ship's return from Westlant 18, Queen Elizabeth began a maintenance period in early 2019 that saw the installation of the remainder of the ship's self-defence armament, with two Phalanx CIWS mounts fitted. This was followed by the ship's return to Rosyth to allow it to be dry-docked for its first scheduled hull inspection. The remaining Phalanx CIWS and four DS30M mounts will be fitted during 2020.

After further fixed-wing aircraft trials in 2019, using British F-35 aircraft over UK waters, followed then by operational testing. Queen Elizabeth was expected to reach initial operational capability by 2020, now with Commodore Stephen Moorhouse in command. Gavin Williamson announced that the ship's first deployment will be to the Mediterranean, the Middle East and the Pacific region, the last to counter China's territorial claims in the South China Sea.

On 10 January 2019, Jane's Defence Weekly reported that F-35 aircraft of the United Kingdom would join the F-35Bs of the US Marine Corps in embarking Queen Elizabeth for the ship's first operational cruise in 2021.

=== 2019: Westlant 19 ===
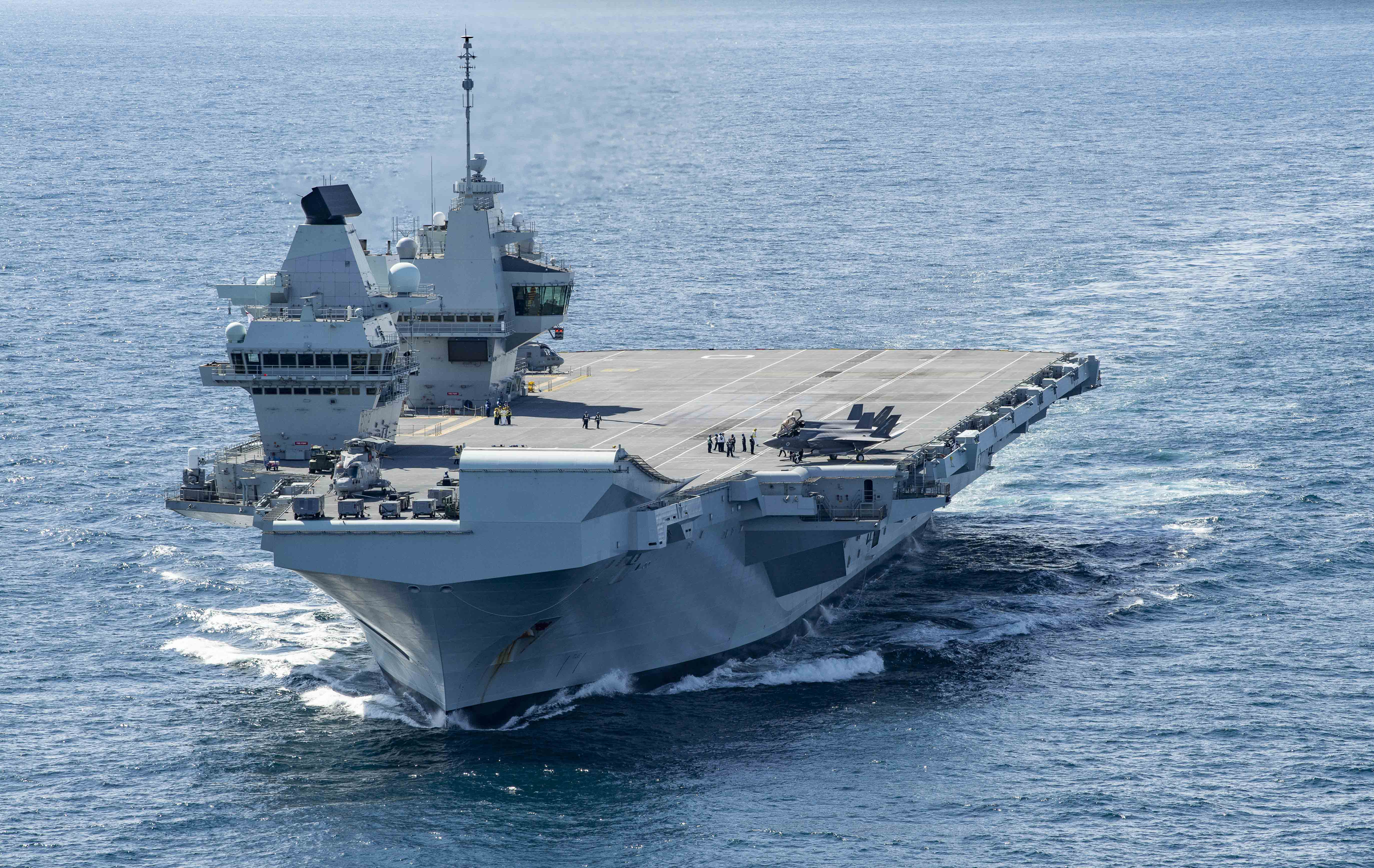
Queen Elizabeth operating with British F-35 aircraft for the first time, October 2019

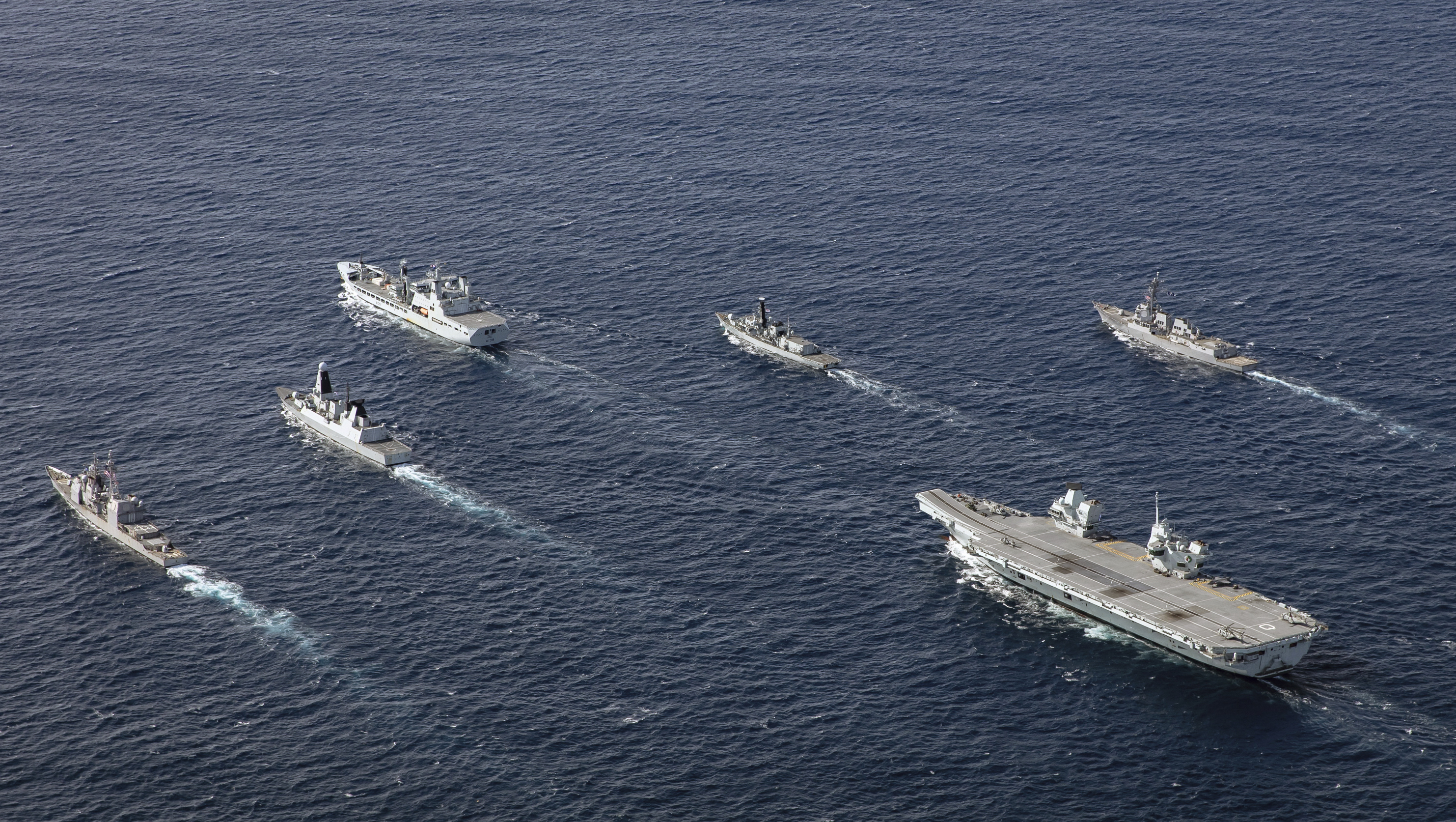
Queen Elizabeth and her Carrier Strike Group during Exercise Westlant 19

Queen Elizabeth departed for her second WESTLANT cruise on 30 August 2019. This deployment was to undertake the second stage of fixed-wing flight testing, and would see the F-35B employed as a full part of the ship's air group, with 617 Squadron due to embark for the first time to operate alongside 17 Squadron, the type's evaluation unit. The deployment will also see the first full up operation of the UK Carrier Strike Group, with Queen Elizabeth to be accompanied by HMS Northumberland and HMS Dragon supported by RFA Tideforce. On 13 October 2019, F-35Bs from 17 Squadron landed on HMS Queen Elizabeth for the first time.

HMS Queen Elizabeth arrived home in Portsmouth on 4 December 2019. On 16 December 2019, the first-ever F-35B launch in British territorial waters took place, when an aircraft of that model took off from the flight deck of HMS Queen Elizabeth in Portsmouth Harbour. The aircraft, registration ZM148 (BK14) safely returned to its base at RAF Marham on the same day. ZM148 (BK14) had developed a fault during Westlant19 and was retained aboard Queen Elizabeth for repair.

=== 2019–2021: Post-Westlant 19 ===
HMS Queen Elizabeth departed Portsmouth in January 2020 for flight trials in UK waters for the first time and was joined by British-owned F-35B Lightning aircraft from RAF No. 207 Squadron. In June 2020, F-35Bs from 617 Squadron landed on Queen Elizabeth for Operational Sea Training to prepare for Initial Operating Capability (Maritime) by the end of 2020.

The summer 2020 period was spent in harbour undergoing preparation work for September, when the ship took part in a major carrier group exercise that was run as part of Exercise Joint Warrior, with the Queen Elizabeth accompanied not just by ships of the Royal Navy, but also an escort from both the US and Dutch navies, as well as two squadrons of F-35Bs- one each from both the RAF and USMC. Following the conclusion of Joint Warrior, the ship returned to port to have the remainder of its equipment fitted, while the joint UK/US air group undertook a further exercise from RAF Marham.

Initial Operating Capability was announced on 4 January 2021, and on 27 January, the ship assumed the role of Fleet Flagship of the Royal Navy, taking over from amphibious transport dock HMS Albion.

=== 2021: Carrier Strike Group 21 ===
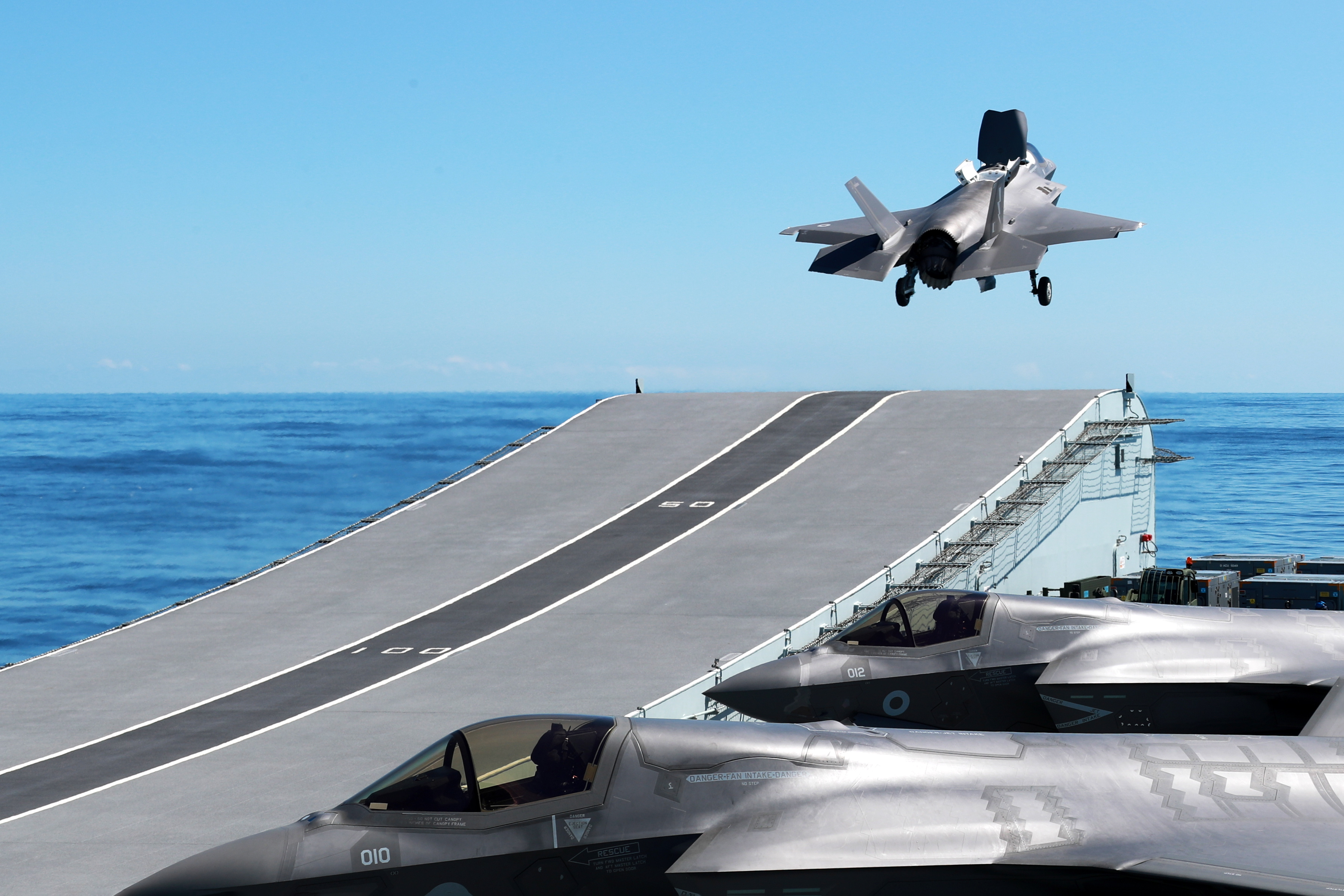
F-35B of 617 Squadron takes off during Carrier Sea Training in 2020.

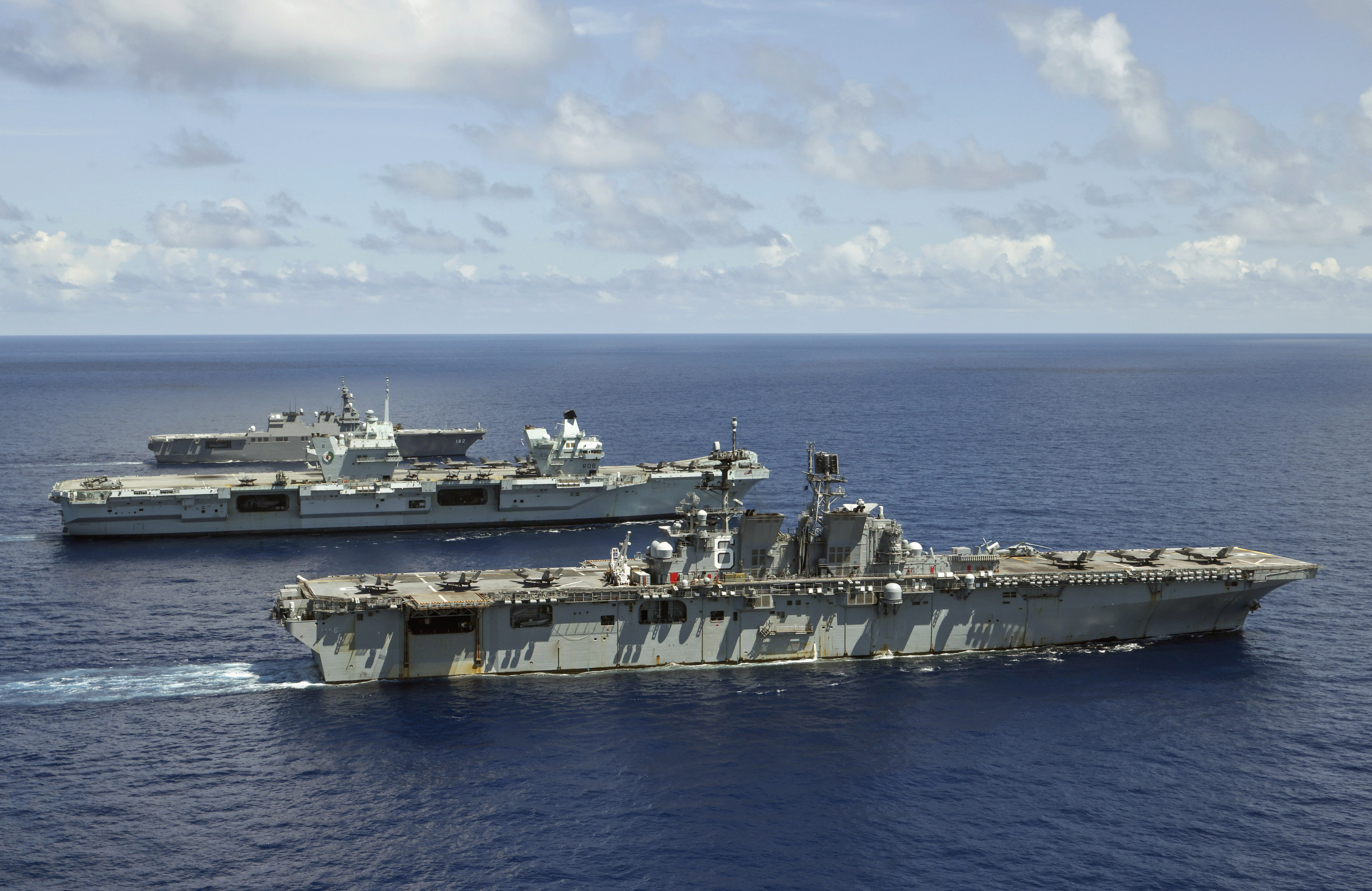
HMS Queen Elizabeth alongside USS America and JS Ise on 24 August 2021

Between 7 and 21 May, the Carrier Strike Group took part in Exercise Strike Warrior, as part of Exercise Joint Warrior 21-1 Once the carrier strike group finished Exercise Strike Warrior, it made its way back to HMNB Portsmouth for final preparations, before finally departing on 23 or 24 May. On 21 May, Prime Minister Boris Johnson toured the ship. Queen Elizabeth II visited the ship on 22 May. Initially the group took part in joint exercises with NATO partners in the Eastern Atlantic, before entering the Mediterranean Sea, where it more conducted exercises with Mediterranean NATO allies, including with the French carrier Charles de Gaulle, in the dual-carrier exercise named Exercise Gallic Strike before entering port at Souda Bay for a logistic stop. A Type 45 destroyer, HMS Defender and HNLMS Evertsen detached from the group to enter the Black Sea – a visit that was already planned prior to the heightened Russian activity in the region. On 7 July 2021, the group transited the Suez Canal to enter the Indian Ocean where they conducted joint exercises with the Indian Navy before proceeding past Singapore, without stopping, to enter the disputed South China Sea region to conduct freedom of navigation exercises in the area with the US Navy. Subsequently, the group will pay a visit to South Korea and then conduct exercises with the Japan Maritime Self-Defense Force and United States Navy around the islands of Japan.

On 18 June 2021, Queen Elizabeth began combat operations against ISIS, supporting Operation Inherent Resolve. F-35B aircraft from 617 Squadron, RAF and US Marine Fighter Attack Squadron 211 (VMFA-211) launched strikes from Queen Elizabeth to attack ISIS targets in Iraq and Syria.

An outbreak of COVID-19 was reported on Queen Elizabeth and her escort ships on 14 July 2021. The British Defence Secretary stated that the outbreak was being managed and that all personnel in the Carrier Strike Group had been vaccinated against COVID-19. Mitigation measures were also in place aboard the warships including the use of masks, social distancing and a "Track and Trace system" to monitor personnel movement. The deployment proceeded as planned to Japan.

On 26 July 2021, Queen Elizabeth and her escort ships conducted a passage exercise with three ships from the Republic of Singapore Navy (RSN) in the South China Sea. This is the first time that a Royal Navy Carrier Strike Group has conducted military exercises with the RSN. On 16 November 2021, one of the carrier's F-35B fighters, ZM152 from 617 Squadron, crashed during operations in the Mediterranean. The pilot was able to eject safely.

=== 2023: Carrier Strike Deployment 23 ===
In September 2023, Queen Elizabeth embarked eight F-35B Lightning strike fighters from 617 Squadron, five Merlin HM2 helicopters from 820 Squadron and three Wildcat AH1 helicopters from 847 Squadron, as its air group, for its "Operation FIREDRAKE" deployment in northern European waters, specifically in the North Sea, Norwegian Sea and the North Atlantic. Of the five Merlins deployed, two were in the Crowsnest AEW configuration. The carrier was escorted by the destroyer HMS Diamond, the frigate HMS Kent and the replenishment tanker RFA Tideforce.

=== 2024: Post CSD 23 ===
On 4 September 2024, a member of Royal Navy personnel died after a Merlin Mk. 4 helicopter ditched in the English Channel near Dorset while conducting night flying exercises with HMS Queen Elizabeth. The two other crew onboard were taken to hospital.

=== 2025–2026: Major refit and return to sea ===
HMS Queen Elizabeth went into Rosyth in July 2025 for a major refit. Following its completion, she returned to sea in April 2026.

== Aircraft ==
The two ships of the Queen Elizabeth class are each expected to be capable of carrying over forty aircraft, with a normal maximum load of thirty-six F-35s and four helicopters, but with a theoretical surge capacity of up to 72 aircraft. The 2010 SDSR anticipated the routine peacetime deployment of twelve F-35Bs, but a typical warload will be 24 F-35Bs and some helicopters. These could be a "Maritime Force Protection" package of nine anti-submarine Merlin HM2 and five Merlin Crowsnest for airborne early warning; alternatively a littoral manoeuvre package could include a mix of Royal Navy Commando Helicopter Force Merlin HC4, Wildcat AH1, RAF Chinooks, and Army Air Corps Apaches. In 2022, it was reported that initially five Merlins will be equipped with Crowsnest, and three of these will normally be assigned to the "high readiness" aircraft carrier.

The hangars are designed for CH-47 Chinook operations without blade folding and for the V-22 Osprey tiltrotor, whilst the aircraft lifts can accommodate two Chinooks with unfolded blades.

== Passenger transfer boats ==
Class overview
- Builders: Alnmaritec
- Operators: Royal Navy
- Planned: 4
- Completed: 4

General characteristics
- Length: 13.1 m
- Beam: 3.6 m
- Draught: 0.6 m
- Propulsion: 2 × Cummins QSC8.3 600 bhp (450 kW) diesel engines; 2 × Ultrajet UJ377
- Speed: 18 kn (33 km/h)
- Complement: 2

The two ships of the Queen Elizabeth class can each carry up to three passenger transfer boats (PTBs) made by Blyth-based company Alnmaritec. Each PTB carries 36 passengers and two crew to operate the vessel. The boat is 13.1 m long and davit-launched. To enable the craft to fit into the docking area the navigation and radar masts are fitted with Linak actuators so that they can be lowered automatically from the command console. The enclosed cabin is heated and there is a set of heads forward.

- The first boat is named Swordfish, after the World War II-era Fairey Swordfish torpedo bomber.
- The second PTB is named Buccaneer after the Blackburn Buccaneer maritime strike aircraft.
- The third is named Sea Vixen, after the de Havilland Sea Vixen naval fighter.
- The fourth is named Sea Harrier, after the V/STOL British Aerospace Sea Harrier.

== Weapons systems ==
Defensive weapons include the Phalanx CIWS (Close-In Weapons System) for anti-aircraft and anti-missile defence, and 30mm Automated Small Calibre Guns (fitted for but not with, and not carried as of 2021.) and initially Miniguns for use against fast attack craft. In 2023, the Minigun was retired from Royal Navy service and replaced by Browning .50 caliber heavy machine guns. Air defence is provided by the Type 45 destroyers, while frigates provide anti-submarine and other general escort capabilities.

=== Munitions handling ===
Incorporated into the first two blocks is a sophisticated handling and deployment system for air weapons known as the Highly Mechanised Weapon Handling System (HMWHS), with the aim of achieving a sortie generation rate which is about six times faster than any previous Royal Navy aircraft carrier. The system requires only 50 people and could be operated with as few as 12 in an emergency; it is estimated that 160 would be needed to produce the same efficiency with conventional equipment. The system moves munitions on pallets by means of remotely controlled electric vehicles and lifts.

== Affiliations ==
- City of London
- Queen Mary 2
- Royal Navy and Royal Marines Charity
- Heart of Midlothian F.C.
- Rolls-Royce Enthusiasts' Club
- Oxford URNU
- Sea Cadets London Eastern District

=== Freedom of Entry ===
- Town of Wantage – granted on Monday, 14 October 2019.

== See also ==
- Future of the Royal Navy
- HMS Prince of Wales
