= Opal Carew =

Canadian erotic romance novelist

Opal Carew is a Canadian erotic romance novelist. She also writes erotica under the name Ruby Carew and sweet romance under the name Amber Carew.

== Biography ==
Carew was born in Toronto and was the youngest of five siblings. She majored in math in college, and then worked as a software developer, before resigning shortly after the birth of her second child in the early 1990s to focus on writing. After she began writing, she found that it was important to her to create erotic romance books that portray sex in a positive light. She wants women to feel good about enjoying sexual feelings.

Carew lives in Ontario, Canada and has two children.

== Work ==
During the 1990s, Carew sold romantic short stories to magazines. Her first book was published in 2004, and her first large publishing deal was with St. Martin's Press in 2007. She mainly publishes erotic romance, but also writes erotica under the pseudonym Ruby Carew and sweet romance under the pseudonym Amber Carew. Carew writes around three books a year and enjoys writing about women who are "un-apologetically empowered by their sexuality." Kirkus Reviews writes that "Carew is known for adding a compelling emotional dimension to erotica." They wrote that her 2013 novel, Illicit, was "Not for the faint of heart." His to Possess (2014) is a story that not only focuses on an eventual threesome, but also has an interesting plot, according to Publishers Weekly. In Stepbrother, Mine (2015), the plot deals with taboos relating to incest, but mostly focuses on romance. Carew's 2017 book, A Fare to Remember is an erotic fantasy that includes graphic sex scenes. Publishers Weekly found A Fare to Remember to be "an easy miss."

== Selected bibliography ==
=== Print ===
- Twin Fantasies, St. Martin's Press, 2007. ISBN 978-0312367787
- Swing, St. Martin's Press, 2007. ISBN 978-0312367800
- Blush, St. Martin's Press, 2008. ISBN 978-0312367794
- Six, St. Martin's Press, 2009. ISBN 978-0312384791
- Secret Ties, St. Martin's Press, 2009. ISBN 978-0312384807
- Forbidden Heat, St. Martin's Press, 2010. ISBN 978-0312580131
- Bliss, St. Martin's Press, 2010. ISBN 978-0312580148
- Pleasure Bound, St. Martin's Press, 2010. ISBN 978-0312580155
- Total Abandon, St. Martin's Press, 2011. ISBN 978-0312674595
- Secret Weapon, St. Martin's Press, 2011. ISBN 978-0312674601
- Insatiable, St. Martin's Press, 2012. ISBN 978-0312674618
- Illicit, St. Martin's Press, 2013. ISBN 978-0312674625
- His to Command, St. Martin's Press, 2013. ISBN 978-1250033130
- His to Possess, St. Martin's Press, 2014. ISBN 978-0312674649
- His to Claim, St. Martin's Press, 2014. ISBN 978-1250052827
- Riding Steele, St. Martin's Press, 2015. ISBN 978-1250052841 (e-book serialization November–December 2014)
- Hard Ride, St. Martin's Griffin, 2015. ISBN 9781250052834
- Stepbrother, Mine, St. Martin's Griffin, 2015. ISBN 9781466887503
- My Best Friend's Stepfather, St. Martin's Press, 2016. ISBN 9781250052865 (e-book serialization November 2015)
- Nailed, St. Martin's Press, 2016. ISBN 9781250052872
- A Fare to Remember, St. Martin's Press, 2017, ISBN 9781250116680
- Heat, St. Martin's Press, 2017, ISBN 9781250116789
- X Marks the Spot, St. Martin's Press, 2018. ISBN 9781250116802
- Stroke of Luck, St. Martin's Press, 2020. ISBN 9781250116826

=== E-book ===
- The King and I, Samhain Publishing, 2005. ISBN 978-1609284251
- Christmas Angel, Lachesis Publishing, 2009.
- Crystal Genie, Red Sage Publishing, 2010. ISBN 978-1603104784
- The Commander's Woman, Samhain Publishing, 2011. ISBN 978-1609285098
- The Male Stripper, Opal Carew, 2011. ISBN 978-0987854568
- Three, Opal Carew, 2011. ISBN 978-0986965401
- Slaves of Love, Opal Carew, 2011. ISBN 978-0986965470
- The Stranger, Opal Carew, 2012. ISBN 978-0987854582
- Debt of Honor, Opal Carew, 2012. ISBN 978-1927444023
- Passion Play, Sahmain Publishing, 2012. ISBN 978-1609289478
- The Office Slave, Opal Carew, 2012. ISBN 978-1927444047
- Three Men and a Bride, Opal Carew, 2013. ISBN 978-1927444085
- Three Secrets, Opal Carew, 2014. ISBN 978-1-927444-10-8
- Taken By Storm, Opal Carew, 2014. ISBN 978-1927444122
- Hot Ride, Opal Carew, 2014. ISBN 978-1927444115
- Meat, Swerve, 2016, ISBN 9781250118561
- Big Package, Swerve, 2016, ISBN 9781250118554
- Drilled, Swerve, 2017. ISBN 9781250135056

=== Writing as Amber Carew ===
- Captive Lover, Opal Carew, 2011. ISBN 978-1927444009
- Christmas Angel, Opal Carew, 2011. ISBN 978-0987854520
- The Cinderella Obsession, Opal Carew, 2011. ISBN 978-0986966446
- Magical Dawn, Opal Carew, 2011. ISBN 978-0987854506
- Virgin Spy, Opal Carew, 2011. ISBN 978-0987854544
- Virgin Wanted, Opal Carew, 2011. ISBN 978-0986966477
- Virgin Wizard, Opal Carew, 2011. ISBN 978-0986966460
