= Christina Lauren =

American writing duo

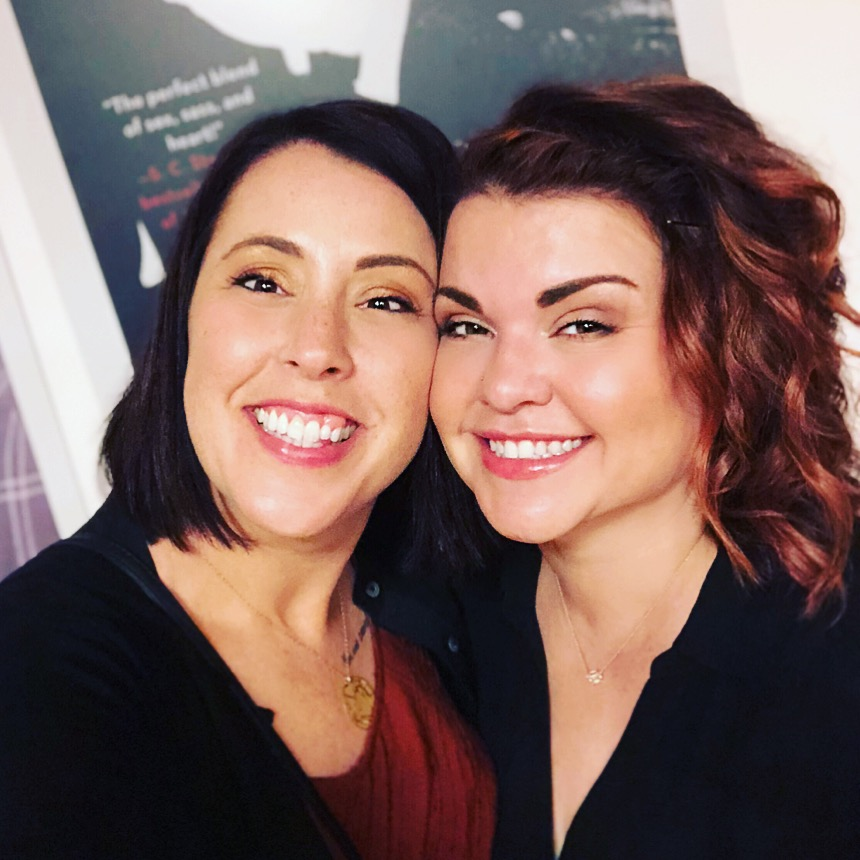
- Lauren Billings (left) and Christina Hobbs (right) at Festival New Romance, Paris France
- Occupation: Novelists
- Writing career
- Period: 2009–present
- Genres: Romance; contemporary literature; erotic romance; young adult
- Notable works: Beautiful Bastard series; Wild Seasons series
- Website: christinalaurenbooks.com

Christina Lauren, the combined pen name of Christina Hobbs and Lauren Billings is an American author duo of contemporary fiction, teen fiction and romance novels.

== Career ==
The pair met in 2009 while writing fanfiction online and, in 2010, became co-authors, signing with agent Holly Root from the Waxman-Leavell Literary Agency in 2011. In 2017, Root founded Root Literary, which still represents Christina Lauren.

Together, they present workshops and speak at events such as RT Booklovers Convention, Book Expo of America (BEA), and Romance Writers of America (RWA), and are frequent guests at San Diego Comic Con. In 2024 they were invited to speak at Simon & Schuster's 100th anniversary celebration.

Along with fellow writer Nina Bocci, the pair created and ran a non-profit organization known as Fandom Gives Back. From 2009 to 2012 Fandom Gives Back raised over $235,000 for Alex's Lemonade Stand.

== Reception and adaptations ==
=== Beautiful series ===
In 2013, Beautiful Bastard was optioned by Constantin Film for a film adaptation. The rights later reverted to the authors. In 2026, Variety reported that Fifth Season had acquired the rights with plans to develop it as a TV series. Christina Lauren will co-write the TV version, with Bill Dubuque supervising. Dubuque will also co-produce with Kristen Campo.

=== Wild Seasons series ===
The second series by the authors debuted in 2014. The first novel of the series, Sweet Filthy Boy, earned the Romantic Times Book of the Year award for 2014. The series centers on a group of friends following their graduation from college.

=== Roomies ===
In 2018, Andy Fickman was scheduled to direct and produce the romantic comedy Roomies with Jenna Dewan via Dewan's company, Everheart Productions. Christina Lauren was to write the screenplay.

=== In a Holidaze ===
In 2024, screenwriter Tiffany Paulsen signed a deal to script In a Holidaze, a Netflix feature adaptation of the New York Times bestselling holiday rom-com novel of the same name. In 2025, it was announced that Maddie Ziegler, Rob Lowe, Graham Phillips, and Elias Kacavas had signed on to star, with Tiffany Paulsen to direct. Leslie Morgenstein will produce alongside Alloy Entertainment's Elysa Koplovitz Dutton, with Lowe executive producing. Shooting began in January 2026. It will air on Netflix Dec 2, 2026.

== Honors ==
- 2013 Best Romance Nominee Goodreads Choice Awards (Beautiful Bastard)
- 2013 Best Romance Audible.com (Beautiful Stranger)
- 2014 RT Seal of Excellence Award (Sweet Filthy Boy)
- 2014 RT Book of the Year (Sweet Filthy Boy)
- 2014 Goodreads Choice Nominee Best Romance (Sweet Filthy Boy)
- 2015 Kirkus Starred Review (The House)
- 2016 An Amazon Editor's Choice Best Books of 2016 (Wicked Sexy Liar)
- 2017 Kirkus Starred Review (Dating You/Hating You)
- 2017 Amazon Best Romance of the Year (Dating You/Hating You)
- 2017 Publishers Weekly Starred Review (Roomies)
- 2017 Goodreads Choice Nominee Best Young Adult Fiction (Autoboyography)
- 2017 Best of the Year Finalist Audible.com (Autoboyography)
- 2017 American Library Association Rainbow List (Autoboyography)
- 2017 Lambda Literary Award Finalist (Autoboyography)
- 2017 Vulture Top Ten Romance (Dating You/Hating You)
- 2017 Washington Post Top Five Romance (Dating You/Hating You)
- 2017 Entertainment Weekly Top Ten Romance (Roomies)
- 2018 Kirkus Starred Review (Love and Other Words)
- 2018 Kirkus Starred Review (Josh and Hazel's Guide to Not Dating)
- 2018 Publishers Weekly Starred Review (My Favorite Half-Night Stand)
- 2018 Goodreads Choice Nominee Best Romance (Roomies)
- 2018 Goodreads Choice Nominee Best Romance (Josh and Hazel's Guide to Not Dating)
- 2018 Amazon Best Romances of the Year (Josh and Hazel's Guide to Not Dating)
- 2018 New York Public Library Best Books of the Year (Josh and Hazel's Guide to Not Dating)
- 2019 Kirkus Starred Review (The Unhoneymooners)
- 2019 Publishers Weekly Starred Review (The Unhoneymooners)
- 2019 Library Journal Starred Review (The Unhoneymooners)
- 2019 Indie Next List (The Unhoneymooners)
- 2019 Goodreads Choice Nominee Best Romance (The Unhoneymooners)
- 2019 Amazon Best Romances of the Year (The Unhoneymooners)
- 2019 Audible Best Rom Coms of the Year (The Unhoneymooners)
- 2019 Library Reads Hall of Fame
- 2019 Bookbub Best Romances of the Year (The Unhoneymooners)
- 2019 Indie Next List (Twice in a Blue Moon)
- 2020 Bookpage Best Romance Novels of 2020 So Far (The Honey-Don't List)
- 2020 Kirkus Starred Review (The Honey Don't List)
- 2020 Publishers Weekly Starred Review (In a Holidaze)
- 2020 Library Journal Starred Review (In a Holidaze)
- 2020 Book Page Starred Review (In a Holidaze)
- 2020 Goodreads Choice Nominee Best Romance (In a Holidaze)
- 2020 Oprah's Romance Novels We Couldn't Put Down (The Honey Don't List)
- 2021 Audie Award Finalist Best Romance (The Honey Don't List)
- 2021 Kirkus Starred Review (The Soulmate Equation)
- 2021 ALA Booklist Starred Review (The Soulmate Equation)
- 2021 Indie Next List (The Soulmate Equation)
- 2021 Library Journal Starred Review (The Soulmate Equation)
- 2021 Barnes & Noble Best Books of 2021 (The Soulmate Equation)
- 2021 Indigo Top Ten Romance of 2021 (The Soulmate Equation)
- 2021 Kirkus Best Romances of the Year (The Soulmate Equation)
- 2021 Kobo Best Romances of the Year (The Soulmate Equation)
- 2021 SheReads.com Best Romances of the Year (The Soulmate Equation)
- 2021 Goodreads Choice Nominee Best Romance (The Soulmate Equation)
- 2021 Audible Best of 2021 (The Soulmate Equation)
- 2021 Buzzfeed Best Romance Novels of 2021 (Soulmate Equation)
- 2021 Scribd Best Romance Novels of 2021
- 2022 Kirkus Starred Review (Something Wilder)
- 2022 Booklist Starred Review (Something Wilder)
- 2022 Indie Next List (Something Wilder)
- 2022 Indigo's Top 10 Romance Books of 2022 (Something Wilder)
- 2022 Washington Post 10 Best Romance Novels of 2022 (Something Wilder)
- 2022 Entertainment Weekly's Top 10 Romances of 2022 (Something Wilder)
- 2022 Apple Books Top Selling Romances of the Year (Something Wilder)
- 2023 Library Journal Starred Review (The True Love Experiment)
- 2023 Kirkus Starred Review (The True Love Experiment)
- 2023 Indie Next List (The True Love Experiment)
- 2023 Library Reads Hall of Fame (The True Love Experiment)
- 2023 Audible Editors' Select: May 2023 (The True Love Experiment)
- 2023 Apple Books Best of the Month (The True Love Experiment)
- 2023 Apple Must Listen (The True Love Experiment)
- 2023 Amazon Editors' Picks: Best Romance (The True Love Experiment)
- 2023 BookPage Starred Review (The True Love Experiment)
- 2023 Amazon Best Books of the Year So Far (The True Love Experiment)
- 2023 Apple Books Best Audiobooks of the Year So Far (The True Love Experiment)
- 2023 Audible Best Romances of the Year (Honeymoon Crashers)
- 2023 Goodreads Choice Nominee Best Romance (The True Love Experiment)
- 2023 NPR Best Books of the Year (The True Love Experiment)
- 2024 Audie Award Winner Best Romance of the Year (The True Love Experiment)
- 2024 Audible The Top 100 Series of All Time (Beautiful Bastard)
- 2024 Indie Next List (The Paradise Problem)
- 2024 Amazon Best Books of the Year So Far (The Paradise Problem)
- 2024 Barnes and Noble Best Books of the Year (The Paradise Problem)
- 2024 Goodreads Readers' Top Books Published in the Past Five Years (The Unhoneymooners)
- 2024 Goodreads Choice Nominee Best Romance (The Paradise Problem)
- 2024 Barnes & Noble Best Books of the Year (The Paradise Problem)
- 2024 Amazon Best Books of the Year (The Paradise Problem)
- 2024 Audible Best Romances of the Year (The Exception to the Rule)
- 2024 Book of the Month Nominee for Book of the Year (The Paradise Problem)

== Bibliography ==
=== Beautiful series ===
- Beautiful Bastard (2013)
- Beautiful Stranger (2013)
- Beautiful Bitch (2013)
- Beautiful Bombshell (2013)
- Beautiful Player (2013)
- Beautiful Beginning (2013)
- Beautiful Beloved (2015)
- Beautiful Secret (2015)
- Beautiful Boss (2016)
- Beautiful (2016)

=== Wild Seasons series ===
- Sweet Filthy Boy (2014)
- Dirty Rowdy Thing (2014)
- Dark Wild Night (2015)
- Wicked Sexy Liar (2016)
- Not Joe's Not So Short Short (novella, 2016)

=== Standalones ===
- Sublime (2014)
- The House (2015)
- Dating You/Hating You (2017)
- Autoboyography (2017)
- Roomies (2017)
- Love and Other Words (2018)
- Josh and Hazel's Guide to Not Dating (2018)
- My Favorite Half-Night Stand (2018)
- The Unhoneymooners (2019)
- Twice in a Blue Moon (2019)
- The Honey-Don't List (2020)
- In A Holidaze (2020)
- The Soulmate Equation (2021)
- Something Wilder (2022)
- The True Love Experiment (2023)
- The Honeymoon Crashers (2023)
- The Exception to the Rule (2024)
- The Paradise Problem (2024)
- Tangled Up in You (2024)
- Love and Other Words Deluxe Special Edition (2025)
- The Romance Revival (2026)
