= On Dublin Street =

2012 novel by Samantha Young

- First edition (publ. Smashwords)
- Author: Samantha Young
- Language: English
- Publication date: 2012

On Dublin Street is a 2012 erotic romance novel by Samantha Young.

== Plot ==
Jocelyn Butler, called Joss, is a 22-year-old half-American, half-Scottish woman who finished college, tries to become a writer and is the main protagonist of the series. After losing her whole family during a car accident while she was at school 8 years ago and her best friend afterwards, she decided to build a cool and tough façade in which she doesn't care for anyone and tells everyone bluntly what she feels without feeling guilty. She starts her new life by searching for an apartment to share with a roommate. She finds a free room on Dublin Street, owned by Ellie Carmichael, and pays her a visit by taxi.

On her way, she is invited to a taxi ride with an attractive and seemingly intimidating man, whom she refers as 'The Suit'. After talking to him and realizing that she's already attracted to him, Joss shows off her coolness, pretending to be completely indifferent about him, which pleases him. When he asks her if she's got a name, Joss cheekily replies that she has two and leaves him hanging. In the new apartment, which Joss finds fantastic because of its elegant design, she meets Ellie Carmichael, a bubbly and sweet blonde-haired university student, to whom Joss becomes unwillingly attached. Much to her shock she also finds out that the so-called 'Suit' is her older brother and the owner of the famous club Fire.

In the upcoming events, Joss' plan to remain aloof gets rebuffed when she's invited to Ellie's and Braden's family dinner at the Nichols. She tries to refuse at first but later feels guilty about doing so and agrees. In the Nichols house, she meets Ellie's mother Elodie and her stepfather Clark and also Ellie's younger siblings Hannah and Declan. She finds out that Braden and Ellie have the same dad, Douglas Carmichael, who never asked after them and died, and that Braden views Ellie's family more as family than his own mother and that he had to mature at a very young age. Joss suddenly feels pity, trying to think of a young Braden and is embarrassed that she cares, while it pleases Ellie. During dinner, the close family atmosphere provokes a panic attack in Joss of which she's ashamed. Yet the family doesn't talk about it in front her because they know it makes her uncomfortable and Joss feels touched, especially after Braden's only purpose is to make sure she's okay. In later events, Joss' attraction to Braden and her panic attacks become more overwhelming and she decides to go to a psychologist, Dr. Kathryn Pritchard, to find a solution for that problem. She finds herself piece by piece, but still refuses to acknowledge her affections for both Braden and Ellie. While being busy with becoming soft, Joss is also haunted by her past. While writing a fantasy story with her parents in the lead roles, she has a panic attack in the gym after thinking of happy times with them and she has to help her friend Rhian with her boyfriend James, who shows up at Joss and Ellie's apartment. Also, Joss still feels guilty about the death of her former friend Dru, who was interested in a guy on whom Joss had a crush on too but didn't tell her, to prevent from hurting her, when they were teens. In a park meeting, where she meets Jenna and Ed, Ellie's friends from University, Joss realizes that Ellie has strong feelings for Adam, Braden's best friend, and wonders if he reciprocates them.

In the meantime, Joss' and Braden's relationship gets to its climax when Braden attempts to make Joss jealous by being with a beautiful woman who is married and Joss reacts back when Craig, who had been interested in her, makes out with her without her stopping him. During her break, Joss and Braden confront each other and lose control by making out and almost having sex. They are interrupted by another co-worker, Alistair, and Braden uses the moment to get Joss to a conversation about their situation, to which Joss reluctantly agrees.

The next day, Braden proposes Joss a non-exclusive friends with benefits relationship, to which Joss, although trying to negotiate with him, agrees and they both end up having sex for the first time with Joss being blown away. In the following months, Joss realizes that she doesn't only like Ellie and her family but that she also loves Braden. Because of her fear of losing him, she tries to keep her distance from him. When Ellie invites Joss over to a party in Fire, Ellie accidentally spills that some of Braden's ex-girlfriends would be there, forcing Joss to become jealous and flirting with Gavin whom she met at the gym and who helped her while she was having a panic attack. The whole evening ends in a fiasco when Braden, outraged, hits him. It turns out that Gavin was the guy Analise, Braden's then fiancée, cheated on him with. Braden didn't care actually but when he saw him flirting with Joss, he hit him, although from previous events he swore to never become that violent again. Joss feels guilty but after Braden takes her to his office and confronts her about it, she snaps and screams at him for flirting with other women who were his ex-girlfriends and asks him, hurt and upset, if she was so worthless that he could do that to her. Braden comforts her and apologizes for his behavior, while Joss replies that she can't be hurt by him. But the fact that he did hurt her is proof enough for Braden that she loves him and when he has sex with her on the desk, to read her feelings for him in her gray eyes which become soft with him, he knows that he loves her and that she belongs to him.

Soon after, Joss falls back to her closed-off persona when it turns out that Ellie has a brain tumor that could result in cancer. Shocked and scared that she could lose another person she loves, Joss breaks up with Braden out of fear of losing him too and keeps distance from him and Ellie. While Braden, upset and hurt, gets advice from Elodie, Joss crashes at Jo's apartment and seeks help from Dr. Pritchard, who motivates her to fight her demons. After Braden says that she owes Ellie an apology if she's already convinced that she doesn't love him, Joss decides to be brave and goes to Ellie, comforting her and saying that she loves her and she'd make it.

The next day, while Ellie is still trying to relax before her upcoming surgery, Joss and Braden are in a heated argument in which Braden throws harsh words to hurt her. He pushes her over the edge when he lies to her, saying that he slept with another woman. Hurt and angered, Joss throws plates at him and claims to hate him, while Braden tries to comfort her and ensures that he hasn't been with anyone but her. Still angered but confused about this whole mess, Joss suggests that they should talk after Ellie's full recovery. Braden uses this moment and tells Joss that he loves her and that he'll do everything to make sure she stays his. Joss calls him crazy while Ellie defends her brother, saying that "he's fighting for what he wants". This is also Adam's cue and he appears and declares his love for Ellie in front of his best friend, which Braden accepts without problems, since he already knew about their feelings. He had waited for Adam to go after his sister and called both, because of their "arguments," a nuisance. Annoyed by this fact, Joss walks out but uses her time to congratulate her friend and being happy for her.

In the final moments, it turns out that Ellie's surgery went well and she tries to bring Joss and Braden back together by saying that Braden has been out with a beautiful woman who might be the manager of Fire. Joss starts to feel upset but thinks it's the best this way. She also decides to fly back to Virginia to deal with her family's death and probably stay there permanently, but is stopped by Braden, who is angry at Joss for still being stubborn about her feelings and trying to do something alone without asking him. When he rips up her ticket, Joss unleashes her full anger and yells at him, saying that she was safe with not caring for someone until him and he should stop trying to fix her. Braden convinces her of his sincerity in his feelings for her and that she isn't as broken as she thinks she is, and Joss finally admits her love for him and both end up having sex together as a real couple. Joss also confides in Braden all her memories of her family and is happy that Braden loves her just the way she is.

At the end, Joss realizes that she's still far from finally moving on. With the help of Braden, she'll be able to find her own peace, recover from her past and find a new start in life, alongside the new people she met and will meet.

Two years later, it turns out that she and Braden will marry and when everyone waits on Joss and asks if she's all right, Joss replies simply with "I'm ready" - ready to take on whatever may come.

== Characters ==
Jocelyn Butler known as Joss and only called Jocelyn by Braden is the main protagonist of the series and the daughter of Luke and Sarah and sister to Beth Butler. She grew up in foster homes until she turned 18 years old and inherited her parents' wealth. She is the best friend of Rhian, until she becomes attached to Ellie and even closer friends with Johanna Walker. Joss is 22-years-old and known as a short, straightforward, attractive and tough young woman with dirty blonde hair, a husky voice and cat-like gray eyes. She tries to become a writer and gets inspiration out of the deep love of her parents. Because of her aloof, sarcastic and stubborn behavior, she is an irresistible challenge for men, yet there are moments where she would behave immature and inconsiderate. Even though she tries to hide it under her façade, Joss cares deeply about the people around her and tries to help whenever she can. She has been in love with Braden the first moment they met and is thankful for having him and his family in her life. In the end, it turns out that she's going to marry him at age 24 and will become Jocelyn Carmichael.

Braden Carmichael is the male lead, 30-years-old and nicknamed 'The Suit'. He had been married to Analise who cheated on him with his former friend, Gavin, and had a fling with Holly before dumping her for Joss. He and Ellie have the same father, Douglas Carmichael and even though he has his mother Evelyn, he prefers Ellie's family over her. Braden has brown hair, ice-blue eyes and is described as intimidating on first glance, attractive, intelligent, dominant and a smart-ass, yet an extremely caring and protective person who cares deeply about his friends in his surroundings and would go great lengths to protect those, he loves. He is able to outsmart Joss and confusing her but is stunned by her quick-wit, strength and her confidence, things which made him fall in love with her in first place. While everyone calls her Joss, Braden calls her Jocelyn because Joss is more of a boys' name and Jocelyn brings out her sexy, sweet and needy side. Braden is an excellent business man and owns Club Fire. He's a loving and over-protective brother to Ellie and loves his best friend Adam as the brother he never had. He proposes to Joss and she accepts, both becoming "The Carmichaels"

Ellie Nichols-Carmichael is Braden's 23-year-old sister and becomes Joss' closest friend. She has blonde hair, ice-blue eyes and is described as a tall, sweet, caring, beautiful and bubbly woman. She and Braden share the same father but she has with Clark Nichols a stepfather and with Hannah and Declan younger half-siblings. She has been in love with Adam since she was 14-years-old and pursued him for almost 10 years, but Adam always rejected her because he didn't want to lose her or Braden. They become a couple before Ellie's successful surgery. Ellie is known for being open-hearted, optimistic and a caring friend and already loving Joss without knowing her too well. She is the first who wins Joss' love immediately, although Joss at first claims, being not interested in Ellie's or Braden's life. She hated Braden's girlfriends Vicky, Holly and Analise and is glad that Joss has managed to get her brother's heart. Like Braden is to her, Ellie is very over-protective over Braden and would always watch out for him. She has her own story written in a diary style, "Until Fountain Bridge".

Adam Gerard Sutherland is Braden's best friend and 30-years-old. He has been Ellie's love interest for 10 years but never pursued her because of his close friendship to both, her and Braden. Adam is relaxed, handsome and Braden's most trusted man in business. He shows his protective side over Ellie when she attempts to go on a date with another person. He declares and confesses his feelings for Ellie when he realizes that he could lose her over surgery, which Braden accepts afterwards, since he knew about their developing relationship beforehand.

Johanna "Jo" Walker is Joss' co-worker in Club 39 and 22-years-old. She has a younger brother named Cole and lives with him and her mother in a little apartment in London Road. Jo is misunderstood as a gold digger because she dates older men with money, when in truth, she tries to pay food and clothes for her brother. She raises Cole as if he was her own child, which is why Joss admires her so much. Jo is known for being extremely beautiful, tall, clever, caring and having a smart mouth, yet she is unsure about herself. She is, without knowing it, the most mature and responsible character, since she raised Cole on her own and managed to keep him safe, although she had been abused. She has her own story in "Down London Road".

Craig Lanagan is Joss' and Jo's co-worker and works as the barkeeper. He is 25, good-looking with brown hair and blue eyes and has underneath his playboy behavior a caring and generous side. He has two sisters Jeannie and Meghan, is protective over his mom and has a sexual interest in Joss because of her challenging attitude. He has his own story in "On King's Way" in which he meets Rain Alexander and falls for her.

Sarah Butler is Joss' mother, of whom Joss inherited her personality. She was a fierce, strong and independent woman and didn't care about other people's opinion of her, to which Braden points out that she reminds him of a certain someone, meaning Joss.

Luke Butler is Joss' father of whom Joss inherited her eyes. She describes her eyes as the prettiest features on herself.

Elizabeth 'Beth' Butler is Joss' little sister whom she loved very much and of whom she has dear memories.

Elodie Nichols: Ellie's mother and Half-Scottish, Half-French. She is optimistic, affectionate, welcoming and a wonderful mother who takes good care of her children, including Braden and Joss and makes sure, they all right. She's later nicknamed as the "Family Monarch" of the "Family Tribe".

Clark Nichols: Elodie's husband and father of Hannah and Declan. He's attentive, smart and a wise man who treats Braden like a son and is proud of Ellie's accomplishments. He's three years younger than Elodie but still the facial authority figure, even if Elodie is called the leader of the tribe.

Hannah Nichols is Ellie's 14-year-old, pretty, clever but shy, later sarcastic, snarky and outgoing sister. She likes reading and adores Braden very much. She has a crush on a boy named Marco D'Alessandro with whom she has a story with "Fall In India Place" as an adult, aged 22. She becomes Cole's best friend.

Declan "Dec" Nichols is Ellie's 10-year-old brother who rarely talks and often argues with Hannah. He idolizes Braden and is often occupied with his own things.

Rhian and James: Joss' friends from University who have an argument which leads almost to a break up but is fixed by Joss.

Dru: Joss' former friend in middle school who liked a guy, who was interested in Joss. She drinks to much alcohol and dies in the sea; Joss blames herself for her death.

Dr. Kathryn Pritchard: Joss' psychologist who helps her finding herself and shows her that she isn't as broken as she thinks she is.

Jenna and Ed: Ellie's friends from University

Gavin: Braden's former friend who cheated with Analise on him. When he tries to make a move on Joss, Braden loses control and hits him, this time really hard, because he feared he could take Joss away from him. It's the point where Braden realizes that he truly loves Joss.

Analise: Braden's ex-wife who cheated on him with Gavin. She's mentioned several times but not actually seen.

Holly: Braden's super-ficial and selfish ex-girlfriend who is embarrassed by Joss and gets dumped after Braden acknowledges Joss' annoyed reaction at her.

== Spin-offs of 'On Dublin Street' ==
- Until Fountain Bridge (Ellie Carmichael/Adam Sutherland)
- Down London Road (Johanna Walker/Cameron MacGabe)
- Before Jamaica Lane (Olivia Holloway/Nate Sawyer)
- Fall In India Place (Hannah Nichols/Marco D'Alessandro)
- Echoes in Scotland Street (Shannon MacLeod /Cole Walker)
- Moonlight On Nightingale Way (Grace Bentley/Logan MacLeod)
- One King's Way (Rain Alexander/Craig Lanagan)
