= Claire Thompson (Royal Navy officer) =

Royal Navy officer

Captain Claire Thompson OBE
- Military career
- Allegiance: United Kingdom
- Branch: Royal Navy
- Service years: 2005–present
- Rank: Captain
- Commands: HMS Queen Elizabeth
- Awards: Officer of the Order of the British Empire

Captain Claire Thompson, formally Captain Claire Thompson OBE RN, is a British Royal Navy officer, serving as Captain of HMS Queen Elizabeth, the flagship of the Royal Navy, since January 2025.

She was made Officer of the Order of the British Empire ("OBE") in 2022. She previously commanded HMS Montrose, recognized as one of the Royal Navy's most effective warships while under Claire Thompson's command.
