= Erotic romance novels =

Literary genre

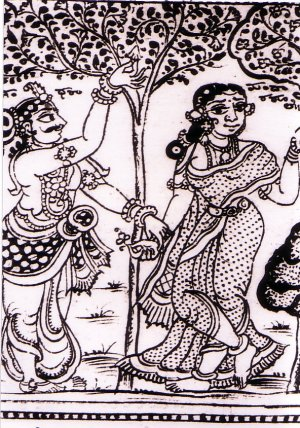
Illustration from the Sougandhika Parinaya (1821 CE)

Erotic romance novels are stories written about the development of a romantic relationship through sexual interaction. The sex is an inherent part of the story, character growth, and relationship development, and could not be removed without damaging the storyline.

== History ==
The subgenre got its start in electronic publishing and small press. High volume sales showed New York publishers there was an untapped market for erotic romance and since 2005 they have incorporated new imprints to meet the demand of readers, which demand is difficult to verify as publishers tend to lump erotic romance in with established categories such as historicals, contemporaries, paranormals, and other subgenres.

== Focus of novels ==
Erotic romance novels have romance as the main focus of the plot line and are characterized by strong, often explicit, sexual content. The books can contain elements of any of the other romance subgenres, such as paranormal elements, chick lit, hen lit, historical fiction, etc. Erotic romance novels are often categorized by one of the categories already defined in the industry.

Erotic romance novels take the reader beyond the bedroom door where more traditional romance does not breach that barrier.

== Guidelines for authors ==
Erotic romance writers generally have more flexibility in pushing the envelope of erotic romance than authors for traditional print publishers, although this has changed dramatically since 2005 when NY publishers began to explore the subgenre with lines such as Aphrodisa and Avon Red. With electronic publishing, the writer has even greater leeway in most instances to write on subjects that in the past have been taboo, such as BDSM and gay literature.

== Examples ==
- His to Possess by Opal Carew
- On Dublin Street by Samantha Young
- Master of the Opera by Jeffe Kennedy
- The Struck by Lightning series by Cecilia Tan
- Unbound by Cara McKenna
- The After book series by Anna Todd
- Big Love by Bari Beckett
- Beautiful Bastard by Christina Lauren

== See also ==
- Erotic fiction
- Romance novel
- Women's erotica
