= Matron literature =

Matron literature (also known as hen lit) is a literary genre which focuses on older female characters as protagonists. The genre has increased in popularity as the baby boomers have aged and female readers have sought characters to identify with. Subjects are often romantic in nature, and heroines are usually between the ages of 45 and 65. Matron lit characters were often married at one point, but are no longer with their spouses or living with their children. There are usually feminist themes in matron literature, though some works are more overtly feminist than others.

Matron literature has only recently become prominent. It can be regarded as a sub-category of boomer lit, although it originated as an offshoot of chick lit, which became quite popular in the late 1990s. The idea of matron literature being chick lit for older women contributed to the alternative term hen lit for the movement. Since matron lit first began, it increased in scope; there are now industry publishing houses devoted solely to matron literature.

Authors of matron literature tend to themselves be women of similar age to their heroines, but are not exclusively so. Works by authors such as Larry McMurtry also are part of the genre. Many matron lit authors have developed popular series of books revolving around the same characters, like Joan Medlicott's Ladies of Covington. Other book titles play on themes of women in middle age, including menopause with The Hot Flash Club, The Crone Club and The Red Hat Club, which plays on the Red Hat Society for women over 50.
