= Criticism of the government response to Hurricane Katrina =

Criticism of the U.S. government

The government response to Hurricane Katrina fell under heavy criticism during the aftermath in the United States in 2005. Local, state, and federal government were accused of failing to prepare and respond effectively to the natural disaster.

Hurricane Katrina landed on August 29, 2005. Within days, the US Government's role in preparations and responding to the storm was covered in heavy public debate. It is thought to be the largely televised footage of distressed politicians and residents who remained in New Orleans without water, food or shelter following the hurricane to be the cause of the criticism. The deaths of several citizens by lack of supplies, and the treatment of evacuees in facilities such as the Superdome also came undone to criticism in the media.

== Criticism in New Orleans ==
New Orleans Mayor Ray Nagin was widely condemned for failing to implement a flood plan and for ordering residents to a shelter of last resort without any provisions for food, water, security, or sanitary conditions. Nagin also delayed his emergency evacuation order until less than a day before landfall, leading to the deaths of hundreds of residents who were unable to evacuate the city prior to the disaster. Adding to the criticism was Nagin's refusal to use a fleet of school buses pictured sitting idle in the city in an image syndicated by the Associated Press. Nagin cited a lack of insurance liability and a shortage of bus drivers for the decision to order residents to shelter in the Superdome, rather than use the available buses to assist in evacuations.

A temporary coalition set up in New Orleans to deal with Hurricane Katrina was another focus of criticism following the disaster. Public and private actors such as the Red Cross attempted to coordinate joint response and recovery efforts, but misunderstandings and system failures are thought to have contributed to the ineffective, temporary, and inefficient evacuation and provision of resources during the disaster.

== Criticism of the evacuation process ==
New Orleans was already one of the poorest metropolitan areas in the United States in 2005, with the eighth-lowest median income in the country. At 24.5%, Orleans Parish had the sixth-highest poverty rate among U.S. counties or county-equivalents. The 2000 U.S. census revealed that 28% of New Orleans households, amounting to approximately 120,000 people, were without private mobility. Despite these factors preventing many people from being able to evacuate on their own, the mandatory evacuation made no special provisions to evacuate homeless, low-income, or sick individuals, nor the city's elderly or infirm residents. Consequently, most of those stranded in the city were the poor, the elderly, and the sick.

The official evacuation order issued for the hurricane stated that from noon on August 28, all city buses were redeployed to shuttle local residents to "refuges of last resort" that had been designated in advance, including the Louisiana Superdome. The orders also stated that the state had prepositioned enough food and water to supply 15,000 citizens with supplies for three days the anticipated waiting period before the Federal Emergency Management Agency (FEMA) would arrive in force and provide supplies for those still in the city. Later, it was found that FEMA had provided these supplies, but FEMA Director Michael D. Brown had underestimated the number of citizens requiring support, and subsequently the first wave of supplies were quickly depleted.

A large number of deaths were a result of the insufficient response and evacuation before Katrina's arrival, primarily due to the reluctance of city and state authorities to issue an evacuation order and risk losing face in the event the hurricane left its predicted path. Had contra-flow on highways been initiated sooner and more of the available school buses were used to evacuate residents, it is believed the numbers of stranded New Orleans occupants would have been significantly less, and subsequently the supplies provided by FEMA would have been more adequate.

== Federal government response to the state of emergency ==
U.S. President George W. Bush signed a $10.5 billion relief package on the evening of September 2, and ordered 7,200 active-duty troops to assist with relief efforts.

Due to the slow response to the hurricane, New Orleans's top emergency management official called the effort a "national disgrace" and questioned when reinforcements would actually reach the increasingly desperate city. New Orleans's emergency operations chief Terry Ebbert blamed the inadequate response on the Federal Emergency Management Agency (FEMA). "This is not a FEMA operation. I haven't seen a single FEMA guy", he said. "FEMA has been here three days, yet there is no command and control. We can send massive amounts of aid to tsunami victims, but we can't bail out the city of New Orleans."

In the early morning of September 2, mayor Ray Nagin expressed his frustration at what he claimed were insufficient reinforcements provided by the President and federal authorities.

However, many police, fire and EMS organizations from outside the affected areas were reportedly hindered or otherwise slowed in their efforts to send help and assistance to the area. FEMA sent hundreds of firefighters who had volunteered to help rescue victims to Atlanta for 2 days of training classes on topics including sexual harassment and the history of FEMA. Official requests for help through the proper chains of command were not forthcoming due to local and state delays in engaging FEMA for federal assistance, even after approached by such authorities. Local police and other EMS workers found the situation traumatic; at least two officers committed suicide, and over 300 deserted the city after gang violence and "turf wars" erupted around the city. A report by the Appleseed Foundation, a public policy network, found that local entities (nonprofit and local government agencies) were far more flexible and responsive than the federal government or national organizations. The federal response was often constrained by lack of legal authority or by ill-suited eligibility and application requirements. In many instances, federal staff and national organizations did not seem to have the flexibility, training, and resources to meet demands on the ground."

=== Presidential role ===
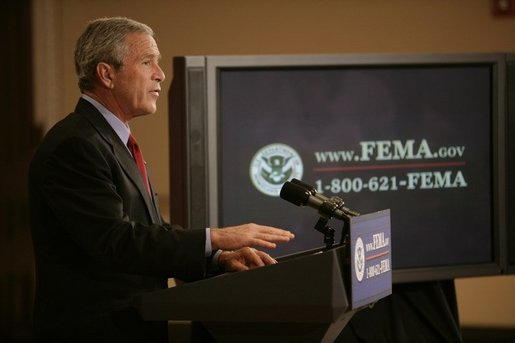
President George W. Bush addresses FEMA on Hurricane Katrina assistance. September 8, 2005.

Early Tuesday morning, August 30, a day after the hurricane struck, President Bush attended a V-J Day commemoration ceremony at Coronado, California, while looking over the situation with his aides and cabinet officials. 24 hours before the ceremony, storm surges began overwhelming levees and floodwalls protecting the city of New Orleans, greatly exacerbating the minimal damage from rainfall and wind when the hurricane itself veered to the East and avoided a direct hit on New Orleans. Initial reports of leaked video footage of top-level briefings held before the storm claimed that this video contradicted Bush's earlier statements that no one anticipated the breach of the levees. Transcripts revealed that Bush was warned that the levees may overflow, as were Governor Blanco and Mayor Nagin.

Bush was criticised for not returning to Washington, D.C. from his vacation in Texas until after Wednesday afternoon, more than a day after the hurricane hit on Monday.

Bush flew over the devastated area in Air Force One as he traveled from Texas back to Washington, D.C., and subsequently visited the Gulf Coast on Friday and was briefed on Hurricane Katrina. Turning to his aides during the flyover, Bush remarked, "It's totally wiped out. It's devastating, it's got to be doubly devastating on the ground." Later, in a televised address from the White House, he said, "We're dealing with one of the worst national disasters in our nation's history."

Vice President Dick Cheney was also criticized in his role in the aftermath. On the night of August 30, and again the next morning, he personally called the manager of the Southern Pines Electric Power Association and ordered him to divert power crews to electrical substations in nearby Collins, Mississippi, that were essential to the operation of the Colonial Pipeline, which carries gasoline and diesel fuel from Texas to the Northeast. The power crews were reportedly reluctant to divert the power, as they were in the process of restoring power to two local hospitals, but agreed to comply with the request.

In January 2006, the President gave his 2006 State of the Union Address:

As we renew the promise of our institutions, let us also show the character of America in our compassion and care for one another ...

A hopeful society comes to the aid of fellow citizens in times of suffering and emergency -- and stays at it until they're back on their feet. So far the federal government has committed $85 billion to the people of the Gulf Coast and New Orleans. We're removing debris and repairing highways and rebuilding stronger levees. We're providing business loans and housing assistance. Yet as we meet these immediate needs, we must also address deeper challenges that existed before the storm arrived.

In New Orleans and in other places, many of our fellow citizens have felt excluded from the promise of our country. The answer is not only temporary relief, but schools that teach every child, and job skills that bring upward mobility, and more opportunities to own a home and start a business. As we recover from a disaster, let us also work for the day when all Americans are protected by justice, equal in hope, and rich in opportunity.

In January 2007, the fired FEMA director Michael D. Brown charged that partisan politics had played a role in the White House's decision to federalize emergency response to the disaster in Louisiana only, rather than along the entire affected Gulf Coast region, which Brown said he had advocated. "Unbeknownst to me, certain people in the White House were thinking, 'We had to federalize Louisiana because she's a white, female Democratic governor, and we have a chance to rub her nose in it,'" Brown said, speaking before a group of graduate students at the Metropolitan College of New York on January 19, 2007. "'We can't do it to Haley [Mississippi governor Haley Barbour] because Haley's a white male, Republican governor. And we can't do a thing to him. So we're just gonna federalize Louisiana.'" The White House fervently denied Brown's charges through a spokeswoman.

Discussion of the recovery efforts for Hurricane Katrina took a back seat to terrorism and Iraq in his 2006 State of the Union Address. In that speech, Bush did not mention any human suffering caused by the storm or its aftermath and did not acknowledge any shortcomings in his administration's response. Many people criticized Bush for failing to mention hurricane recovery in his 2007 State of the Union Address.

==== Investigation of State of Emergency declaration ====
In a September 26, 2005 hearing, former FEMA chief Michael Brown testified before a U.S. House subcommittee about FEMA's response. During that hearing, Representative Stephen Buyer (R-IN) inquired as to why President Bush's declaration of a state of emergency of August 27 had not included the coastal parishes of Orleans, Jefferson, and Plaquemines. (In fact, the declaration did not include any of Louisiana's coastal parishes; rather, they were included in the declaration dated August 29.) Brown testified that this was because Louisiana governor Blanco had not included those parishes in her initial request for aid, a decision that he found "shocking". After the hearing, Blanco released a copy of a letter dated August 28 that showed her requesting assistance for "all the southeastern parishes including the City of New Orleans" as well as specifically naming 14 parishes including Jefferson, Orleans, and Plaquemines.

=== Department of Homeland Security ===
Hurricane Katrina was arguably the first major test of the Department of Homeland Security after September 11. There have been questions on who was in charge of the disaster and who had jurisdictional authority. According to many media outlets, as well as many politicians, the response to the disaster was inadequate in terms of leadership and response.

On September 4, 2005, Michael Chertoff, the Secretary of Homeland Security, held a press conference stating:

This is really one which I think was breathtaking in its surprise ... There has been, over the last few years, some specific planning for the possibility of a significant hurricane in New Orleans with a lot of rainfall, with water rising in the levees and water overflowing the levee ... And although the planning was not complete, a lot of work had been done. But there were two problems here. First of all, it's as if someone took that plan and dropped an atomic bomb simply to make it more difficult. We didn't merely have the overflow, we actually had the break in the wall. And I will tell you that, really, that perfect storm of a combination of catastrophes exceeded the foresight of the planners, and maybe anybody's foresight.

Chertoff's remarks were heavily criticized, as the scenario of a levee breach had been previously envisioned by the Army Corps of Engineers and the storm had closely followed the National Weather Service predictions.

On September 13, 2005, a memo was leaked that indicated that Chertoff issued 36 hours after the hurricane's landfall which read, in part, "As you know, the President has established the 'White House Task Force on Hurricane Katrina Response.' He will meet with us tomorrow to launch this effort. The Department of Homeland Security, along with other Departments, will be part of the task force and will assist the Administration with its response to Hurricane Katrina." The memo activated the National Response Plan and made Michael D. Brown responsible for federal action. The article found:

White House and homeland security officials wouldn't explain why Chertoff waited some 36 hours to declare Katrina an incident of national significance and why he didn't immediately begin to direct the federal response from the moment on Aug. 27 when the National Hurricane Center predicted that Katrina would strike the Gulf Coast with catastrophic force in 48 hours. Nor would they explain why Bush felt the need to appoint a separate task force. Chertoff's hesitation and Bush's creation of a task force both appear to contradict the National Response Plan and previous presidential directives that specify what the secretary of homeland security is assigned to do without further presidential orders. The goal of the National Response Plan is to provide a streamlined framework for swiftly delivering federal assistance when a disaster – caused by terrorists or Mother Nature – is too big for local officials to handle.

==== Federal Emergency Management Agency ====
The Federal Emergency Management Agency was heavily criticized in the aftermath of Hurricane Katrina, primarily for its slow response and inability to coordinate its efforts with other federal agencies relief organizations. Chicago Mayor Richard Daley (D) said of the slow federal response, "I was shocked. We are ready to provide considerably more help than they have requested. We are just waiting for the call. I don't want to sit here and all of a sudden we are all going to be political. Just get it done."

FEMA was accused of deliberately slowing things down, in an effort to ensure that all assistance and relief workers were coordinated properly. For example, Michael D. Brown, the head of FEMA, on August 29, urged all fire and emergency services departments not to respond to counties and states affected by Hurricane Katrina without being requested and lawfully dispatched by state and local authorities under mutual aid agreements and the Emergency Management Assistance Compact.

FEMA also interfered in the Astor Hotel's plans to hire 10 buses to carry approximately 500 guests to higher ground. Federal officials commandeered the buses, and told the guests to join thousands of other evacuees at the Ernest N. Morial Convention Center. In other instances of FEMA asserting its authority to only ultimately make things worse, FEMA officials turned away three Walmart trailer trucks loaded with water, prevented the Coast Guard from delivering 1,000 gallons of diesel fuel, and on Saturday they cut the Jefferson Parish emergency communications line, leading the sheriff to restore it and post armed guards to protect it from FEMA. The Wal-Mart delivery had actually been turned away a week earlier, on Sunday, August 28, before the hurricane struck. A caravan of 13 Wal-Mart tractor-trailers was reported in New Orleans by September 1. Additionally, more than 50 civilian aircraft responding to separate requests for evacuations from hospitals and other agencies swarmed to the area a day after Katrina hit, but FEMA blocked their efforts. Aircraft operators complained that FEMA waved off a number of evacuation attempts, saying the rescuers were not authorized. "Many planes and helicopters simply sat idle," said Thomas Judge, president of the Assn. of Air Medical Services.

It was also reported that FEMA replaced the hospital identification bracelets on some patients being evacuated or transferred with FEMA ID bracelets, causing hospital personnel to lose track of their patients. One hospital CEO stated that three months after the storm, the hospital staff still could not locate some of their patients who had been evacuated.

Senator Mary Landrieu (D-Louisiana), was particularly critical of FEMA's efforts in a statement: "[T]he U.S. Forest Service had water-tanker aircraft available to help douse the fires raging on our riverfront, but FEMA has yet to accept the aid. When Amtrak offered trains to evacuate significant numbers of victims—far more efficiently than buses—FEMA again dragged its feet. Offers of medicine, communications equipment, and other desperately needed items continue to flow in, only to be ignored by the agency. But perhaps the greatest disappointment stands at the breached 17th Street levee. Touring this critical site yesterday with the President, I saw what I believed to be a real and significant effort to get a handle on a major cause of this catastrophe. Flying over this critical spot again this morning, less than 24 hours later, it became apparent that yesterday we witnessed a hastily prepared stage set for a Presidential photo opportunity; and the desperately needed resources we saw were this morning reduced to a single, lonely piece of equipment. The good and decent people of southeast Louisiana and the Gulf Coast—black and white, rich and poor, young and old—deserve far better from their national government."

The New York Times reported that 91,000 tons of ice ordered by FEMA at a cost of over $100 million and intended for hospitals and food storage for relief efforts never made it to the disaster area. Federally contracted truck drivers instead received orders from FEMA to deliver the ice to government rented storage facilities around the country, as far north as Maine. In testimony to a House panel, FEMA director Michael D. Brown stated that "I don't think that's a federal government responsibility to provide ice to keep my hamburger meat in my freezer or refrigerator fresh."

In a September 15, 2005 New York Times opinion column about the privately owned Methodist Hospital in New Orleans, Bob Herbert wrote, "Incredibly, when the out-of-state corporate owners of the hospital responded to the flooding by sending emergency relief supplies, they were confiscated at the airport by FEMA."

A September 16, 2005 CNN article about Chalmette Medical Center stated, "Doctors eager to help sick and injured evacuees were handed mops by federal officials who expressed concern about legal liability ... And so they mopped, while people died around them."

Michael Brown

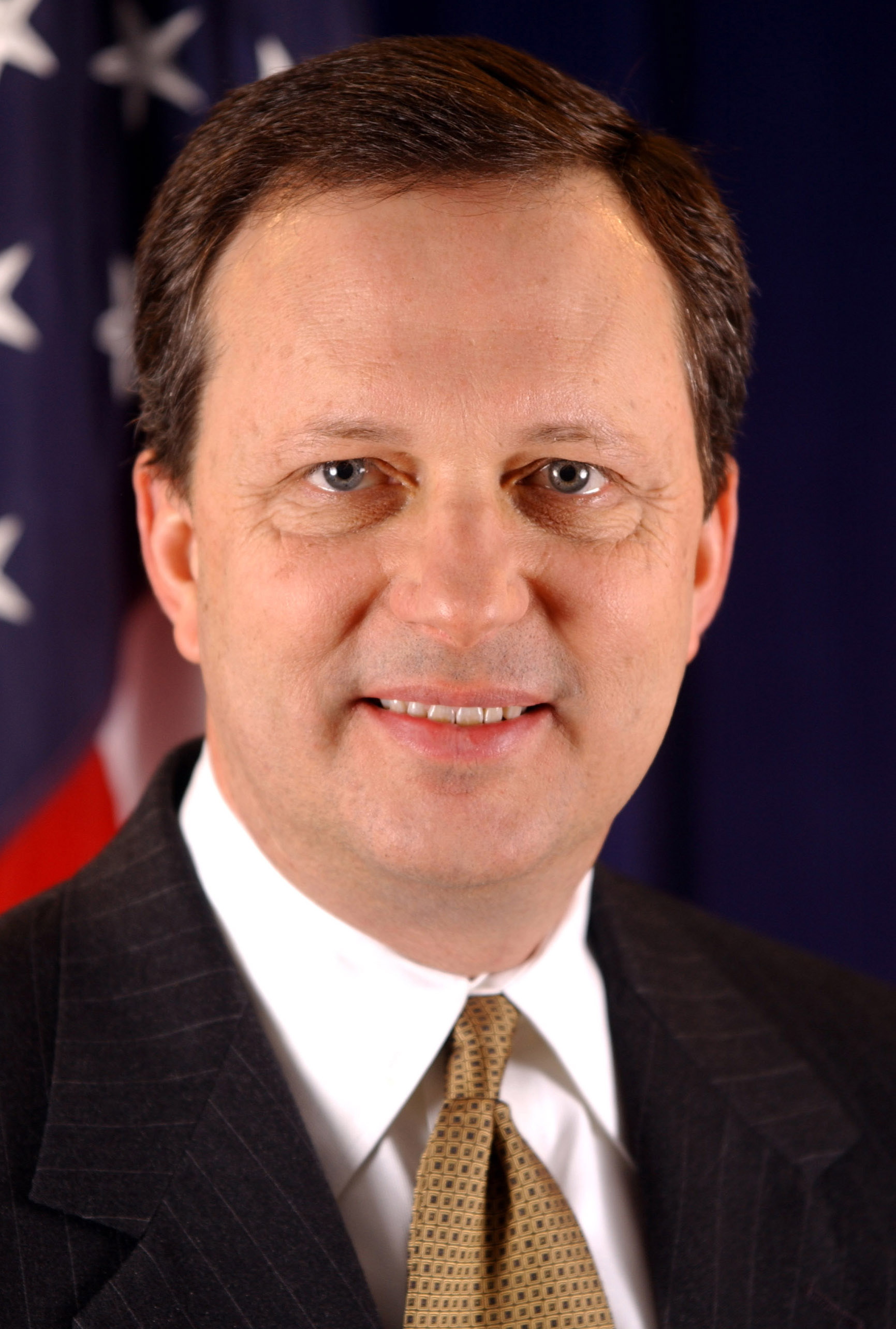
FEMA administrator Michael Brown in 2003.

FEMA Director, Michael Brown, was criticized when he stated that he was not aware there were refugees in the Convention Center until September 1, three days after Hurricane Katrina hit, when Brian Williams, of NBC Nightly News, asked Mr. Brown a question about them live on the Nightly News.

On September 2, CNN's Soledad O'Brien asked FEMA Director Mike Brown, "How is it possible that we're getting better info than you were getting ... we were showing live pictures of the people outside the Convention Center ... also we'd been reporting that officials had been telling people to go to the Convention Center ... I don't understand how FEMA cannot have this information." When pressed, Brown reluctantly admitted he had learned about the starving crowds at the Convention Center from news media reports. O'Brien then said to Brown, "FEMA's been on the ground four days, going into the fifth day, why no massive airdrop of food and water ... in Banda Aceh, Indonesia, they got food drops two days after the tsunami."

Once officials became aware of the conditions at the Convention Center, a small number of basic food supplies were diverted there by helicopter. However, there were no large-scale deliveries until a truck convoy arrived at midday on September 2, with a slow response by authorities, as well as mob attacks on aid arrivals, delaying the provision of relief. Federal officials also underestimated the number of people converging on the convention center. Even as refugees were evacuated, more kept arriving every hour.

Later, members of the press suggested that Michael Brown was not experienced in emergency management when he was appointed to the position by President Bush two years prior to Katrina. Mr. Brown continues to deny these charges. And, in fact, he had limited authority to order federal agencies into action until about 36 hours after the storm hit when Chertoff designated him as the "principal federal official" in charge of the storm. Chertoff was the one with the authority. " " President Bush recognized this and commended Michael Brown and gave him credit for the good work he had done, "Brownie, you're doing a heck of a job. The FEMA Director is working 24 – they're working 24 hours a day."

On September 9, Chertoff recalled Brown to Washington and removed him from the immediate supervision of the Hurricane Katrina relief effort, and replaced him with Vice Admiral Thad W. Allen, chief of staff of the United States Coast Guard. Three days later, on September 12, Brown resigned his position, stating, "As I told the president, it is important that I leave now to avoid further distraction from the ongoing mission of FEMA."

Censorship

On September 6, citing a Defense Department policy banning the photographing of flag-draped coffins of American troops, FEMA representatives stated that they did not want journalists to accompany rescue boats as they went out searching for victims, because, "the recovery of the victims is being treated with dignity and the utmost respect." The agency also asked that no photographs of the dead be published by the media. This policy was met with much criticism by the media, and compared to censorship. On September 9, Army Lt. Gen. Russel L. Honoré, who oversaw the federal relief effort in New Orleans, and Terry Ebbert, Louisiana's homeland security director, said that reporters would have, "zero access," to body recovery operations, a statement which was actually misinterpreted. What was meant by that was that reporters would not be embedded with recovery teams, but would still have free access to any public area in the city. CNN filed a lawsuit regarding the situation, and U.S. District Judge Keith Ellison issued an order preventing officials from blocking media coverage.

Lobbying contracts and FEMA

On September 7, FEMA hired a private disaster relief management company, Kenyon International, to collect bodies. Based in Houston, Texas, Kenyon International specializes in disaster relief and had provided services in previous major disasters worldwide. Authorities understood Kenyon was the only disaster management company capable of handling this kind of large-scale event. Shortly after being hired by FEMA, the State of Louisiana requested Kenyon to work directly for them to complete the work. In 2005, Kenyon International was still a subsidiary of Service Corporation International (SCI). Kenyon received the government contract due to the nature of the incident and their extensive knowledge and previous experience of working mass fatality events. The federal government has been highly criticized for the hiring of Kenyon for several reasons, including the availability of volunteer morticians from in and around New Orleans, the questionable usage of federal funding, the ineffectiveness of the organization in carrying out is duties leaving bodies to be found up to a year after Katrina made landfall, an extensively checkered past that the Bush Administration was aware of and accused of covering-up, and the length of time it took to identify victims once their bodies were recovered.

Recommended charities

FEMA was criticized for giving undue prominence to Operation Blessing International, placing it as #2 on their list of recommended charities right after the American Red Cross. Operation Blessing is a charity founded, and still chaired by, Pat Robertson, the television evangelist.

FEMA Firefighters

When FEMA called for firefighters for "community service and outreach," 2000 highly trained firefighters showed up in a staging area in an Atlanta hotel, believing that their skills would be used, or would better be used, for search and rescue operations. The firefighters, who were all paid by FEMA for their time, found themselves undergoing training on community relations, watching videos, and attending seminars on sexual harassment in a hotel, waiting days, in some cases, to be deployed in a secretarial or public relations position. FEMA defended itself by saying that there was no urgency for the firefighters to arrive because they were primarily going to be involved in community relations work, not search and rescue, and their call for help stated this.

Chertoff ... FEMA was 'overwhelmed'

Testifying before the Senate Committee on Homeland Security and Governmental Affairs, Chertoff said that FEMA was, "overwhelmed," by the scope of the disaster, and acknowledged, "many lapses," in his agency's response to Katrina. Chertoff also disagreed with Michael Brown's earlier testimony that state and local officials were responsible for the slow response to the hurricane, saying that he had experienced no problems in dealing with state and local officials and that Brown had never informed him of any problems.

Barbara Bush

Barbara Bush, wife of former president George H. W. Bush and mother of George W. Bush, generated criticism after comments on hurricane evacuees and a donation. While visiting a Houston relief center for people displaced by Hurricane Katrina, Bush told the radio program Marketplace,

Almost everyone I've talked to says, 'We're gonna move to Houston.' What I'm hearing, which is sort of scary, is they all want to stay in Texas ... Everybody is so overwhelmed by the hospitality, and so many of the people in the arenas here, you know, were underprivileged anyway, so this is working very well for them.

The remarks generated controversy. Later, Barbara Bush also donated money to the Bush-Clinton Katrina Fund, with some of that money being earmarked by her to go to a software company owned by her son, Neil Bush. "Mrs. Bush wanted to do something specifically for education and specifically for the thousands of students flooding into the Houston schools," said Jean Becker, former President Bush's chief of staff. "She knew that HISD was using this software program, and she's very excited about this program, so she wanted to make it possible for them to expand the use of this program."

Since then, the Ignite Learning program has been given to eight area schools that took in substantial numbers of Hurricane Katrina evacuees.

Dennis Hastert

Dennis Hastert, who was the Speaker of the United States House of Representatives at the time, suggested that New Orleans should not be rebuilt, which was a comment he backtracked on.

== U.S. National Guard ==
Governor Kathleen Blanco (D) requested, via a letter to the U.S. National Guard Bureau on August 30, additional National Guard troops from other states to supplement the Louisiana National Guard, but approval did not occur until September 1. New Mexico Governor Bill Richardson had offered assistance to Blanco two days before the storm hit but could not send his troops until approval came from the National Guard Bureau. Blanco later acknowledged that she should have called for more troops sooner and that she should have activated a compact with other states that would have allowed her to bypass the requirement to route the request through the National Guard Bureau.

Some 40% of Louisiana's National Guard was deployed to Iraq at the time, and critics claim that use of the National Guard to boost troop numbers in Iraq left them unready to handle disasters at home.

Thousands of National Guard and federal troops were mobilized and sent to Louisiana, with 7,841 in the area on August 29, to a maximum of 46,838 on September 10. A number of local law enforcement agents from across the country were temporarily deputized by the state.

They have M16s and are locked and loaded. These troops know how to shoot and kill and I expect they will.

— Governor Kathleen Blanco, September 2, 2005

== State and local government ==
=== Louisiana ===
Chief among those criticisms is that state National Guard troops, under the command of Governor Blanco, were responsible for quelling civil unrest in advance of humanitarian relief efforts, yet they failed to do so in the first few days after the hurricane.

Notably, federal troops are generally prohibited from directly enforcing state laws (e.g., controlling looting or riots) by the Posse Comitatus Act, with some exceptions. The President can assume command of state troops under the Stafford Act, but in this "federalized", or "Title 10" status, the federalized National Guard troops become unable to enforce laws directly, just like other federal troops. However, the Posse Comitatus Act does not apply to National Guard troops under the command of a state governor.

Shortly before midnight on Friday, September 2, the Bush administration sent Governor Blanco a request to take over command of law enforcement under the Insurrection Act (one of the exceptions to the Posse Comitatus Act), but she rejected it. Governor Haley Barbour of Mississippi also rejected a similar request.

Governor Blanco did make a request to the Federal government for additional National Guard troops (to be under her command) to supplement the 5,700 Louisiana National Guard troops available in Louisiana at the time. However, the necessary formal request through the federal National Guard Bureau was not made until Wednesday, a full two days after the hurricane hit and when much of the city was already underwater; Blanco explained that she didn't understand specific types and numbers of troops needed to be requested. By comparison, on September 2, when Louisiana had only a few hundred National Guardsmen from other states, Mississippi's National Guard reports having "almost division strength (about 10,000 troops)" from other states' National Guards. Blanco also failed to activate a compact with other states that would have allowed her to bypass the National Guard Bureau in a request for additional troops.

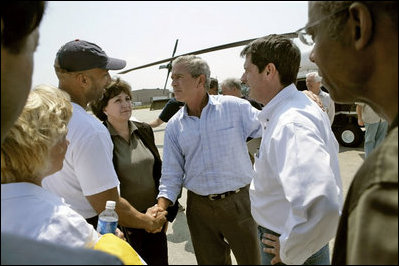
Mayor Ray Nagin, Governor Kathleen Blanco, President Bush, and Senator David Vitter on September 2, 2005

Within the United States and as delineated in the National Response Plan, response and planning is first and foremost a local government responsibility. When local government exhausts its resources, it then requests specific additional resources from the county level. The request process proceeds similarly from the county to the state to the federal government as additional resource needs are identified. Many of the problems that arose developed from inadequate planning and backup communications systems at various levels. One example of this is that the City of New Orleans attempted to manage the disaster from a hotel ballroom with inadequate backup communications plans instead of a properly staffed Emergency Operations Center. When phone service failed, they had difficulty communicating their specific needs to the state EOC in Baton Rouge.

Press reports indicate that there were other failures at the state and local level in expediting aid and social services to the stricken area. Referring again to the federalization of the National Guard, New Orleans Mayor Ray Nagin accused the governor of delaying federal rescue efforts, "I was ready to move today. The governor said she needed 24 hours to make a decision. It would have been great if we could have ... told the world that we had this all worked out. It didn't happen, and more people died." A FEMA official claimed that Governor Blanco failed to submit a request for help in a timely manner, saying that she did send President Bush a request asking for shelter and provisions but didn't specifically ask for help with evacuations. The nonpartisan Congressional Research Service concluded that Blanco did submit requests for shelter, counseling, and provisions in a timely manner, but there was no mention that she requested assistance with evacuation. One aide to the governor said that Blanco thought city officials were taking care of the evacuation in accord with the city's emergency plan.

There were reports that Governor Blanco was reluctant to issue a mandatory evacuation order until President Bush called to personally ask that she do so. However, the mandatory evacuation order was issued by Mayor Nagin and, as the White House reconfirmed the timeline, it is unlikely the Bush call was decisive in the making of the order. At the August 28 press conference in which Nagin and Blanco ordered the evacuation of New Orleans, Blanco actually said that Bush had called "just before we walked into this room" to share his concerns and urge that the city be evacuated.

William J. Jefferson (D-Louisiana) a Representative for Louisiana from the New Orleans area, was criticized when he had misused National Guard resources to check on his personal belongings and property on September 2, during the height of the rescue efforts. He used his political position to bypass military barricades and delay two heavy trucks, a helicopter, and several National Guard troops for over an hour to stop at his home and retrieve, "a laptop computer, three suitcases, and a box about the size of a small refrigerator".

=== City and local response ===
Many have also criticized the local and state governments, who have primary responsibility for local disasters, including both Governor Blanco and Mayor Nagin. Mayor Nagin was criticized for allegedly failing to execute the New Orleans disaster plan, which called for the use of the city's school buses in evacuating residents unable to leave on their own. The city never deployed the buses, which were subsequently destroyed in the flooding.

On Saturday, August 27, several hours after the last regularly scheduled train left New Orleans, Amtrak ran a special train to move equipment out of the city. The train had room for several hundred passengers, and Amtrak offered these spaces to the city, but the city declined them, so the train left New Orleans at 8:30 p.m., with no passengers on board.

Governor Blanco has said that, following the storm's landfall, FEMA asked that school buses not be used for post-storm evacuation because they were not air-conditioned, leading to the potential risk of causing heatstroke, and that FEMA had informed them of more suitable buses that they would be providing. Concerned over the slow reaction, Blanco sent in the state's fleet of 500 buses to aid in the evacuation process. It was not until late on August 31 that Blanco learned that the FEMA buses were being sent from outside the state and could not arrive in time.

Conditions amidst the aftermath of the storm worsened and included violent crimes, shootings, and lootings. President Bush said that saving lives should come first, but he and the local New Orleans Government also stated that they will have zero tolerance for looters. White House Press Secretary Scott McClellan affirmed that looters should not be allowed to take food, water, or shoes, that they should get those things through some other way. Governor Blanco warned that troops had orders to shoot to kill, saying, "These troops are fresh back from Iraq, well trained, experienced, battle-tested and under my orders to restore order in the streets. ... They have M-16s and they are locked and loaded. These troops know how to shoot and kill and they are more than willing to do so if necessary and I expect they will."

The convention center conditions were described as appalling, having become surrounded by refuse, human feces, and even corpses. The downtown Charity Hospital had a number of critically ill patients die as a result of delays in evacuations. The flooding of New Orleans occurred after the worst of Hurricane Katrina's fury had been spent and the storm itself moved further north. The destruction wrought by Katrina, and the flooding thereafter, severely damaged the roads and other infrastructure needed to deliver relief.

Officers from the Jefferson Parish Sheriff's Office, the Gretna City Police Department, and the Crescent City Connection Police blocked the Crescent City Connection to block evacuees crossing the Mississippi River from New Orleans into their area. Gretna Police Chief Arthur Lawson told UPI, "There was no food, water or shelter in Gretna City. We did not have the wherewithal to deal with these people. If we had opened the bridge, our city would have looked like New Orleans does now - looted, burned, and pillaged."

Later, an independent investigation of the pre-Katrina levees that protect New Orleans, alleged that the Levee Board had mismanaged funds and also, "paid more attention to marinas, gambling and business than to maintaining the levees.

==== Confiscation of civilian firearms ====
Controversy arose over a September 8 city-wide order by New Orleans Police Superintendent Eddie Compass to local police, U.S. Army National Guard soldiers, and Deputy U.S. Marshals to confiscate all civilian-held firearms. "No one will be able to be armed," Compass said. "Guns will be taken. Only law enforcement will be allowed to have guns." Seizures were carried out without a warrant, and in some cases with excessive force; one instance captured on film involved 58‑year‑old New Orleans resident Patricia Konie. Konie stayed behind, in her well-provisioned home, and had an old revolver for protection. A group of police entered the house, and when she refused to surrender her revolver, she was tackled and it was removed by force. Konnie's shoulder was fractured, and she was taken into police custody for failing to surrender her firearm.

Angered civilians, backed by the National Rifle Association and other organizations, filed protests over the constitutionality of such an order and the difficulty in tracking seizures, as the paperwork was rarely filed during the searches. Wayne LaPierre, CEO of the National Rifle Association, defended the right of affected civilians to retain firearms, saying that, "What we've seen in Louisiana - the breakdown of law and order in the aftermath of disaster - is exactly the kind of situation where the Second Amendment was intended to allow citizens to protect themselves." The searches received little news coverage, though reaction from groups such as the NRA, the Second Amendment Foundation, and Gun Owners of America was immediate and heated, and a lawsuit was filed September 22 by the NRA and SAF on behalf of two firearm owners whose firearms were seized. On September 23, the U.S. District Court for the Eastern District of Louisiana issued a restraining order to bar further firearms confiscations.

After refusing to admit that it had any seized firearms, the city revealed in mid-March that it did have a cache of some 1000 firearms seized after the hurricane; this disclosure came after the NRA filed a motion in court to hold the city in contempt for failure to comply with the U.S. District Court's earlier order to return all seized firearms. On April 14, 2006, it was announced that the city will begin to return seized firearms, however as of late 2008, many firearms were still in police possession, and the matter was still in court. The matter was finally settled in favor of the NRA in October 2008. Per the agreement, the city was required to relax the strict proof of ownership requirements previously used and was to release firearms to their owners with an affidavit claiming ownership and a background check to verify that the owner is legally able to possess a firearm.

Louisiana legislator Steve Scalise introduced Louisiana House Bill 760, which would prohibit the confiscation of firearms in a state of emergency, unless the seizure is pursuant to the investigation of a crime, or if the seizure is necessary to prevent immediate harm to the officer or another individual. On June 8, 2006, HB 760 was signed into law. 21 other states joined Louisiana in enacting similar laws. A federal law prohibiting the seizure of lawfully held firearms during an emergency, the Disaster Recovery Personal Protection Act of 2006, passed in the House with a vote of 322 to 99, and in the Senate by 84-16. The bill was signed into law by President Bush on October 9, 2006.

== International criticism ==
Several foreign leaders have expressed frustration that they couldn't get a go-ahead from the Bush administration to administer help. Bush said on the ABC News program Good Morning America that the United States could fend for itself, "I do expect a lot of sympathies and perhaps some will send cash dollars," Bush said of foreign governments.

The immediate response from many nations was to ask to be allowed to send in self-sustaining search and rescue teams to assist in evacuating those remaining in the city. The first to respond was Venezuela, offering tons of food, water, and a million barrels of extra petroleum. France had a range of aircraft, two naval ships, and a hospital ship standing ready in the Caribbean. Russia offered four jets with rescuers, equipment, food, and medicine, but their help was first declined before later being accepted. Germany had offered airlifting, vaccination, water purification, medical supplies including German air force hospital planes, emergency electrical power, and pumping services; their offer was noted and they received a formal request three days later. Similarly, Sweden had been waiting for a formal request to send a military cargo plane with three complete GSM systems, water sanitation equipment, and experts. The Netherlands offered help out of the island Aruba in the Caribbean Sea. Cuba offered to send 1,586 doctors and 26 tons of medicine but this offer was rejected.

British Deputy Prime Minister John Prescott linked the global warming issue to Katrina, criticizing the United States' lack of support for the Kyoto Protocol, "The horrific flood of New Orleans brings home to us the concern of leaders of countries like the Maldives, whose nations are at risk of disappearing completely. There has been resistance by the US government to Kyoto - which I believe is wrong." Ted Sluijter, press spokesman for Neeltje Jans, the public park where the Delta Works are located, said, "I don't want to sound overly critical, but it's hard to imagine that (the damage caused by Katrina) could happen in a Western country, It seemed like plans for protection and evacuation weren't really in place, and once it happened, the coordination was poor."

In China, the People's Daily, criticized President Bush's handling of the crisis, calling the slow response time to the unfolding events, "negligence of duty".

An article in the April 29, 2007, Washington Post claimed that of the $854 million offered by foreign countries, whom the article dubs "allies," to the US Government, only $40 million of the funds had been spent "for disaster victims or reconstruction" as of the date of publication (less than 5%).

Additionally, a large portion of the $854 million in aid offered went uncollected, including over $400 million in oil (almost 50%).

== House of Representatives report ==
The U.S. House of Representatives created the Select Bipartisan Committee to Investigate the Preparation for and Response to Hurricane Katrina. On February 15, 2006, they released their final report.

The Executive Summary states (among other things) the following:

- "The Select Committee identified failures at all levels of government that significantly undermined and detracted from the heroic efforts of first responders, private individuals and organizations, faith-based groups, and others."
- "The Select Committee believes Katrina was primarily a failure of the initiative."
- "The failure of local, state, and federal governments to respond more effectively to Katrina — which had been predicted in theory for many years, and forecast with startling accuracy for five days — demonstrates that whatever improvements have been made to our capacity to respond to natural or man-made disasters, four and half years after 9/11, we are still not fully prepared. Local first responders were largely overwhelmed and unable to perform their duties, and the National Response Plan did not adequately provide a way for federal assets to quickly supplement or, if necessary, supplant first responders."

== Social issues ==
=== Vulnerability of the poorest residents ===
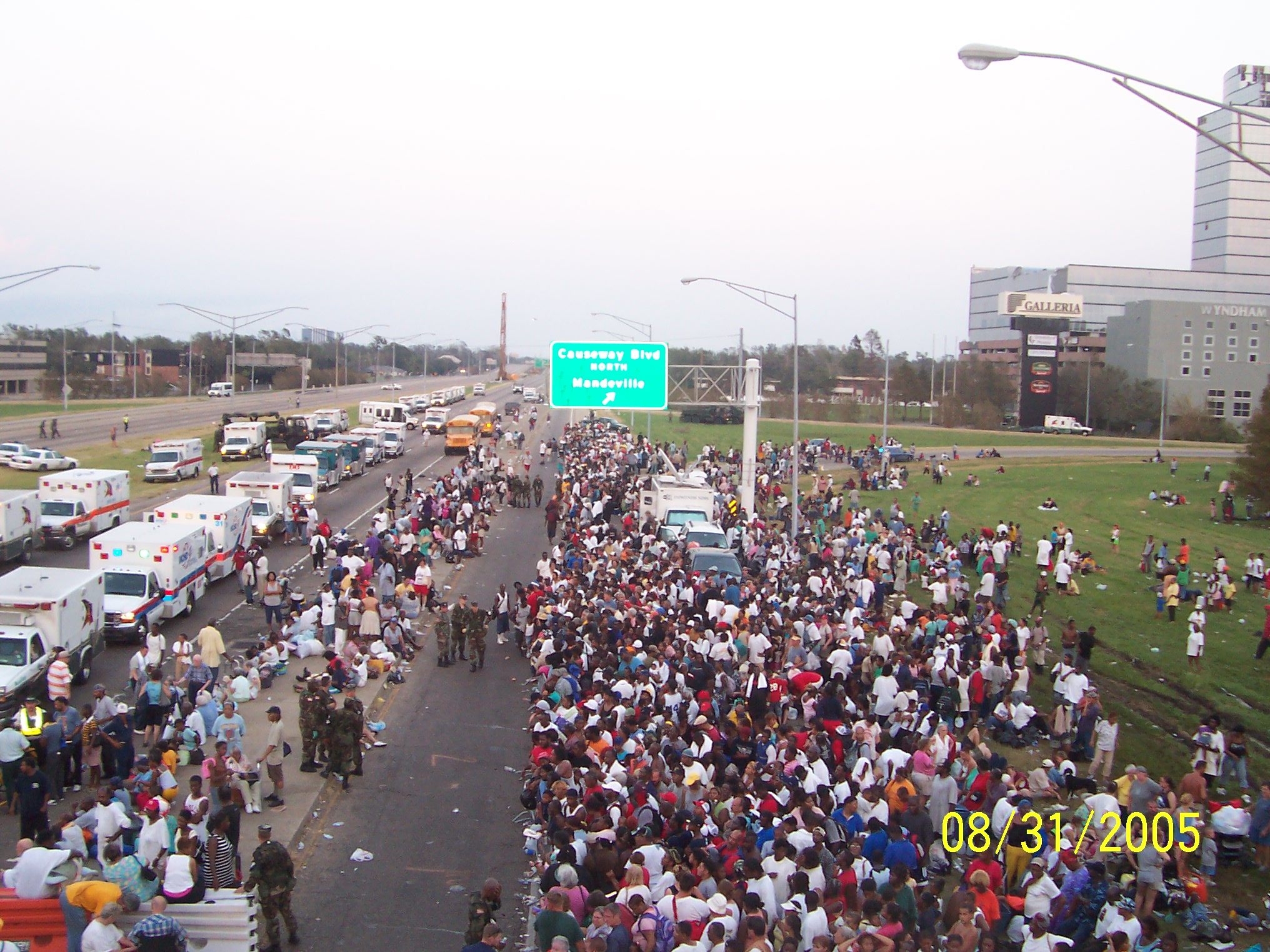
Displaced New Orleans residents at an Interstate 10 exit. August 31, 2005.

African-American leaders and others have expressed outrage at what they see as the apparent neglect of the poor and/or black residents of the affected region. Two-thirds of the residents of New Orleans are black, primarily attributed to decades of white flight. In addition, New Orleans is one of America's poorest cities, with more than 25% of residents and 40% of children living at or below the poverty line. Within the city itself, the poorest, who are mostly African-American, tended to live in the lowest parts that are most vulnerable to flooding.

98% of residents in the Lower Ninth Ward, which was flooded by a catastrophic breach in the nearby Industrial Canal, are black, and more than a third live in poverty. Many of the poor depend on welfare, Social Security, or other public assistance checks, which they receive on the first of each month, meaning that Hurricane Katrina made landfall just when many of the poor had exhausted their resources. Thus, many of the city's poor simply couldn't afford to flee the city before the hurricane struck.

Speaking at a press conference from a relief center in Lafayette, First Lady Laura Bush explained that the poor are always the main victims of natural disasters. "This is what happens when there's a natural disaster of this scope," Mrs. Bush said. "The poorer people are usually in the neighborhoods that are the lowest or the most exposed or the most vulnerable. Their housing is the most vulnerable to a natural disaster. And that is just always what happens."

Reverend Jesse Jackson criticized the President and asked why he has not named African-Americans to top positions in the federal response to the disaster, particularly when the majority of victims remaining stranded in New Orleans were black: "How can blacks be locked out of the leadership, and trapped in the suffering? It is that lack of sensitivity and compassion that represents a kind of incompetence."

Fifty-one percent of Louisiana residents who were killed by Hurricane Katrina were black; 49% of victims were 75 years old or older. However, for some demographic groups in Orleans Parish (New Orleans), the death rate for African-Americans was 1.7-4 times higher than for whites; as a whole in Orleans parish, 68% of deaths (459 out of 680 total) were black people, almost exactly the same percentage of the population there as that found in the 2000 U.S. Census (which recorded 67%). Areas of the city where the largest number of dead were found were low-lying, flood-prone areas with predominantly black populations.

=== Race as a factor in the slow response ===
In a survey conducted of 680 evacuees taken to various shelters in the Houston area, a vast number of respondents, a full 70%, faulted President George W. Bush and the Federal Government for their handling of the problem, while 58% and 53% blamed Governor Blanco and Mayor Nagin, respectively. Sixty-eight percent felt the response would have been quicker if those trapped had been white and wealthier and 61% indicated that they felt the government did not care about them. Ninety-three percent of the respondents were African-Americans.

Reverend Jesse Jackson claimed that racism was a factor in the slow government response, stating that "many black people feel that their race, their property conditions and their voting patterns have been a factor in the response."

Commentator Lou Dobbs of CNN has claimed that local officials should bear some responsibility, saying that "the city of New Orleans is 70% black, its mayor is black, its principal power structure is black, and if there is a failure to the black Americans, who live in poverty and in the city of New Orleans, those officials have to bear much of the responsibility."

Former Mayor of Atlanta and UN Ambassador Andrew Young, who was born in New Orleans, had a more nuanced reaction to the disaster: "I was surprised and not surprised. It's not just a lack of preparedness. I think the easy answer is to say that these are poor people and black people and so the government doesn't give a damn ... there might be some truth to that. But I think we've got to see this as a serious problem of the long-term neglect of an environmental system on which our nation depends."

People began taking advantage of the abandoned stores. Some claim that the media referred to African Americans as "looters" while white victims were labeled "survivors" and "victims".

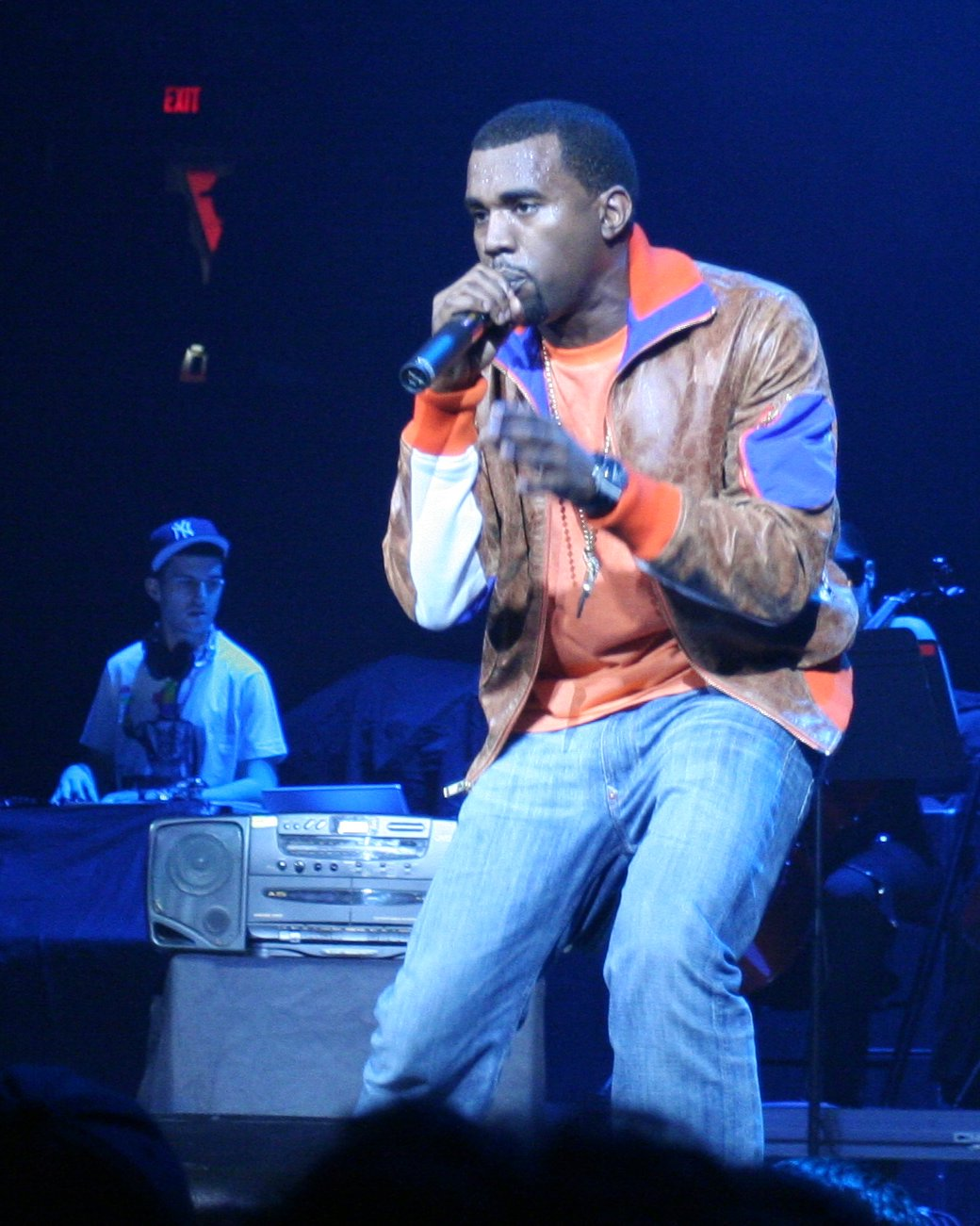
Rapper Kanye West criticized President George W. Bush during A Concert For Hurricane Relief.

On September 2, 2005, during a benefit concert for Hurricane Katrina relief on NBC, A Concert for Hurricane Relief, rapper Kanye West was a featured speaker. Controversy arose when West was presenting, as he deviated from the prepared script, criticizing the slow federal response. Actor Mike Myers, with whom West was paired to present, spoke next and continued to read the script. Once it was West's turn to speak again, he said "George Bush doesn't care about black people." At this point, telethon producer Rick Kaplan cut off the microphone and then cut away to Chris Tucker, who was unaware of the cut for a few seconds. Still, West's comment reached much of the United States. West also went on to say that America has been set to help the poor as slow as possible.

I hate the way they portray us in the media. You see a black family, it says, 'They're looting.' You see a white family, it says, 'They're looking for food.' And, you know, it's been five days [waiting for federal help] because most of the people are black. And even for me to complain about it, I would be a hypocrite because I've tried to turn away from the TV because it's too hard to watch. I've even been shopping before even giving a donation, so now I'm calling my business manager right now to see what is the biggest amount I can give, and just to imagine if I was down there, and those are my people down there. So anybody out there that wants to do anything that we can help—with the way America is set up to help the poor, the black people, the less well-off, as slow as possible. I mean, the Red Cross is doing everything they can. We already realize a lot of people that could help are at war right now, fighting another way—and they've given them permission to go down and shoot us! George Bush doesn't care about black people.

— Kanye West, A Concert for Hurricane Relief

Some argue that authorities do not want the poor black community returning to the city in an act to make the city more white.

All around, FEMA response was found to be slow and unfair. A study conducted by graduate students at The University of Connecticut's Department of Public Policy found that FEMA trailers were offered 63% in St. Bernard Parish, a predominantly white area, and 13% in the Lower Ninth Ward, a predominantly black neighborhood.

=== Lack of provision for people with disabilities ===
Disaster planners were criticized for failing to take the needs of people with disabilities into consideration. Transportation, communication and shelters did not make provision for people with mobility, cognitive or communication disabilities. Cases were reported of wheelchair users being left behind, no provision being made for guide dogs, and essential equipment and medication not being available or left behind. Disability advocacy organizations criticized local, state and federal emergency authorities for not including disabled people in their planning and consultation. The National Organization on Disability assessed the post-Katrina situation of evacuees with disabilities: the "Special Needs for Katrina Evacuees Project" research results were submitted to Congress in two briefings.

=== Characterization of displaced persons as "refugees" ===
Various media agencies were criticized for using the word "refugee" to describe someone that was displaced by Hurricane Katrina. Many, particularly African-Americans, have argued that using the term "refugee" implies a sort of "second class" status, while others have argued that using terms such as "evacuees" or "displaced" is too clinical and not dramatic enough to portray the current situation.

U.S. President Bush addressed the issue, stating: "The people we're talking about are not refugees. They are Americans and they need the help and love and compassion of our fellow citizens."

Accordingly, most major media outlets in the U.S. eliminated the usage of "refugees", with a few exceptions.

== Discrimination against non-U.S. citizens ==
There was some criticism by tourists that rescue crews were giving preferential treatment to American citizens. For example, some British tourists trapped in a New Orleans hotel accused the authorities of preferential treatment for Americans during the evacuation as Katrina approached. Australian tourists reported a similar experience, compounded by the federal government's refusal to admit consular officers to the New Orleans area and failure to notify the Australian embassy that one missing tourist was in a correctional facility on minor charges. South African tourists also reported that tourist buses were commandeered by federal officials, and the tourists told to walk. Later on, they were driven back by warning shots after waiting near a bridge blocked by armed forces.

In the days before the storm, Mayor Nagin was particularly blunt in regards to foreign tourists, stating, "The only thing I can say to them is I hope they have a hotel room, and it's a least on the third floor and up. Unfortunately, unless they can rent a car to get out of town, which I doubt they can at this point, they're probably in the position of riding the storm out." Hotel managers also criticized the treatment of tourists, with one noting they were treated worse than the people in the Superdome.

== See also ==
- 2005 levee failures in Greater New Orleans
- Hurricane Maria death toll controversy
- Bankruptcy Abuse Prevention and Consumer Protection Act of 2005
- Chocolate City speech
- Cuba Emergency Response System
- Seabrook Floodgate
- U.S. Army Corps of Engineers civil works controversies (New Orleans)
- Criticism of the government response to Hurricane Ian
