= Arthur Lawson =

Arthur Lawson may refer to:

- Arthur Lawson (police officer), chief of police of the Louisiana city of Gretna
- Arthur Lawson (designer) (1908–1970), British art director
