= A Concert for Hurricane Relief =

2005 benefit concert

A Concert for Hurricane Relief was an hour-long, celebrity-driven benefit concert broadcast live on September 2, 2005. Sponsored by the NBC Universal Television Group, its purpose was to raise money, relief, and awareness in response to the loss of life and human suffering that resulted from Hurricane Katrina in five southeastern states in the United States that same year. Hosted by Matt Lauer, it was simulcast from the New York studios of NBC located at 30 Rockefeller Plaza, New York City, on NBC, MSNBC, CNBC, and i: Independent Television. Controversy was sparked during a segment featuring Mike Myers and Kanye West, where West criticized the Bush administration's response to Hurricane Katrina saying, "George Bush doesn't care about black people."

Viewers were encouraged to donate to the American Red Cross Disaster Relief Fund by calling the number 1-800-HELP-NOW or through the Red Cross's website. The benefit generated $50 million and was watched on television by approximately 8.5 million viewers.

== Presenters ==
- Matt Lauer – Host
- Hilary Swank
- Richard Gere
- Eriq La Salle
- Lindsay Lohan
- Mike Myers
- Kanye West
- Chris Tucker
- Marcia Gay Harden
- Claire Danes
- Leonardo DiCaprio

== Performances ==
Artist(s)	Song(s)
Harry Connick, Jr. (piano); Wynton Marsalis (trumpet); Victor Goines (clarinet); Lucien Barbarin (trombone); Charles Neville (sax)	"Bourbon Street Parade"
Tim McGraw	"More Power to Ya" "Something Like That"
Faith Hill	Spoken piece "There Will Come a Day"
Aaron Neville	"Louisiana 1927"
Joe Scarborough	Spoken piece
Harry Connick Jr. (piano/voice); Wynton Marsalis (trumpet)	Spoken piece (Connick, Jr.) "Do You Know What It Means to Miss New Orleans" (Connick, Jr. & Marsalis)
Aaron Neville	"Amazing Grace"
Jimmy Smits	Spoken piece
Brian Williams	Spoken piece
Whole cast	"When the Saints Go Marching In"

== Harry Connick Jr. ==
A Concert for Hurricane Relief, was hastily pulled together after New Orleans native musician Harry Connick Jr. called NBC Universal chairman and CEO Bob Wright personally to offer his services and encourage the network to embrace relief efforts.

Connick's voice was hoarse when he performed at the benefit, as he had been on the air several times live from New Orleans in the past few days trying to raise awareness of all the help the city, and the people there, needed.

== Kanye West controversy ==
The concert garnered controversy after Kanye West made unscripted comments regarding President George W. Bush and the portrayal of black people in media during a presentation segment. While West and Mike Myers were presenting, West deviated from the prepared script after purportedly telling Myers "I'm going to ad-lib a little bit," then telling co-presenter Chris Tucker, "Get ready for live TV." Myers began with, "With the breach of three levees protecting New Orleans, the landscape of the city has changed dramatically, tragically and perhaps irreversibly. There is now over 25 feet of water where there was once city streets and thriving neighborhoods." West followed this with his deviation from the script:

"I hate the way they portray us in the media. You see a black family, it says, 'They're looting.' You see a white family, it says, 'They're looking for food.' And, you know, it's been five days [waiting for federal help] because most of the people are black. And even for me to complain about it, I would be a hypocrite because I've tried to turn away from the TV because it's too hard to watch. I've even been shopping before even giving a donation, so now I'm calling my business manager right now to see what is the biggest amount I can give, and just to imagine if I was down there, and those are my people down there. So anybody out there that wants to do anything that we can help—with the way America is set up to help the poor, the black people, the less well-off, as slow as possible. I mean, the Red Cross is doing everything they can. We already realize a lot of people that could help are at war right now, fighting another way—and they've given them permission to go down and shoot us!"

Mike Myers, with whom West was paired to present, spoke next and continued as normal by reading the script. West followed this, saying:

"George Bush doesn't care about black people."

Myers turned, surprised and "a bit uncomfortable" by the comment. West revealed later that Myers said to him after, “It is what it is.” The camera then cut away to the next segment, which featured Chris Tucker, who was also visibly surprised.

West later appeared on The Ellen DeGeneres Show, commenting on the controversy, saying, "People have lost their lives, lost their families. It's the least I could do to go up there and say something from my heart, to say something that's real." NBC said in a statement regarding West's comments, "Kanye West departed from the scripted comments that were prepared for him, and his opinions in no way represent the views of the networks. It would be most unfortunate if the efforts of the artists who participated tonight and the generosity of millions of Americans who are helping those in need are overshadowed by one person's opinion."

West returned to NBC one month later, performing on Saturday Night Live's 31st season premiere in October 2005. Mike Myers appeared in a sketch spoofing the incident during that episode.

In a 2010 interview with Bush, who was being interviewed by Matt Lauer to promote his book Decision Points, Bush stated that West's statements were one of the "most disgusting moments of [his] presidency", and that "[his] record was strong, [he] felt, when it came to race relations and giving people a chance. And [West's outburst] was a disgusting moment."

In a 2014 interview with GQ, Myers said, "[Why was] the emphasis on the look on my face versus the fact that somebody spoke truth to power at a time when somebody needed to speak? I'm very proud to have been next to him."

== Auction ==
A Gibson guitar autographed by the performers and presenters was auctioned off to raise additional funds. The guitar sold for $30,900.

== See also ==
- List of highest-grossing benefit concerts
