= International response to Hurricane Katrina =

Many countries and international organizations offered the United States relief aid in the wake of Hurricane Katrina.

According to the European Commission, six days after the disaster, on September 4, 2005, the United States officially asked the European Union for emergency help, asking for blankets, emergency medical kits, water and 500,000 food rations for victims. Help proposed by EU member states was coordinated through their crisis center. The British presidency of the EU functioned as contact with the U.S.

Other countries not on this list also offered aid, but the State Department mentioned that they (the State Department) had not been asked. Later, the U.S. State Department said all offers were being examined.

== Pledges and donations from countries ==
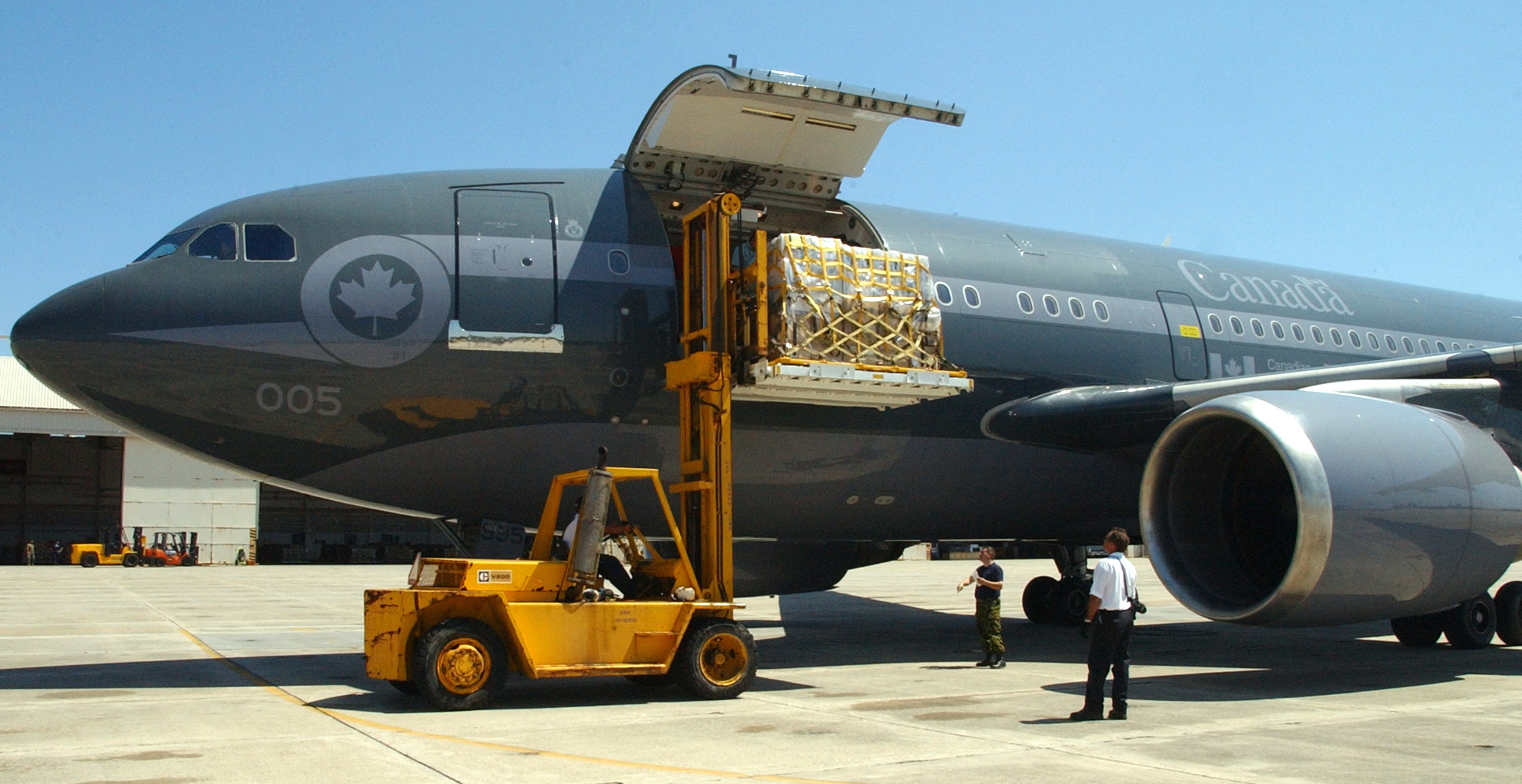
United States Navy personnel unload Canadian relief supplies from a Royal Canadian Air Force transport aircraft in Pensacola, Florida.

Below is a list of countries who offered aid. Some of these efforts were not formally accepted by the U.S. government (see "Actual Funds Used" below).

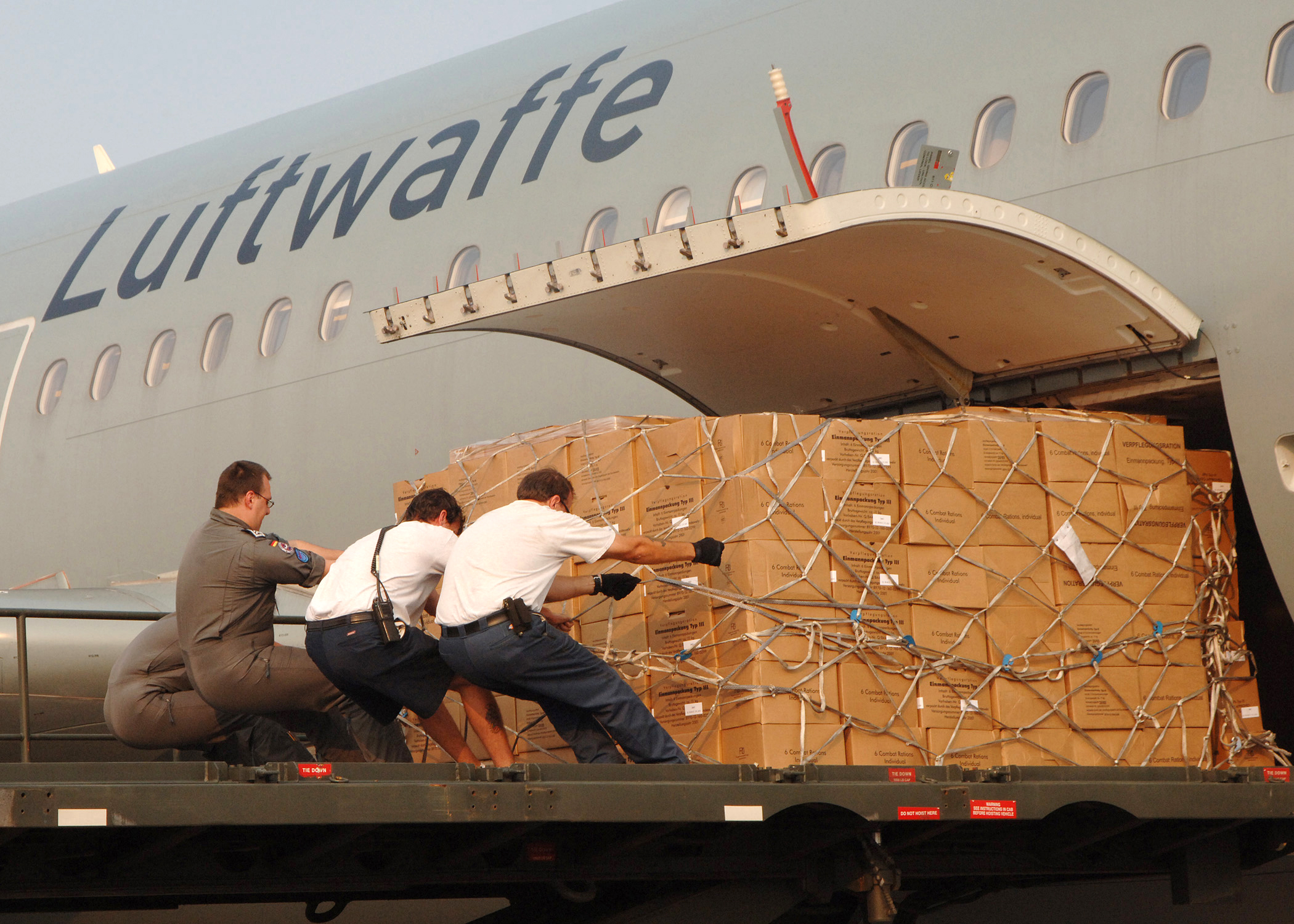
Crew members of a German Air Force Airbus A310 MRTT aircraft offload Meals Ready-to-Eat (MRE) on board Naval Air Station Pensacola, Fla., in support of Hurricane Katrina relief efforts

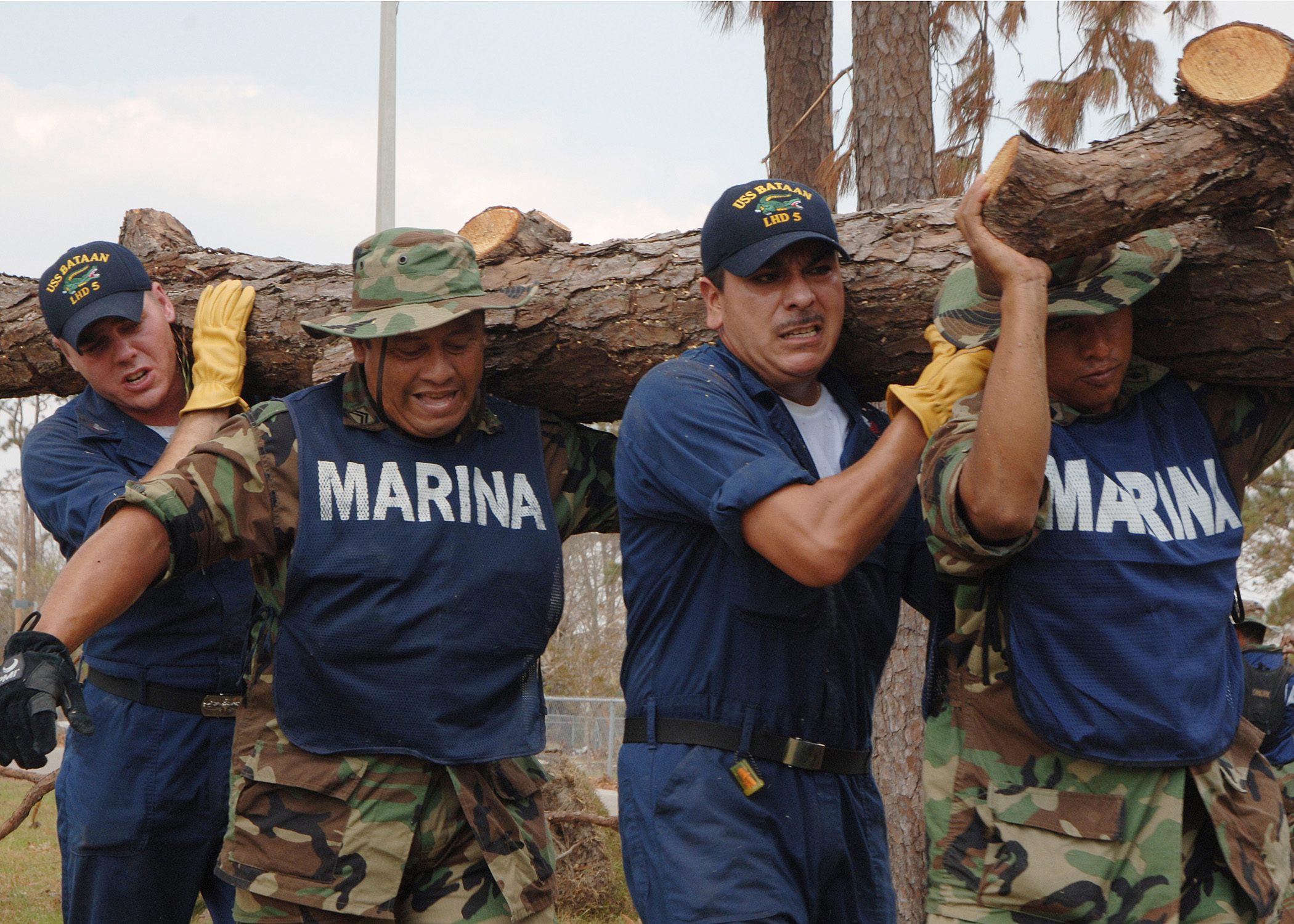
Mexican marines and U.S. Navy sailors cleaning up debris outside of a hurricane-stricken Mississippian elementary school in September 2005.

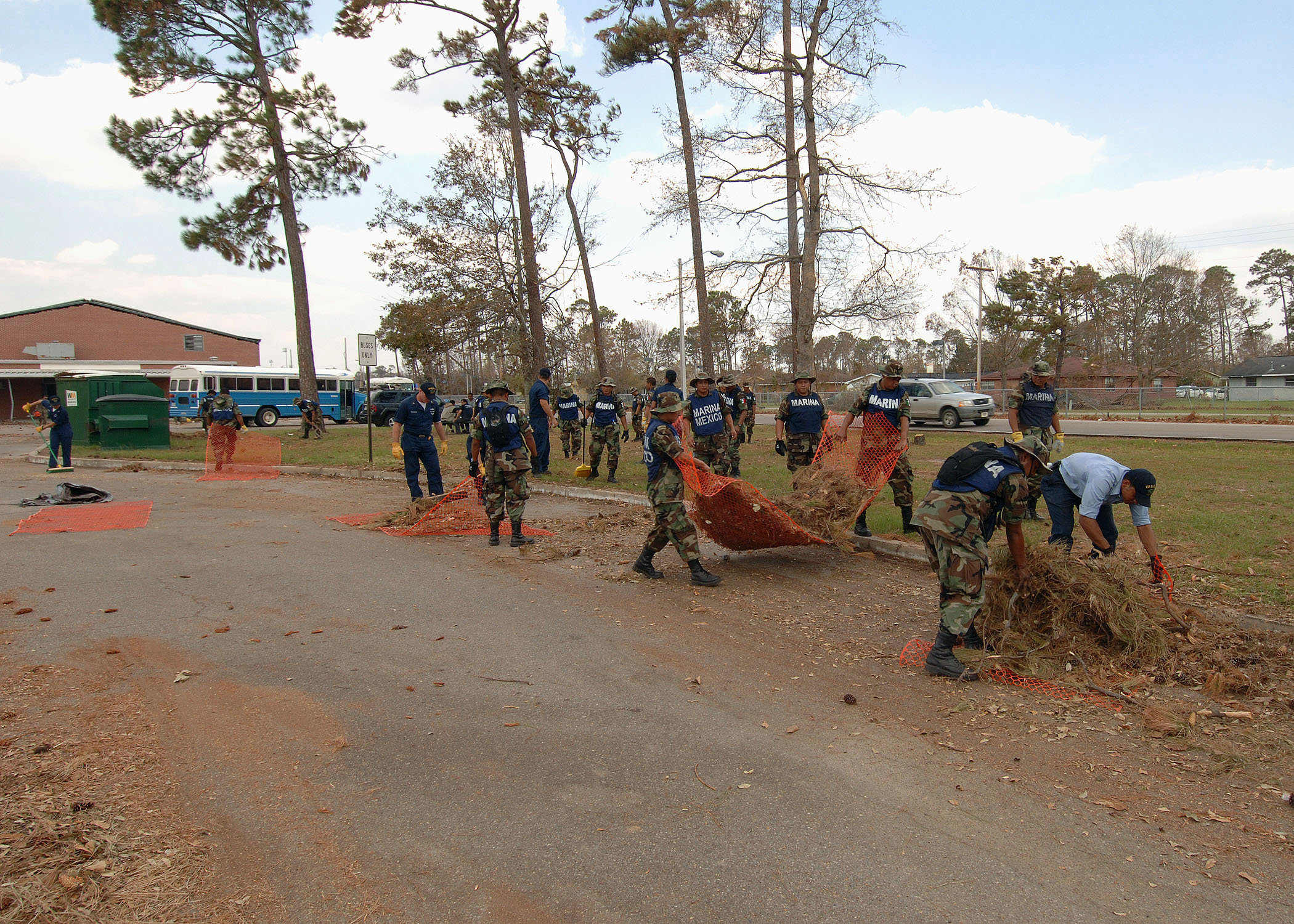
Mexican marines and U.S. Navy sailors cleaning up hurricane debris outside of a Mississippian elementary school.

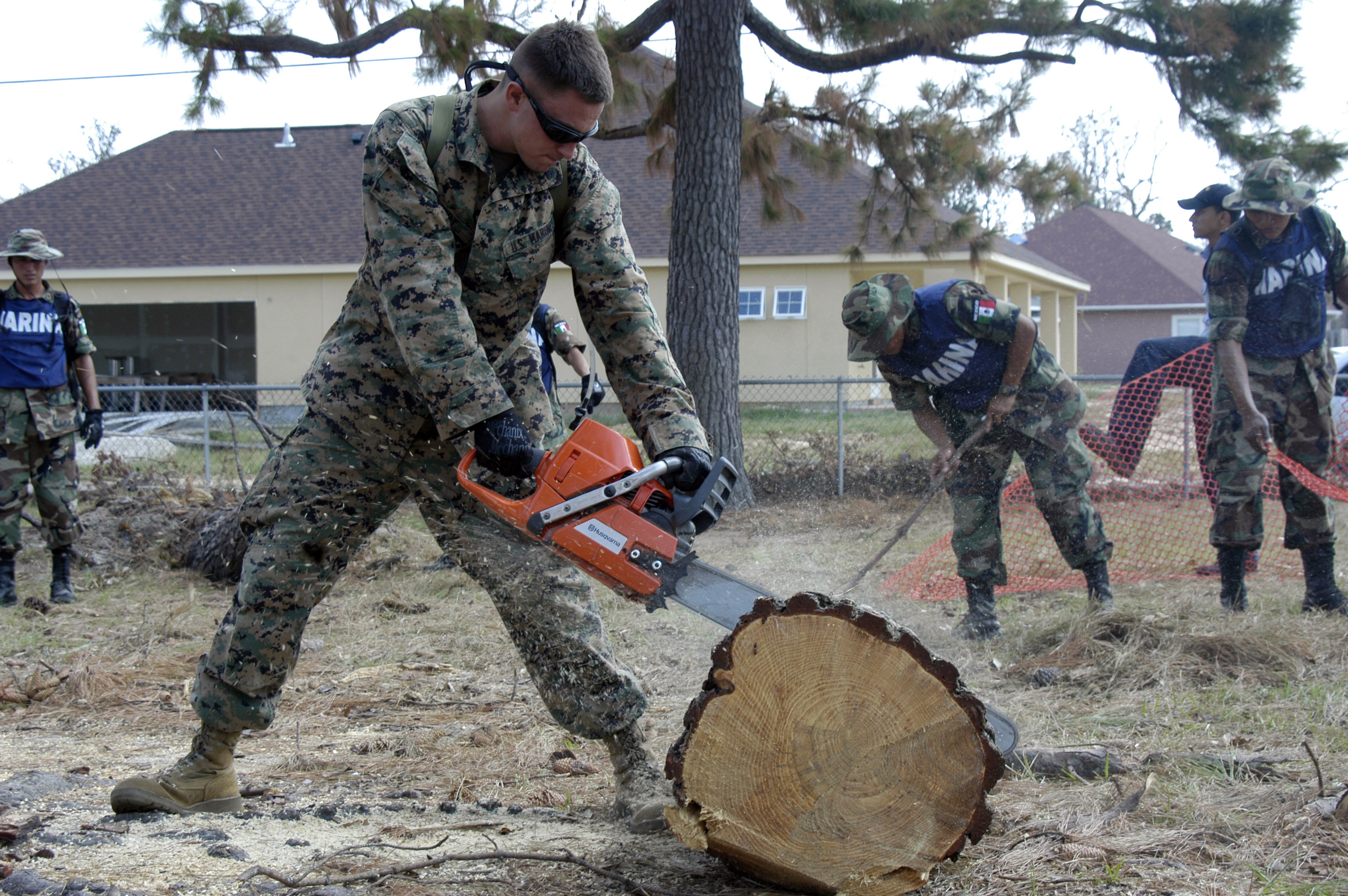
Mexican marines and U.S. Marines cleaning up hurricane debris outside of a Mississippian elementary school.

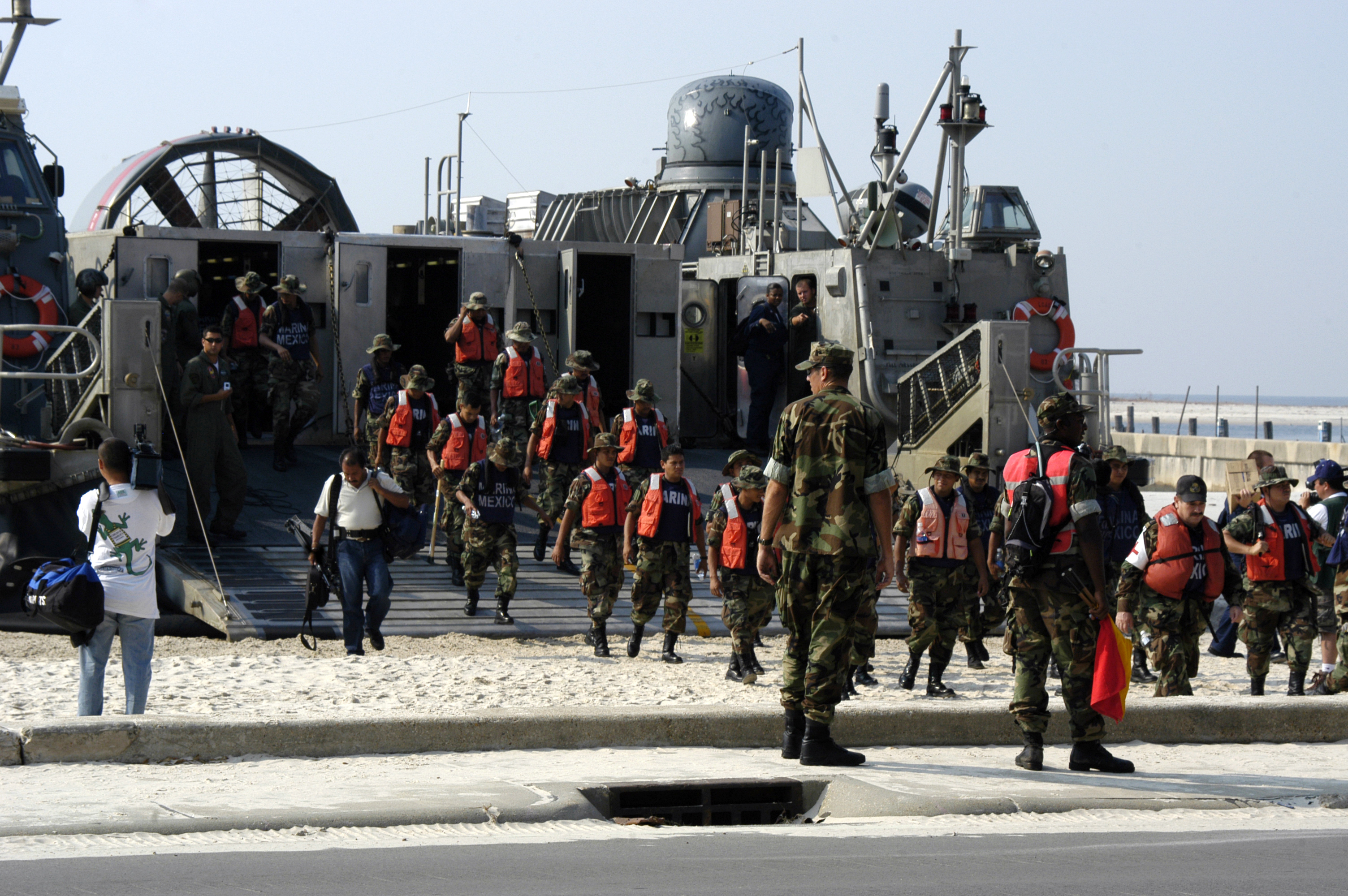
Mexican sailors assigned to the Mexican amphibious ship ARM Papaloapan (P-411) disembark from a U.S. Navy Landing Craft Air Cushion (LCAC) as they prepare to work on rehabilitation projects in the Biloxi, MS area.

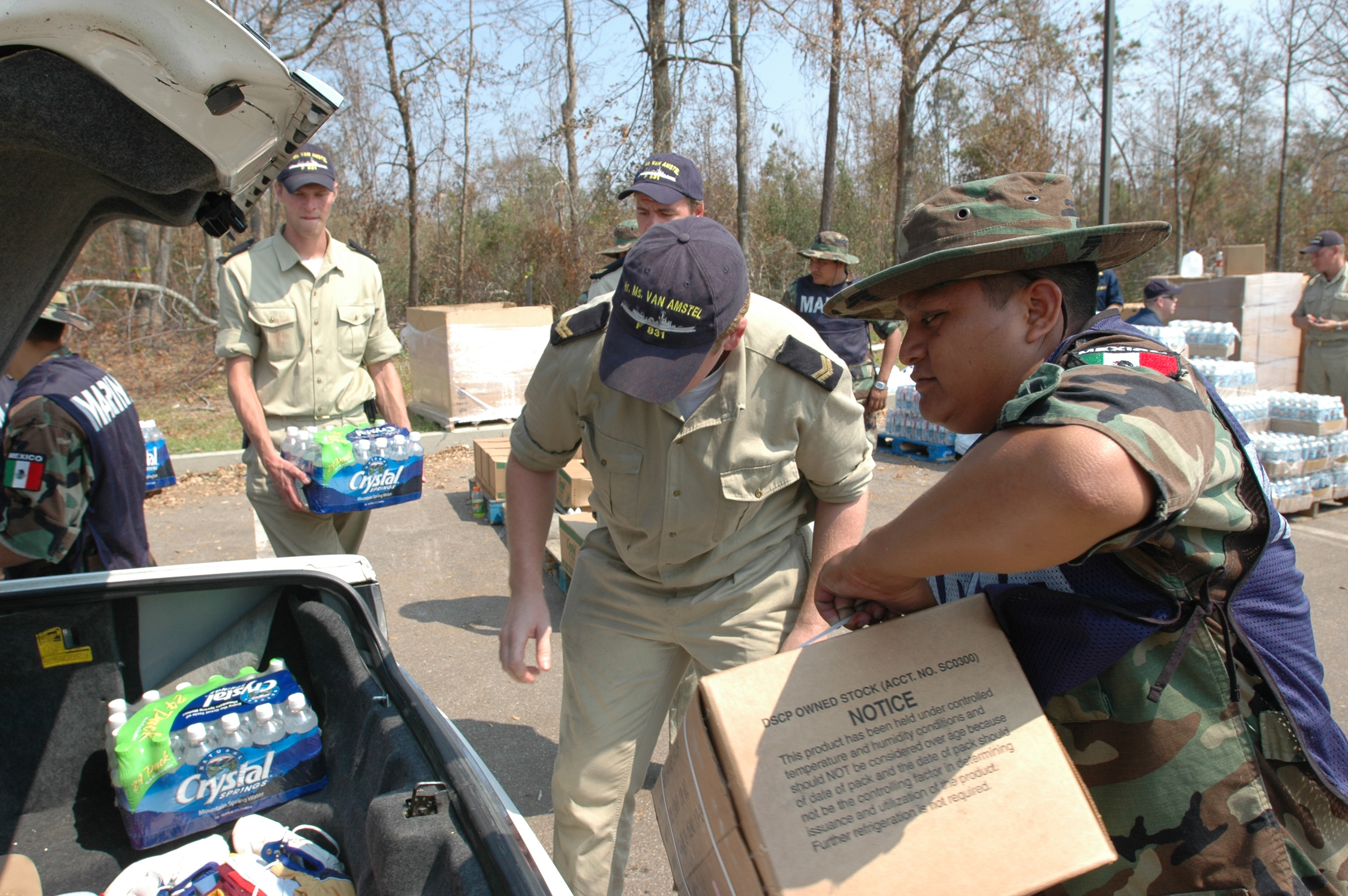
Mexican marines and Dutch sailors distributing aid and foodstuffs to Mississippian hurricane victims in September 2005.

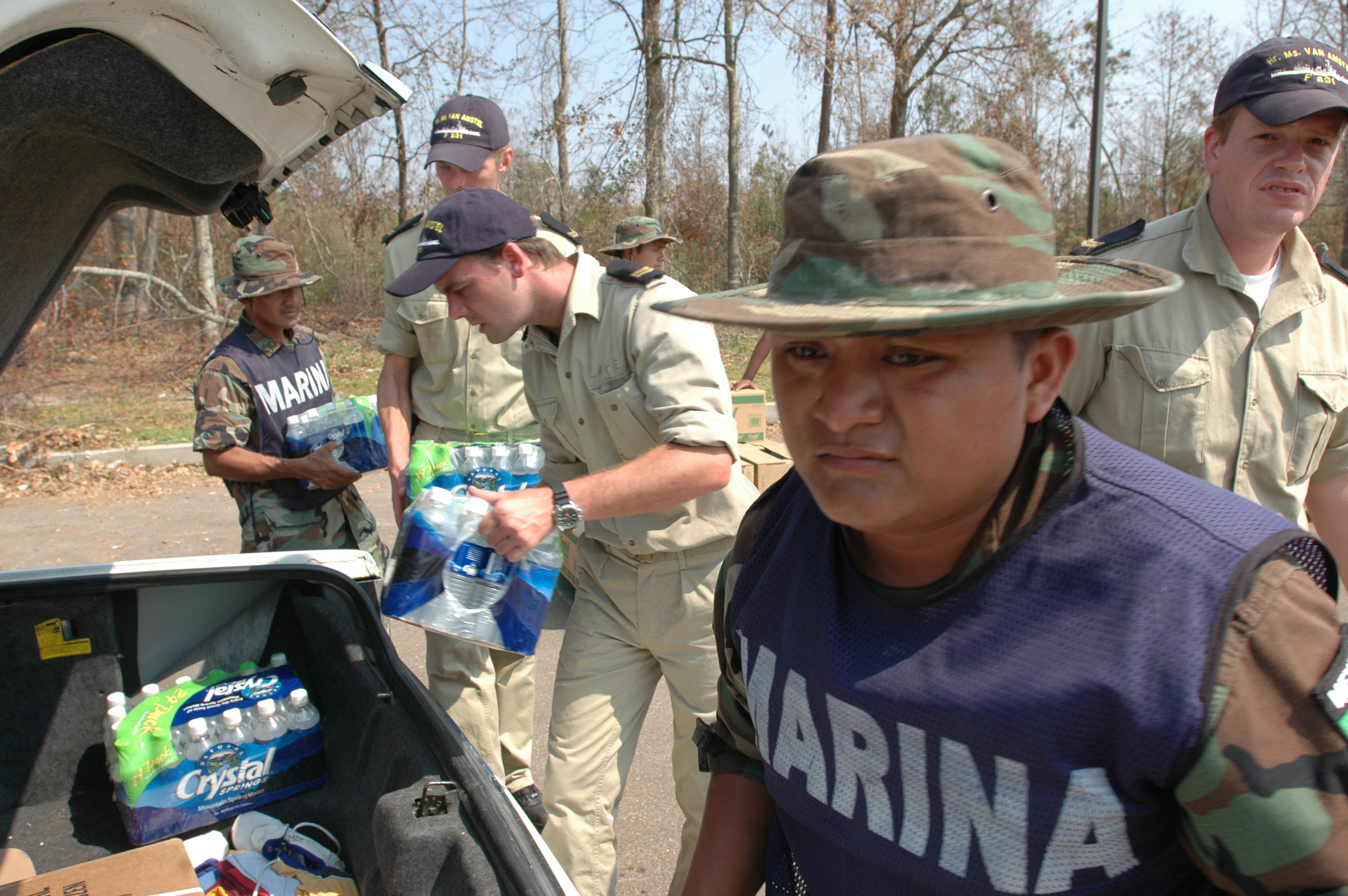
Mexican marines and Dutch sailors distributing aid and foodstuffs to Mississippian hurricane victims in September 2005.

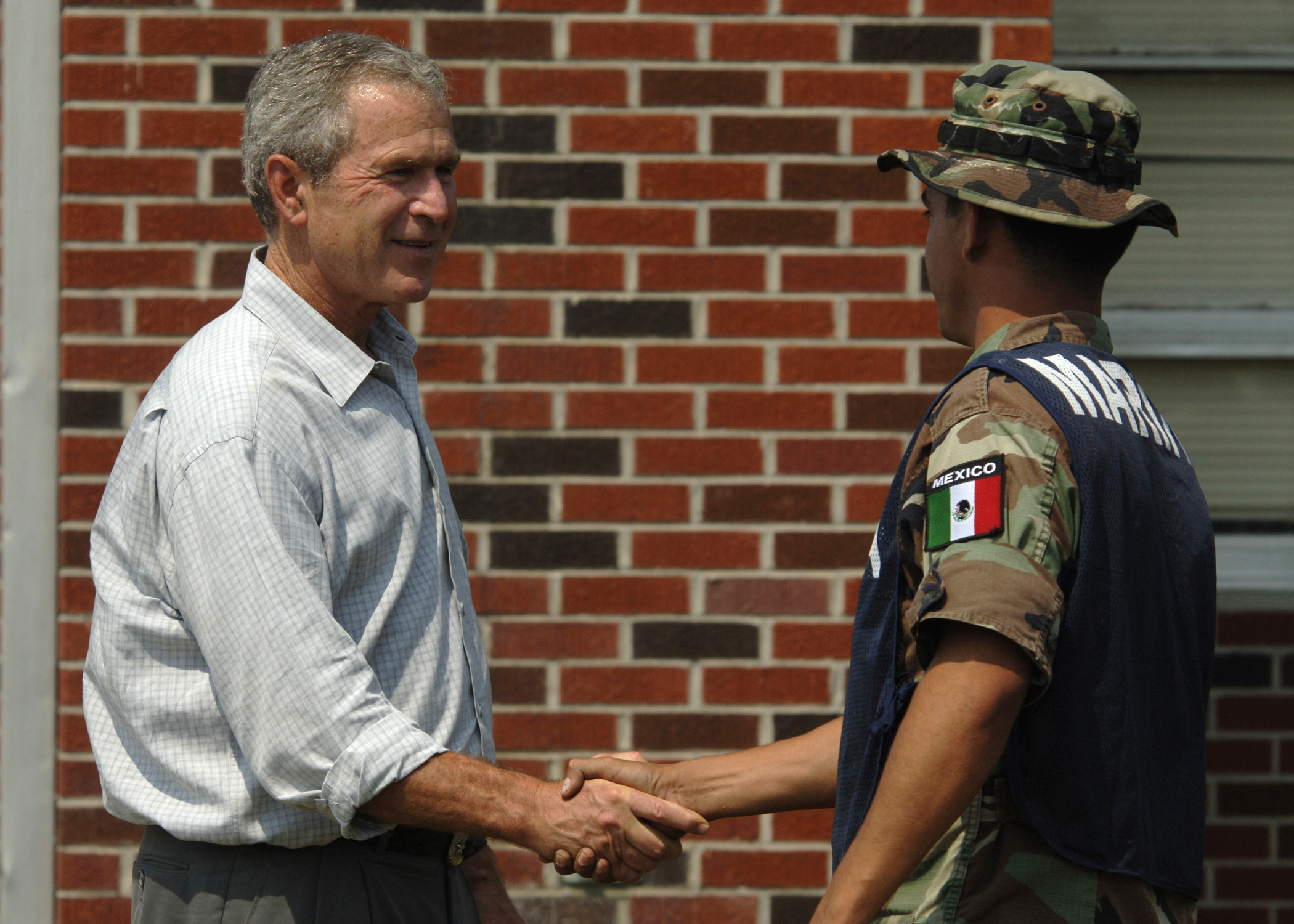
U.S. President George W. Bush conveys his gratitude to a Mexican marine on their cleanup efforts

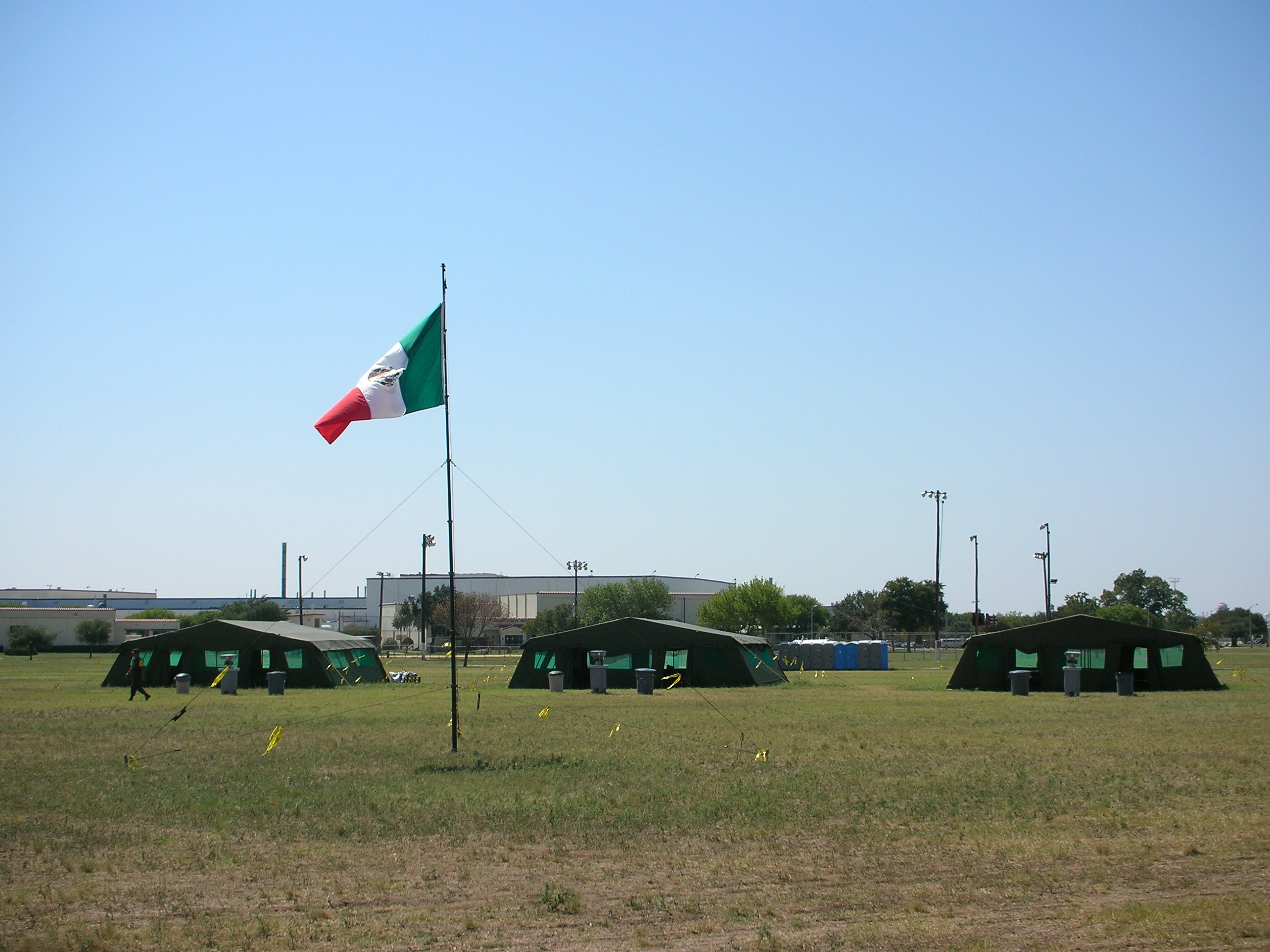
The Mexican army's camp at Kelly AFB during their deployment to the U.S.

In late August 2005, Hurricane Katrina struck the southeastern portion of the contiguous United States, causing severe damage and destruction in several U.S. states and killing roughly 1,800 people.

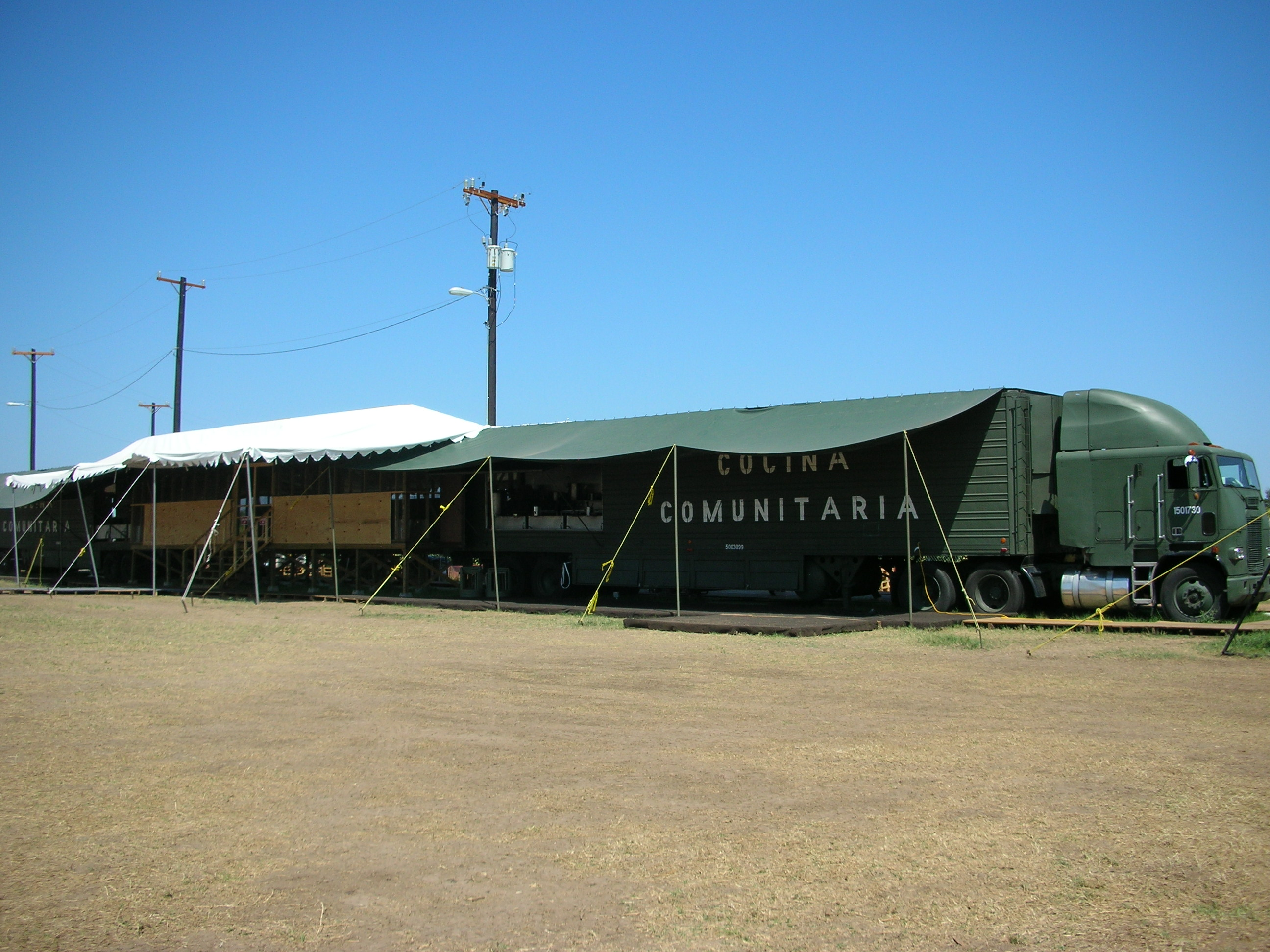
A Mexican Army mobile kitchen that was sent to Texas.

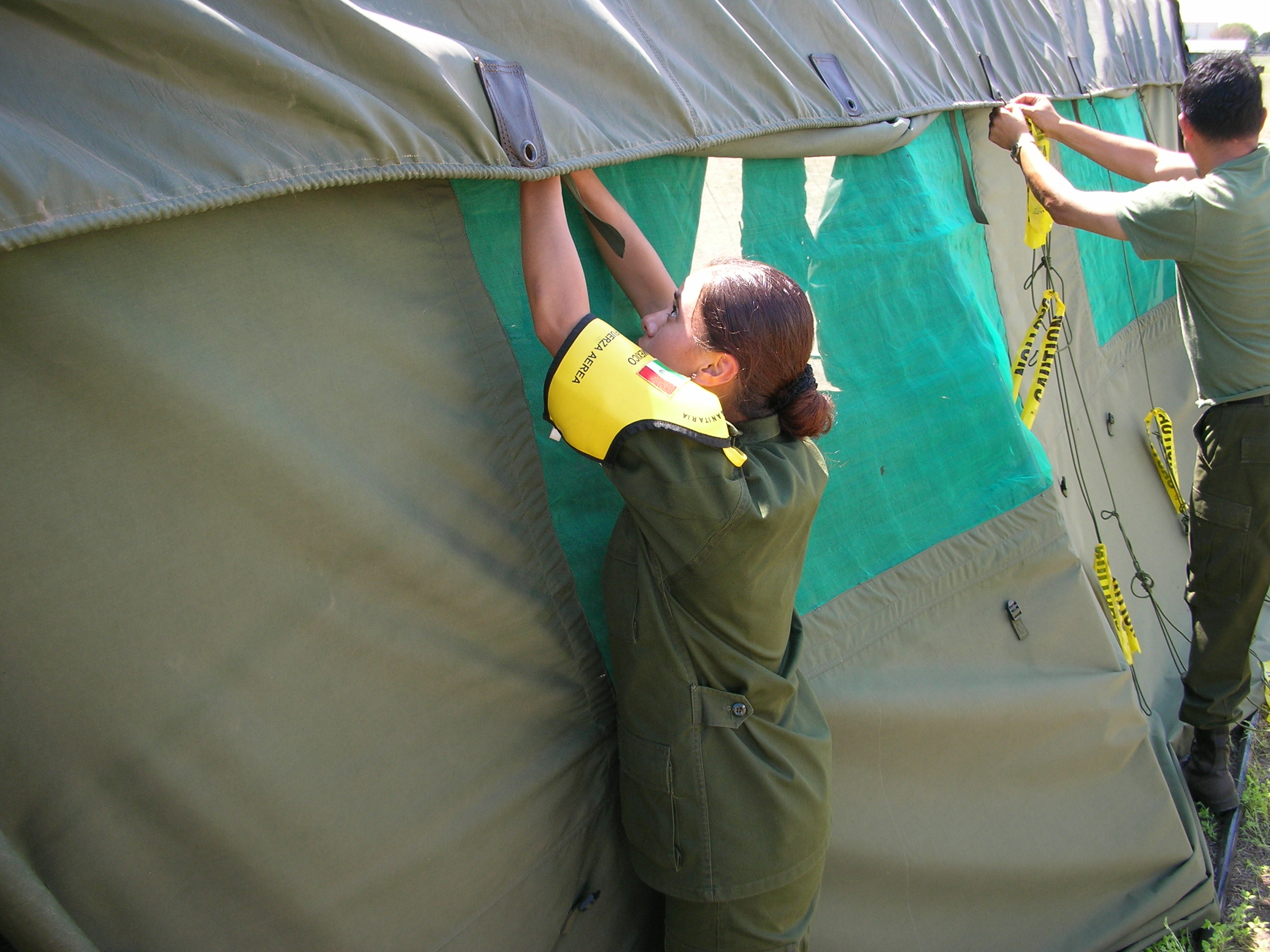
Mexican soldiers disassembling tents near the end of the deployment.

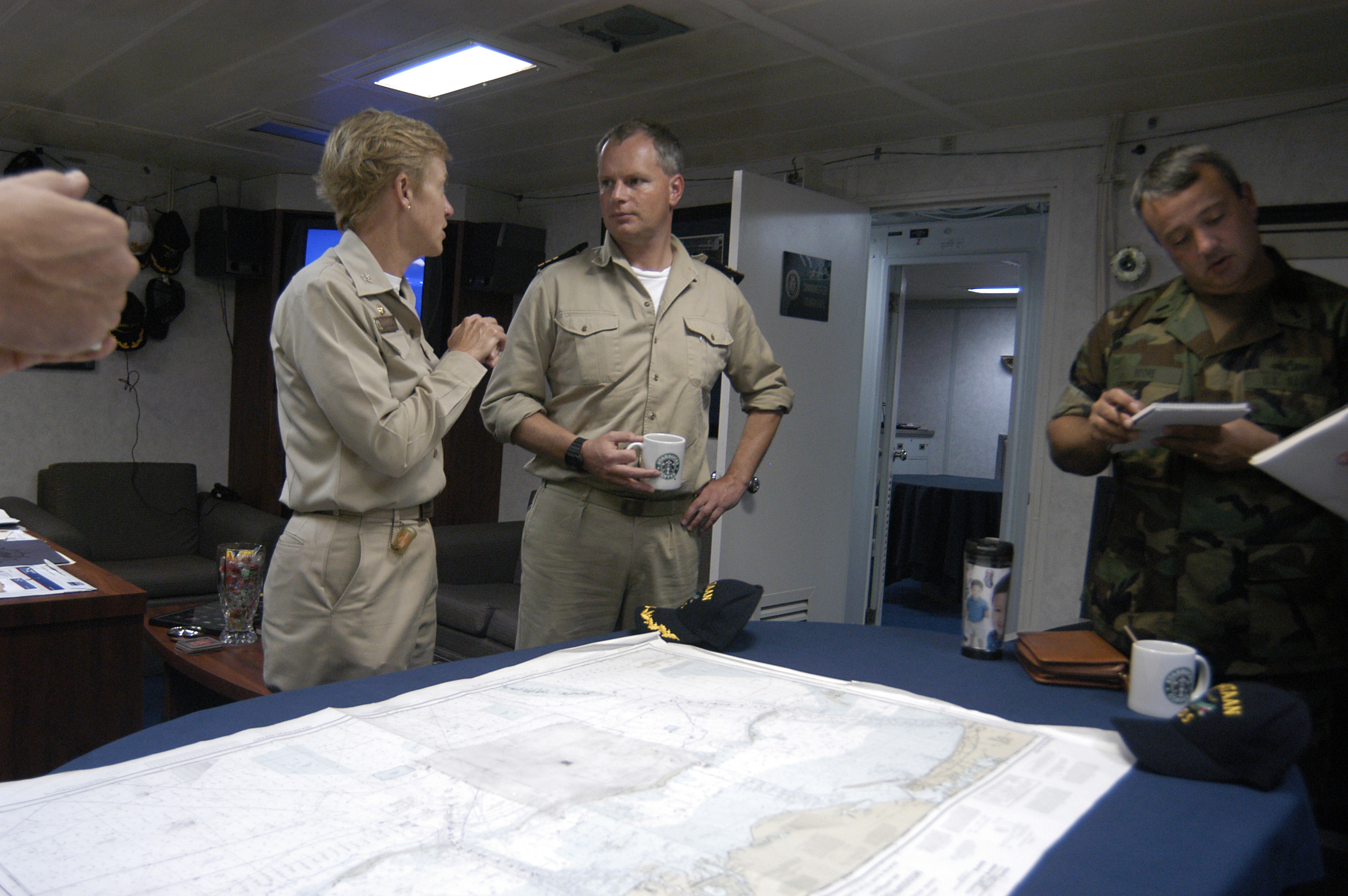
A Dutch navy officer and a U.S. Navy officer coordinating relief efforts.

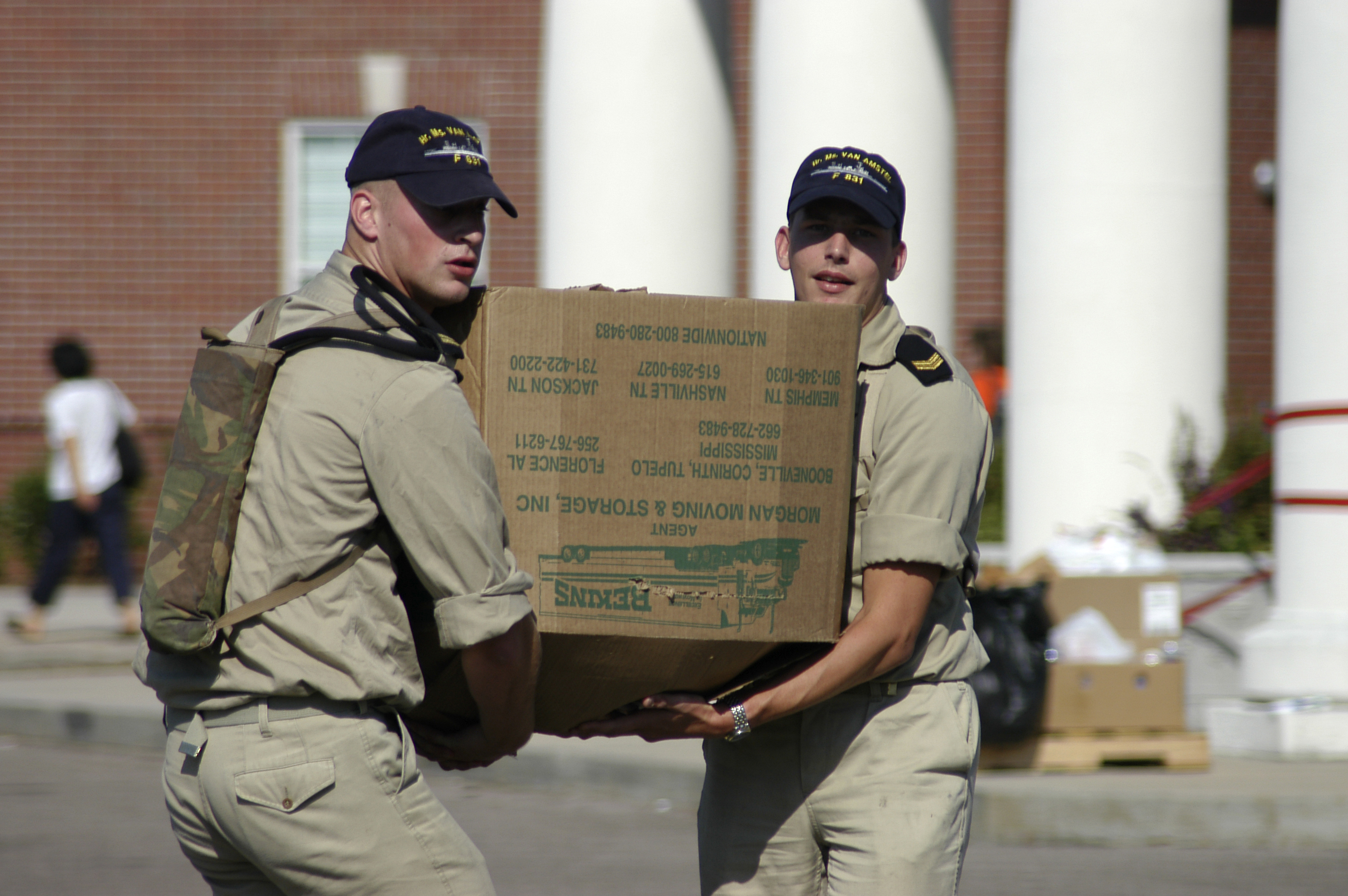
Dutch navy sailors carrying a box of aid supplies in Mississippi.

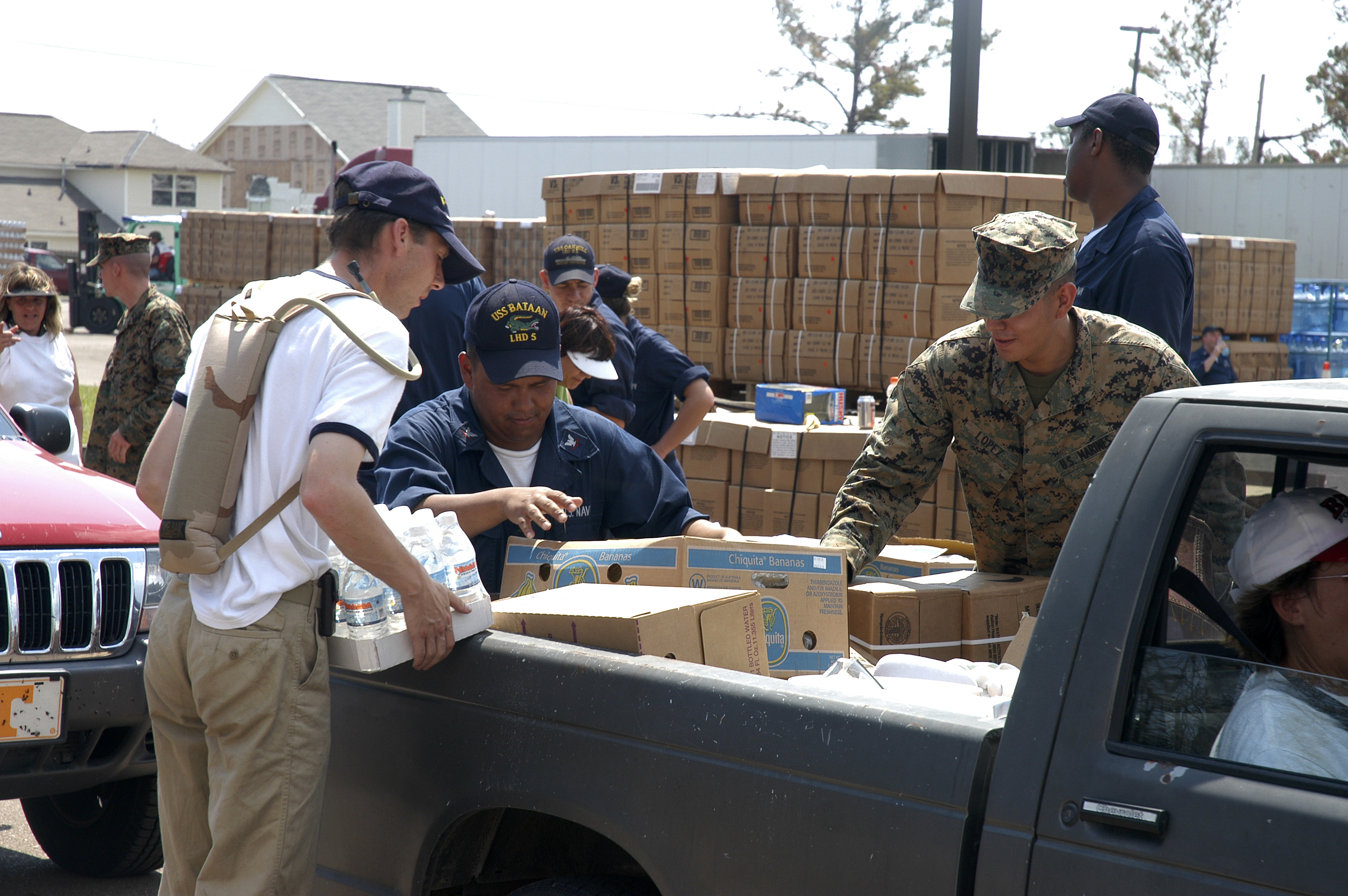
Dutch sailors, U.S. Marines, and U.S. Navy sailors unloading aid supplies in Mississippi.

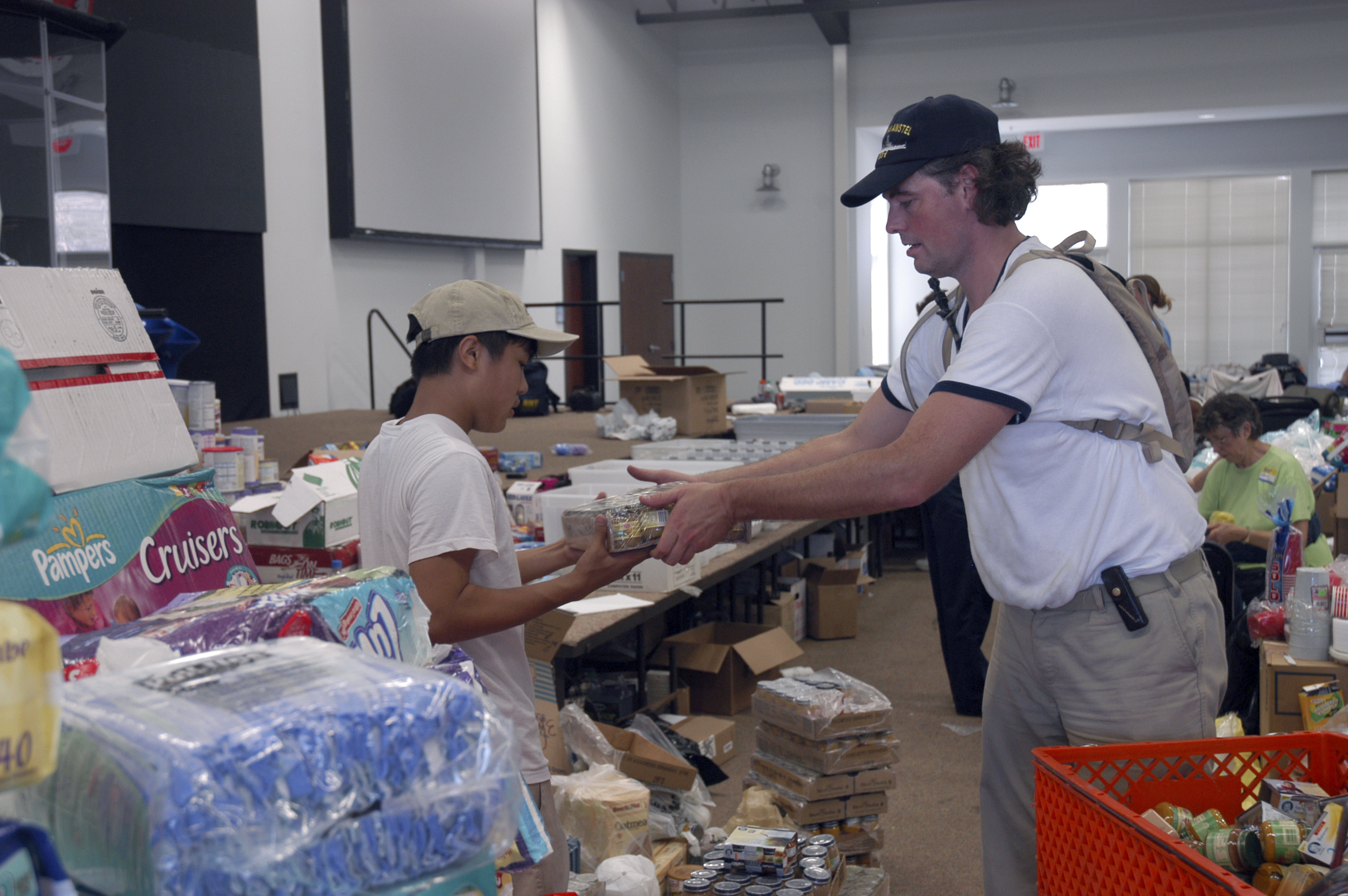
Dutch navy sailors distributing aid supplies in Mississippi.

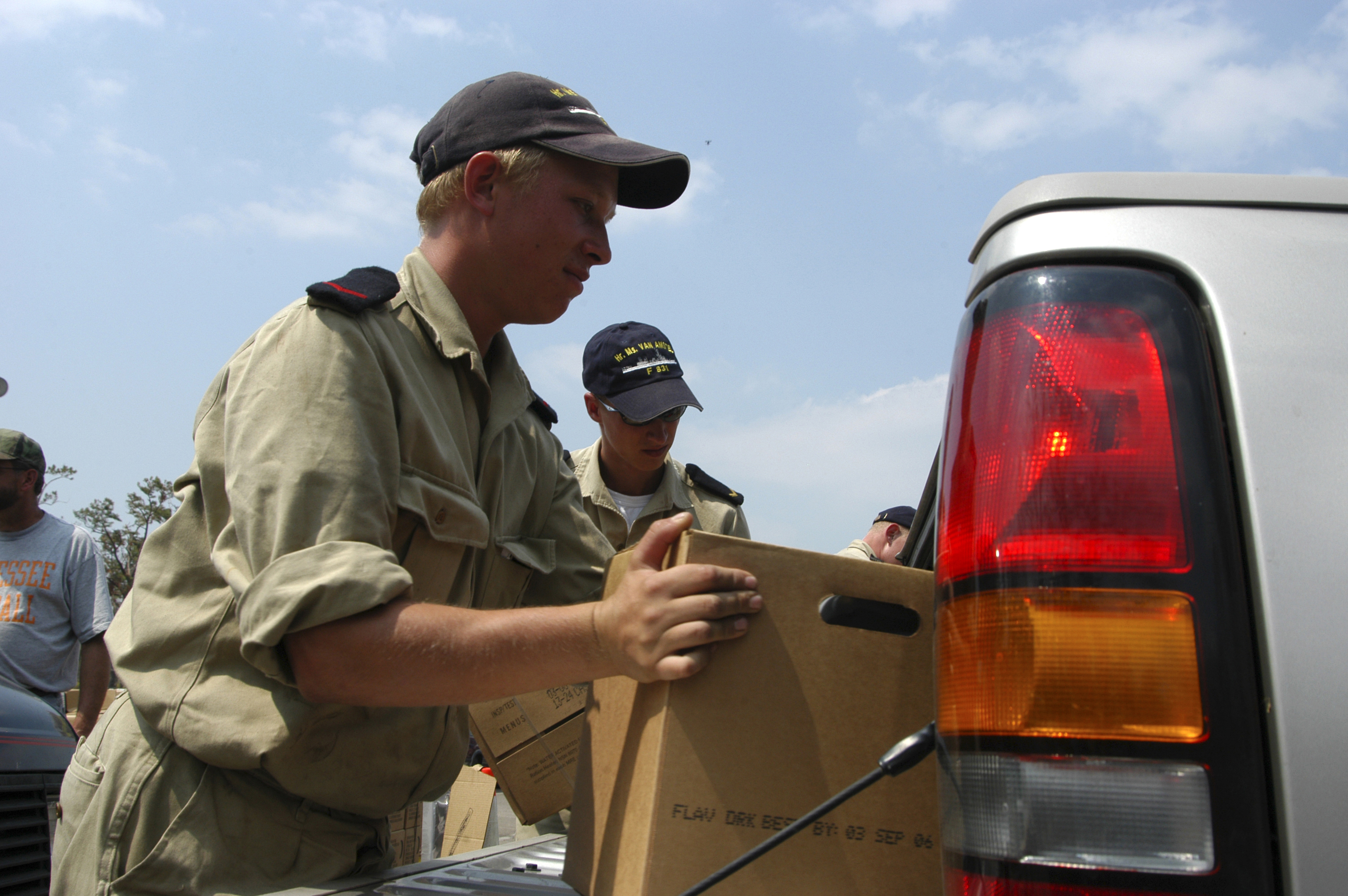
Dutch navy sailor unloading aid supplies in Mississippi.

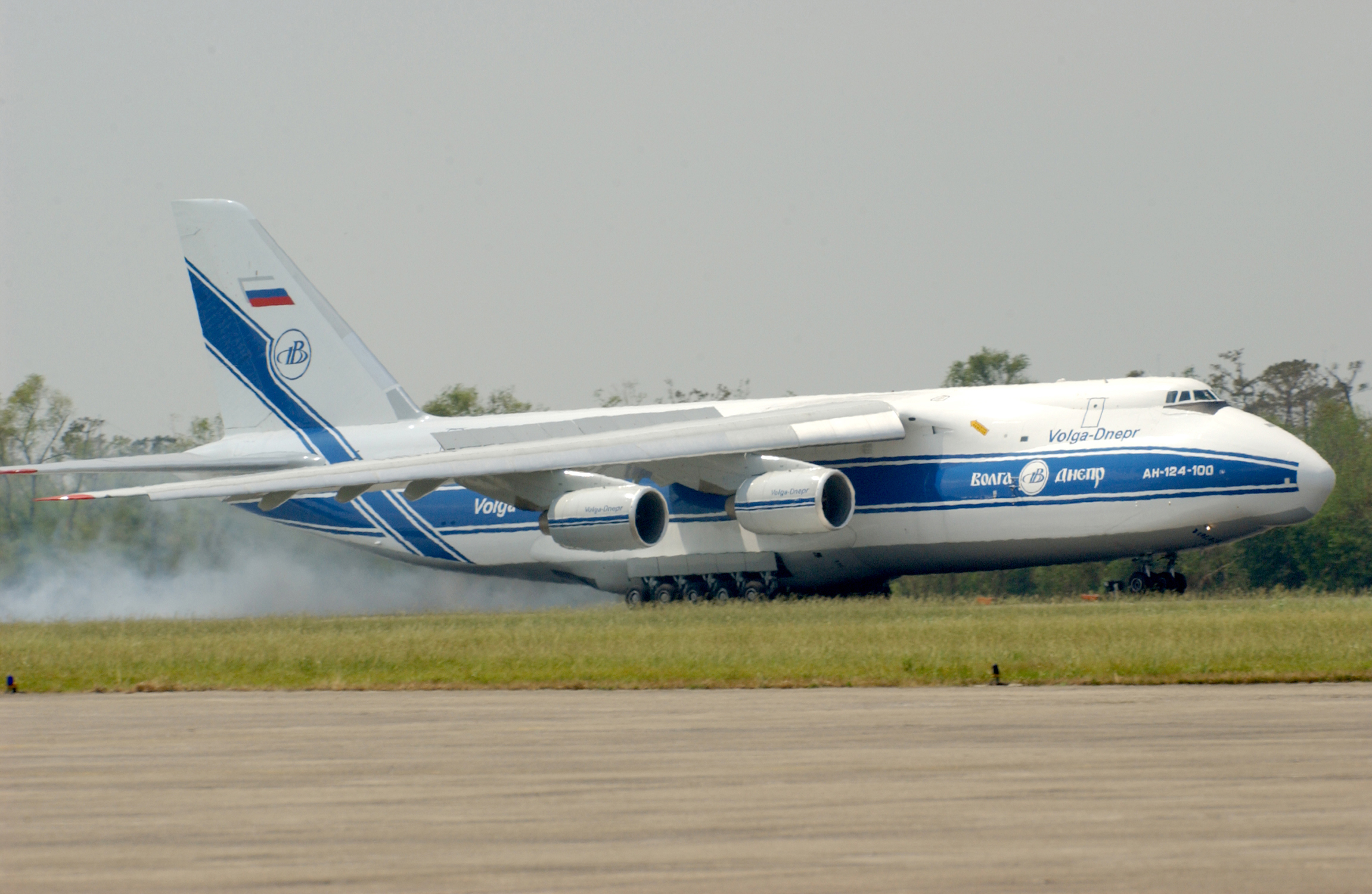
A Russian An-124 Ruslan/An-124 Condor aircraft lands at Naval Air Station Joint Reserve Base, New Orleans from the Netherlands to deliver a diesel powered water pump in support of Hurricane Katrina relief efforts

- Afghanistan: Donated US$100,000 to the hurricane victims.
- Albania: Pledged €240,000 (approximately US$300,000)
- Argentina: Made offers of help and assistance. Argentina also dispatched an elite team of bilingual mental health professionals.
- Armenia: Pledged $200,000 and made offers of help and assistance.
- Australia: A$10 million (approximately US$7.6 million).
- Austria: 140 specialists of the AFDRU were put on stand-by. Their focus was to have been on providing clean water with portable water-treatment plants. Within the EU Emergency Assistance for Katrina, Austria set up a communication network using IT and communication equipment for assistance/support, provided 10 sets petrol driven dirty water pumps, 500 pieces tarps/plastic sheeting and 300 camp beds.
- Azerbaijan: Donated $500,000.
- The Bahamas: Pledged $50,000.
- Bahrain: Donated $5 million.
- Bangladesh: Donated $1 million and offered rescuers.
- Belarus: Offered medical assistance
- Belgium: Offered 3 medical teams of 31 personnel, logistic team of 10 personnel, coordination team of 4 personnel, civil engineering team of 10 personnel, diving team, and also balloon-lamps, low and high capacity pumps and small generators.
- Brunei: Donated $1 million.
- Cambodia: The king donated $20,000 to match the $20,000 Cambodian government donation.
- Canada: On September 5, 35 military divers were poised to depart by air Sunday from Halifax, Nova Scotia and Esquimalt, British Columbia, for the New Orleans area. September 4, on the request from US Department of Health and Human Services, Canada sent thousands of beds, blankets, surgical gloves and dressings and other medical supplies. On September 2, the Government of Canada announced it was sending three warships along with a Coast Guard vessel, and three Sea King helicopters to the area. Over 1,000 personnel were involved in the operation, including engineers and navy divers. The Canadian Heavy Urban Search and Rescue out of Vancouver was in Louisiana from September 1, due to security they started their mission on Sept 3. Ontario Hydro, Hydro-Québec, and Manitoba Hydro, along with other electrical utilities, had crews set to go to the affected areas. On September 2, Air Canada participated along with U.S. member airlines of the Air Transport Association, in a voluntary airline industry initiative to support rescue and relief operations. Financial donations were substantial, with the province of Alberta alone contributed CA$5 million. Although it is hard to put an exact number on Canadian cash donations because of some Canadians donating directly to the American agencies, Canada is widely believed to be the highest international donor nation, and with the Netherlands and Mexico was one of the three countries in the world to supply direct military assistance in addition to civilian donations and supplies, as the U.S. government declined direct military support from all other nations.
- People's Republic of China: On September 2, the Ministry of Foreign Affairs said that it would offer $5 million along with emergency supplies, including 1,000 tents, 600 generators, bed sheets, immediately for disaster relief. China also offered to send medical care and rescue workers if they were needed. This aid package consisting of 104 tons of supplies later arrived in Little Rock, Arkansas. A chartered plane carrying the supplies arrived on September 7.
- Republic of China (Taiwan): Pledged more than $3 million to the relief effort, plus supplies.
- Colombia: Made offers of help and assistance.
- Cuba: One of the first countries to offer aid, Cuba offered to send 1,586 doctors and 26 tons of medicine. This aid was rejected by the State Department. Also, before the 2006 World Baseball Classic, Cuba said they would donate their share of the winnings to Katrina victims to ensure the United States embargo against Cuba was not violated. However, after the tournament, the U.S. government refused to allow the donation.
- Cyprus: Offered $50,000.
- Czech Republic: Offered rescue teams, field hospitals and pumps and water processing equipment.
- Denmark: Offered water purification units.
- Djibouti: Offered $50,000.
- Dominica: Offered police to monitor hard-hit areas.
- Dominican Republic: Offered rescue workers, doctors and nurses.
- Ecuador: Made offers of help and assistance.
- Egypt: Sent 2 C-130 planes loaded with blankets, medical equipment, and canned food.
- El Salvador: Offered to send troops to help keep order in New Orleans.
- Equatorial Guinea: Pledged $500,000.
- Finland: The Finn Rescue Force—the group consists of 30 firemen was offered by the Finnish Government but refused. The Finnish Red Cross sent three Red Cross logistics experts.
  - $100,000 was given by the Finnish government to be distributed by U.S. authorities. A Finnish cruise ship, Finnjet, operated by Silja Line, was sent to Baton Rouge for use by the LSU Department of Medicine. 9,000 sheets, 1,000 pillowcases, 200 small tarps, 200 first aid kits, 120 cooler cases and 3,500 thermo sheets were sent to Little Rock for distribution in Louisiana. Nokia donated $1 million to the U.S. Red Cross and matched employee contributions at 100 percent. Mobile phones were donated to shelters in Dallas, Houston and San Antonio.
  - Additionally Finland offered 300 tents, a water purification unit, sterile gloves, bed sheets, pillow covers, tarps and first aid kits.
- France: Concrete help was initially refused by the U.S. government; however, on September 2, Condoleezza Rice said that the U.S. authorities would assess the situation and contact French authorities accordingly. On September 4, U.S. authorities formally requested French assistance. France offered disaster relief stocks prepositioned in Martinique (600 tents, around 1000 beds, 60 generators, 30 pumps, 3 water purification stations, 1000 folding jerricans and other material). A 35-person team of the Sécurité Civile (Civil Defence) from Guadeloupe and Martinique were made ready, and a 60-man "catastrophe intervention" aeromobile detachment were prepared to be ferried from mainland in a short time. The Ministry of Defence offered 2 planes already in the zone and 6 more from mainland France, and two ships of the French Navy (probably the BATRAL Francis Garnier or Champlain, and the frigate Ventôse and a 20-person team of emergency medical specialists. The non-governmental organisation Télécoms Sans Frontières and the company Véolia Environnement offered aid in communications and water management respectively. On September 7, the Ministry for Foreign Affairs stated that an Airbus Beluga from Toulouse with 12.7 tonnes of supplies flew to Mobile, Alabama, after a brief stop in the U.K. to load more food. Two CASA airplanes from Martinique landed in Little Rock, Arkansas, ferrying tents, covers and 1000 rations of food for 24 hours.
- Gabon: Pledged $500,000.
- Georgia: Made offers of help and assistance.
- Germany: Two German military Airbus planes landed in Florida with about 25 tons of food rations to be transported to the disaster area. Further planes were prepared. Germany offered airlifting, vaccination, water purification, medical supplies including German air force hospital planes, emergency electrical power and pumping services. The aid was ready to go on German air force and chartered planes. A team of specialists from THW (German federal agency for technical relief) were planning technical measures and logistics in close contact with local authorities. A team of 89 flood fighting specialists and 5 medical personnel were dispatched from Ramstein Air Base to Louisiana by the United States Air Force. They brought 15 high performance pumps (10 pumps with a capacity of 15,000 litres per minute and 5 pumps with a capacity of 5,000 litres per minute) and 28 vehicles. On Saturday, September 10 at 4:30 PM, the THW started the first 15,000 litre pump at pumping-station No. 19. Three other 15,000 litres pumps followed. The drainage of New Orleans would have taken much more time if these pumps and the THW specialists had not been provided.

The Minister-President of the federal state of Rhineland-Palatinate addressed a letter to the commanders of the American forces stationed in his state offering financial support to those affected by the flooding.
Another German Air Force cargo plane carrying several thousand military rations (MRE) was denied entry into U.S. airspace since, according to U.S. authorities, they were not certified BSE-free. This was disputed by German authorities, pointing out that they were BSE-free according to NATO rules, that U.S. soldiers would eat them regularly during joint operations (e.g. Afghanistan) and that these meals fully complied to U.N. rules.

- Greece: Offered $85,000, two cruise ships to house those left homeless, a rescue team, and supplies.
- Guatemala: Made offers of help and assistance.
- Guyana: Made offers of help and assistance and organized a telethon to raise money for victims.
- Honduras: Offered 135 flooding and sanitation experts.
- Hungary: Pledged $5,000 and offered to send a Special Search and Rescue Team, and also five doctors.
- Iceland: Offered $500,000.
- India: India offered to contribute $5 million to the United States Red Cross for relief and rehabilitation of the victims. They also offered to donate medicines and large water purification systems for use in households and small communities in the stricken areas, where potable water was a key concern. India sent tarps, blankets and hygiene kits. An Indian Air Force IL-76 aircraft delivered 25 tonnes of relief supplies for the Hurricane Katrina victims at the Little Rock Air Force Base, Arkansas on September 13, 2005.
- Indonesia: Offered to send 45 doctors and 155 other medical staffers and 10,000 blankets to help survivors.
- Iran: Iran's envoy to OPEC said his country was ready to send up to five shiploads 20 million barrels (3,200,000 m^{3}) of crude oil to the U.S. But he said this could only happen if U.S. sanctions were lifted first.
- Iraq: Pledged $1 million to the Red Cross via the Red Crescent.
- Ireland: Offered to send 30 members of the Irish Defence Forces. The Irish army would have supplied thousands of ready meals, tents, blankets, water purification services and medical aid, including first aid kits, crutches and wheelchairs. The group would have included about ten experts in stress debriefing. Six of the troops would have operated two water purification plants. The Irish government also announced it is to provide initial funding of EUR 1.2 million for the victims.
- Israel: Offered field hospitals and hundreds of doctors, nurses, technicians and other experts in trauma, natural disasters and public health.
  - An Israeli airlift arrived in Little Rock, Arkansas with an eighty-ton shipment of humanitarian aid, including baby food, diapers, water, ready-to-eat meals, clothes, tents, blankets, mattresses, stretchers, first aid kits, wheelchairs, and other medical supplies.
  - The Magen David Adom began "United Brotherhood Operation," which sent a plane-load of supplies and financial assistance.
  - IsraAid sent a delegation of medical personnel, psychologists, and experienced search-and-rescue divers. The 18-member team – which included physicians, mental health professionals, trauma specialists, logistics experts and a special unit of Israeli police divers – arrived in St. Bernard Parish and Plaquemines Parish on Sept. 10 and spent a week and a half assisting fire department search-and-rescue squads and sitting in on daily planning meetings that included local leadership and a complement of Federal Emergency Management Agency (FEMA), police, military, fire representatives and medical teams.
  - Five universities in Israel welcomed displaced American students from the affected areas and invited both undergraduate and graduate students to continue their studies in Israel. In particular, medical students unable to attend the Tulane University in New Orleans can attend Tel Aviv University's Sackler School of Medicine.
- Italy: Italy offered to send two Hercules C130 cargo aircraft fitted with emergency aids, including 300 Adult camp beds, 300 blankets, 600 sheets, 1 suction pump, 6 lifecrafts, 11.200 chlorine tablets, 5 units of large first aid kits, baby food & formula, pumps, tents and power generators. Italy also offered to send some experts of the Protezione Civile to help coordinating relief efforts in the damaged area.
- Jamaica: Made offers of help and assistance.
- Japan: The Japanese Foreign Ministry said that it would provide $200,000 in cash to the American Red Cross to assist victims of Hurricane Katrina. Japan also identified needs in affected regions via the U.S. government and provided up to $800,000 in emergency supplies such as tents, blankets and power generators if they receive requests from the U.S. for such assistance. Private and corporate donations totalled over $13 million. One Japanese individual, Takashi Endo, donated US$1 million from his personal funds to Katrina relief efforts.
- Jordan: Made offers of help and assistance.
- Kenya: Offered $100,000. There were also early reports of $400 million in petroleum products being donated from Kenya, though these later proved to be erroneous.
- Kuwait: Parliament approved $500 million for aid in oil and other humanitarian aid.
- Latvia: Offered a disaster relief team
- Lithuania: Made offers of help and assistance.
- Luxembourg: Team of five persons, 1,000 camp beds and 2,000 blankets.
- Malaysia: Pledged $1 million to the American Red Cross.
- Maldives: Sent $25,000 to the American Red Cross.
- Mauritania: Promised $200,000 to the American Red Cross.
- Malta: Made offers of help and assistance.
- Mexico: Kelly Air Force Base in San Antonio, Texas received almost 196 Mexican troops, 14 truckloads of water, a mobile surgical unit, 45 military vehicles, 3 tons of purified water, and more than 250 tons of food, bottled water, canned food, disposable diapers and medical supplies. The Mexican government sent $1 million through the Mexican Red Cross which collected an additional million, as well as 200 tons of food delivered in five airplanes from the Mexican Air Force by another Mexican government body. The Mexican Navy sent two ships, 385 troopers, eight all-terrain vehicles, seven amphibious vehicles, two tankers, two helicopters, radio communication equipment, medical personnel and 296 tons of food as well. The state of Jalisco also sent four experts in disaster, while the federal government offered to send expert teams in epidemiology and to cover the costs of returning any Mexican national back to Mexico.
- Mongolia: Pledged $50,000.
- Nepal: Pledged $25,000.
- The Netherlands: Royal Netherlands Navy Frigate HNLMS Van Amstel (F831) arrived from the Netherlands Antilles in early September. The frigate was filled with supplies including food, water, fuel, shovels, and sandbags. The ship launched two Lynx helicopters that distributed aid from a land-based airfield. The Dutch Navy believed their help was accepted despite American refusals of other nations because the ship operated without burdening local resources. The ship deployed men to distribution centers and cleanup efforts ashore. On September 7, the U.S. government announced that it would take up the Dutch government's offer to send water pumps, and also five water management experts. Assistance concluded September 12. The US Army Corps of Engineers collaborated with Dutch engineers and researchers in flood planning "immediately after Katrina."
- New Zealand: Pledged $2 million through the Red Cross. This contribution was in addition to the offers the government has already made to send an Urban Search and Rescue Team, a Disaster Victim Identification team or post disaster recovery personnel.
- Nicaragua: Made offers of help and assistance.
- Nigeria: Pledged US$1 million to hurricane disaster relief.
- Norway: Made offers of help and assistance. An amount of NOK 10 million (US$1.781 million) was given through the Norwegian Red Cross and the UN. In addition, Norway offered divers and medicines.
- Oman: Pledged $15 million.
- Pakistan: On September 4 Pakistan offered to send a team of doctors and paramedics to support the relief agencies. Pakistan also pledged $1 million through the Red Cross.
- Palau: Pledged $50,000.
- Papua New Guinea: Promised $10,000 to the American Red Cross.
- Paraguay: Made offers of help and assistance.
- Peru: Offered to send 80-100 doctors to help survivors.
- Philippines: Offered to send a 25-member team of aid workers. The Philippines Red Cross donated $25,000.
- Poland: Made offers of help and assistance.
- Portugal: Offered tents, mattresses, blankets, hygiene kits. Portugal lent 2% of its strategic oil reserve, equivalent to 500,000 barrels (79,000 m^{3}) of oil.
- Qatar: Pledged $100 million to the victims.
- Romania: Offered 2 teams of medical experts.
- Russia: Was one of the first countries to offer assistance. Up to four jets were placed on standby at the Ramenskoye Airport near Moscow as early as August 30, including heavy Ilyushin Il-76-TDs with special evacuation equipment, medical equipment, a water-cleansing system, a BK-117 rescue helicopter and two special cars; and a passenger IL-62, which brought 10 coordinators and 50 rescuers, as well as 6 tons of drinking water. On September 6, the Bush administration gave its approval.
- Saudi Arabia: Saudi Refining, a Houston-based subsidiary of state oil firm Saudi Aramco, donated $5 million to the American Red Cross, as well as $250,000 from AGFUND.
- Singapore: Three Singaporean CH-47 Chinook helicopters and thirty-eight RSAF personnel from a training detachment based in Grand Prairie, Texas assisted in relief operations from 1 September. They had so far ferried about 700 evacuees and hauled tons of supplies in 39 sorties on 4 September. One more CH-47 Chinook helicopter was sent to aid in relief efforts.
- Slovakia: Promised blankets, beds, first aid kits.
- Slovenia: $120,000 worth of cots, mattresses, blankets, temporary shelters and first-aid kits.
- South Korea: Offered $30 million and dispatched a rescue team.
- Spain: Spain sent 2.1 million barrels (330,000 m^{3}) of crude oil from its strategic reserves (1.75% of the Spanish reserves) for a 30-day period. On September 7 two Hercules cargo aircraft took off with 15 tons of food rations, electrical generators and batteries, medical equipment and other humanitarian assistance collected by the Agencia Española de Cooperación Internacional (AECI). A second envoy was sent a few days later.
- Sri Lanka: Pledged $25,000 for relief efforts.
- Sweden: Sweden offered to send medical and technical aid, and a Hercules cargo aircraft filled with three complete GSM systems, first aid kits, blankets, Ready-to-eat meals, generators, 2 heavy water purification plants, as well as water sanitation experts. On September 4 the U.S. State Department declined the aid, saying it was currently unable to accept foreign aid packages. On September 12 the Hercules plane left the Göteborg Landvetter Airport, carrying a cargo of three Ericsson GSM network systems. A team of technical consultants to help with the aid package was also provided.
- Switzerland: Switzerland offered specialized personnel and material to the U.S. and the World Health Organization (WHO). In accordance with U.S. requirements, 50 tonnes of rescue equipment were ready to be sent, along with two logisticians of the Direction du développement et de la coopération (DDC, "Swiss Agency for Development and Cooperation") to help coordinate distributions. Four physicians and two water specialists were also put to the disposal of the WHO.
- Thailand: Sent at least 60 doctors and nurses along with rice.
- Tunisia: Sent two C-130s with relief supplies.
- Turkey: Promised $2.5 million in cash and aid.
- Uganda: Offered $200,000.
- Ukraine: Ukrainian relief funds promised to send relief aid. Donations were estimated to exceed $550,000.
- United Arab Emirates: Pledged $100 million.
- United Kingdom: The United Kingdom dispatched 500,000 ration packs worth €3 million, to the region. However, many of the ration packs did not reach victims due to laws regarding mad cow disease. It also offered medical experts, Urban Search and Rescue equipment, Marine engineers and high-volume pumps, skilled personnel including engineers who could support recovery efforts for installations and systems, technicians, staff trained in disaster management and emergency response activities. It also pledged to release an extra 2.2 million barrels (350,000 m^{3}) of oil.
- Venezuela: President Hugo Chávez of Venezuela offered one million barrels of oil and 5 million dollars in aid to the United States.
- Vietnam: Pledged $100,000.
- Yemen: Pledged $100,000 through the Red Cross.

== Pledges from international organizations ==
Below is a list of international governmental organizations offering aid to the people of the United States.

- European Union: Any help and assistance that is requested, also agreed to provide oil reserves to the U.S. The U.S. only accepted first aid kits, blankets, water trucks, and 500,000 Ready-to-eat meals.
- Habitat for Humanity International: Pledged to help Habitat families and other low-income families in the affected areas recover and rebuild.
- International Energy Agency: The Paris-based International Energy Agency agreed to make 60 million barrels (9,500,000 m^{3}) of product available "to help the United States weather the economic problems caused by Hurricane Katrina. The product, crude oil or gasoline, will go to the marketplace over the next month at the rate of 2 million barrels per day (320,000 m^{3}/d)."
- IFRC (Red Cross and Red Crescent): Sent more than 80 disaster experts. The International Federation of Red Cross and Red Crescent Societies launched the largest mobilisation of resources for a single natural disaster, including the recruitment of 1,900 staff and volunteers. All available resources were moved to safe areas so relief efforts could begin immediately after the storm passed. More than 250 people were playing in emergency response vehicles (ERVs) and countless other Red Cross resources were sent to provide hot meals, snacks, bottled water and distribute other much-needed relief supplies. The Red Cross opened shelters in support of the massive evacuations in all affected states. As of Monday, 29 August, some 230 Red Cross shelters had been opened in Mississippi, Louisiana and Texas, housing over 40,000 people. In coordination with the Southern Baptists, preparations have been made to provide more than 500,000 hot meals each day.
- International Medical Corps: Deployed a rapid response team to affected areas in Louisiana and Mississippi to determine the needs in impacted communities, provided medical, technical, and financial assistance. From September through December, IMC provided volunteer physicians and nurses to run mobile clinics serving displaced communities in Louisiana, serving more than 13,000 patients. An IMC psychosocial support program provided tools and strategies to school-based staff and volunteers to enable them to cope with their own grief and loss and to address the needs of affected students. IMC also provided structured psychosocial activities for children, adolescents, and their families at a FEMA-established temporary trailer parks.
- NATO: Made offers of help and assistance. As of September 4, NATO provided humanitarian aid, such as food, medical supplies, and wheelchairs. NATO was prepared to send troops, but the U.S. government has not issued a request for personnel.
- OPEC: Made offers of help and assistance.
- Organization of American States: Donated $25,000 to the American Red Cross.
- United Nations: The United Nations said it was ready to send supply water storage tanks, water purification tablets, high-energy biscuits, generators, planes, tents and other emergency supplies along with experienced staff members. The U.N. set up an inter-agency task force composed of representatives from the United Nations Children's Fund, the World Health Organization, the Food and Agriculture Organization, the United Nations High Commissioner for Refugees' office and the World Food Program, chaired by the Office for the Coordination of Humanitarian Affairs (OCHA) to determine resources available to assist U.S. relief efforts in anticipation of a possible request from the U.S. government.
- United Nations High Commissioner for Refugees: As an independent agency, made offers of help and assistance.
- World Health Organization: As an independent agency, made offers of help and assistance.

== Actual funds used ==
An article in the April 29, 2007 Washington Post claimed that of the $854 million offered by foreign countries, whom the article dubs "allies," to the US Government, only $40 million of the funds had been spent "for disaster victims or reconstruction" as of the date of publication (less than 5%).

Additionally, a large portion of the $854 million in aid offered went uncollected, including over $400 million in oil (almost 50%).

== See also ==
- Hurricane Katrina disaster relief
