= Arthur Lawson (police officer) =

Arthur S. Lawson, Jr. is the chief of police of the Louisiana city of Gretna. He is primarily known for his controversial actions in preventing New Orleans residents from entering Gretna via the Crescent City Connection during and after Hurricane Katrina.
