= D'Entrecasteaux-class patrol ship =

French Navy ship type

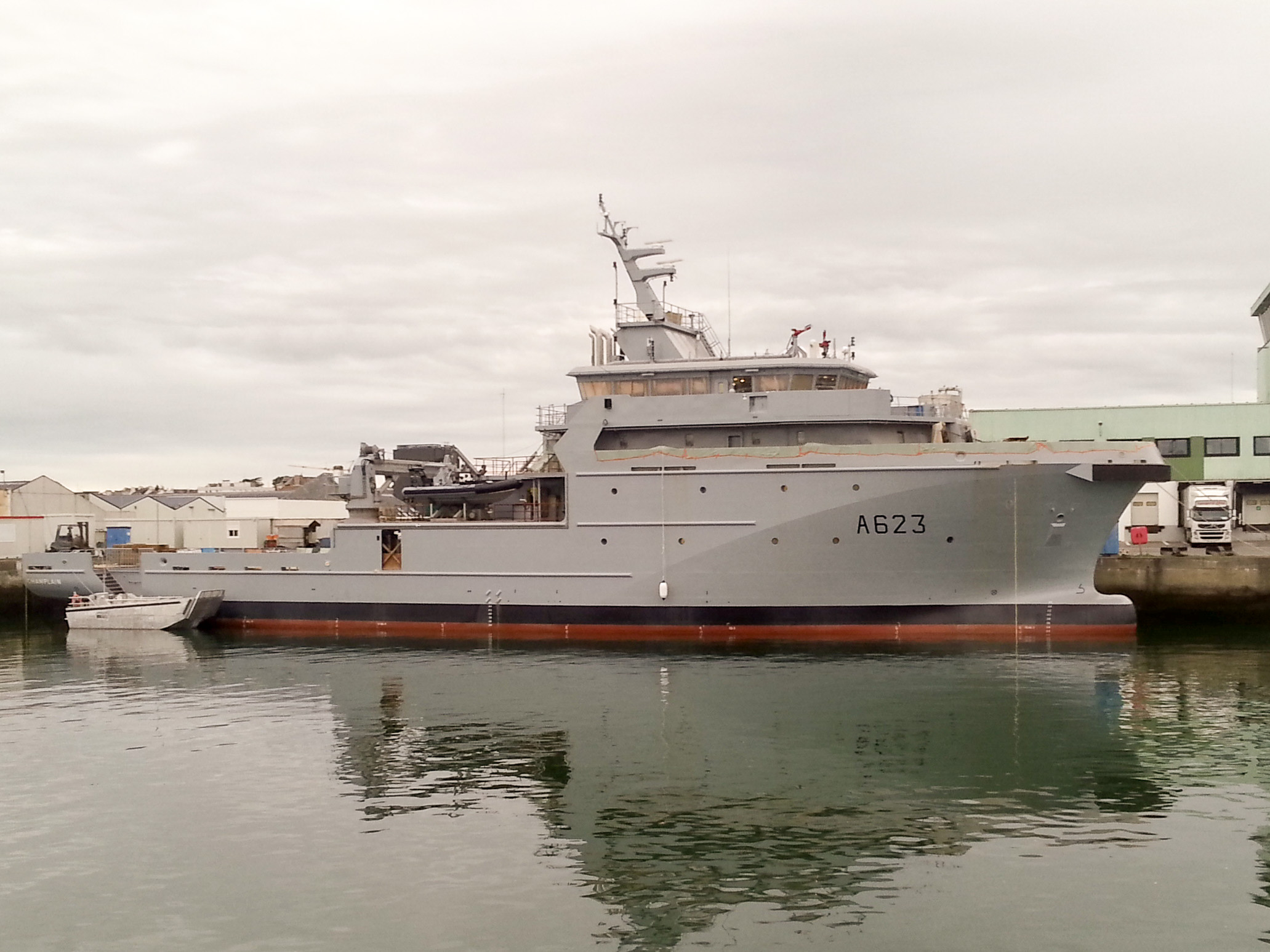
- Champlain in Concarneau before her launch, in September 2016

Class overview
- Name: Bâtiment multi-mission
- Builders: Kership (DCNS-Piriou joint venture), Concarneau
- Operators: Marine Nationale
- Preceded by: BATRAL-class landing ship
- Planned: 4
- Active: 4

General characteristics
- Type: Offshore patrol vessel
- Displacement: 1,500 tonnes (empty); 2,300 tonnes (full load)
- Length: 65 m (213 ft 3 in)
- Beam: 14 m (45 ft 11 in)
- Draught: 4.20 m (13 ft 9 in)
- Speed: 15 knots (28 km/h; 17 mph)
- Troops: 20
- Complement: 20
- Armament: 2 x 7.62 mm guns
- Aircraft carried: U010 Aliaca UAV (planned from 2027)
- Notes: 12-tonne crane

The D'Entrecasteaux class is a class of oceanic patrol ships of the French Navy. The ship's designation is Bâtiment multi-mission (B2M) in French, meaning "multi-mission ship", and sometimes dubbed the "Swiss Army knife of the Navy". The ship is designed to perform sovereignty, law enforcement and logistics missions (such as policing illegal fishing, offshore traffic and resource mining, assisting distressed ships, search and rescue, and contributing to the logistics of Overseas collectivities and departments.). The class replaced the aging BATRAL-class landing ships in some of these roles. The D'Entrecasteaux-class perform similar roles in French overseas territories that the four Loire-class ships perform in Metropolitan France.

Three units were initially planned, but a fourth one was ordered in early 2015, to cover the Mozambique Channel. The French Navy's first Bâtiment multi-mission (B2M) ship, d'Entrecasteaux, was delivered at the end of March 2016. The B2M vessels can be armed with two 12.7x99 mm (.50 cal.) machine guns.

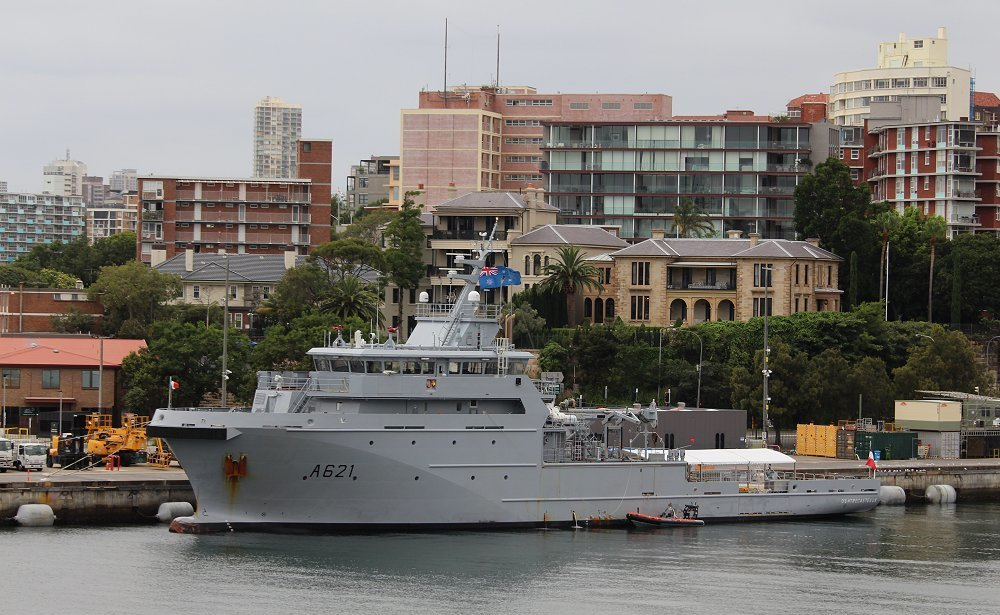
D'Entrecasteaux at Fleet Base East, Woolloomooloo during a visit to Sydney, Australia on 18 December 2016

== History ==
=== Missions and background ===
France holds the largest exclusive economic zones (EEZ), totalling one million km^{2} in the Indian Ocean and 1.7 million km^{2} in the Southern Ocean. To enforce law in these areas, the French Navy has deployed a number of ships suitable for low-intensity engagements and with flexible capabilities: BATRAL-class landing ships, P400-class patrol vessels and D'Estienne d'Orves-class avisos, all Cold War designs, have been deployed in this role, and stop-gap measures such as Albatros were taken. More recently, the French Navy has procured classes of ship specifically designed for law enforcement and public service in the EEZ, such as the Floréal-class frigates.

In the 2010s, the aging BATRAL, Jacques Cartier, based in Nouméa, was decommissioned in April 2013 and the decommissioning of Albatros in May 2015 led to the need to procure replacements for the naval stations of Port des Galets (La Réunion), Nouméa (New Caledonia), Dégrad des Cannes (Martinique) and Papeete (French Polynesia). In March 2006, the Service des Programmes Navals (SPN, "Naval Programme Service") started to study a replacement for the five BATRALs and for Albatros.

The ships initially envisioned would have been typed Bâtiments d'intervention et de souveraineté (BIS, "Intervention and Sovereignty Ships"); although they were to dispense with the amphibious capabilities of the BATRAL, they were to accommodate a company-sized force (120 men and 20 vehicles, including armoured vehicles). Four projects were evaluated, including the "MultiPurpose Projection Vessel" by CNIM, the "Echoship" by DCNS, the M.OPV by Piriou, and the UT 527 by Rolls-Royce Marine. In October 2013, a modified version of the M.OPV was co-contracted to Piriou and DCNS; a joint venture, Kership, was founded for the project.

Expenses of the contract, amounting to 100 million euro, were initially to be covered not only by the Ministry of Defence, but also by other branches of the government: 20% of the funds to acquire the ships and 50% of the maintenance would have been provided by other ministries. However, from July 2013, it was decided that the Ministry of Defence had to shoulder the burden alone.

=== Design ===
The design selected for the Bâtiment multi-mission eschews the amphibious capabilities of the previous BATRAL and the L-CAT design proposed by CNIM, similar to the Engin de débarquement amphibie rapide, for a concept of platform supply vessel, or anchor handling tug supply vessel. In line with most ship designs tasked for coastguard duty in the French Navy, the B2M will be built according to civilian standards; this was already the case notably for the Floréal class. The hulls are built in Poland, Piriou being tasked with the design of the ship proper and the finish in Concarneau, while DCNS work on the military aspects of the project.

The ships were to displace over 1,000 tonnes, have a length between 60 and 80 metres (200 and 260 ft), and machinery capable of 8,000 to 12,000 horsepower (5,966 to 8,948 kW).

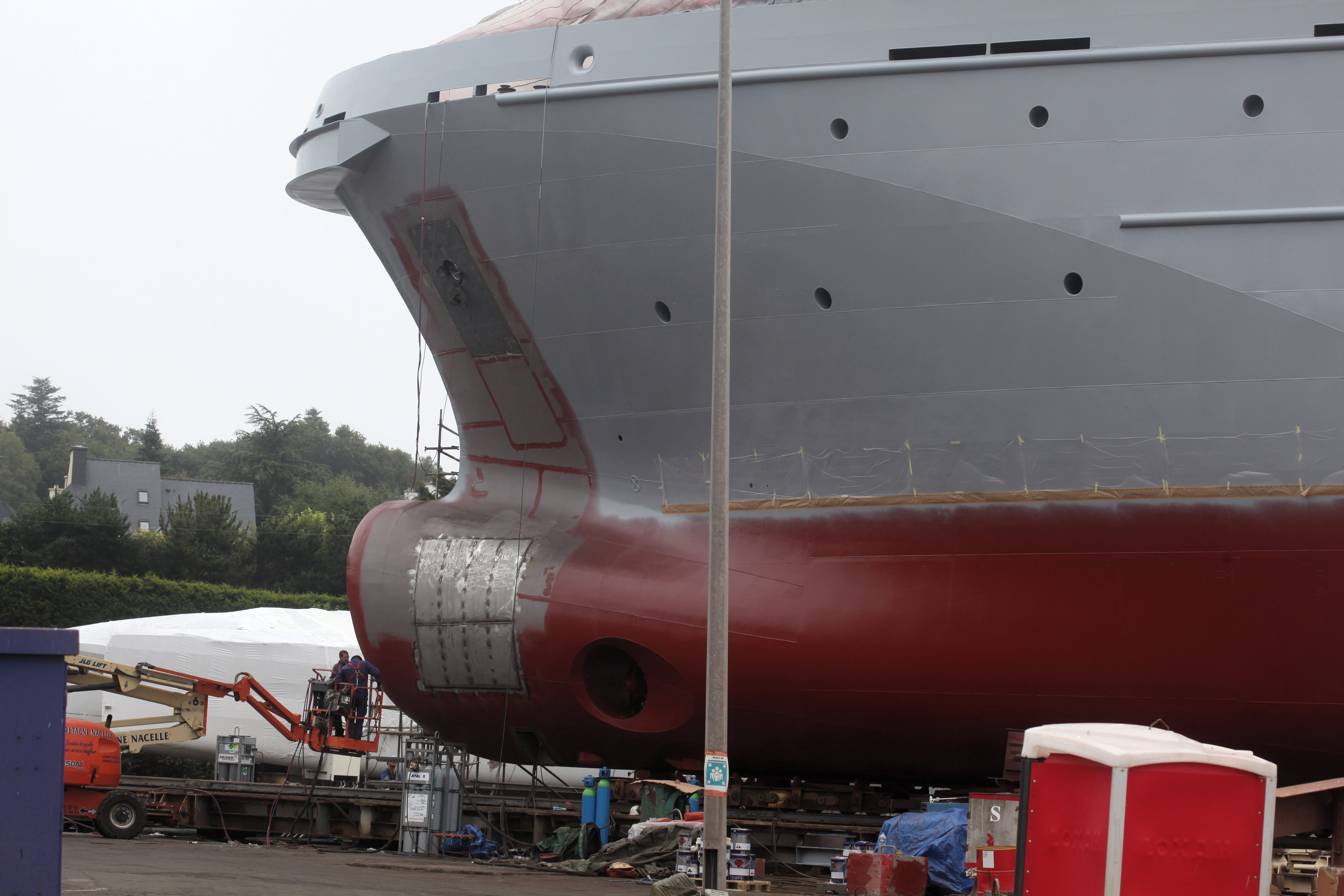
Bulbous bow and bow thruster

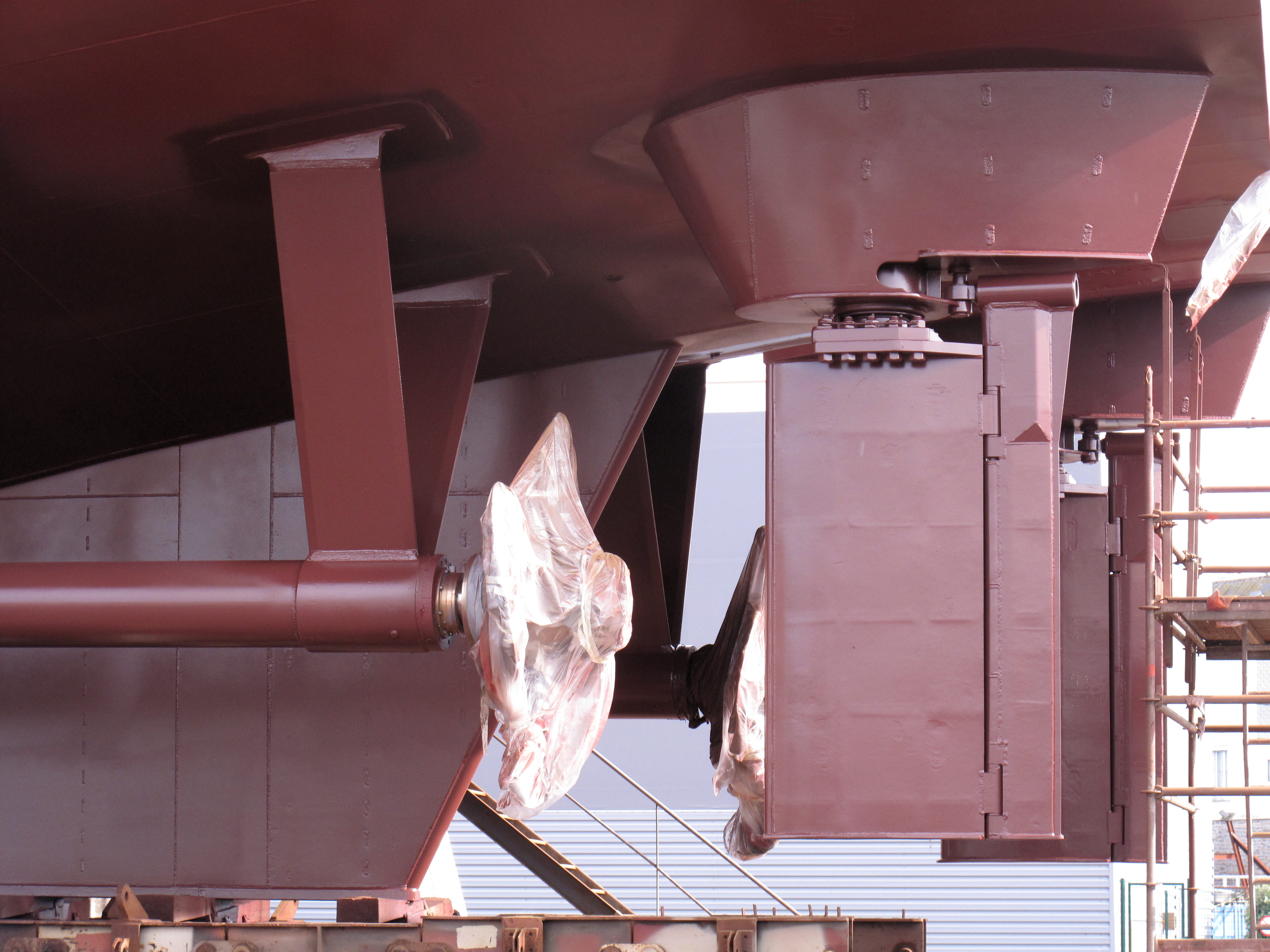
Rudder and propellers

== Features and capabilities ==
The B2M are designed for a range of low-intensity, high-endurance missions in the French EEZ, from bases in the Overseas collectivities. As such, they feature a relatively low maximum speed of 12 to 15 knots (22 to 28 km/h), but are able to operate for 30 days without resupply, and are designed for a high availability of 200 days at sea per year. One of their main task is maritime law enforcement, particularly in the domain of commercial fishing and against illegal immigration, Drug trafficking and piracy.

The B2M provide a limited capability of power projection, as they can ferry a 20-man force, along with equipment and two vehicles; as the missions of the B2M are joint between the various ministries responsible for the maritime actions of the State, these forces can belong to any arm of the French Military, to the Gendarmerie or the Police. They carry an 8-metre (26 ft) boat and several rigid-hulled inflatable boats, and can deploy frogmen as well as remotely operated underwater vehicles. The ship can also accommodate a medical team to be deployed during humanitarian emergencies.

To assist ships of distress, the B2M can develop a 30-tonne bollard pull and have extensive anti-fire capabilities. They furthermore feature a crane capable of lifting 12 tonnes with a 14-metre (46 ft) reach, or 10 tonnes at 17 metres (56 ft). This allows autonomous loading and unloading of standard containers, a useful capability for humanitarian operations in disaster areas.

The vertical takeoff and landing (VTOL) version of Airbus Helicopters’ U010 Aliaca unmanned aerial drone, ordered in 2026 to assist in offshore patrol tasks, is planned for service entry on vessels of the class in 2027.

== Operational service ==
D'Entrecasteaux was severely damaged by fire in July 2021. The loss of the ship for an undetermined period temporarily left the French Navy with no operational vessel in the waters around New Caledonia due to the simultaneous incapacitation of the surveillance frigate Vendémiaire and the patrol vessel La Glorieuse. To address the gap, her sister ship Bougainville was temporarily redeployed from Tahiti to New Caledonia. By early 2022, La Glorieuse was again active while D'Entrecasteaux was repaired and declared operational once again in May 2022.

Between January and March 2024, Champlain conducted a two month patrol in the Scattered Islands of the southern Indian Ocean. During the patrol she seized 1,600 kg (3,500 lb) of methamphetamine from a drug smuggling vessel.

In July 2026, in an exercise in Pacific waters, Bougainville carried out the first replenishment-at-sea for either vessel with the POM-class patrol boat Teriieroo A Teriierooiterai.

== Ships ==
Pennant no.	Name	Laid down	Launched	Commissioned	Homeport
French Navy
A621	D'Entrecasteaux	25 April 2014	31 July 2015	25 March 2016	Nouméa
A622	Bougainville	2015	26 February 2016	16 September 2016	Papeete
A623	Champlain	2015	22 August 2016	4 July 2017	Port-des-Galets
A624	Dumont d'Urville	July 2017		17 April 2020	Fort-de-France
