= B2M =

B2M may refer to:

- B2M (band), a musical band from the Tiwi Islands, Northern Territory, Australia
- B2M Entertainment, a South Korean music label
- Beta-2 microglobulin, a gene or protein
- Boyz II Men American R&B music group
- Business to many, businesses and consumers in marketing
- D'Entrecasteaux-class patrol ship, a French Navy ship type designated as Bâtiment multi-mission (B2M)
- Mitsubishi B2M, an aircraft
