= Gabonese Navy =

National Navy of Gabon
- Marine Nationale du Gabon
- Naval Jack of Gabon
- Active: 16 December 1960
- Country: Gabon
- Branch: Armed Forces of Gabon
- Headquarters: Libreville

The National Navy of Gabon (French: Marine Nationale du Gabon) is the naval branch of the Armed Forces of Gabon. It operates a few fast attack craft and patrol vessels to maintain security along its 800 km (500 mi)-long coastline.

== Overview ==
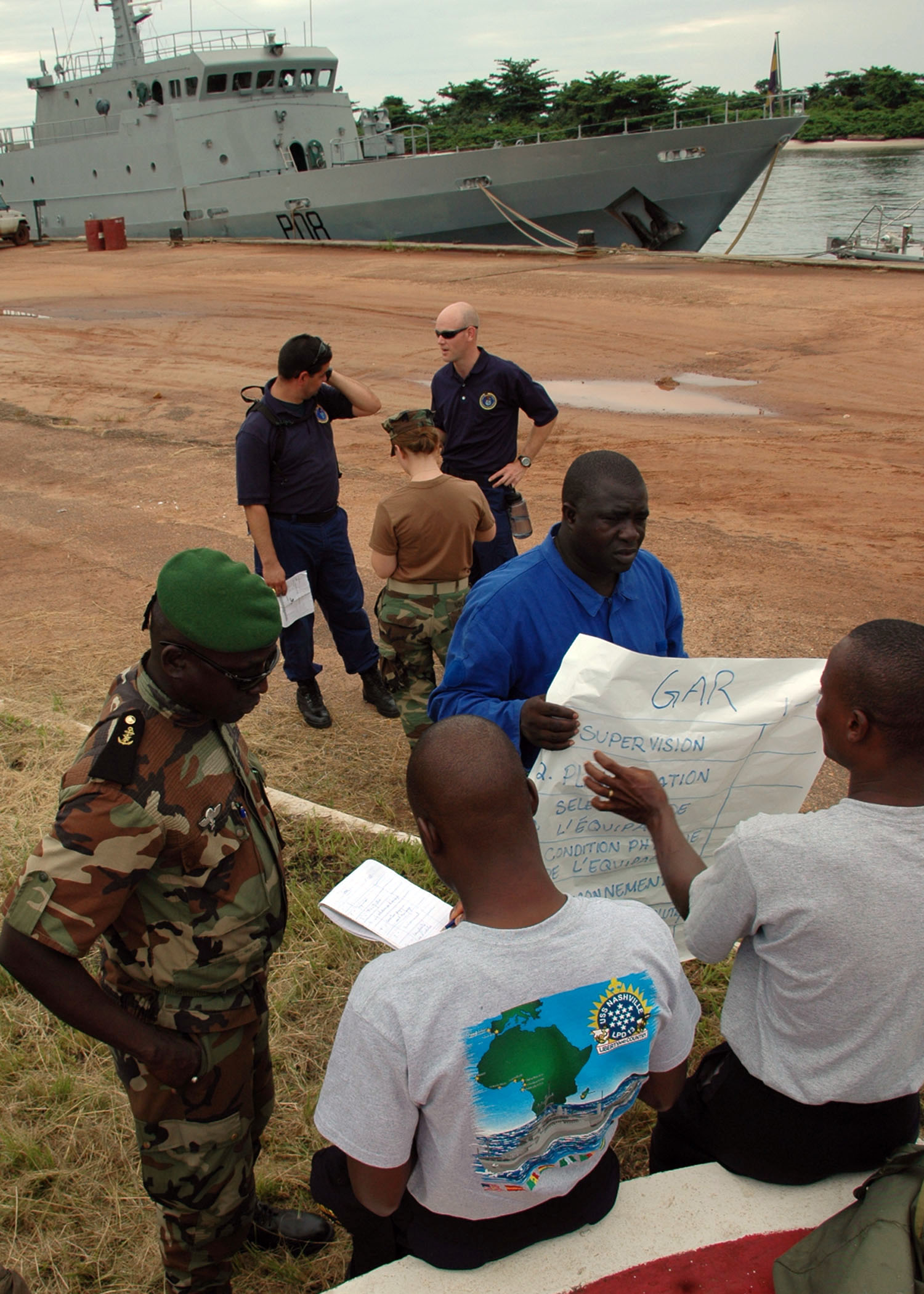
Sailors of the Gabonese navy (front) with US Coast Guardmen in 2009. In the background is Colonel Djoue Dabany, a P400-class patrol vessel

Created on 16 December 1960, the Gabonese Navy is tasked with controlling the coastal waters of Gabon (800 km (500 mi)-long coast). In 1983, the Navy became independent from the Gabon Army. Its headquarters is in Libreville and its two naval bases are in Port-Gentil and Mayunba.

Gabon has a 480 nautical miles (890 km; 550 mi) coastline along the Atlantic Ocean. The principal port of the nation is in Libreville and Gabon claims a 12-nautical-mile (22 km; 14 mi) territorial sea limit and a 200-nautical-mile (370 km; 230 mi) exclusive economic zone (EEZ). However, jurisdiction over the EEZ is in flux as the limits have not been defined, overlapping with Annobón which belongs to Equatorial Guinea and São Tomé and Príncipe.

A Marines unit, the Compagnie de Fusiliers Marins (COFUSMA), was created in 1984.

== List of ships of the Gabon Navy ==
The Gabon Navy primarily utilises fast attack craft and patrol vessels to monitor its coastal waters.

- Général d'Armée Ba-Oumar, a P400-class patrol vessel
- Colonel Djoue-Dabany, a P400-class patrol vessel
- Bivigou Nziengui, transferred from France to the Gabonese Navy in 2014 (former French Navy P-400 class vessel La Tapageuse)
- General Nazaire Boulingui, a fast attack craft that entered service in 1978.
- President El Hadj Omar Bongo, a BATRAL landing ship that entered service on November 26, 1984 and was decommissioned in 2016.

Also, two French-built Kership offshore patrol vessels are on order.
