= Castor-class patrol vessel =

Class of patrol vessels of the Belgian Navy

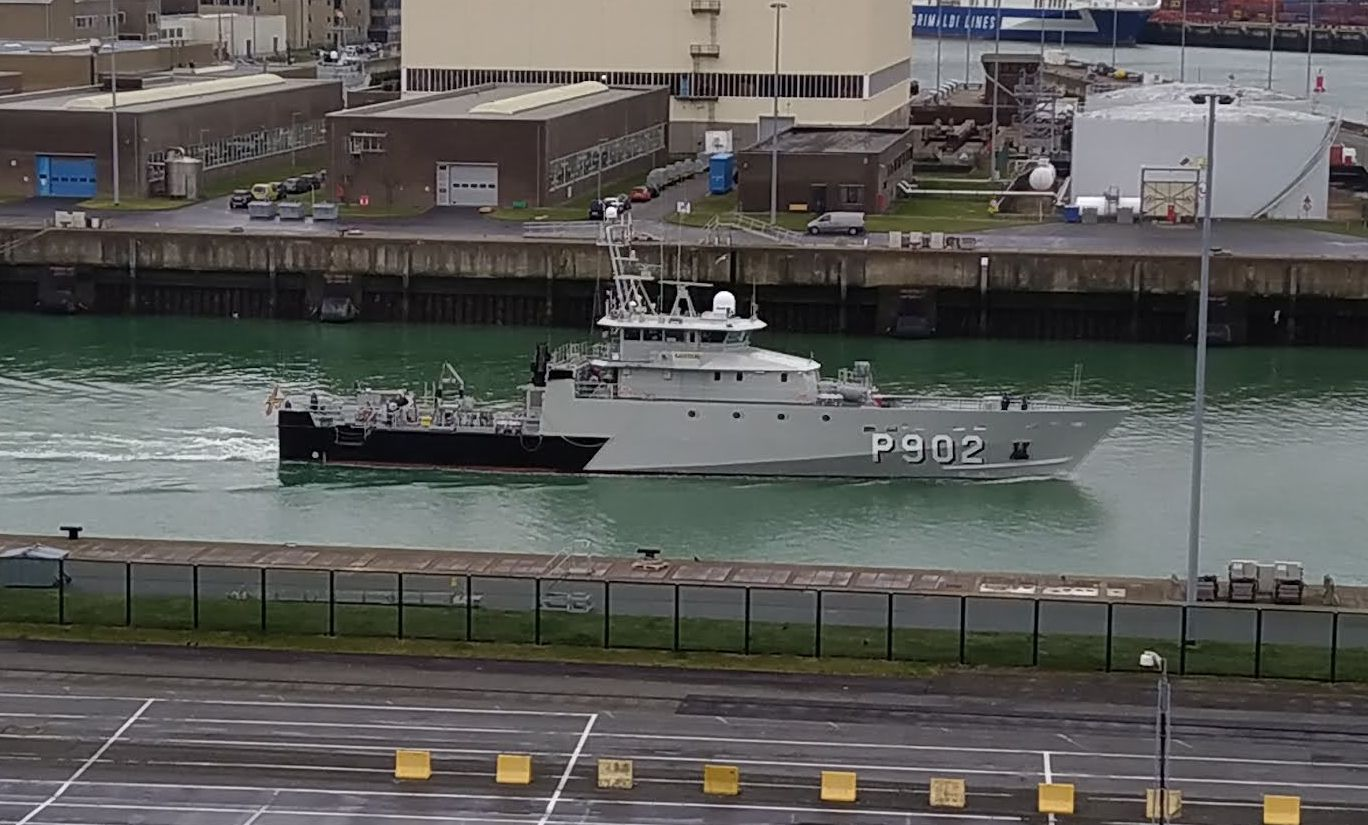
- Pollux in Zeebrugge

Class overview
- Name: Castor-class coastal patrol vessel
- Builders: Socarenam, Boulogne-sur-Mer, France
- Operators: Belgian Navy
- Cost: €26.6 million (2013) (equivalent to €32.35 million in 2025) for 2 units
- Built: 2013–2015, 2025-2027
- In commission: 2014–present
- Planned: 3
- Building: 1
- Completed: 2
- Active: 2

General characteristics
- Type: Patrol vessel
- Displacement: 455 t (448 long tons) full load
- Length: 53.50 m (175 ft 6 in)
- Beam: 9.50 m (31 ft 2 in)
- Draught: 3.19 m (10 ft 6 in)
- Propulsion: 2 × 2,880 kW (3,860 hp) MTU diesel engines
- Speed: 21 knots (39 km/h; 24 mph) (maximum)
- Boats & landing craft carried: 2 × RHIBs
- Crew: 15
- Armament: 12.7 mm FN Herstal Sea deFNder

The Castor class is a class of coastal patrol vessels in service with the Belgian Navy, used primarily for patrol of the Belgian exclusive economic zone of the North Sea.

== History ==
In January 2012 Belgian Minister of Defence Pieter De Crem presented plans for the future of the navy. In these plans a budget of €34 million was set aside for two Ready Duty Ships. These plans where approved by the Belgian Government in May of that same year. Both Damen Group and Socarenam responded to an invitation to tender. Damen proposed a variant of their Stan Patrol vessel which was already in use by a number of navies. However, in December 2012, an order for two ships was placed with Socarenam for a far lower price (€26.6 million ) than the initial budget. Construction of the first ship began in June 2013.

Castor was delivered to the navy in 2014. She was followed by Pollux in 2015.

In March 2023 it was revealed that the Belgian Navy was looking into acquiring a third patrol vessel which could be a third Castor-class ship. A decision was expected in summer 2023.

In November 2024, NAVALNEWS reported that the Belgian Ministry of Defense had completed negotiations with the shipyard in France Socarenam for the construction of a third ship. The third vessel, now named Vega, was launched on 2 April 2026. She will remain at the shipyard for the out fitting stage of the build.

== Ships in class ==
Pennant no.	Name	Builder	Launched	Commissioned	Status	Picture	Notes
P901	Castor	Socarenam, Boulogne-sur-Mer, France	14 April 2014	10 July 2014	In active service		
P902	Pollux	Socarenam, Boulogne-sur-Mer, France	22 December 2014	6 May 2015	In active service		
P903	Vega	Socarenam, Boulogne-sur-Mer, France	2 April 2026	2027 (planned)	Fitting out		
