= Opération Séisme Haiti 2010 =

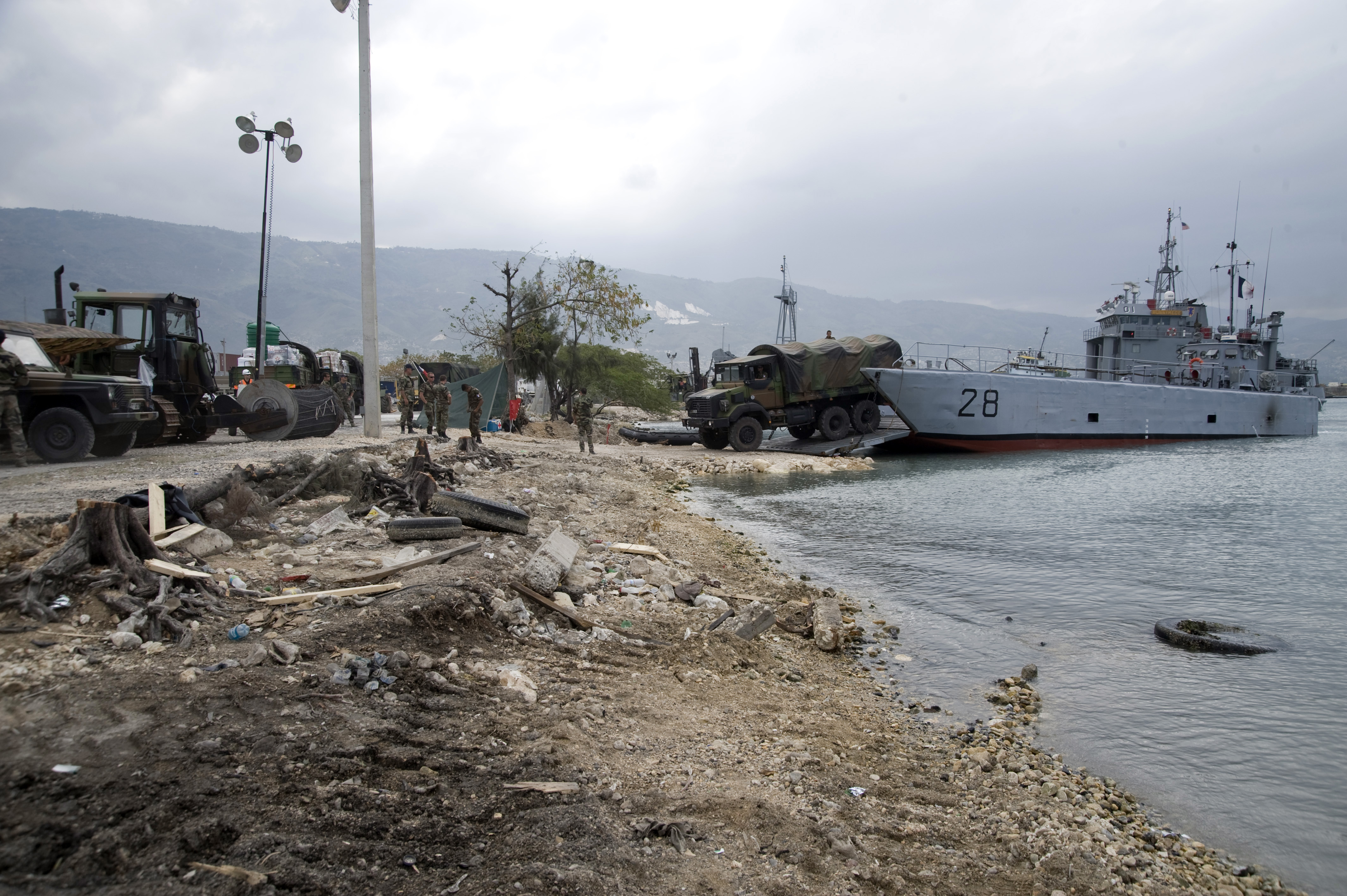
The French military off-loads heavy equipment at the Port international de Port-au-Prince on January 25, 2010.

Opération Séisme Haiti 2010 (Operation Haiti Earthquake 2010) is France's military relief operation for the 12 January 2010 earthquake.

The priorities for the mission are rescue efforts, search for the missing, medical aid, security, retrieving French citizens, organizing humanitarian aid, and delivery.

The operation started on Wednesday 13 January 2010.

== Force composition ==
- 3 Casa aircraft from the Franche-Comté squadron
- 2 Hercules transport aircraft from the Franche-Comté squadron
- 2 navy ships,
  - BATRAL Francis Garnier
  - amphibious assault ship Siroco
    - 2 Puma helicopters
    - 2 Gazelle helicopters
- 1 military Airbus A310
- 1er régiment du Service militaire adapté (RSMA)
- elements of the 33e Régiment d'infanterie de marine (RIMa)
- a Dash 8 airliner

== Mission timeline ==
- 14 January 2010, Siroco left for Haiti.
- 15 January 2010, 240 personnel and 30 tonnes of freight were on the ground, and 239 French nationals had been rescued.
- 16 January 2010, a field hospital was delivered.
- 19 January 2010, 400 personnel, mostly police and civil rescue units, and 48 tonnes of freight were delivered by the mission. 500 French and European nationals have been evacuated. Francis Garnier left port in Antilles, making for Haiti.
- 20 January 2010 Francis Garnier had docked at the Port international de Port-au-Prince and started offloading relief supplies.
- 24 January 2010, Siroco arrived at Port-au-Prince and anchored in the bay, delivering 2000 tonnes of aid. It is equipped with four helicopters, two landing craft, two operating theatres and 50 hospital beds.
- 27 January 2010, Francis Garnier left to return to Fort-de-France.
- 28 January 2010, about 600 troops are engaged in relief operations. Over 220 tonnes of aid has been delivered.
- 30 January 2010, over 126 have been medevaced to Fort-de-France and Pointe-à-Pitre. Over 38 operations have been performed, by the team of 21 at French military field hospital and aboard Siroco.
- Elements of 33e RIMa have set up in Port-au-Prince. The 1er RSMA has been setting up refugee tent camps.
- 20 February 2010, Siroco ends its mission, leaves Haiti, and heads for its home port of Toulon.
- 5 March 2010, Siroco arrives home in Toulon.

== See also ==
- Operation Hestia - Canadians counterpart
- Operation Unified Response - American counterpart
