= Patrouilleur Outre-mer =

Class of offshore patrol vessel for the French Navy

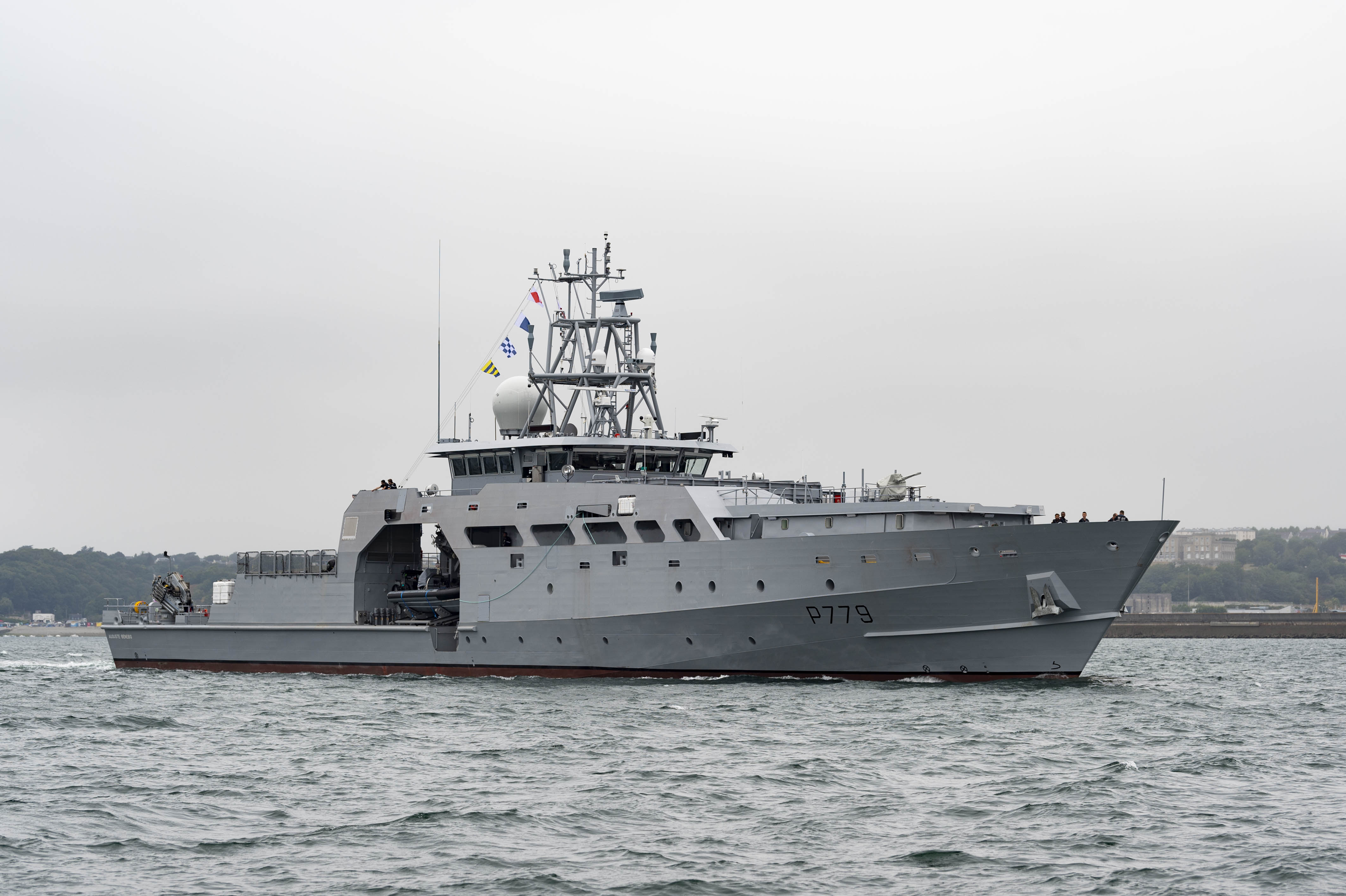
- Auguste Bénébig

Class overview
- Name: Patrouilleur Outre-mer
- Builders: Socarenam
- Operators: Marine Nationale
- Preceded by: P400-class patrol vessel
- In service: July 2023 – present
- In commission: From May 2023
- Planned: 6
- Building: 1
- Completed: 5
- Active: 4

General characteristics
- Type: Offshore patrol vessel
- Displacement: 1,300 tonnes (1,300 long tons)
- Length: 80 m (262 ft 6 in)
- Beam: 11.8 m (38 ft 9 in)
- Draught: 3.5 m (11 ft 6 in)
- Speed: 24 knots (44 km/h; 28 mph)
- Range: 5,500 nmi (10,200 km; 6,300 mi)
- Boats & landing craft carried: 2 8 m (26 ft) RHIB
- Capacity: 29 passengers
- Complement: 30
- Armament: 1 Nexter Narwhal 20 mm remotely operated autocannon; 2 M2 Browning 12.7 mm machine guns; 2 FN MAG 7.62 mm machine guns
- Aircraft carried: Survey Copter Aliaca UAV

The Patrouilleurs Outre-mer (POM), or Félix Éboué class, are a class of offshore patrol vessels of the French Navy. They are to be based at Nouméa, Tahiti and La Réunion, replacing the P400-class patrol vessels all of which were withdrawn from service by 2023. At 1,300 tonnes, the POM class ships have four times the displacement of the P400 and possess a wider range of capabilities. The lead ship, Auguste Bénébig, was commissioned in May 2023, with delivery of all six units ordered expected by 2027.

== History ==
=== Conception ===
Work conducted in the framework of the BATSIMAR programme and the 2017 Strategic Study for National Defence and Security determined that protecting French overseas regions required capabilities of opposing terrorist action and threats of encroachment. They defined two families of patrol vessels: new generation high sea patrol vessels (patrouilleurs de haute mer de nouvelle génération, PHM-NG), or Oceanic Patrol Vessel; and Overseas Patrol Vessels (Patrouilleurs Outre-mer, POM). The POM are designed to protect territories and conduct coast guard duties, without significant offensive armament. The Direction générale de l'Armement (DGA) issued an invitation to tender for construction in August 2018.

=== Order ===
On 3 November 2019, during the Assises de l'économie de la mer, President Emmanuel Macron announced that the Ministry of Armed Forces had assigned the contract for building the six POM to Socarenam, of Boulogne-sur-Mer. Socarenam had previously won the tender for building the Patrouilleurs Antilles-Guyane (PAG) of the Confiance type. DGA issued the official order to Socarenam on 24 December 2019.

The order for design, building and maintenance was published on 12 February 2020. It was assigned jointly to Socarenam and CNN-MCO, of Brest, for a total of 223,939,897 Euros excluding VAT.

=== Construction ===
The POM are named in honour of Free French fighters from the overseas regions where the ships are to be based. The ceremony for the beginning of the construction of the first ship, Auguste Bénébig, took place on 8 October 2020 during a visit of Armed Forces Minister Florence Parly at the Socarenam shipyard in Saint-Malo. The ship was launched on 15 October 2021 at Saint-Malo, and towed to Boulogne-sur-Mer where she arrived on 18 October for her fitting out. She started trials on 26 July 2022, partly from the naval base in Brest. She was commissioned in July 2023 after arriving in Nouméa.

== Characteristics ==
The Félix Éboué-class vessels displace 1,300 tons fully loaded., with a length of 80 metres (262 ft 6 in), a beam of 11.8 m (38 ft 9 in), and draught of 3.5 m (11 ft 6 in). The crew is made up of 30 sailors, but they can accommodate 29 passengers and support combat divers. They are designed to operate in strong heat and high hygrometry during thirty days, with their own craning capabilities. They have two 8 m (26 ft) swift inflatable boats and a Survey Copter Aliaca UAV. The drone, capable of up to three-hour missions over a 50-kilometre (31 mi) range, is launched by catapult and recovered automatically via a net. Eleven Aliaca UAS systems are being delivered to the French Navy by 2023 and thirteen more by 2025.

The ships are fitted with a Lyncea combat system made by Nexeya. The same system has been installed on Floréal-class and D'Estienne d'Orves-class patrol vessels since 2009. Surveillance radars are made by Hensoldt. Armament comprises a Nexter Narwhal 20 mm (0.79 in) autogun at the bow, and four mounts for 12.7 mm (0.50 in) and 7.62 mm (0.300 in) machine guns.

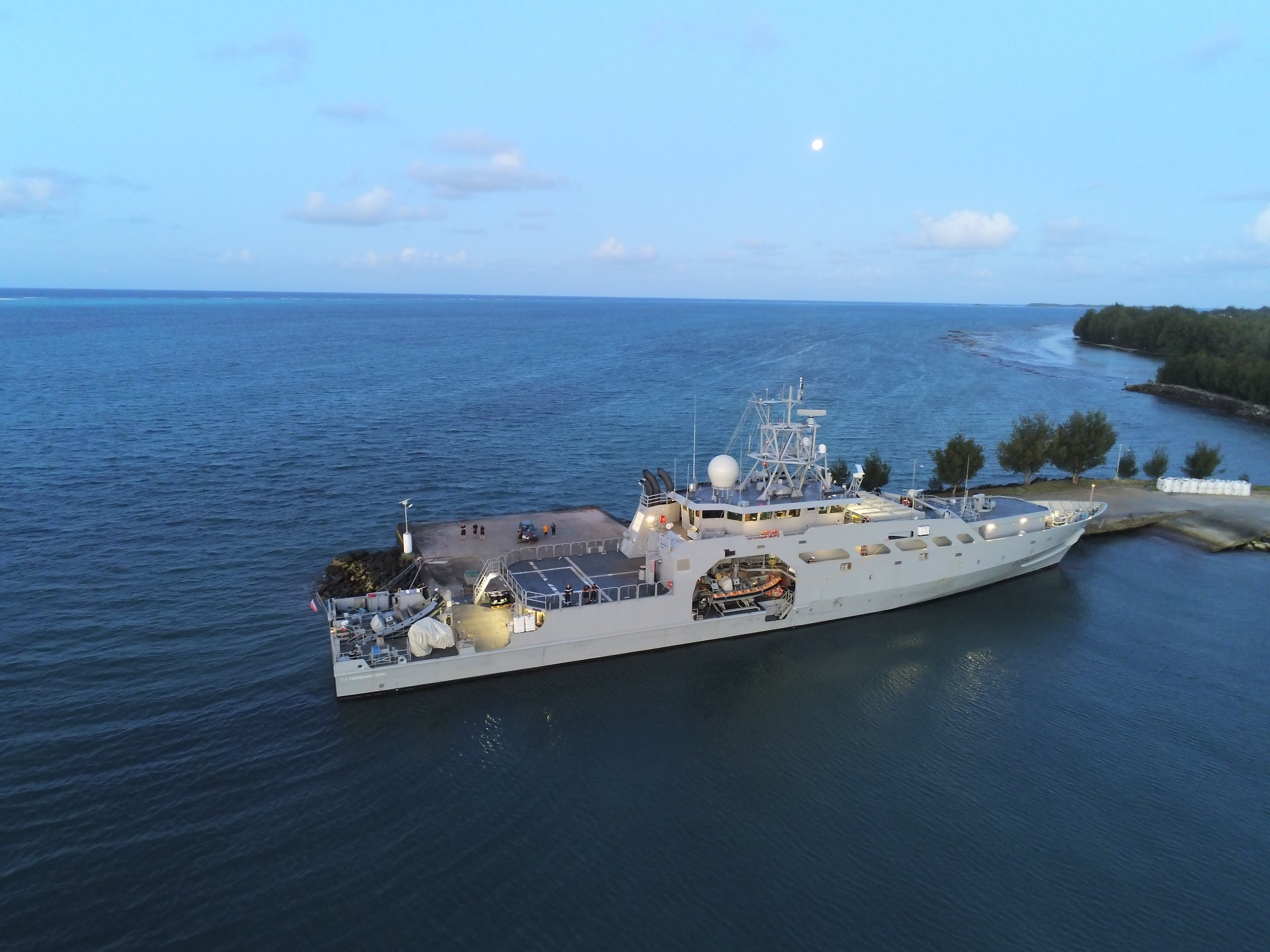
Teriieroo a Teriierooiterai

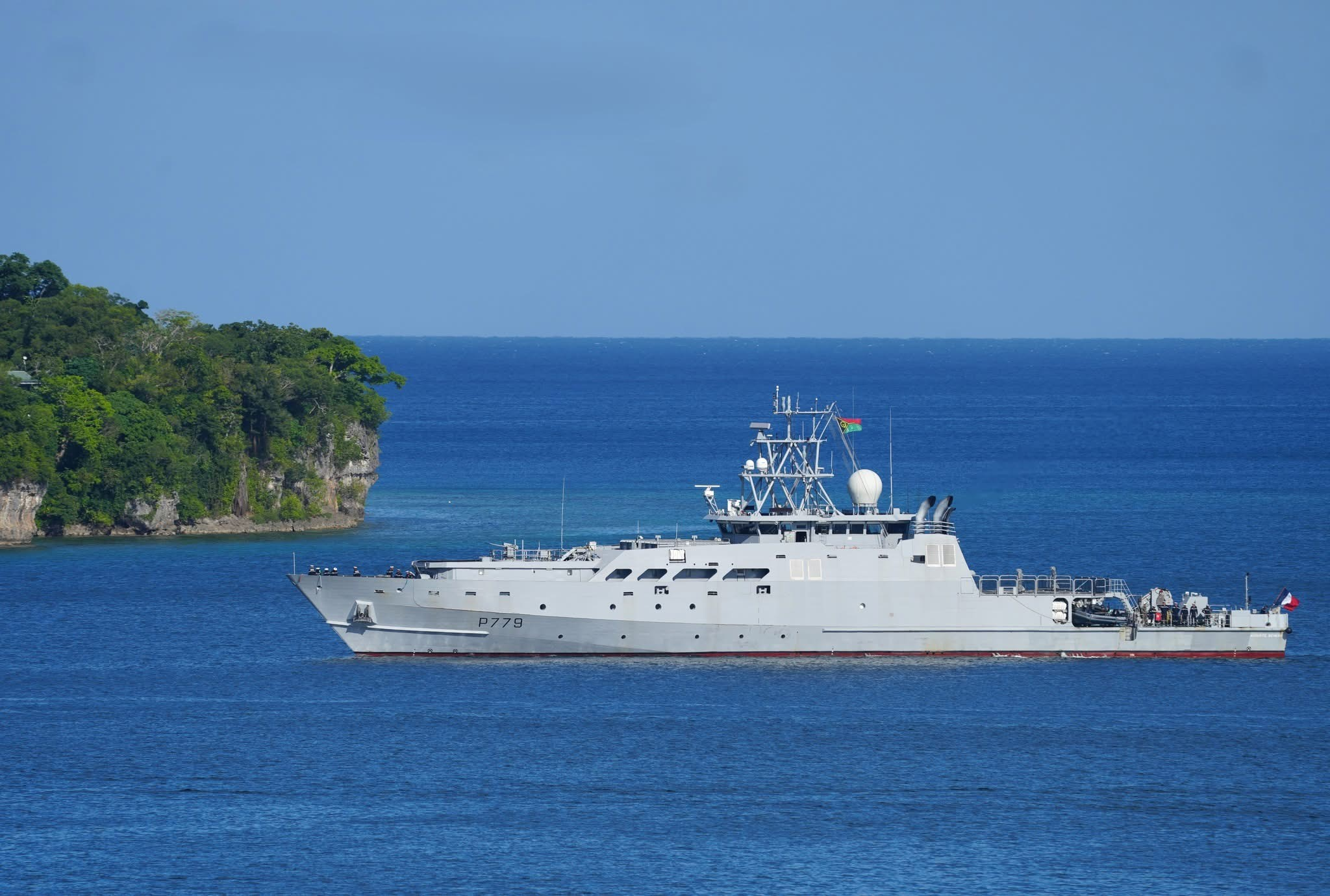
Auguste Bénébig

== Ships in class ==
Six patrol vessels are planned for the French Navy. The first unit began her transit to her base at Nouméa in New Caledonia in January 2023, arrived in early April and was commissioned in July. A second vessel, Teriieroo a Teriierooiterai, sailed for her new base at Papeete in March 2024 and arrived in May after rounding Cape Horn. She was commissioned in July 2024. A further ship (Auguste Techer) was delivered in August 2025 and is based at La Réunion. The fourth vessel, Jean Tranape, arrived in Nouméa in June 2026. These will be followed by two additional vessels, one more each at Tahiti and Réunion. The ships are replacing the P400-class patrol boats as well as the patrol boats Le Malin and Arago in the Pacific and Indian Ocean regions.

Hull number	Name	Construction start	Launching	Trials	Delivery	Commissioning	Home port
P779	Auguste Bénébig	8 October 2020	15 October 2021	Summer 2022	5 May 2023	25 July 2023	Nouméa
P780	Teriieroo a Teriierooiterai	June 2021	5 September 2022	Fall 2023	23 May 2024	18 July 2024	Papeete
P781	Auguste Techer	April 2022	22 December 2023	Fall 2024	25 August 2025	17 October 2025	Réunion
P782	Jean Tranape	October 2022	11 January 2025	Fall 2025	10 July 2026	14 September 2026	Nouméa
P783	Philippe Bernardino	2023	11 October 2025	Fall 2026	2027		Papeete
P784	Félix Éboué	2023/24	9 October 2026		2027/28		Réunion

== Operational Service ==
In July 2026, in an exercise in Pacific waters, Teriieroo a Teriierooiterai carried out the first replenishment-at-sea for either vessel with the D'Entrecasteaux-class patrol ship, Bougainville.

== See also ==
- List of active French Navy ships
