= Naval base =

Military port for naval ships and assets

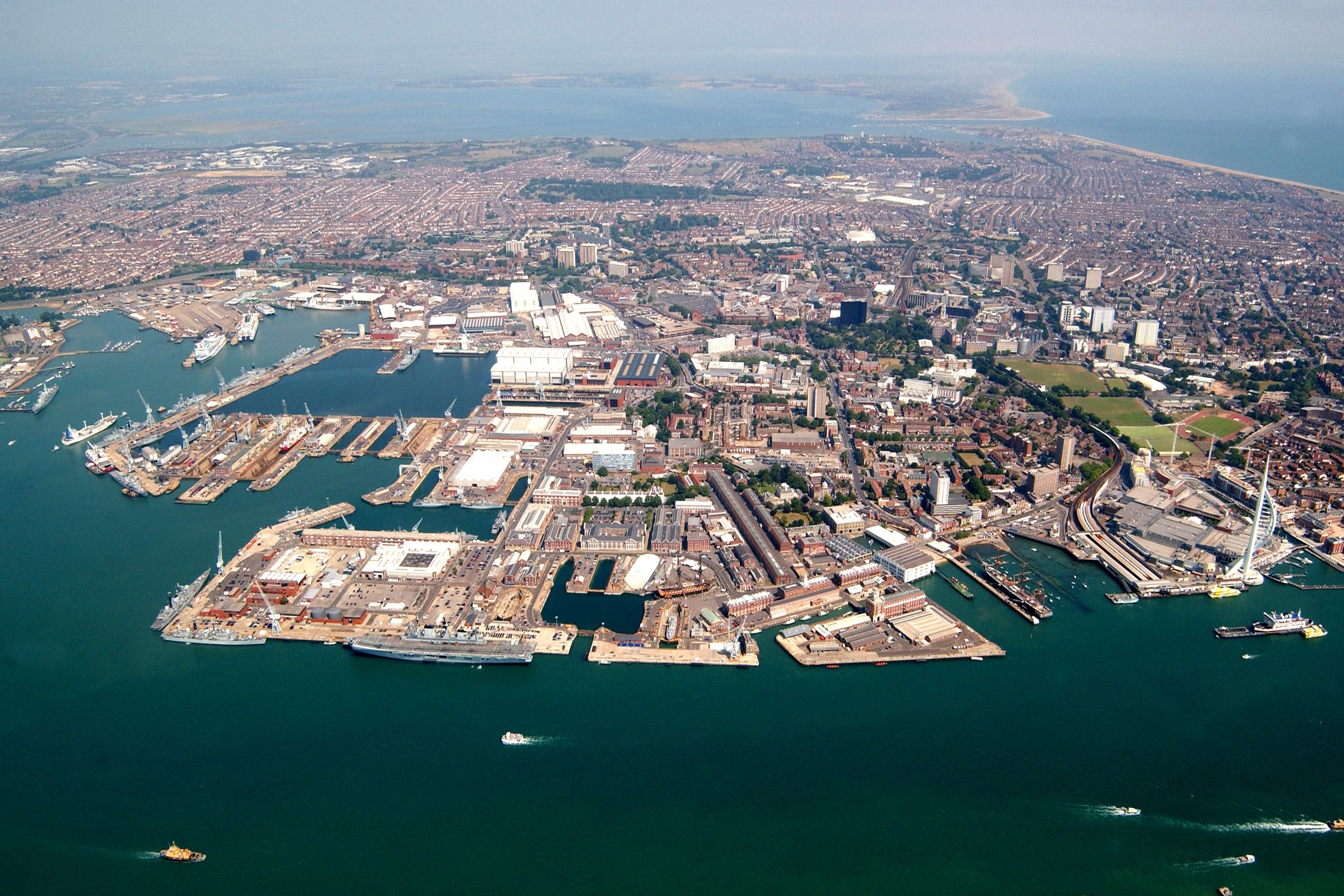
An aerial view of HMNB Portsmouth taken in 2005.

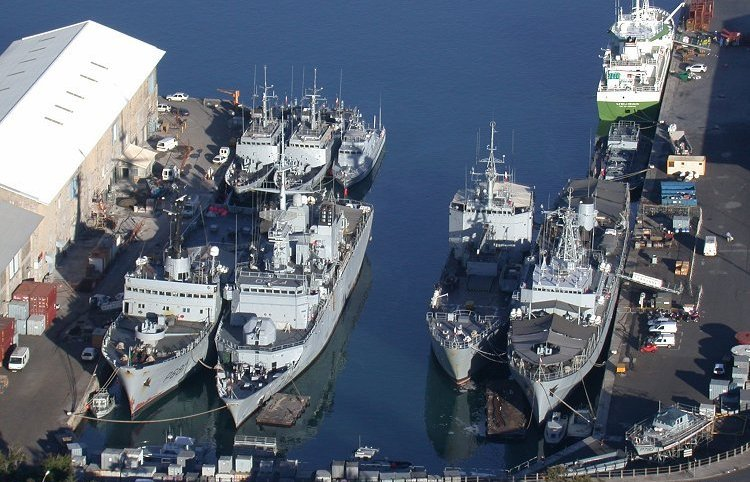
French Navy ships at Réunion: (from left) the patrol ship Albatros, frigate Floréal, P400 La Rieuse and La Boudeuse, Gendarmerie Navale's Jonquille, BATRAL La Grandière and the Garonne, behind an oiler, and the swift boat Vétiver (outside the water).

A naval base, navy base, or military port is a military base, where warships and naval ships are docked when they have no mission at sea or need to restock. Ships may also undergo repairs. Some naval bases are temporary homes to aircraft that usually stay on ships but are undergoing maintenance while the ship is in port.

In the United States, the United States Department of the Navy's General Order No. 135 issued in 1911 as a formal guide to naval terminology described a naval station as "any establishment for building, manufacturing, docking, repair, supply, or training under control of the Navy. It may also include several establishments". A naval base, by contrast, was "a point from which naval operations may be conducted".

In most countries, naval bases are expressly named and identified as such.

One peculiarity of the Royal Navy and certain other navies which closely follow British naval traditions is the concept of the stone frigate: a naval base on land that is named like a ship. Certain facilities were often initially housed on hulks as a cost-saving measure and were later moved to land but kept their traditional names.

== See also ==
- Submarine base
- Airbase
