= French landing ship Francis Garnier =

Light ferry ship

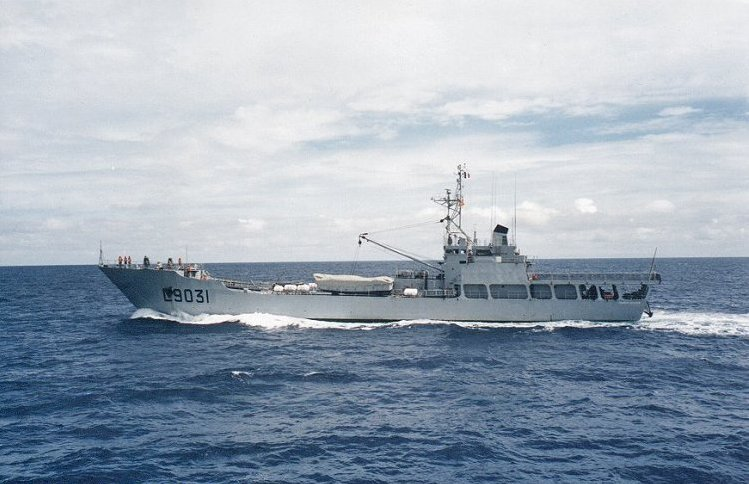
- BATRAL Francis Garnier

History

France
- Name: Francis Garnier
- Namesake: Francis Garnier
- Laid down: 1973
- Launched: 17 November 1973
- Commissioned: 21 June 1974
- Decommissioned: 16 February 2011
- Home port: Fort de France (1974 - 2000); Toulon (2000 on)
- Identification: L9031
- Fate: Scrapped August 2017

General characteristics
- Class & type: BATRAL
- Displacement: 770 t; 1330 t fully loaded
- Length: 80 m (262 ft 6 in)
- Beam: 13 m (42 ft 8 in)
- Draught: 3 m (9 ft 10 in)
- Propulsion: 2 diesel SACM Wärtsilä UD 33 V12 M4, 3600 hp (2650 kW), 2 4-bladed propellers
- Speed: 16 knots (30 km/h)
- Range: 4,500 nautical miles (8,330 km) at 13 knots (24 km/h)
- Endurance: 15 days without passengers; 10 days with passengers
- Boats & landing craft carried: 2 LCVP; 2 whaleboats; one 10-seat and one 6-seat Zodiac
- Capacity: 2 × 138-man rooms; 12 vehicles
- Complement: 3 officers; 15 petty officers; 26 quarter-masters
- Sensors & processing systems: 1 DECCA 1226 navigation radar; Inmarsat system
- Armament: 2 × 40 mm anti-air guns; 2 × 12.7 mm machine guns; 2 × 81mm mortars
- Aircraft carried: landing point of a 6-tonne helicopter

The BATRAL ("Light ferry ship") Francis Garnier (L9031) is the second of a series of five vessels. She was launched on 17 November 1973 and commissioned on 24 October 1974. She is the fifth vessel of the French Navy named in honour of the officer and explorer Francis Garnier.

The BATRAL vessels are able to ferry over 400 tons of matériel, in the hangar and on the deck. Loading and unloading can be done from a harbour or from a beach. Two flat-bottom vessels allow unloading 50 men and light vehicles each. The accommodations are designed for a Guépard-type intervention unit (5 officers, 15 petty officers and 118 men), or for typical company-sized armoured units.

A helicopter landing deck allows landing for light helicopters, and transfer from and to heavy helicopters.

She is based in Fort Saint Louis in Martinique. She has been used for humanitarian relief for thirty years, intervening on hurricane and tempest scenes in the Caraibs and Guyana. She is also part in the force projection system for interarm and internal operations, notably being engaged with the aeronaval group of Charles de Gaulle during Opération Héracles, the French naval component of the invasion of Afghanistan.

Francis Garnier was ordered to assist the humanitarian efforts following the 2010 Haiti earthquake as part of Opération Séisme Haiti 2010. She left Martinique carrying 60 Army personnel, land vehicles and excavators; and various relief shipments.

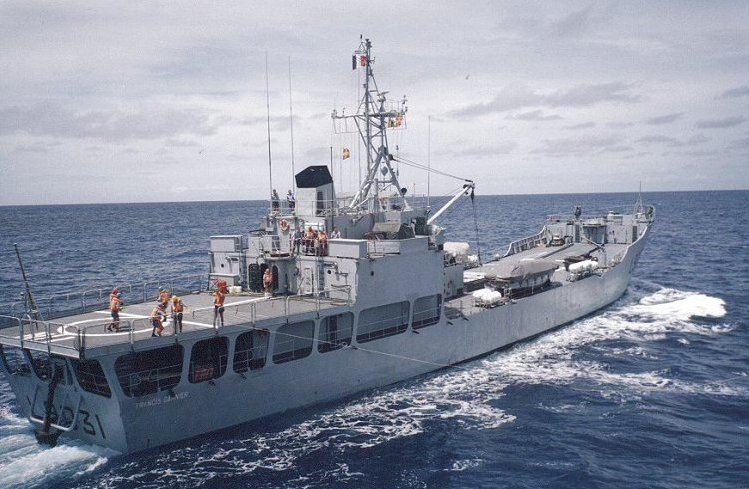

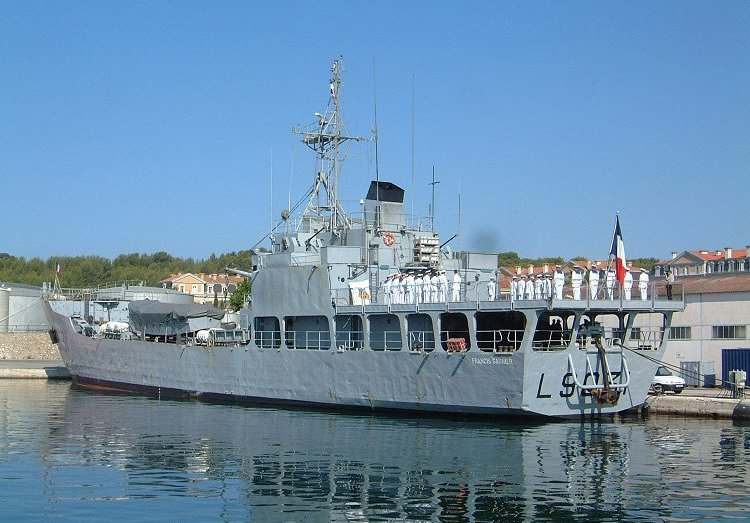

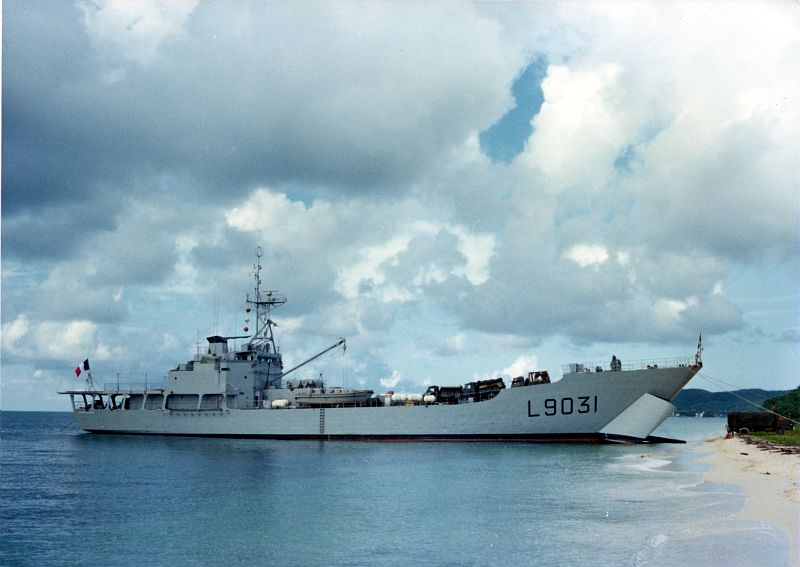
