= Belgian patrol vessel Pollux =

Belgian Castor-class patrol vessel

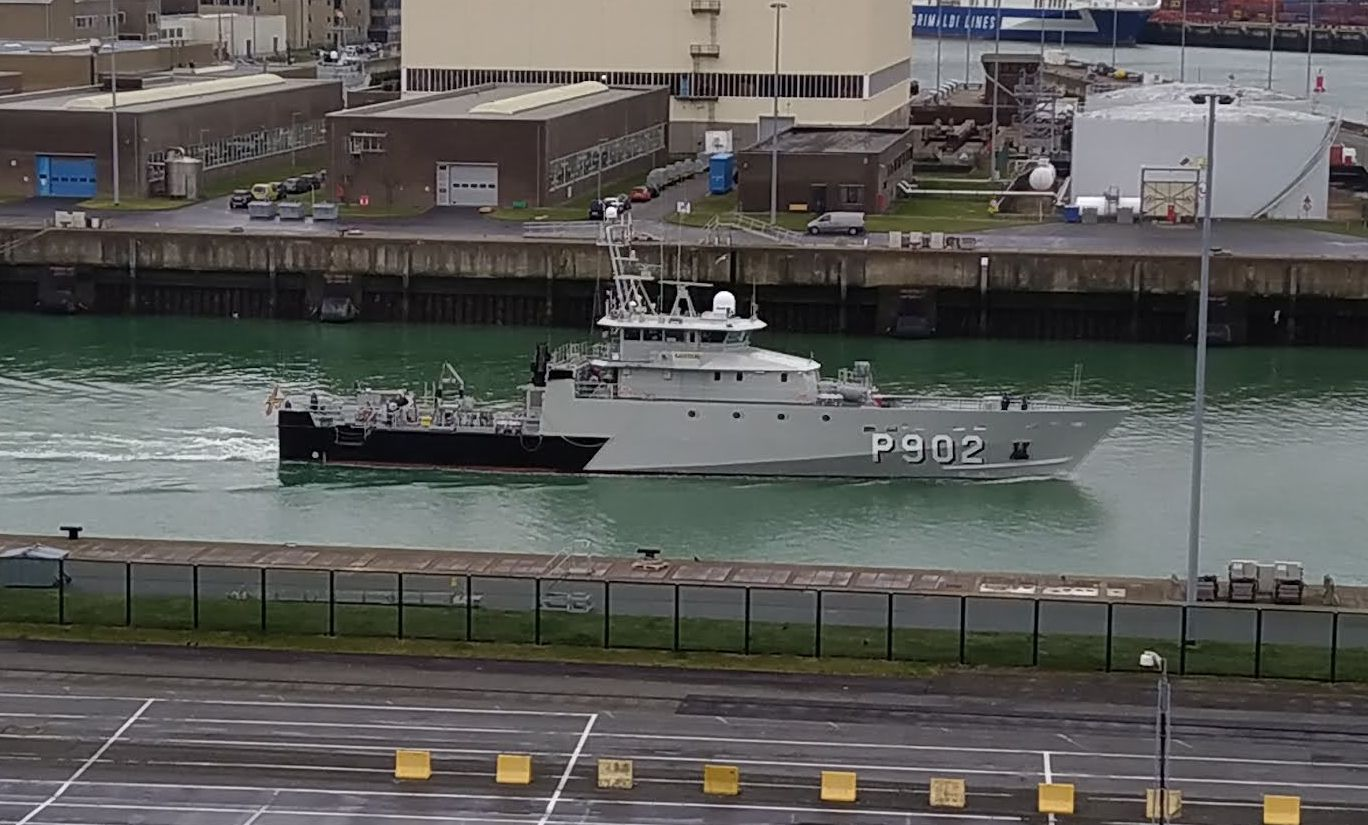

History

Belgium
- Name: Pollux
- Namesake: Pollux
- Operator: Belgian Navy
- Builder: Socarenam yard, Boulogne-sur-Mer, France
- Launched: 22 December 2014
- Commissioned: 6 May 2015
- Identification: MMSI number: 205661000; Hull number: P902
- Status: Active

General characteristics
- Type: Castor-class patrol vessel
- Displacement: 455 t (448 long tons) full load
- Length: 53.50 m (175.5 ft)
- Beam: 9.50 m (31.2 ft)
- Draught: 3.19 m (10.5 ft)
- Propulsion: 2x 2880KW MTU diesel engines
- Speed: 21 knots (39 km/h) (maximum)
- Boats & landing craft carried: 2x RHIBs
- Crew: 15
- Armament: 12.7 mm FN Herstal Sea deFNder

Pollux is a Castor-class patrol vessel of the Belgian Navy.

== Construction and career ==
Pollux was launched on 22 December 2014 at the Socarenam yard in Boulogne-sur-Mer, France. It was commissioned in the Belgian Navy by heir apparent Princess Elisabeth on 6 May 2015. Pollux was the last ship in the Castor-class, and has pennant number P902.
