= Mahury =

River in French Guiana

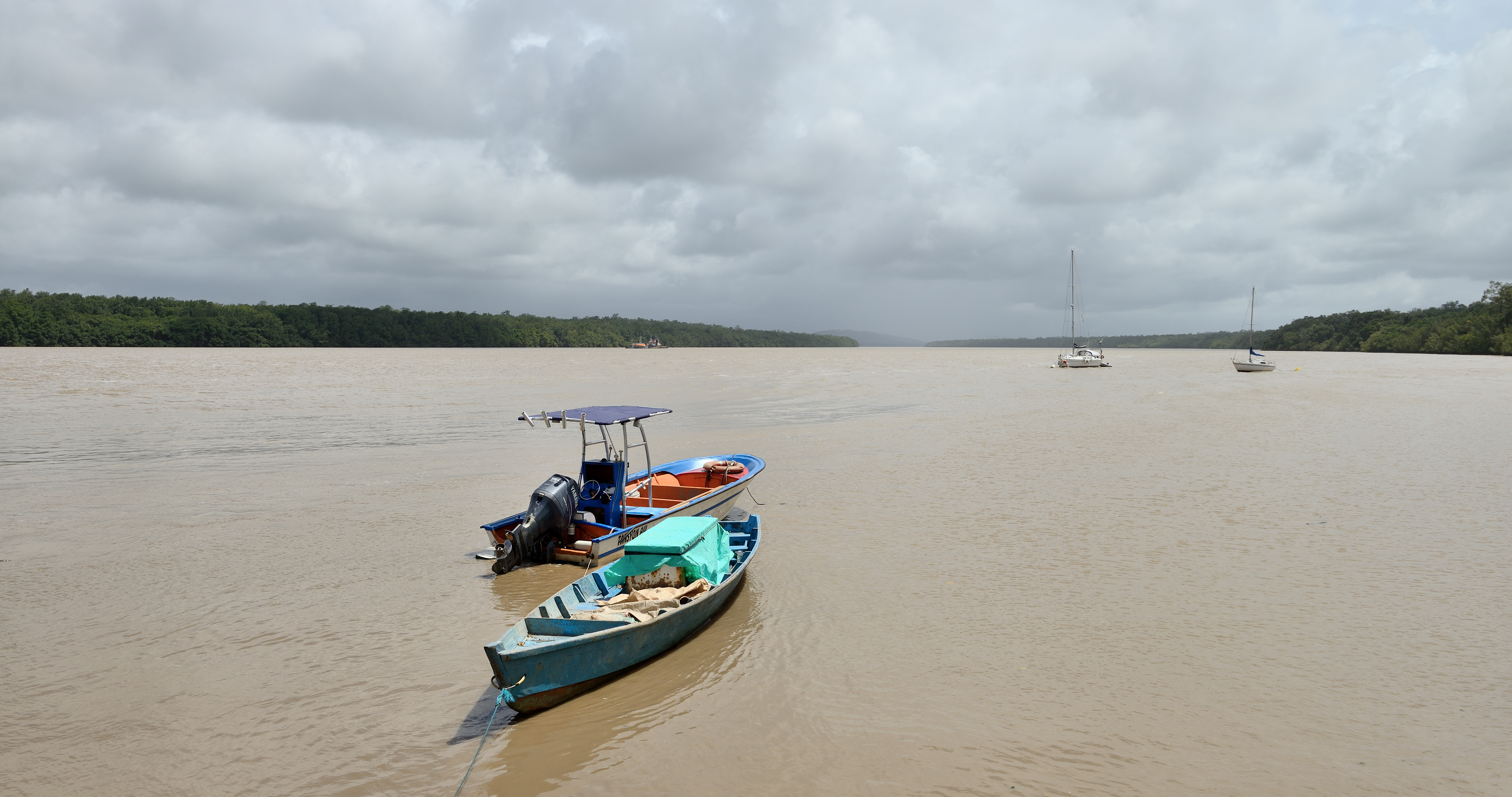
- The Mahury upriver of the port Dégrad des Cannes

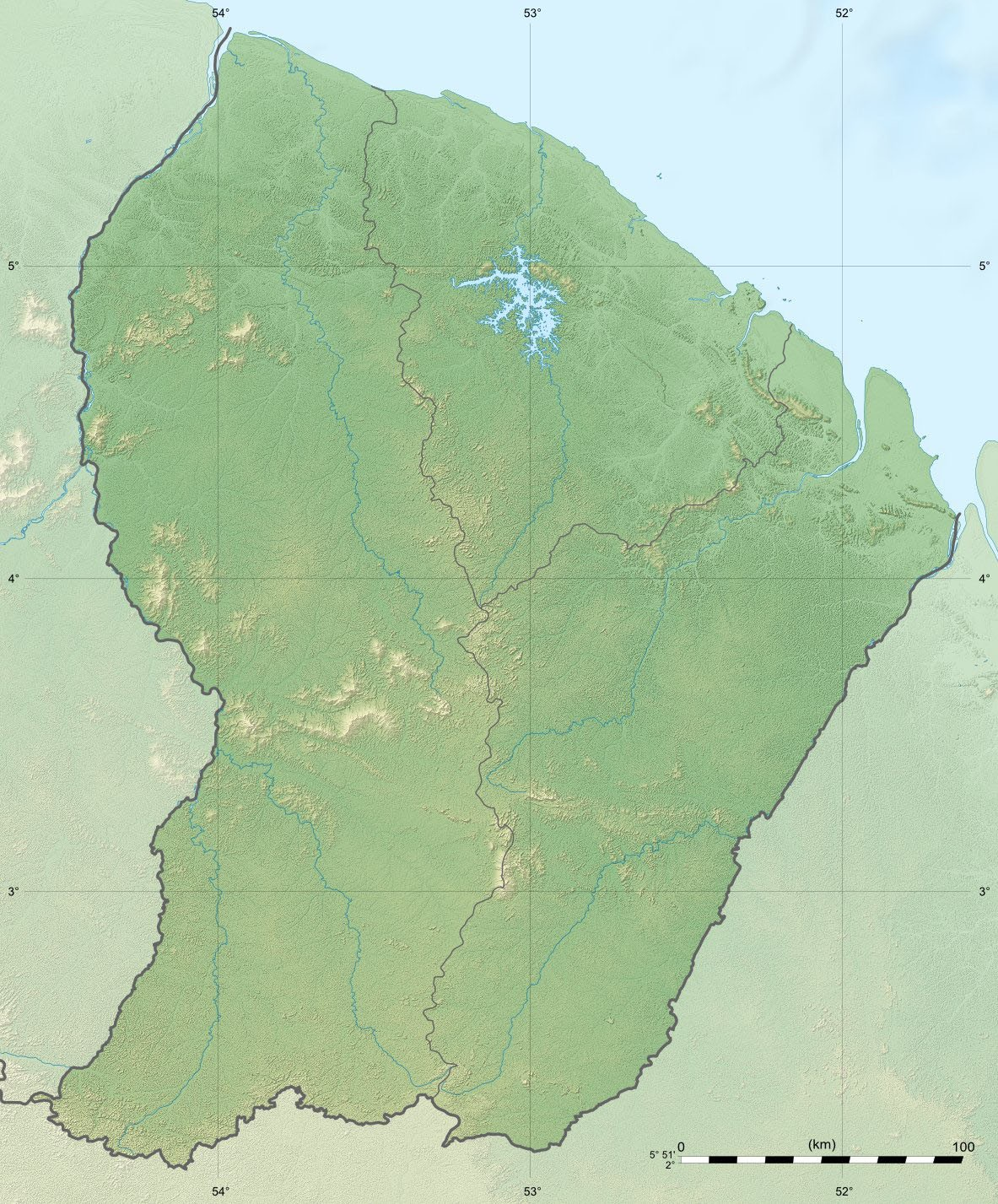
- Location of mouth

Location
- Country: France
- Region: French Guiana

Physical characteristics
- Mouth: Atlantic Ocean
  - coordinates: 4°52′09″N 52°14′08″W
- Length: 169 km (105 mi)

The Mahury is an extended estuary of French Guiana southeast of Cayenne. It reaches 18 kilometres (11 mi) inland from the Atlantic Ocean, where it becomes known as the Oyak. Including its source rivers Comté and Oyak, it is 169 km (105 mi) long.
