= Belgian patrol vessel Castor =

Belgian naval vessel

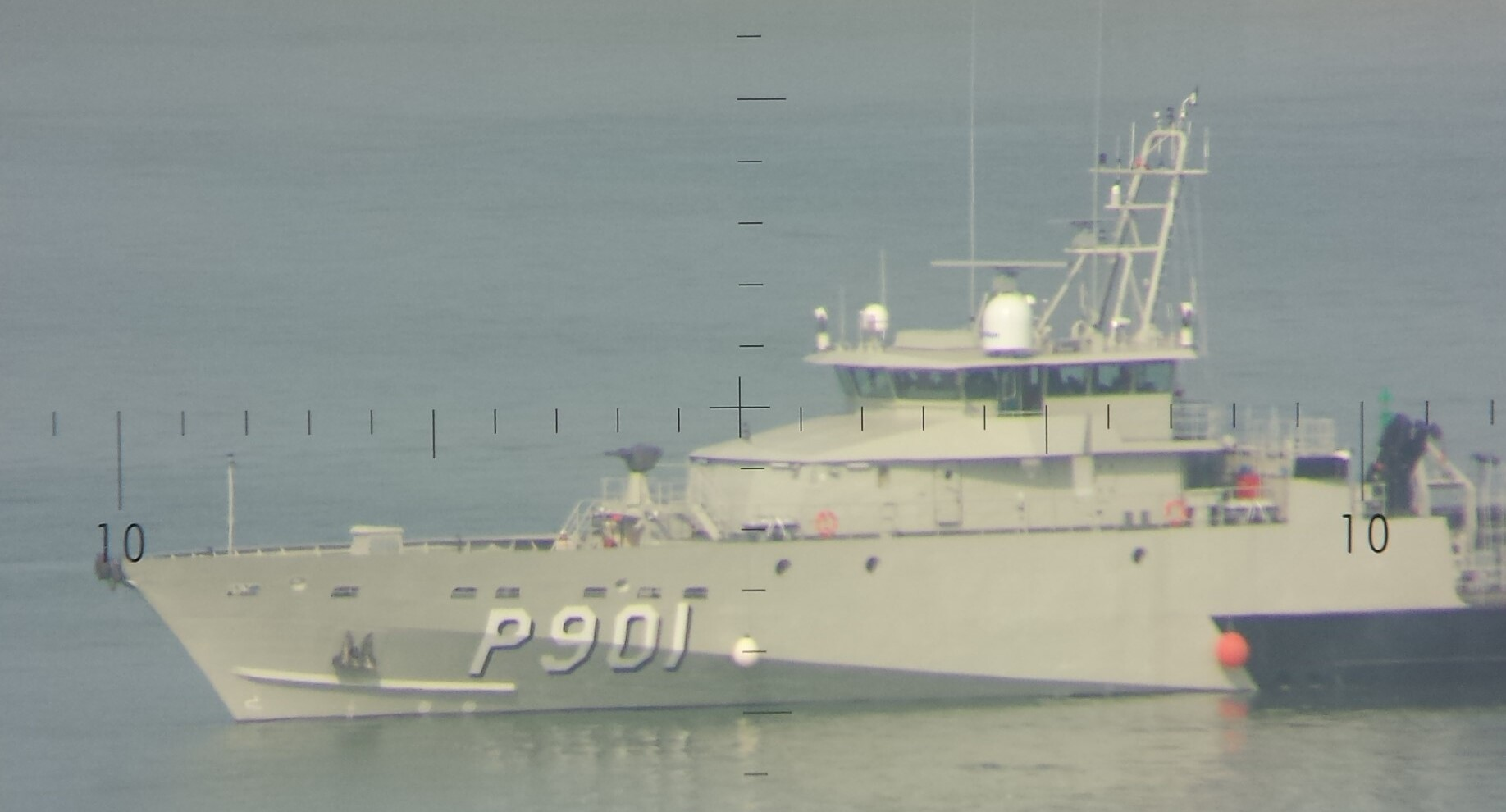

History

Belgium
- Name: Castor
- Namesake: Castor
- Builder: Socarenam yard, Boulogne-sur-Mer, France
- Launched: 14 April 2014
- Commissioned: 10 July 2014
- Identification: MMSI number: 205662000; Pennant number: P901
- Status: Active

General characteristics
- Type: Castor-class patrol vessel
- Displacement: 455 t (448 long tons) full load
- Length: 53.50 m (175 ft 6 in)
- Beam: 9.50 m (31 ft 2 in)
- Draught: 3.19 m (10 ft 6 in)
- Propulsion: 2 × 2,880 kW (3,860 hp) MTU diesel engines
- Speed: 21 knots (39 km/h; 24 mph) (maximum)
- Boats & landing craft carried: 2 × RHIBs
- Crew: 15
- Armament: 12.7 mm FN Herstal Sea deFNder

Castor is a Castor-class patrol vessel of the Belgian Navy. The vessel was constructed in France and entered service in 2014.

== Construction and career ==
Castor was launched on 14 April 2014 at the Socarenam yard in Boulogne-sur-Mer, France. It was commissioned in the Belgian Navy by Queen Mathilde on 10 July 2014. Castor is the lead ship in the Castor class, and has pennant number P901.

Between 24 and 25 November 2014 Castor, together with the Dutch minehunter Makkum, shadowed the Russian landing ship Kaliningrad when it transited the North Sea.
