= Gabonese fast attack craft President El Hadj Omar Bongo =

History

Gabon
- Name: President El Hadj Omar Bongo
- Namesake: Omar Bongo
- Launched: 21 November 1977
- Commissioned: 7 August 1978
- Renamed: General Nazaire Boulingui

General characteristics as built
- Type: Fast attack craft
- Displacement: 150 long tons (150 t) full load
- Length: 138 ft (42.1 m) oa
- Beam: 25 ft 4 in (7.7 m)
- Draught: 6 ft 6 in (2.0 m)
- Propulsion: 3 × MTU 20V 672 TY90 diesel engines; 3 shafts, 9,450 bhp (7,050 kW)
- Speed: 38.5 knots (71.3 km/h; 44.3 mph)
- Range: 1,500 nmi (2,800 km; 1,700 mi) at 15 knots (28 km/h; 17 mph)
- Endurance: 28.4 long tons (28.9 t) diesel oil
- Complement: 20 (3 officers, 17 ratings)
- Armament: 4 × SS12M SSM; 1 × 40 mm (1.6 in) gun; 1 × 20 mm (0.8 in) gun

President El Hadj Omar Bongo was a fast attack craft (FAC) in service with the Gabon Navy. The vessel was constructed in France and entered service in 1978. It was later renamed General Nazaire Boulingui. The FAC was re-engined in 1985.

== Description and design ==
The FAC had a full load displacement of 150 long tons (150 t) and measured 138 feet (42.1 m) long overall with a beam of 25 ft 4 in (7.7 m) and a draught of 6 ft 6 in (2.0 m). President El Hadj Omar Bongo had a triple-skinned mahogany hull. The vessel was powered by three MTU 20V 672 TY90 diesel engines turning three shafts rated at 9,450 brake horsepower (7,050 kW). The FAC had capacity for 28.4 long tons (28.9 t) diesel fuel and had a maximum speed of 38.5 knots (71.3 km/h; 44.3 mph) and a range of 1,500 nautical miles (2,800 km; 1,700 mi) at 15 knots (28 km/h; 17 mph). During sea trials, the vessel reached a maximum speed of 40 knots (74 km/h; 46 mph) at 10,500 brake horsepower (7,800 kW).

President El Hadj Omar Bongo was equipped with Racal Decca RM1226 navigational radar. The FAC mounted two twin-mounted SS12M surface-to-surface missiles and had one 40 mm (1.6 in) gun and one DCN 20 mm (0.8 in) gun for anti-aircraft defence. The vessel had a complement of 20 including 3 officers.

== Construction and career ==
The ship was built by Chantiers Navals de l'Esterel in Cannes, France. The vessel was launched on 21 November 1977, and commissioned into the Gabon Navy on 7 August 1978. The ship was named after the then-ruler of Gabon, Omar Bongo. The vessel's name was later changed to General Nazaire Boulingui. The FAC was re-engined in 1985, receiving three SACM 195 V12 CSHR diesel engines rated at 5,400 hp (4,000 kW). This gave the vessel a maximum speed of 32 knots (59 km/h; 37 mph). In 2000 General Nazaire Boulingui was re-activated.
