= Confiance-class patrol vessel =

French warship class

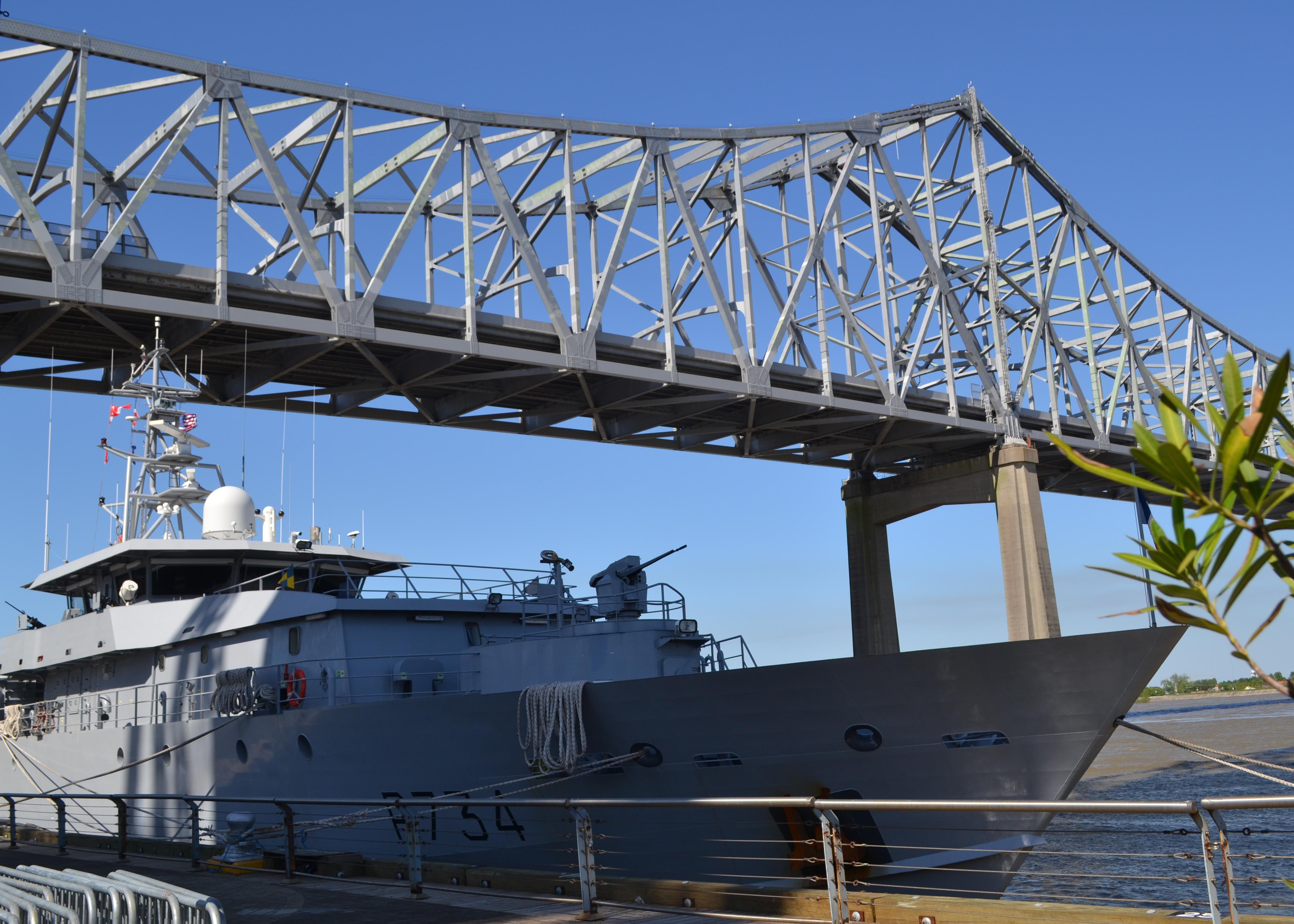
- Résolue moored in New Orleans on 19 April 2018

Class overview
- Name: Patrouilleurs Antilles Guyane
- Builders: Socarenam
- Operators: Marine Nationale
- Preceded by: P400 class
- In commission: 2016–present
- Completed: 3
- Active: 3

General characteristics
- Type: Patrol vessel
- Displacement: 700 tonnes (690 long tons)
- Length: 60.8 m (199 ft 6 in)
- Beam: 9.55 m (31 ft 4 in)
- Draught: 3.2 m (10 ft 6 in)
- Propulsion: 6,000 kW (8,000 hp) engine
- Speed: 21 knots (39 km/h; 24 mph)
- Range: 3,500 nmi (6,500 km; 4,000 mi) at 12 knots (22 km/h; 14 mph)
- Boats & landing craft carried: 2 × 7 m (23 ft) RHIB
- Capacity: 14 passengers
- Complement: 24
- Armament: Nexter Narwhal 20 mm (0.79 in) teleoperated gun; 2 machine guns

The Confiance class or Patrouilleurs Antilles Guyane (PAG), previously called "Patrouilleurs légers guyanais" (PLG, "Light Guyane patrol vessel") until January 2019 is a type of high sea patrol vessel developed and built by Socarenam based upon plans by Mauric. They are in service with the French Navy.

As of 2020, two of the ships, Confiance and Résolue, were based in French Guiana, while the third, Combattante, has her home port at Martinique.

== History ==
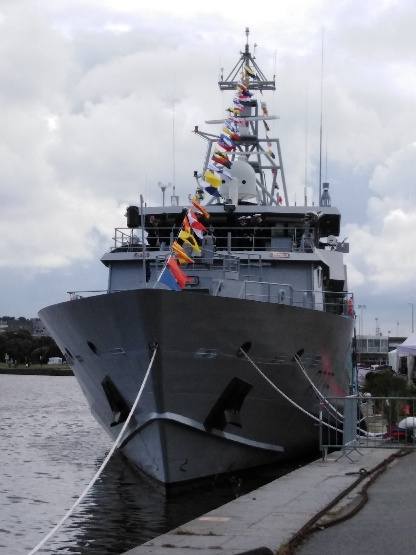
Combattante at Saint-Malo

In 2015, the Direction générale de l'Armement ordered two light patrol ships from Socarenam, as well as six years worth of maintenance for each ship from CNN MCO. The aim was to replace the P400-class patrol vessels Gracieuse and Capricieuse, based at French Guiana. The contract was worth €17 million per ship, and €24 million including development and maintenance. The ships are tasked with policing fishing, as well as patrolling off French Guiana when Ariane rockets are being launched. They are also designed to assist in policing drug trafficking using two rigid-hulled inflatable boats (RHIBs) capable of carrying special forces teams. The RHIBs are made by Zodiac Milpro International. In September 2017, a third ship, which had been pre-ordered as optional in the initial contract, was also ordered for €23 million. Order for the third ship came after Hurricane Irma exposed a weakness in French naval capabilities in the Caribbean Sea.

The ships were based designs by Mauric and constructed at Socarenam shipyards at Saint-Malo. The hulls were then towed to their site at Boulogne-sur-Mer for fitting out, installing navigation equipment and mounting artillery.

In late 2022, La Résolue deployed to Saint Lucia to assist the French Red Cross in the face of floods that affected the north of the island. The ship deployed with 350 tonnes of food, clothing and hygiene kits to support relief efforts.

In early 2025, La Confiance, operating 1,300 km (810 mi) off the coast of Martinique, intercepted a vessel carrying nine tons of cocaine.

== Characteristics ==
The ships have a 24-sailor crew, and can accommodate 14 further passengers. The Confiance-class patrol vessels can stay at sea for up to 12 days. They are equipped with two RHIBs for boarding parties. One of the RHIBs can be launched from a ramp at the aft, and the other from a davit.

Armament constitutes a remote-operated Nexter Narwhal 20 mm (0.79 in) autocannon made by Nexter, as well as mountings for 12.7 mm (0.50 in) and 7.62 mm (0.300 in) machine guns.

== Ships in class ==
As of 2020, the French Navy was operating three Confiance-class vessels.

| Name | Hull number | Construction | Launch | Delivery | Commissioning | Home port |
|---|---|---|---|---|---|---|
| Confiance | P733 | 2015 | 18 December 2015 | 25 October 2016 | 27 April 2017 | Dégrad des Cannes (Guyane) |
| Résolue | P734 | 2016 | | 30 May 2017 | 28 September 2017 | Dégrad des Cannes (Guyane) |
| Combattante | P735 | 2018 | 22 November 2018 | 2 October 2019 | 23 January 2020 | Fort Saint-Louis (Martinique) |

== Gallery ==
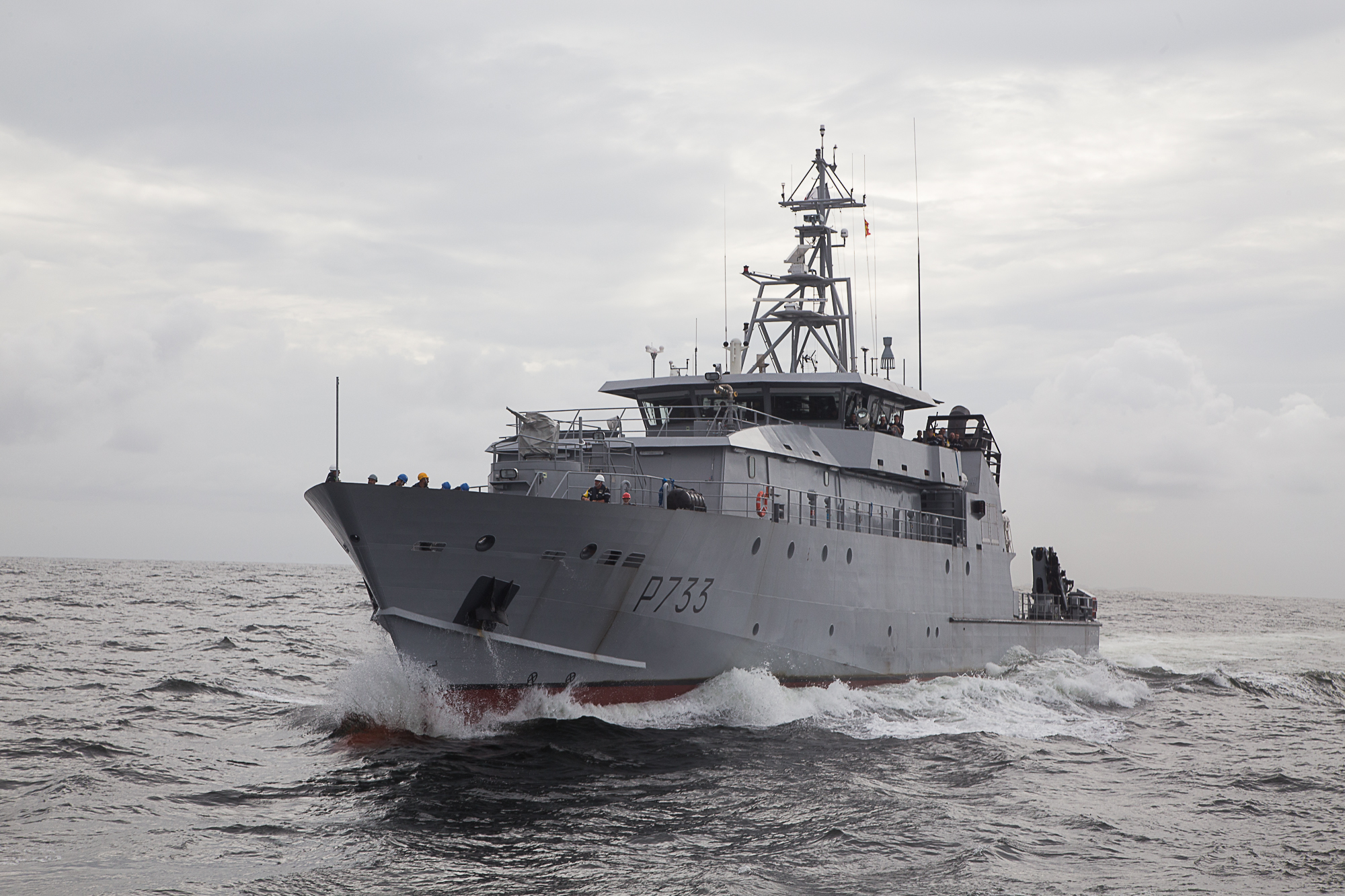
La Confiance

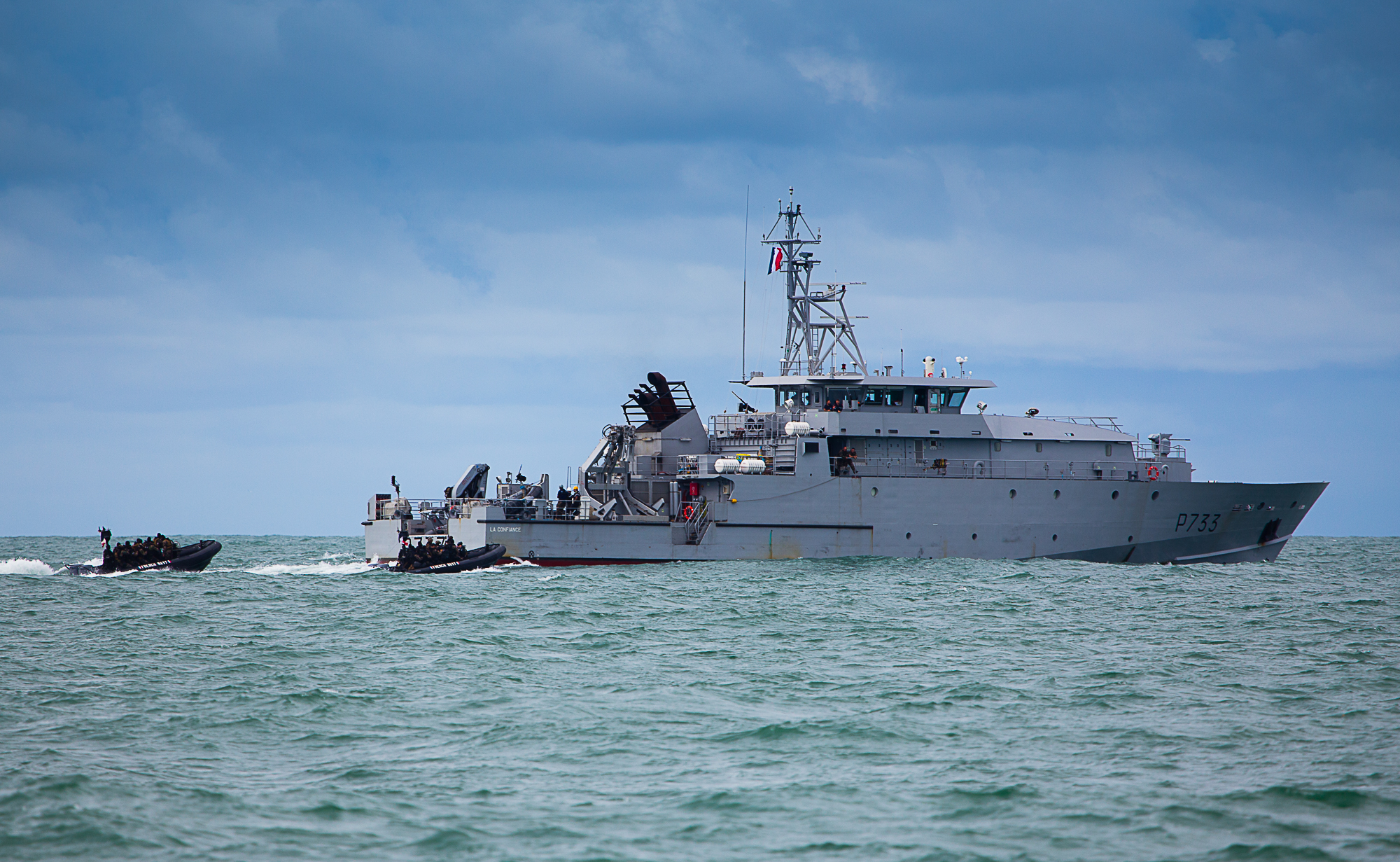
La Confiance with commandos Marine

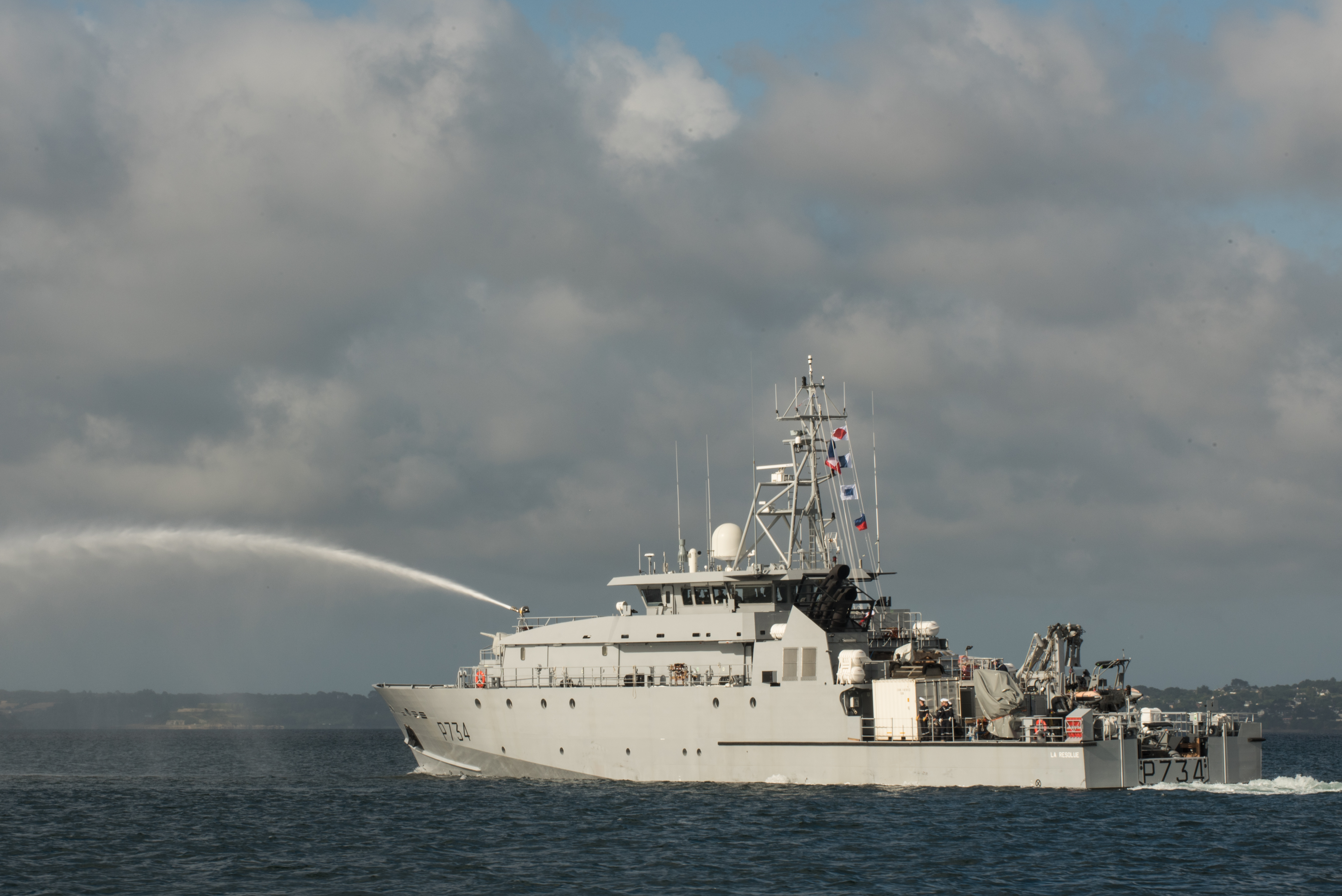
La Résolue

== See also ==
- List of active French Navy ships
