= Dégrad des Cannes =

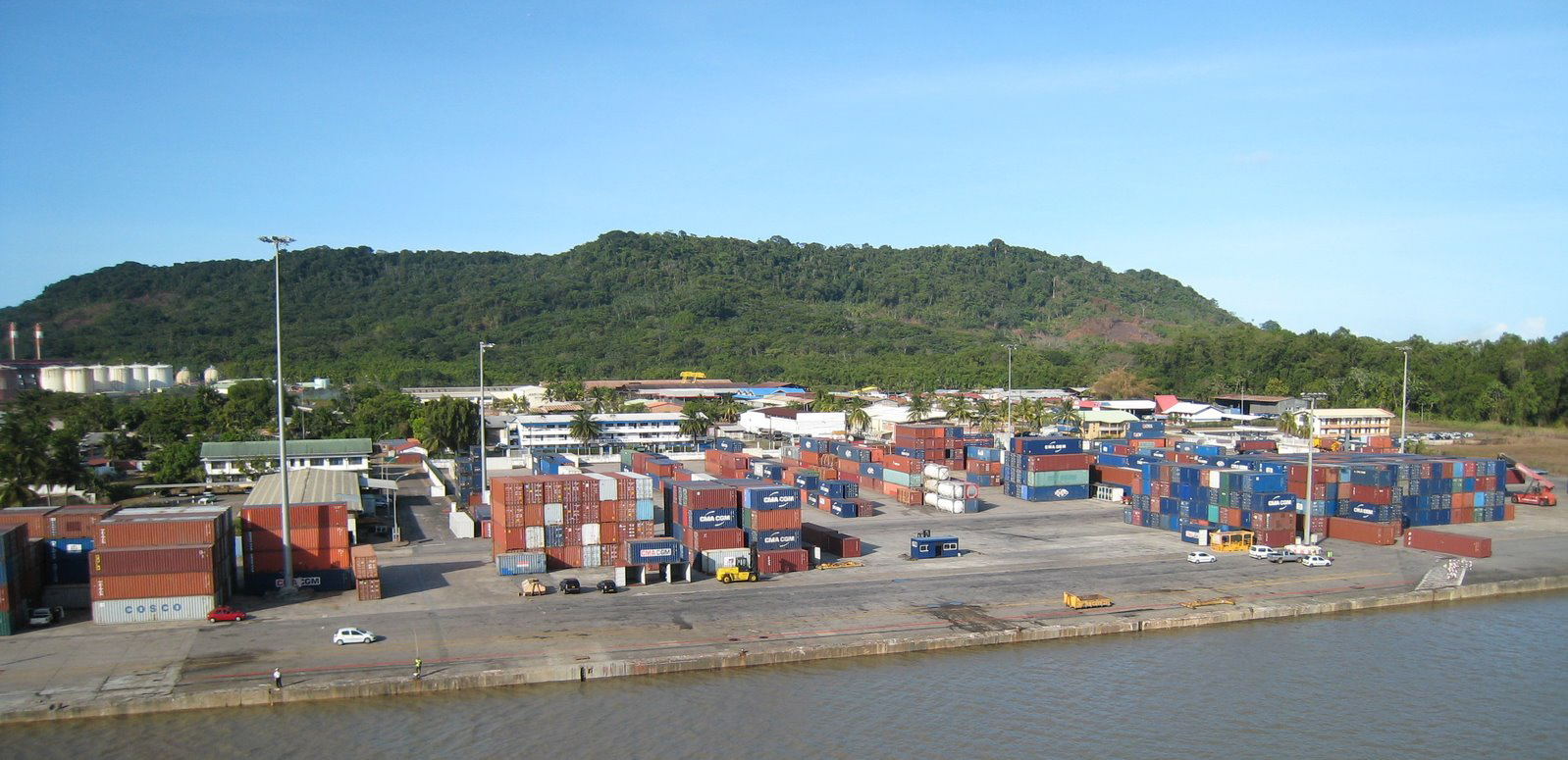

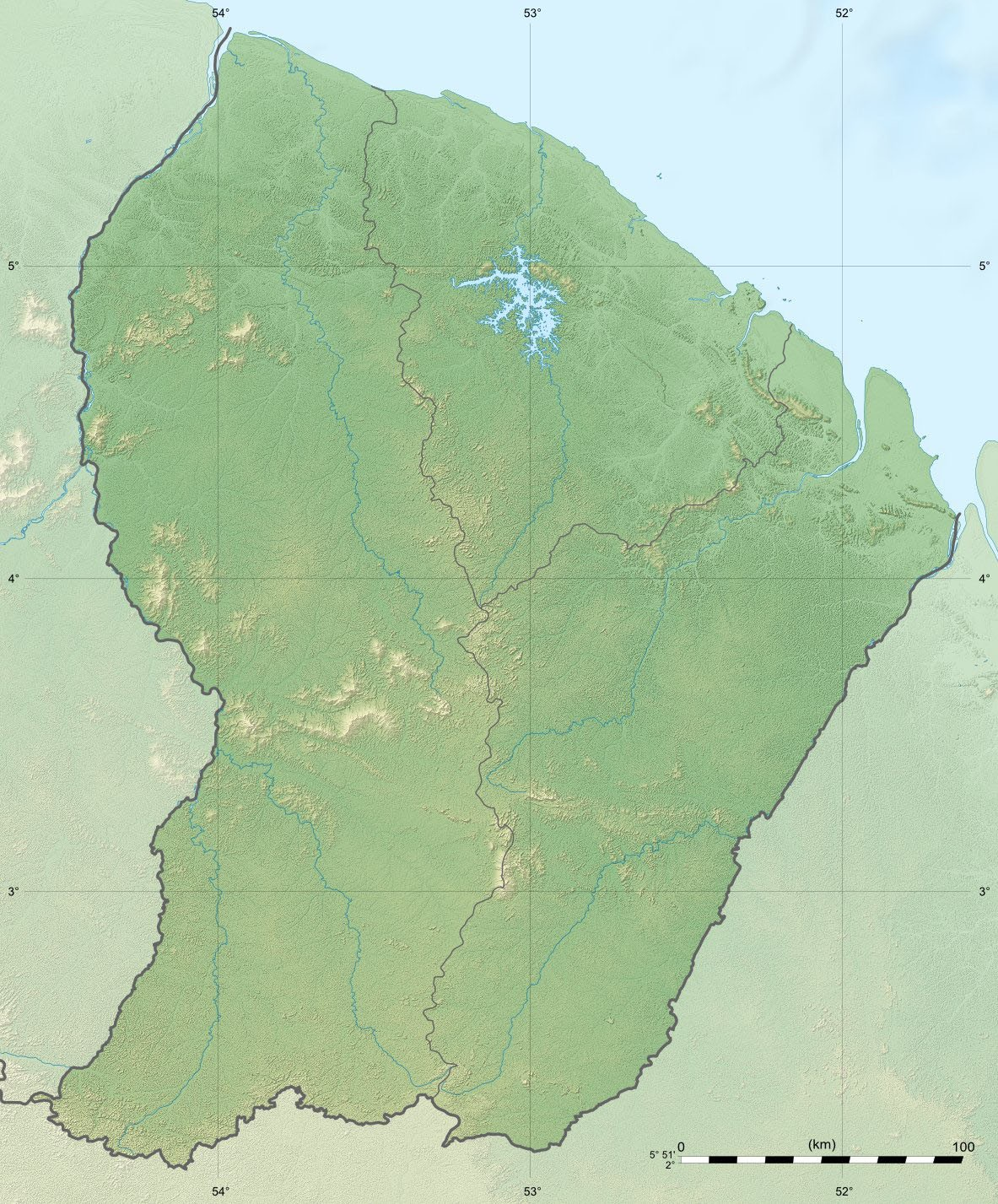
- Location in French Guiana

Location
- Country: French Guiana, France
- Location: Remire-Montjoly, French Guiana
- Coordinates: 4.8546°N 52.2745°W
- UN/LOCODE: GFDDC

Details
- Opened: 1974

Dégrad des Cannes (French pronunciation: [deɡʁa de kan]) is the main seaport for the French Overseas department of French Guiana, situated in the northern edge of South America and opening into the Caribbean. The seaport is located on the estuary of the Mahury River.

Nearly all of French Guiana's imports and exports pass through this port. Built in 1974, it replaced the old harbour of Cayenne which was congested and couldn't cope with modern traffic.

== Naval base ==
It also serves as the main base for the French Navy in the Caribbean Sea and one of five French naval bases not located within Metropolitan France (excluding foreign bases). The naval base is located to the east of the main commercial port along Route des Plages. A small pier for naval vessels to dock connects to the main barracks. The base has a small helipad. The naval base is home to 160 personnel, some from the French Navy and the rest from the Maritime Gendarmerie and headed by a Commandant.

Currently there are two Confiance-class patrol vessels, La Confiance and La Résolue, stationed at the base. Both naval patrol vessels entered service in 2017. The vessels are used mainly for sovereignty patrols, assisting the Maritime Gendarmerie in fisheries patrol vessels and protecting the Guiana Space Centre further west along the coast. The Maritime Gendarmerie operates the patrol boats Charente and Organabo in the territory, Charente having been deployed to the territory in 2022 to replace the previous boat Mahury which was no longer deemed serviceable.

One Engins de Débarquement Amphibie – Standards (EDA-S) landing craft is to be delivered to naval forces based in Guiana by 2025. The landing craft is to better support coastal and riverine operations in the territory.

=== Base Commandant ===
- Alban Mathieu 2014–?
- Serge Permal-Toulcanon ?–2014
