= Business to many =

Business-to-many or B2M is a marketing term for a business that sells their goods or services to other businesses as well as to consumers. Unlike B2B firms that only engage themselves with other businesses or retail firms (B2C) that only contact consumers or the end users of the product, B2M firms do both. It is important to understand that just because an organization does B2M marketing, this does not mean that they target their products and services to everyone. B2M companies, like any other type of company, have a more specific target audience.

The terms B2M, B2B and B2C are usually used when describing methods of e-commerce - the act of selling goods and services online. However, these terms can be used to describe all exchanges and interactions made by an organization, whether it is via e-commerce or not.

== B2B and B2C ==
Business-to-business or B2B marketing is when organizations produce and sell their products and services to other businesses.

Business-to-consumer or B2C marketing is when organizations produce and sell their goods and services directly to consumers or to the end users of the product.

== Benefits ==
With a larger target-audience group, B2M companies have the opportunity of receiving more exposure and funding. These companies receive exposure from word-of-mouth marketing (from consumers) and through various business channels (from other organizations). To add to that, while B2C offers a wider pool of customers, B2B customers are more loyal. This is because customers in B2B commerce most likely have contracts and/or other long-term agreements with the company. The switching costs are also somewhat higher in a B2B relationship, contributing to longer-lasting business-customer relations. What this means is a sustainable source of income to the company. With both B2B and B2C, B2M companies get increased brand awareness through multiple channels, resulting in a company establishing itself more quickly on the market.

== Limitations ==
B2M businesses have a wider target audience and/or a more varied target-audience group. This means their marketing strategies must be more diversified than the usual B2B or B2C businesses in order to appeal to all their customers. Businesses will have more say and tend to have more control over the providing company. They may demand more of the providing company such as more face-to-face meetings, customization of products and services and/or negotiation of prices. This may mean more work from the providing company. On the other hand, consumers are a less reliable source of income who need regular reminders and advertisement schemes to keep their attention. B2M companies will have to work on satisfying both groups, which may result in more workload and higher production and marketing costs.

== Examples ==
An organization that does a combination of B2B and B2C is known as B2M. An example of an industry that does B2M is a book-publishing company. The working relationship between authors and publishers is a B2B relationship as neither are end users of the final product. When a book is published and sold to customers, this is a B2C relationship.

Another example of an industry that does B2M is charity-event organizers. Charity events generally want to attract wealthier individuals as well as businesses and sponsors. They advertise and sell their tickets and send invitations to individuals who wish to attend, as well as inviting large companies to donate and sponsor their cause in order to obtain as much funding and exposure as possible.
