= P400-class patrol vessel =

Small patrol boats of the French Navy

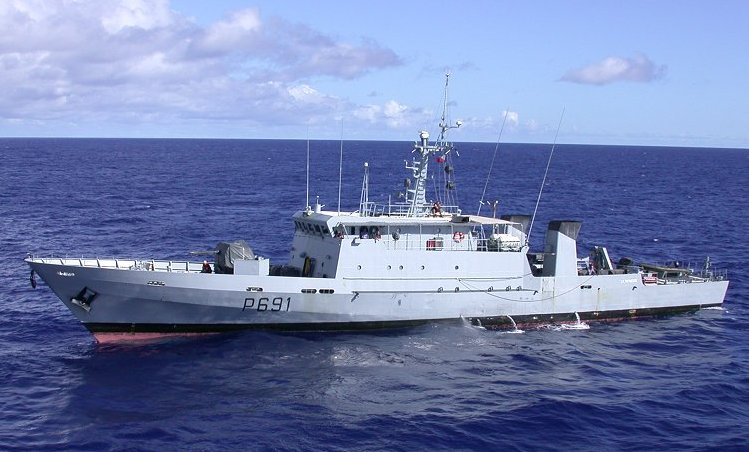
- La Tapageuse

Class overview
- Name: P400
- Builders: Constructions Mécaniques de Normandie
- Operators: Marine Nationale (1986-2023); Gabonese Navy; Kenya Navy; Brazilian Navy
- Succeeded by: Modified D'Estienne d'Orves class; * Confiance-class patrol vessel; Patrouilleur Outre-mer; Patrouilleurs Hauturiers
- Subclasses: Macaé class
- In commission: 18 September 1986
- Active: 2 former French Navy vessels transferred to Gabon and Kenya, plus 2 built for Gabon
- Retired: 8

General characteristics
- Type: Patrol ship
- Displacement: 373 tonnes (367 long tons)
- Length: 54.8 m (179 ft 9 in)
- Beam: 8 m (26 ft 3 in)
- Draught: 2.54 m (8 ft 4 in)
- Installed power: Electrical plant: 3 GE Poyaud Jeumond (120 kW (160 hp) each)
- Propulsion: Engines : 2 diesel SEMT Pielstick 200PAVGDS 3,700 hp (2,800 kW) each; 7,400 hp (5,500 kW), 2 inversor-reductors, 2 fixed-blade propellers
- Speed: 24 knots (44 km/h; 28 mph)
- Boats & landing craft carried: 1 × EFRC 10 seats; 1 × EFR 10 seats
- Complement: 29
- Sensors & processing systems: UHF, VHF, HF, 1 DECCA 1226, 1 OMEGA M6, MF CRM 4215 radiogoniometer, shallow water tester, Ben LMN3 loch, CGM4 gyroscopic compass
- Armament: Bofors 40 mm gun; 20 mm modèle F2 gun; 2 × AA-52 machine guns

The P400-class patrol vessels were small patrol boats of the French Navy. They were designed to accomplish police operations in the French exclusive economic zone (EEZ). They were built by the Constructions Mécaniques de Normandie, which specialise in small military craft. Two similar ships are in service in Gabon, the similar Macaé-class operates with the Brazilian Navy, and two ships were transferred from the French Navy to Kenyan and Gabon navies. The P400 class were originally designed in two versions: one armed with Exocet MM38 missiles, and another public service version with a smaller 16-man complement; eventually neither of these versions were commissioned as the French Navy chose an intermediate version.

All of these craft were based in overseas territories (DOM/TOM) where they conducted sea monitoring missions and secured the EEZ. They also executed missions in the context of French agreements with other nations, typically supporting foreign armies or carrying out humanitarian missions. Since late 2008, ships of the D'Estienne d'Orves class, with their heavy armament removed, were planned to replace the P400 in the high sea patrol role, a task for which the P400 class have proved to be underweight.

== Design ==
The P400 class are fitted with a hydraulic crane capable of lifting 2.5 t (2.5 long tons; 2.8 short tons). This allows to use them for anti-pollution operations, by embarking and debarking equipment and anti-pollution chemicals, and to lift out small craft whilst at sea. An unusual feature for ships of this size, the Operational Centre allows a complete monitoring of close surface situations, using radar indicators and tracking tables. The engine can now be monitored remotely, which allows for a smaller crew. The maintenance of the ship was simplified notably by choosing those solutions which allow to clean the ship whilst in populated areas. The P400 class can stay 15 days at sea, and have 20 days of food supplies for 28 adults.

The engines of the P400 have been a constant source of technical problems since the maiden voyage of the lead ship L'Audacieuse to Dakar.

The first problem that occurred related to the carter reductor, then with the transmission, and eventually with a piston - this last item being the most worrying, since it was probably a symptom of a conception problem. This shed a bad light on Alstom who were trying to compete against German motors by MTU. French humourist Coluche came up with the witty remark Après l'Audacieuse, la Boudeuse, la Capricieuse,… voici venu le temps de la Dépanneuse ! (After the Audacieuse, the Boudeuse, the Capricieuse, time has come for the Tow-Truck!). After these problems were solved, larger exhaust pipes had to be fixed (originally, exhaust was vented underwater to minimise infra-red signature, but it turned out that the ship was taking water from these openings).

After further studies, it became possible to gain the space of one propulsion compartment, which is now used for cargo and personnel. The ships can ferry 20 people, and up to 60 for short travel with a calm sea.

== Service history ==
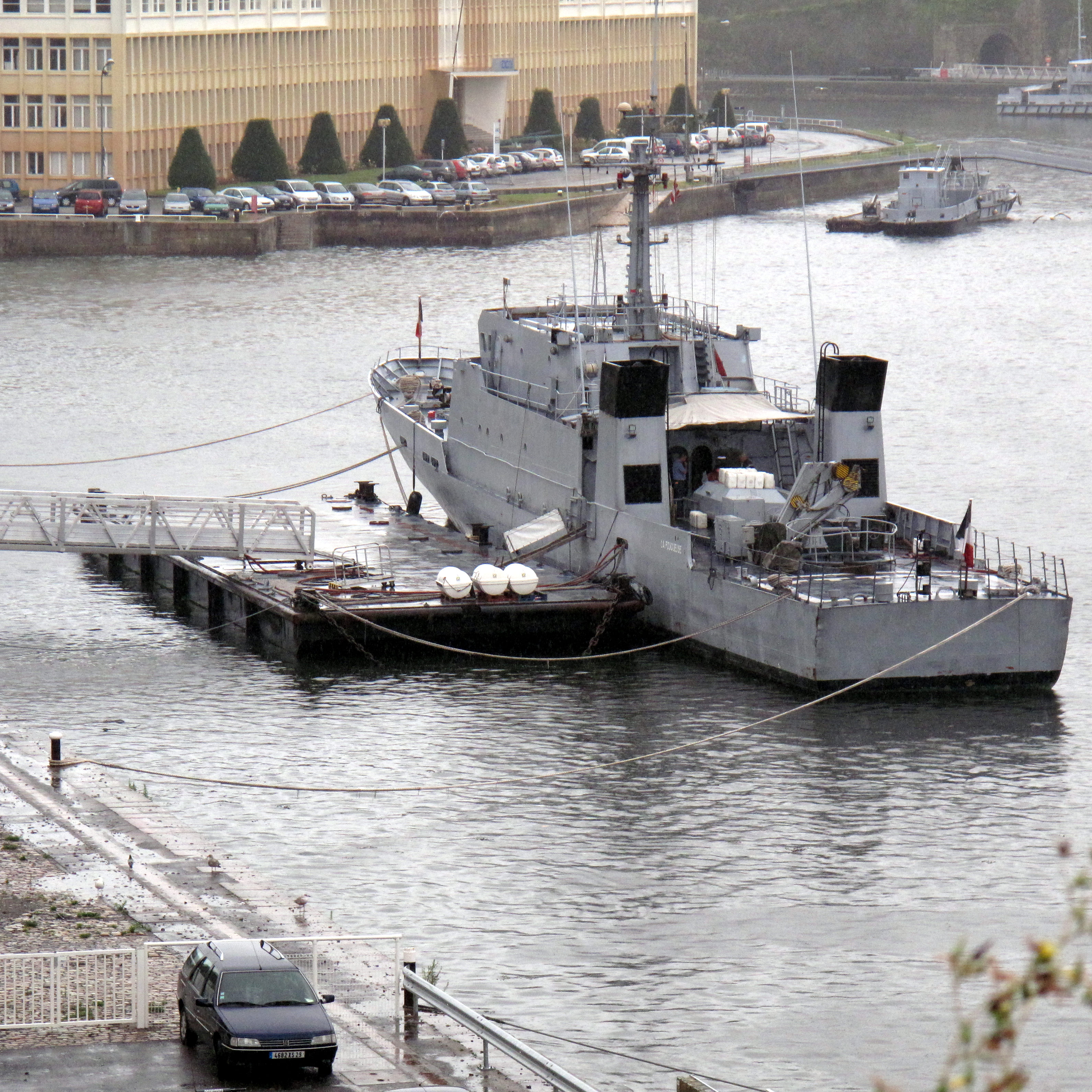
La Fougueuse awaiting decommissioning near Recouvrance Bridge in summer 2009

In May 2009, La Fougueuse arrived in Brest to be decommissioned, the first of the P400 class to be taken out of service.

The ships were initially equipped with two Wartsila SACM UD30 V16 M3 diesel engines. New engines were delivered to France's Mother Boda and installed by Piriou Naval Services in a 10-year contract worth €30 million (US$39 million). The first of the modernised ships were to be returned to the French Navy by March 2011. PNS also undertakes restoration of these ships.

By 2020, all vessels in French service, except La Glorieuse, had been retired from French service. La Glorieuse remained in service in New Caledonia until May 2023.

One of the decommissioned vessels, La Tapageuse, was offered to the Philippine Coast Guard, and was estimated to cost about €6 million including the refurbishing works. The deal did not push through, and French shipbuilder Piriou took control of the ship, which was later sold to Gabon as part of a larger deal.

== Replacements ==
In December 2019 six 80-metre (260 ft) Patrouilleur Outre-mer (POM-type) patrol vessels were ordered as replacements for the P400s as well as for other French coast guard vessels. These were to be delivered between 2022 and 2025 to protect the exclusive economic zone of French overseas territories in the Indian Ocean and the Pacific. In May 2021, it was reported that the delivery of the first of these vessels would be delayed, from an originally planned in-service date of 2022, until 2023.

== Ships ==
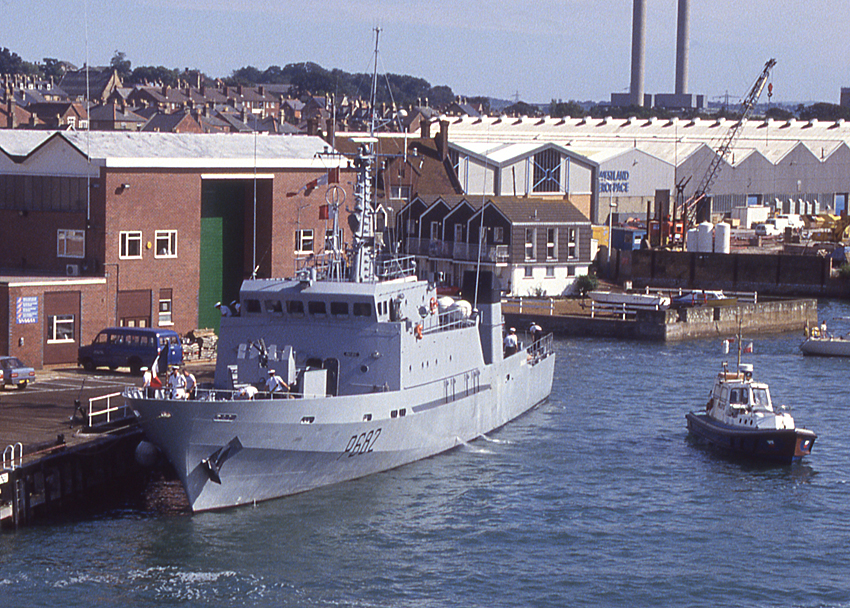
P682 L'Audacieuse at Cowes, 1991

- P682 L'Audacieuse (Degrad des Cannes), decommissioned in 2011.
- P683 La Boudeuse (La Réunion), decommissioned in 2011.
- P684 La Capricieuse (Degrad des Cannes), decommissioned in 2017.
- P685 La Fougueuse (Fort-de-France), decommissioned in 2009.
- P686 La Glorieuse (Nouméa), decommissioned in 2023
- P687 La Gracieuse (Fort-de-France), decommissioned in 2017.
- P688 La Moqueuse (Nouméa) decommissioned in 2020.
- P689 La Railleuse (Papeete), decommissioned in 2011.
- P690 La Rieuse (La Réunion), donated to the Kenya Navy in 2011, renamed KNS Harambee II.
- P691 La Tapageuse (Papeete), decommissioned in 2012, sold to Ivory Coast Navy in 2023, renamed Contre amiral Fadika
