= French patrol vessel La Glorieuse =

La Glorieuse
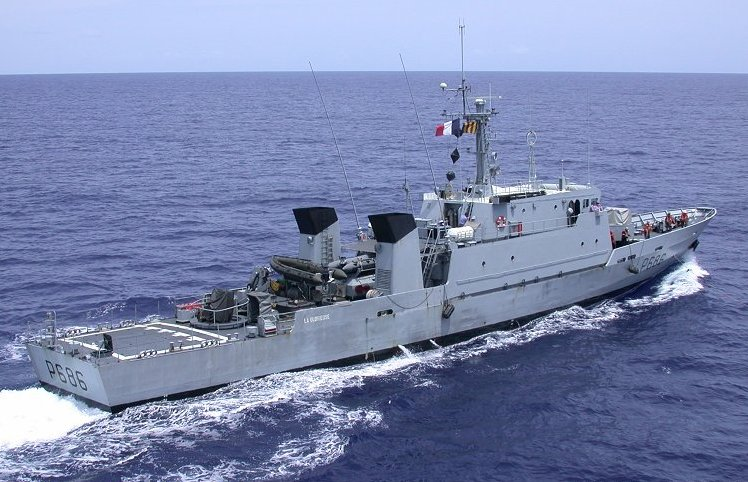
- La Glorieuse at sea off Nouméa (16 November 2002)

History

France
- Name: La Glorieuse
- Laid down: January 1984
- Launched: 25 January 1985
- Commissioned: 18 April 1987
- Decommissioned: 24 July 2023
- Out of service: 11 May 2023
- Status: Decommissioned

General characteristics
- Class & type: P400-class patrol vessel
- Displacement: 373 tonnes (367 long tons)
- Length: 54.8 m (179 ft 9 in)
- Beam: 8 m (26 ft 3 in)
- Draught: 2.54 m (8 ft 4 in)
- Installed power: Electrical plant: 3 GE Poyaud Jeumond (120 kW or 160 hp each)
- Propulsion: Engines : 2 diesel SEMT Pielstick 200PAVGDS 3,700 hp (2,800 kW) each; 7,400 hp (5,500 kW), 2 inversor-reductors, 2 fixed-blade propellers
- Speed: 24 knots (44 km/h; 28 mph)
- Boats & landing craft carried: 1 × EFRC 10 seats; 1 × EFR 10 seats
- Complement: 29
- Sensors & processing systems: UHF, VHF, HF, 1 DECCA 1226, 1 OMEGA M6, MF CRM 4215 radiogoniometer, shallow water tester, Ben LMN3 loch, CGM4 gyroscopic compass
- Armament: Bofors 40 mm gun; 20 mm modèle F2 gun; 2 × AA-52 machine guns

La Glorieuse was the fifth ship in the P400 class of patrol vessels within the French Navy. She was the last vessel of her class still in service with the French Navy but was removed from active service in May 2023 and decommissioned in July.

== Service history ==
La Glorieuse was launched on 25 January 1985, commissioned in 1987 and assigned to patrol the offshore zone around New Caledonia.

On 31 October 2013, thanks to detection by a Falcon 200 Gardian surveillance aircraft, La Glorieuse intercepted an armed Chinese fishing boat operating illegally in the New Caledonia exclusive economic zone (EEZ).
On 13 November the same year she took part in a maritime surveillance operation in the Pacific Ocean in support of the frigate Prairial, then in preparation for surveillance operations in the same zone. In March 2015 she set out to assist the inhabitants of Vanuatu affected by cyclone Pam. In early 2022, La Glorieuse deployed to Tonga with 10 tonnes (9.8 long tons; 11 short tons) of supplies to assist the island in the aftermath of a volcanic eruption.
