= French ship Jacques Cartier =

French Navy BATRAL vessel

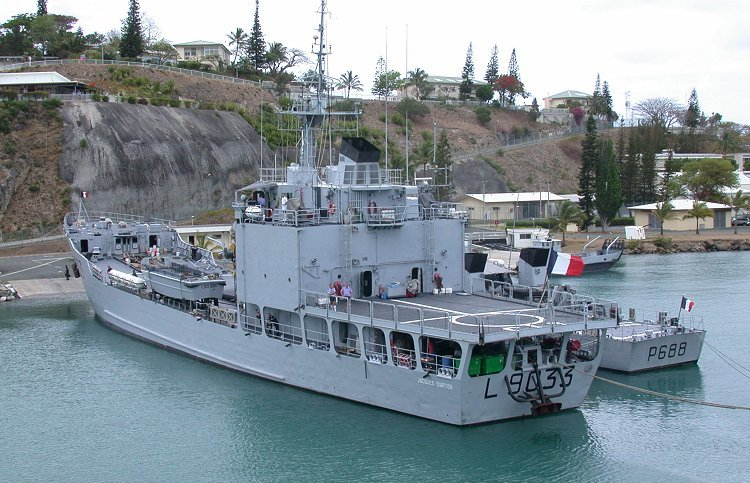
- Jacques Cartier alongside at Noumea in November 2002

History

France
- Name: Jacques Cartier
- Namesake: Jacques Cartier
- Launched: 28 April 1982
- Decommissioned: July 2013
- Fate: Scrapped October 2016

General characteristics
- Class & type: BATRAL
- Displacement: 770 tons, 1,330 tons fully loaded
- Length: 80 m (260 ft)
- Beam: 13 m (43 ft)
- Draught: 3 m (9.8 ft)
- Propulsion: 2 diesel SACM Wärtsilä UD 33 V12 M4, 3600 hp (2650 kW), 2 4-bladed propellers
- Speed: 16 knots (30 km/h; 18 mph)
- Range: 4,500 nautical miles (8,300 km; 5,200 mi) at 13 knots (24 km/h; 15 mph)
- Endurance: 15 days without passengers; 10 days with passengers
- Boats & landing craft carried: 2 LCVP; 2 whaleboats; one 10-seat and one 6-seat Zodiac
- Capacity: 2 × 138-man rooms; 12 vehicles
- Complement: 3 officers; 15 petty officers; 26 quarter-masters
- Sensors & processing systems: 1 DECCA 1226 navigation radar; Inmarsat system
- Armament: 2 × 40 mm anti-air guns; 2 × 12.7 mm machine guns; 2 × 81mm mortars
- Aviation facilities: landing point for a 6-tonne helicopter

Jacques Cartier (L9033) is one of five BATRAL ("Light ferry ship") vessels operated by the French Navy.

The BATRAL vessels are able to ferry over 400 tons of matériel, in the hangar and on the deck. Loading and unloading can be done from a harbour or from a beach. Two flat-bottom vessels allow unloading 50 men and light vehicles each. The accommodations are designed for a Guépard-type intervention unit (5 officers, 15 petty officers and 118 men), or for typical company-sized armoured units. A helicopter landing deck allows landing for light helicopters, and transfer from and to heavy helicopters.

Jacques Cartier was deployed to East Timor as part of the Australian-led INTERFET peacekeeping taskforce from 28 November 1999 to 12 January 2000.

She was decommissioned in July 2013 after returning from her final deployment overseas.
