= Socarenam =

French shipbuilding company

- Type: Employee stock ownership
- Industry: Shipbuilding, defence
- Founded: 1961; 65 years ago
- Headquarters: Boulogne-sur-Mer, Pas-de-Calais, Hauts-de-France, France
- Area served: Worldwide
- Products: Patrol boats, merchant vessels, fishing vessels, tugboats, platform supply vessels, diving support vessels
- Number of employees: >250
- Website: socarenam.com

Socarenam (French: SOCARENAM, acronym: Société Calaisienne de Réparation Navale et Mécanique) is a French employee-owned shipbuilding company that operates shipyards in multiple ports in northern and western of the country.

== History ==
Socarenam was founded in Calais in 1961 by Société Navale Caeannaise for repair and maintenance of its commercial fleet.

In 1969, the company established a new shipyard on the former site of Les chantiers BAHEUX in Boulogne-sur-Mer, a famous riveted steel fishing vessels shipbuilder that was created at the end of 19th century and had previously moved its headquarters to Boulogne. Socarenam opened its third workshop in Dunkirk in 1973 because of the company's tremendous workload.

In 1989, the parent company decided to spin off some subsidiaries, including Socarenam. At this point, the shipyard employees decided to take over a 100% stake in Socarenam, which finally meant that the employees managed to acquire their shipyard.

On February 24, 2020, the French Defense Procurement Agency (DGA) awarded Socarenam a contract worth approximately €20 million for three coastal surveillance boats (VCSM). These 22-meter vessels can accommodate eight crew members and operate for up to five days. They will be equipped with a stabilized optronic system, two 12.7 mm machine guns, and a light boat capable of reaching 35 knots. Assigned to the maritime gendarmerie, they will be used for coastal surveillance and fisheries enforcement.

The company has been contracted by the Direction générale de l'Armement to build the Confiance class and the Patrouilleur Outre-mer ships.

In May 2020, the Polish Coast Guard acquired an offshore patrol vessel from Socarenam for €22 million. The company also built the Belgian patrol boats P901 Castor and P902 Pollux, delivered in 2014 and 2015. In November 2024, Belgium ordered a third vessel of this type.
