= BATRAL-class landing ship =

French Navy landing vessel

BATRAL class
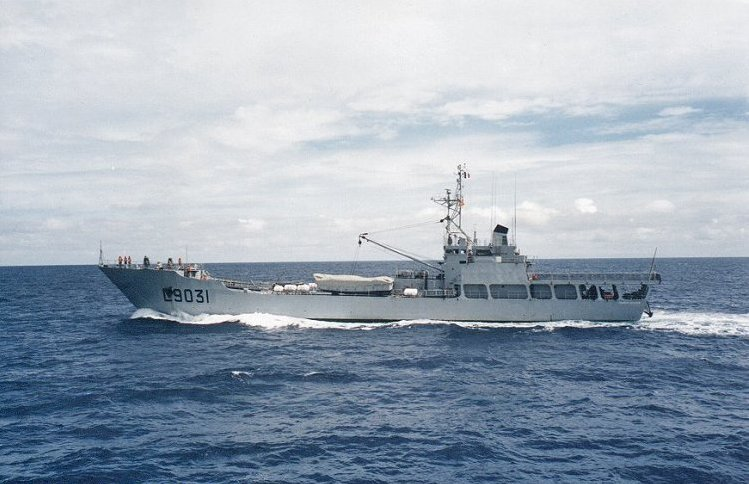
- BATRAL Francis Garnier

Class overview
- Builders: DCN, Brest; ASMAR, Talcahuano
- Succeeded by: Bâtiment Multimission (B2M)

General characteristics
- Type: Landing ship tank
- Displacement: 770 t, 1,330 t fully loaded
- Length: 80 m (262 ft 6 in)
- Beam: 13 m (42 ft 8 in)
- Draught: 3 m (9 ft 10 in)
- Installed power: 2 × diesel SACM Wärtsilä UD 33 V12 M4; 3,600 hp (2,700 kW); Electric power: 2 × DA 180 kW
- Propulsion: 2 × 4-bladed propellers
- Speed: 16 knots (30 km/h; 18 mph)
- Range: 4,500 nmi (8,300 km; 5,200 mi) at 13 knots (24 km/h; 15 mph)
- Complement: 3 officers; 15 petty officers; 26 quarter-masters
- Sensors & processing systems: 1 × Decca 1226 navigation radar; Inmarsat system
- Armament: 2 × 40 mm anti-air guns; 2 × 12.7 mm machine guns
- Aviation facilities: Helicopter landing deck

The Bâtiment de Transport Léger (abbreviated BATRAL; "Light ferry ship") are small landing ships of the French Navy. Also known as Champlain class by the lead ship, they have been used for regional transport and patrol needs in French Overseas Departments and Territories since the 1970s. On 9 January 2014 it was announced that the two remaining Batrals in French service would be replaced in 2015/16 by three (subsequently four) 1500-tonne Bâtiments Multimission (B2M) at a cost of ~€100m (US$136m).

== Design ==
The BATRALs can ferry over 400 tons of matériel, in the hangar and on the deck. Loading and unloading can be done from a harbour or on a beach. Two flat-bottom vessels allow unloading fifty men and light vehicles each. The accommodations are designed for a Guépard-type intervention unit (five officers, fifteen petty officers and 118 men), or for typical company-sized armoured units. A helicopter landing deck allows landing for light helicopters, and transfer to and from heavy helicopters.

== History ==
The Chilean Navy purchased the plans and built three ships in the ASMAR shipyards in the early 1980s.

== Ships ==
French Navy

- Champlain decommissioned
- Francis Garnier decommissioned
- Dumont D'Urville decommissioned in July 2017
- Jacques Cartier decommissioned
- La Grandière decommissioned in 2016

Chilean Navy

- Maipo (LST-91) 1982–1998
- Rancagua (LST-92) 1983–present
- Chacabuco (LST-95) 1986–present

Côte d'Ivoire Navy

- L'Elephant

Gabon Navy

- President el Hadj Omar Bongo (L05)

Royal Moroccan Navy

- Daoud Ben Aicha (402)
- Ahmed Es Skali (403)
- Abou Abdallah El Ayachi (404)
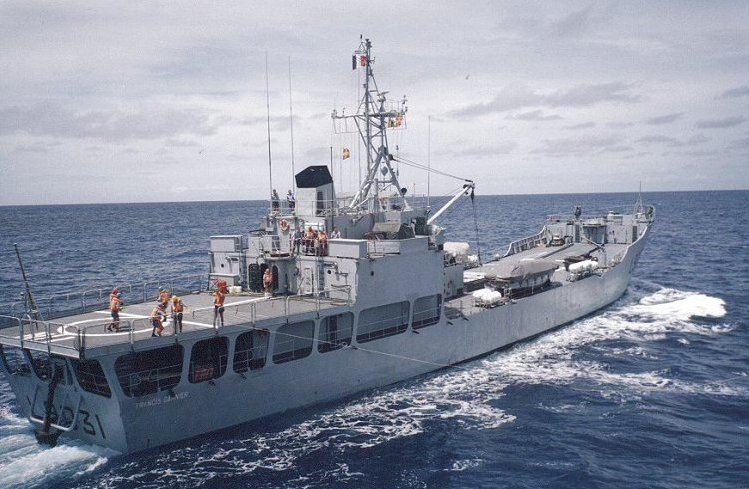
Francis Garnier at sea

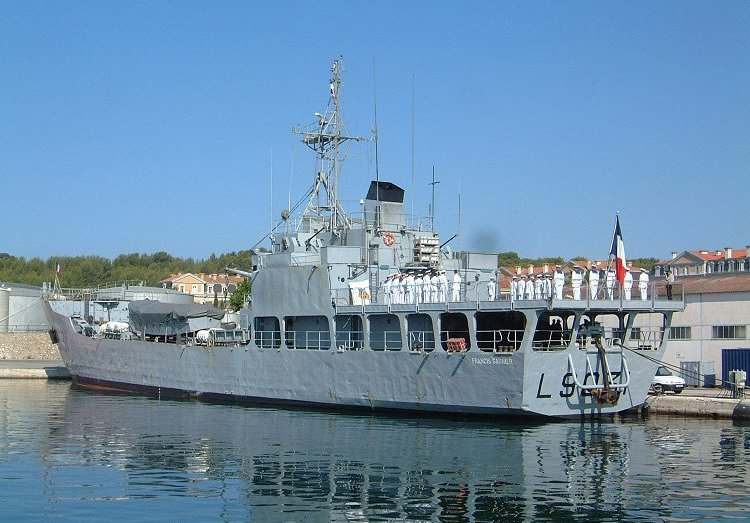
Francis Garnier in port

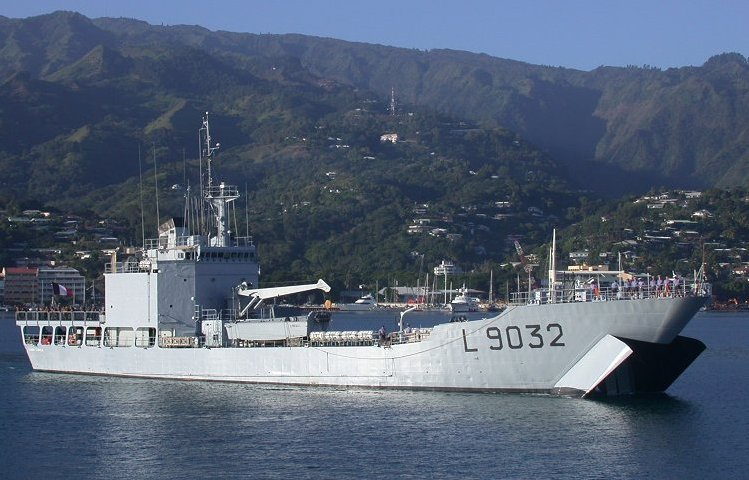
Dumont D'Urville with her landing bow opened

== See also ==
Equivalent landing ships of the same era

- Polnocny class
- Type 079
- Kumbhir class
