= French Navy =

Maritime arm of the French Armed Forces

- Marine nationale
- Logo of the French Navy
- Founded: 1626; 400 years ago
- Country: France
- Type: Navy
- Role: Naval warfare
- Size: 40,000+ personnel (2025) and 7,000 civilians (2021)
- Part of: French Armed Forces
- Garrison/HQ: Main: Brest, Île Longue, Toulon; Secondary: Cherbourg-en-Cotentin, Lorient
- Nickname: La Royale
- Mottos: Honneur, patrie, valeur, discipline ("Honour, homeland, valour, discipline")
- Colours: Blue, white, red
- Ships: Current fleet
- Engagements: See list: Anglo-French War (1627–1629); Franco-Spanish War (1635–59); Second Anglo-Dutch War; Franco-Dutch War; Nine Years' War; War of the Spanish Succession; War of the Austrian Succession; Seven Years' War; American Revolutionary War; Anglo-French War (1778–1783); French Revolutionary Wars; Napoleonic Wars; French conquest of Algeria; Battle of the Tagus (1831); Pastry War; Crimean War; Second French intervention in Mexico; Sino-French War; French conquest of Morocco; World War I; World War II; Indochina War; Korean War; Algerian War; Operation Musketeer; Bizerte crisis; Lebanese Civil War; Gulf War; Yugoslav Wars; Kosovo War; 1999 East Timorese crisis; War on terror; War in Afghanistan; Opération Harmattan; Red Sea crisis; Operation Aspides
- Website: defense.gouv.fr/marine

Commanders
- Chief of the Armed Forces: President Emmanuel Macron
- Chef d'État-Major de la Marine: Amiral Nicolas Vaujour
- Major Général de la Marine: Vice-amiral d'escadre Stanislas Gourlez de la Motte
- Notable commanders: See list: Louis Victor de Rochechouart, Duke of Vivonne; Anne Hilarion de Tourville; Jean Bart; Claude de Forbin; François Joseph Paul de Grasse; Pierre André de Suffren; Charles-Alexandre Léon Durand Linois; Guy-Victor Duperré; Henri de Rigny; Amédée Courbet

Insignia
- Insignia: Ranks in the French Navy
- Naval ensign

Aircraft flown
- Attack: Rafale M
- Electronic warfare: E-2 Hawkeye
- Fighter: Rafale M
- Helicopter: NH90, Eurocopter Lynx, Panther, Dauphin
- Attack helicopter: NH90, Panther
- Patrol: Bréguet 1150 Atlantic, Dassault Falcon 20, Dassault Falcon 50, Dassault Falcon 2000
- Trainer: Mudry CAP 10, MS-88 Rallye, Dassault Falcon 10, Embraer EMB 121 Xingu
- Transport: Dassault Falcon 10, Embraer EMB 121 Xingu

The French Navy (Note: French: Marine nationale, pronounced [maʁin nɑsjɔnal], lit. 'National Navy', informally La Royale (French pronunciation: [la ʁwajal], lit. 'The Royal [One]') is the maritime arm of the French Armed Forces and one of the four military service branches of France. It is among the largest and most powerful naval forces in the world recognised as being a blue-water navy. The French Navy is capable of operating globally and conducting expeditionary missions, maintaining a significant overseas presence. The French Navy is one of eight naval forces currently operating fixed-wing aircraft carriers, (Note: Along with the U.S., U.K., China, Italy, India, and Spain; additionally the Russian Navy deploys a single carrier, though it has not been operational since 2017.) with its flagship Charles de Gaulle being the only nuclear-powered aircraft carrier outside the United States Navy, and one of two non-American vessels to use catapults to launch aircraft.

Founded in the 17th century, the French Navy is one of the oldest navies still in continuous service, with precursors dating back to the Middle Ages. It has taken part in key events in French history, including the Napoleonic Wars and both world wars, and played a critical role in establishing and securing the French colonial empire for over 400 years. The French Navy pioneered several innovations in naval technology, including the first steam-powered ship of the line, first seagoing ironclad warship, first mechanically propelled submarine, first steel-hulled warship, and first armoured cruiser.

The French Navy consists of six main components: the Naval Action Force, the Submarine Forces (FOST and ESNA), French Naval Aviation, the Navy Riflemen (including Naval Commandos), the Marseille Naval Fire Battalion, and the Maritime Gendarmerie. As of 2021, the French Navy employed 44,000 personnel (37,000 military and 7,000 civilian), more than 180 ships, 200 aircraft, and six commandos units; as of 2014, its reserve element numbered roughly 48,000.

It operates a wide range of fighting vessels, including various aeronaval forces, attack and ballistic missile submarines, frigates, patrol boats and support ships, with aircraft carrier Charles de Gaulle serving as the centrepiece of most expeditionary forces.

== Origins ==
The history of French naval power dates back to the Middle Ages, and had three loci of evolution:

- The Mediterranean Sea, where the Ordre de Saint-Jean de Jérusalem had its own navy, the Levant Fleet, whose principal ports were Fréjus, Marseille, and Toulon. The Ordre, which was both a religious and military order, recruited knights from the families of French nobility. Members who had fulfilled their service at sea were granted the rank of Knights Hospitaller, elites who served as the officer corps. The Ordre was one of the ancestors of modern French naval schools including the French Naval Academy.
- The Manche along Normandy which, since William the Conqueror, always tendered capable marines and sailors from its numerous active seaports.
- The Atlantic Ocean, where the navy of the Duchy of Brittany eventually constituted the nucleus of the royal Flotte du Ponant, which projected French naval power across the Atlantic and the Americas.

== Names and symbols ==
The historic "Golden Anchor" symbol.

The first true French Royal Navy (French: la Marine Royale) was established in 1626 by Cardinal Richelieu, chief minister to King Louis XIII. During the French Revolution, la Marine Royale was formally renamed la Marine Nationale. Under the First French Empire and the Second French Empire, the navy was designated as the Imperial French Navy (la Marine impériale française). Institutionally, however, the navy has never lost its short familiar nickname, la Royale.

The original symbol of the French Navy was a golden anchor, which, beginning in 1830, was interlaced by a sailing rope; this symbol was featured on all naval vessels, arms, and uniforms. Although anchor symbols are still used on uniforms, a new naval logo was introduced in 1990 under Naval Chief of Staff Bernard Louzeau, featuring a modern design that incorporates the tricolour—by flanking the bow section of a white warship with two ascending red and blue spray foams—and the inscription "Marine nationale".

== History ==
=== 17th century ===
Cardinal Richelieu personally supervised the Navy until his death in 1643. He was succeeded by his protégé, Jean Baptiste Colbert, who introduced the first code of regulations of the French Navy and established the original naval dockyards in Brest and Toulon. Colbert and his son, the Marquis de Seignelay, between them administered the Navy for twenty-nine years.

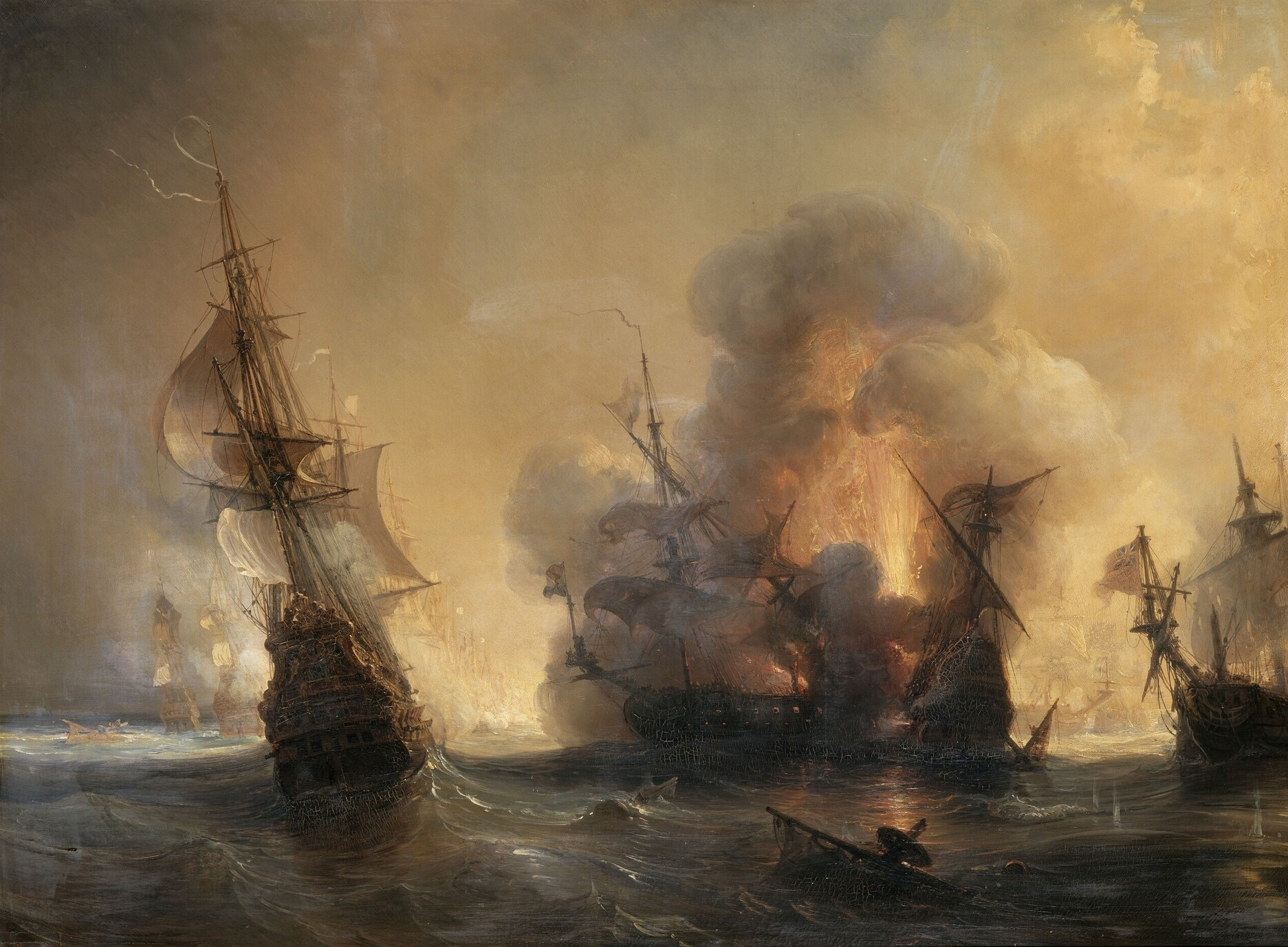
Battle of Lagos, 1693.

During this century, the Navy cut its teeth in the Anglo-French War (1627–1629), the Franco-Spanish War (1635–59), the Second Anglo-Dutch War, the Franco-Dutch War, and the Nine Years' War. Major battles in these years include the Battle of Augusta, Battle of Beachy Head, the Battles of Barfleur and La Hougue, the Battle of Lagos, and the Battle of Texel.

=== 18th century ===
The 1700s opened with the War of the Spanish Succession, over a decade long, followed by the War of the Austrian Succession in the 1740s. Principal engagements of these wars include the Battle of Vigo Bay and two separate Battles of Cape Finisterre in 1747. The most grueling conflict for the Navy, however, was the Seven Years' War, in which it was virtually destroyed. Significant actions include the Battle of Cap-Français, the Battle of Quiberon Bay, and another Battle of Cape Finisterre.

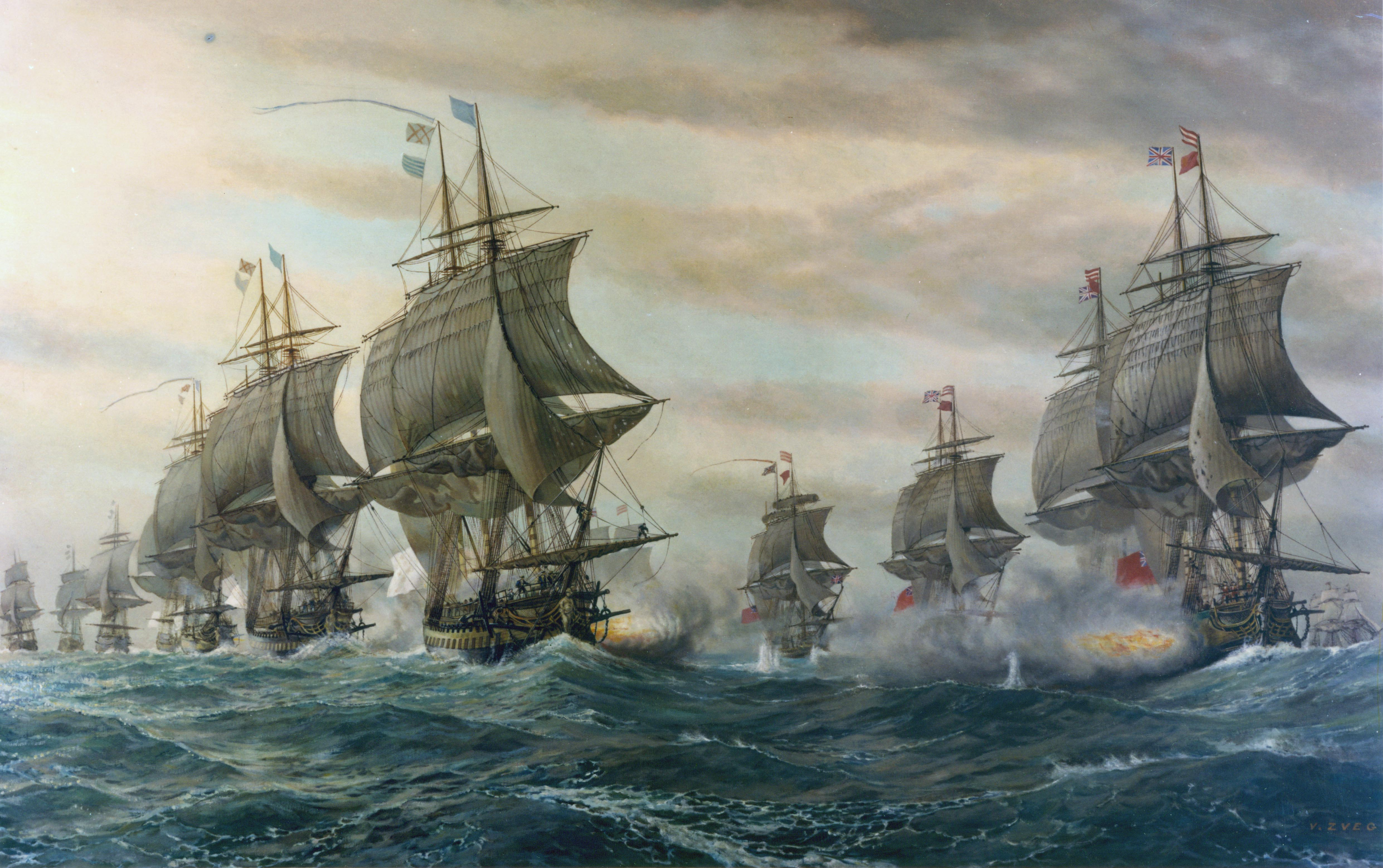
Battle of the Chesapeake, 1781.

The Navy regrouped and rebuilt, and within 15 years it was eager to join the fray when France intervened in the American Revolutionary War. Though outnumbered everywhere, the French fleets held the British at bay for years until victory. After this conflict and the concomitant Anglo-French War (1778–1783), the Navy emerged at a new height in its history. Major battles in these years include the Battle of the Chesapeake, the Battle of Cape Henry, the Battle of Grenada, the invasion of Dominica, and three separate Battles of Ushant.

Within less than a decade, however, the Navy was decimated by the French Revolution when large numbers of veteran officers were dismissed or executed for their noble lineage. Nonetheless, the Navy fought vigorously through the French Revolutionary Wars as well as the Quasi-War. Significant actions include a fourth Battle of Ushant (known in English as the Glorious First of June), the Battle of Groix, the Atlantic campaign of May 1794, the French expedition to Ireland, the Battle of Tory Island, and the Battle of the Nile.

=== 19th century ===
Other engagements of the Revolutionary Wars ensued in the early 1800s, including the Battle of the Malta Convoy and the Algeciras campaign. The Quasi-War wound down with single-ship actions including USS Constellation vs La Vengeance and USS Enterprise vs Flambeau.

When Napoleon was crowned Emperor in 1804, he attempted to restore the Navy to a position that would enable his plan for an invasion of England. His dreams were dashed by the Battle of Trafalgar in 1805, where the British all but annihilated a combined Franco-Spanish fleet, a disaster that confirmed British naval superiority for the rest of the Napoleonic Wars. Still, the Navy did not shrink from action: among the engagements of this time were the Battle of the Basque Roads, the Battle of Grand Port, the Mauritius campaign of 1809–1811, and the Battle of Lissa.

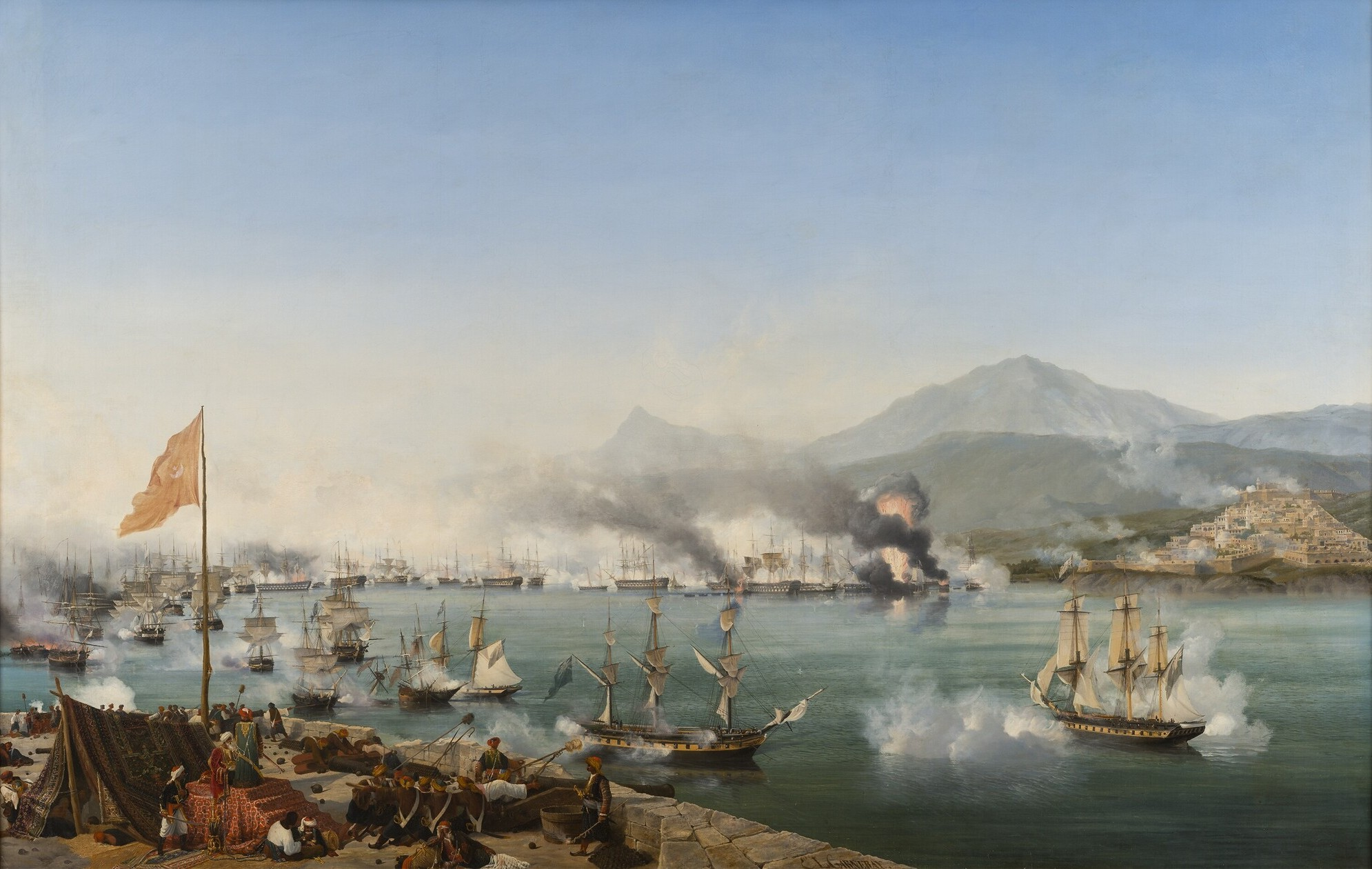
Battle of Navarino, 1827.

After Napoleon's fall in 1815, the long era of Anglo-French rivalry on the seas began to close, and the Navy became more of an instrument for expanding the French colonial empire. Under King Charles X, the two nations' fleets fought side by side in the Battle of Navarino, and throughout the rest of the century they generally behaved in a manner that paved the way for the Entente Cordiale.

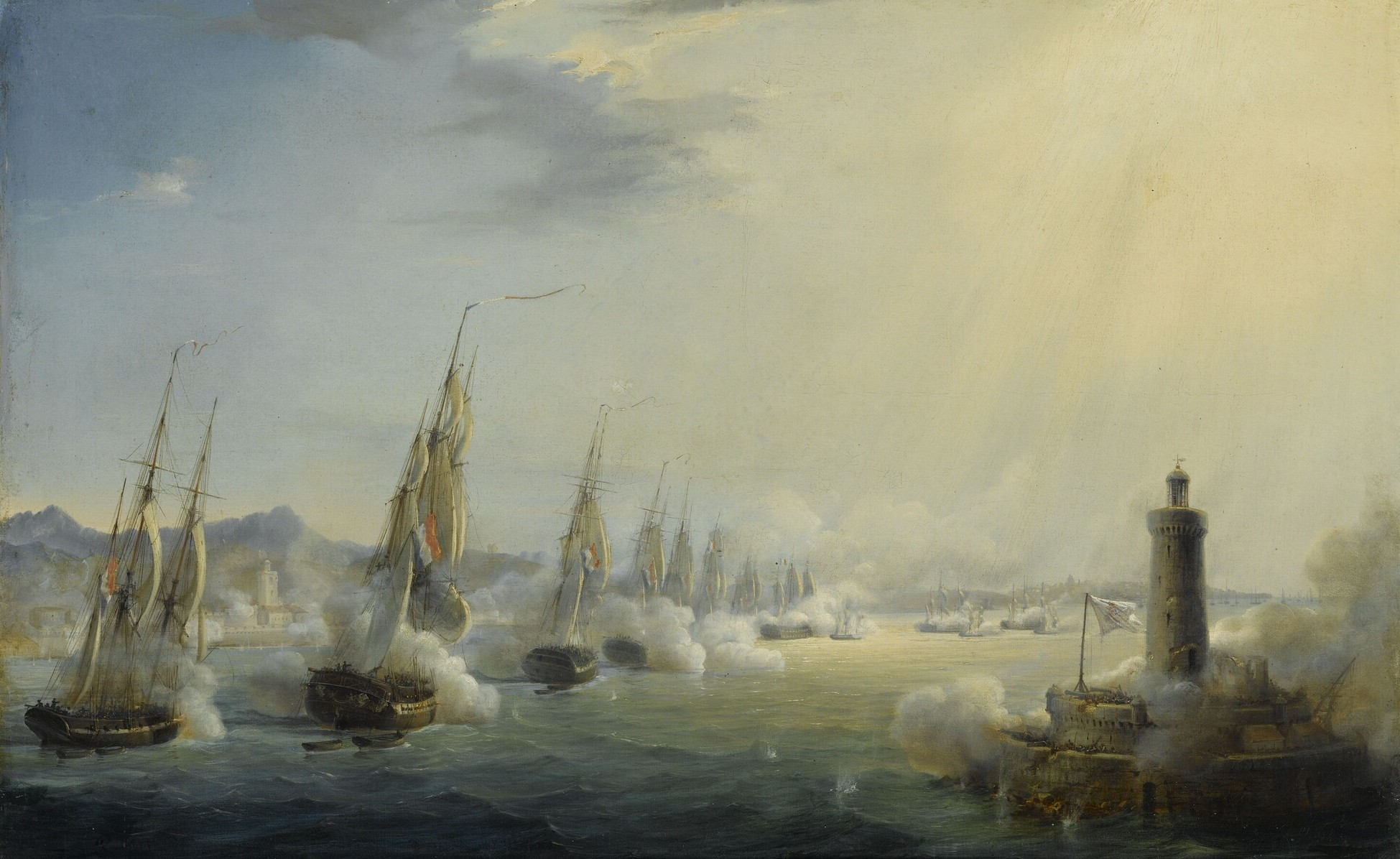
Battle of the Tagus, 1831.

Charles X sent a large fleet to execute the invasion of Algiers in 1830. The next year, his successor, Louis Philippe I, made a show of force against Portugal at the Battle of the Tagus, and in 1838 conducted another display of gunboat diplomacy, this time in Mexico at the Battle of Veracruz. Beginning in 1845, a five-year Anglo-French blockade of the Río de la Plata was imposed on Argentina over trade rights.

The Emperor Napoleon III was determined to follow an even stronger foreign policy than his predecessors, and the Navy was involved in a multitude of actions around the world. He joined in the Crimean War in 1854; major actions for the Navy include the siege of Petropavlovsk and the Battle of Kinburn. The Navy was heavily involved in the Cochinchina Campaign in 1858, the Second Opium War in China, and the French intervention in Mexico. It took part in the French expedition to Korea and the Shimonoseki campaign. In the Franco-Prussian War in 1870, the Navy imposed an effective blockade of Germany, but events on land proceeded at such a rapid pace that it was superfluous. Isolated engagements between French and German ships took place in other theaters, but the war was over in a matter of weeks.

The Navy continued to protect colonial safety and expansion under the French Third Republic. The Sino-French War saw considerable naval action including the Battle of Fuzhou, the Battle of Shipu, and the Pescadores Campaign. In Vietnam, the Navy helped wage the Tonkin Campaign which included the Battle of Thuận An, and it later participated in the Franco-Siamese conflict of 1893.

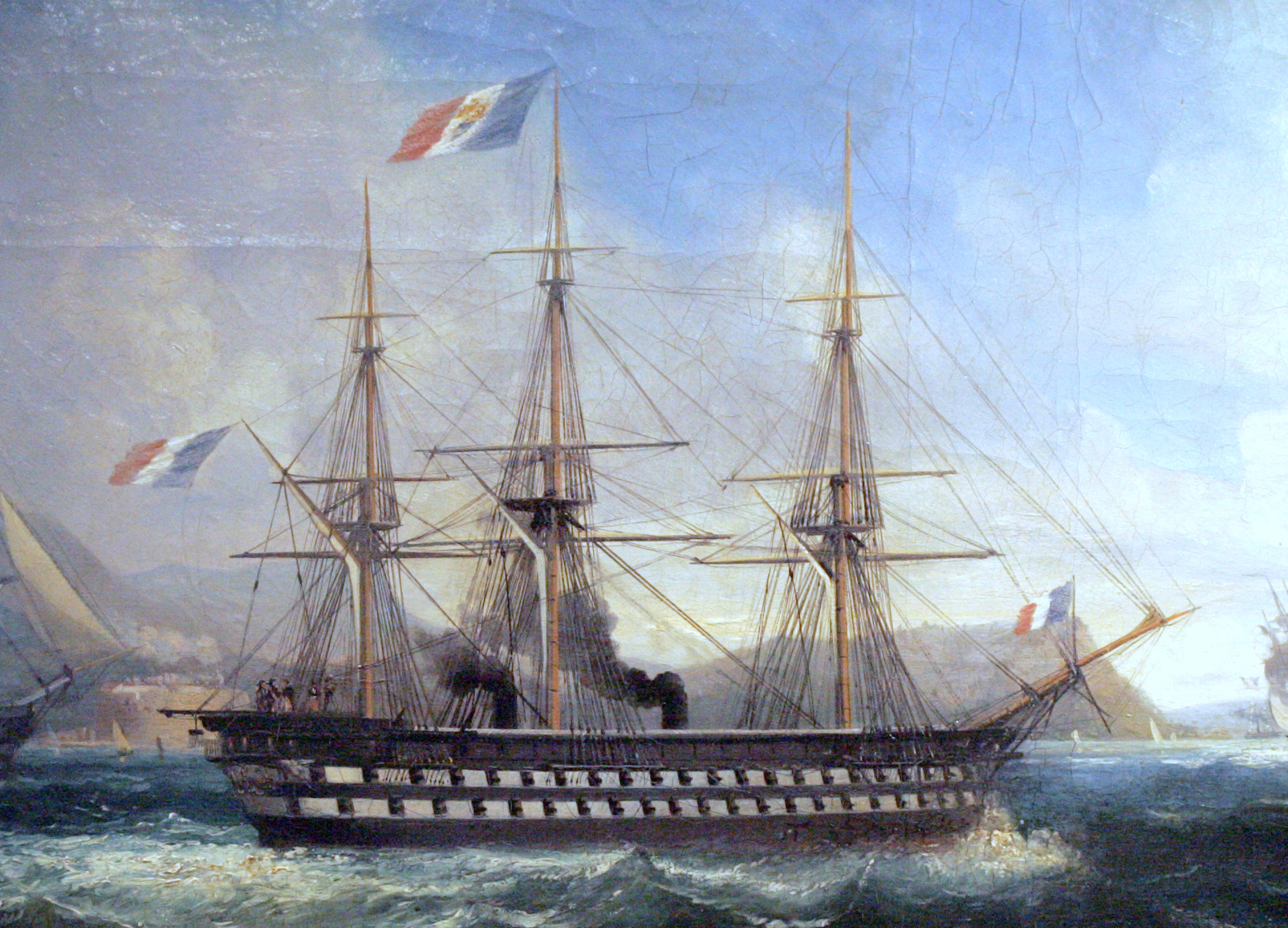
Steam-powered ship of the line Napoléon, 1852.

The 19th century French Navy brought forth numerous new technologies. It led the development of naval artillery with its invention of the highly effective Paixhans gun. In 1850, Napoléon became the first steam-powered ship of the line in history, and Gloire became the first seagoing ironclad warship nine years later. In 1863, the Navy launched Plongeur, the first submarine in the world to be propelled by mechanical power. In 1876, Redoutable became the first steel-hulled warship ever. In 1887, Dupuy de Lôme became the world's first armoured cruiser.

During the latter part of the century, French officers developed the so-called Jeune École (Young School) theory that emphasized the use of small, cheap torpedo boats to destroy expensive battleships, coupled with long-range commerce raiders to attack an opponent's merchant fleet.

=== 20th and 21st centuries ===
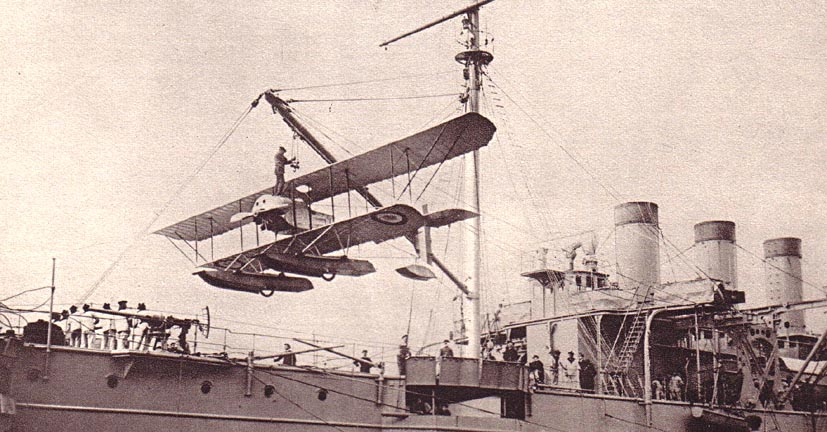
A Caudron seaplane being craned on Foudre, 1914.

The first seaplane, the French Fabre Hydravion, was flown in 1910, and the first seaplane carrier, Foudre, was christened in the following year. Despite that innovation, the general development of the French Navy slowed down in the beginning of the 20th century as the Anglo-German naval arms race grew in intensity.

It entered World War I with relatively few modern vessels, and during the war few warships were built because the main French effort was on land. While the British held control of the North Sea, the French held the Mediterranean, where they mostly kept watch on the Austro-Hungarian Navy. The largest operations of the Navy were conducted during the Dardanelles Campaign. In December 1916, during the Noemvriana events, French warships also bombarded Athens, trying to force the pro-German government of Greece to change its policies. The French Navy also played an important role in countering Germany's U-boat campaign by regularly patrolling the seas and escorting convoys.

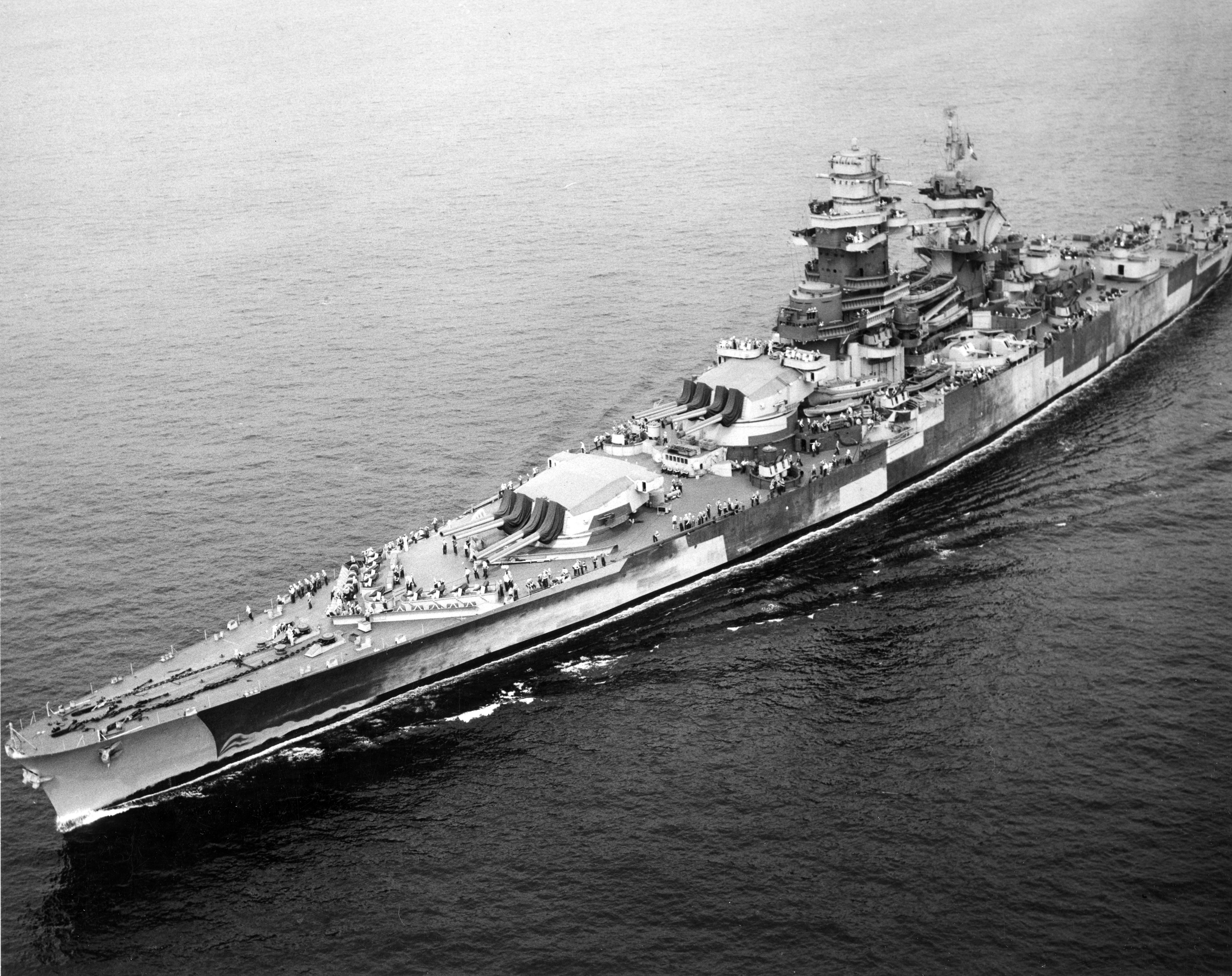
Battleship Richelieu, 1943.

Between the World Wars, the Navy modernized and expanded significantly, even in the face of limitations set by the 1922 Washington Naval Treaty. New additions included the heavy and fast Fantasque-class "super-destroyers", the Richelieu-class battleships, and the submarine Surcouf which was the largest and most powerful of its day.

During the first two years of World War II, the French Navy participated in the Battle of the Atlantic, the Norwegian campaign, the Dunkirk evacuation and, briefly, the Battle of the Mediterranean. However, after the fall of France in June 1940, the Navy was obligated to remain neutral under the terms of the armistice that created Vichy France. Approximately 100 French warships around the world joined the Free French under Charles de Gaulle, but the bulk of the French Navy, including all its capital ships, declared their allegiance to Vichy France. On 3 July 1940, Force H of the Royal Navy launched an attack on Mers-el-Kébir in Algeria to prevent the French fleet there from falling into German hands, destroying or damaging several French warships. In 1942, the Vichy Navy fought the Naval Battle of Casablanca when the Allies invaded French North Africa, but the confrontations were set aside once the Germans occupied Vichy France. The capital ships were a primary target for the Germans, but before they could be seized they were scuttled by their own crews. A few small ships and submarines managed to escape in time, and these joined the Free French Naval Forces, an arm of Free France that fought as an adjunct of the Royal Navy until the end of the war. In the Pacific theatre as well, Free French vessels operated until the Japanese capitulation; Richelieu was present at the Japanese Instrument of Surrender.

The Navy later provided fire support and troop transport in the Indochina War, the Algerian War, the Gulf War, and the Kosovo War.

Since 2000, the Navy has given logistical support to the War in Afghanistan (2001–2021) as well as the global war on terror. In 2011, it assisted Opération Harmattan in Libya.

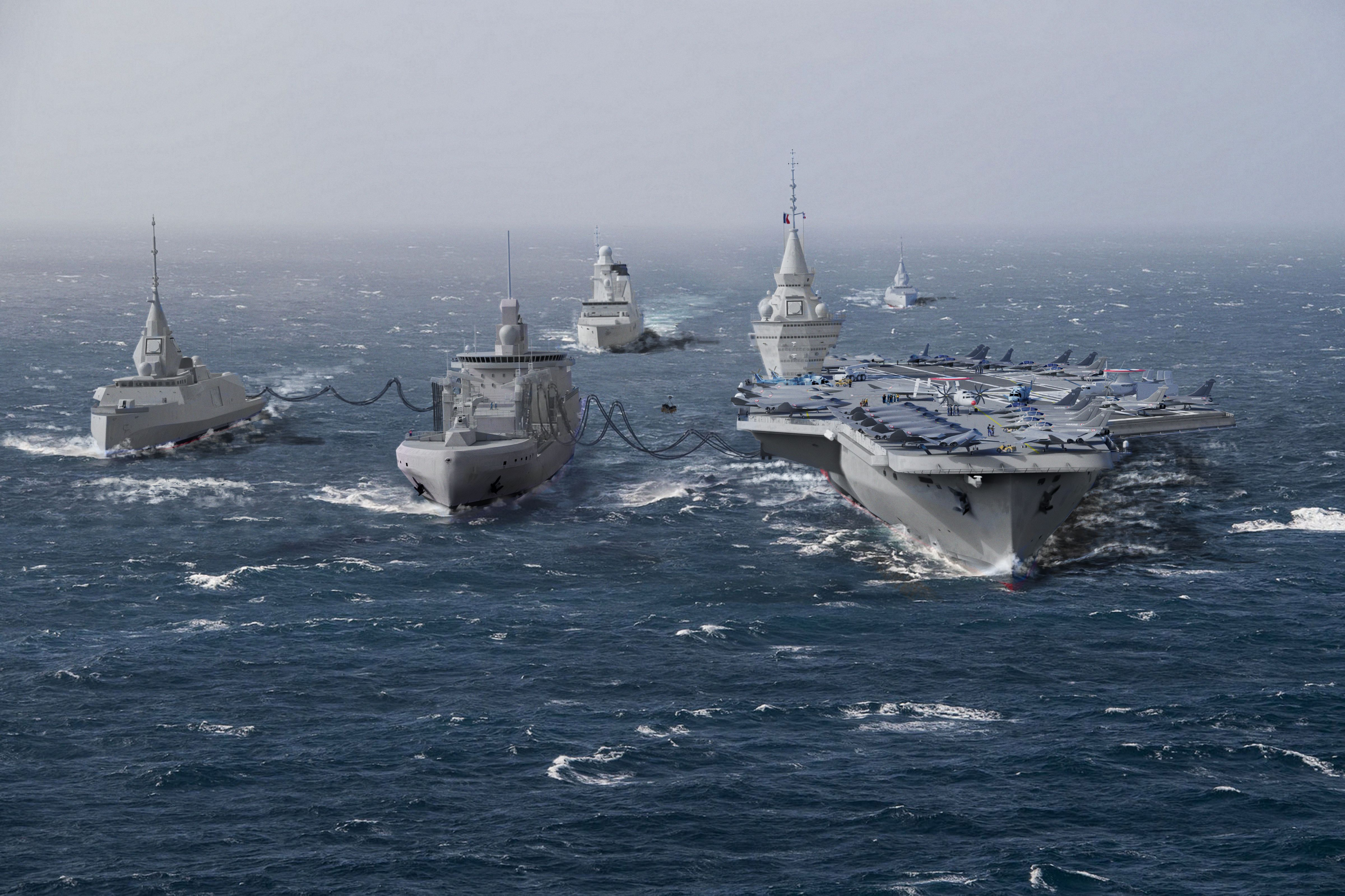
The French Navy as planned for the late 2030s: a Bâtiment ravitailleur de forces (fleet tanker) conducts simultaneous underway replenishment with the Future French aircraft carrier and with a Frégate de défense et d'intervention (Defence and Intervention Frigate).

== Organisation ==
The chief of the naval staff is Amiral Nicolas Vaujour, and as of November 2024 the Navy has an active strength of 37,965 military personnel and 3,000 civilian staff. The Navy is organised into four main operational branches:

- The Force d'Action Navale (Naval Action Force) – Surface fleet.
- The Forces Sous-marines (Submarine forces) – Nuclear-powered ballistic missile submarines and fleet submarines.
- The Aviation Navale (Naval air force) – Ground and sea-based aircraft.
- The Fusiliers Marins (Naval riflemen) – Protection force and infantry including the Navy special forces (Commandos Marine).

In addition, the National Gendarmerie of France maintain a maritime force of patrol boats that falls under the operational command of the French Navy:

- The Gendarmerie maritime – The coast guard of France.

During most of the Cold War, the Navy was organised in two squadrons based in Brest and Toulon, commanded by ALESCLANT (Amiral commandant l'escadre de l'Atlantique) and ALESCMED (Amiral commandant l'escadre de la Méditerranée) respectively. Since the post-Cold War restructuring process named Optimar '95, the two components have been divided into the Naval Action Force (commanded by ALFAN) and the Antisubmarine Group (commanded by ALGASM).

=== Main naval bases ===
French navy facilities in metropolitan France (status 2015).

As of 2014, the largest French naval base is the military port of Toulon. Other major bases in metropolitan France are the Brest Arsenal and Île Longue on the Atlantic, and Cherbourg Naval Base on the English Channel. Overseas French bases include Fort de France and Degrad des Cannes in the Americas; Port des Galets and Dzaoudzi in the Indian Ocean; and Nouméa and Papeete in the Pacific. In addition, the navy shares or leases bases in foreign locales such as Abu Dhabi, Dakar and Djibouti.

== Equipment ==
=== Ships and submarines ===
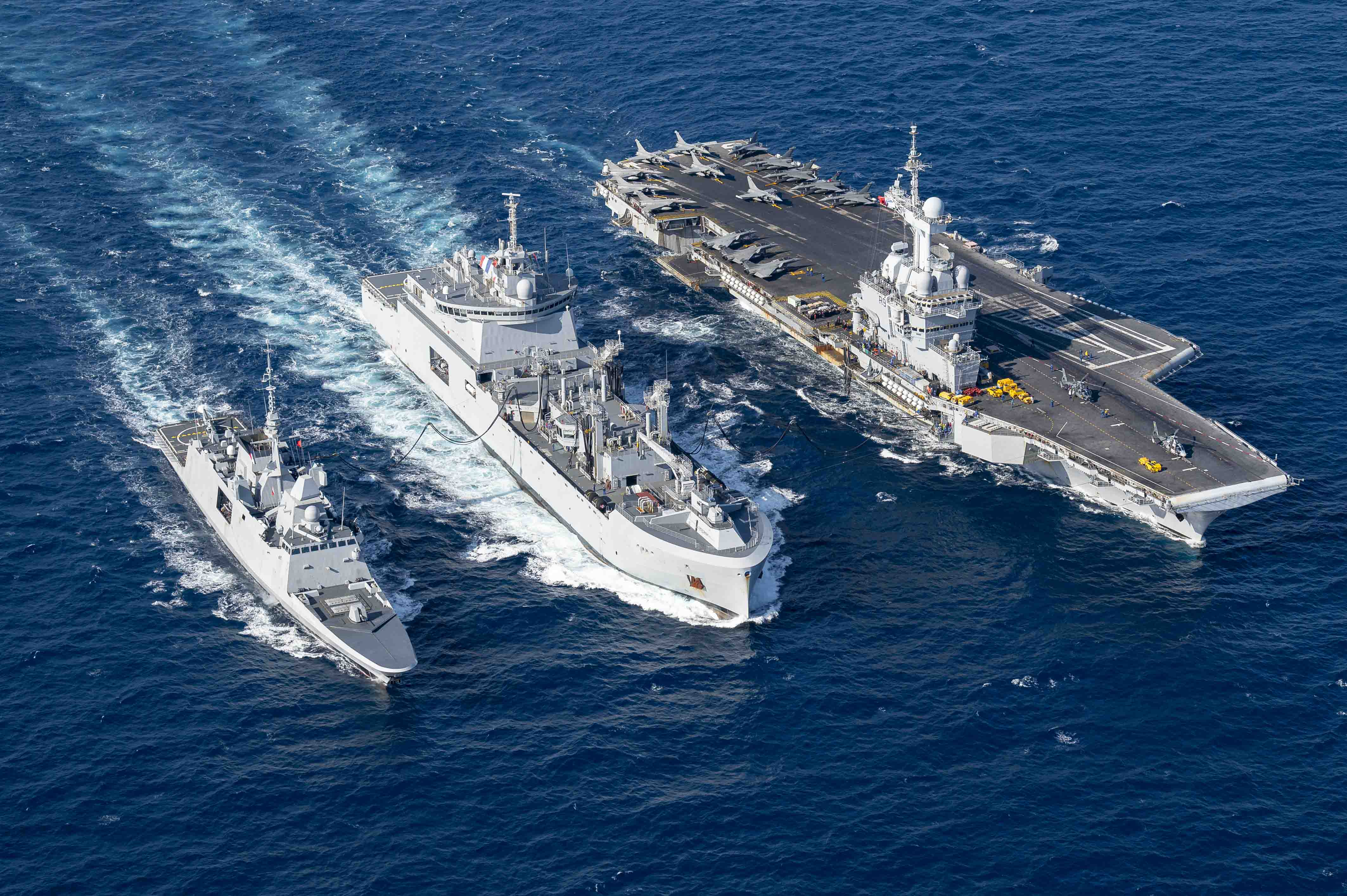
The BRF Jacques Chevalier conducting replenishment at sea with Charles de Gaulle and Alsace FREMM-DA.

Although French naval doctrine calls for two aircraft carriers, the French only have one, Charles de Gaulle. Originally a planned order for French aircraft carrier PA2 was based on the design of the British Queen Elizabeth-class aircraft carrier recently constructed and launched for the Royal Navy. However, the French programme had been delayed several times for budgetary reasons and the result was priority being given to the more exportable FREMM project. In April 2013 it was confirmed that the second aircraft carrier project would be abandoned due to defence cuts announced in the 2013 French White Paper on Defence and National Security.

The French Navy operates three amphibious assault ships, eleven destroyers (classified in the French Navy as surface combatants of the "first rank"), five general purpose frigates and has a commitment to six fleet submarines (SSNs). These vessels, with the aircraft carrier Charles de Gaulle, constitute the French Navy's main ocean-going war-fighting force, while the four ballistic missile submarines (SSBN) of the navy's Strategic Oceanic Force provide the backbone of the French nuclear deterrent.

According to the Ministry of Armed Forces the list of active French Navy ships in 2025 include:

==== Strategic Oceanic Force ====
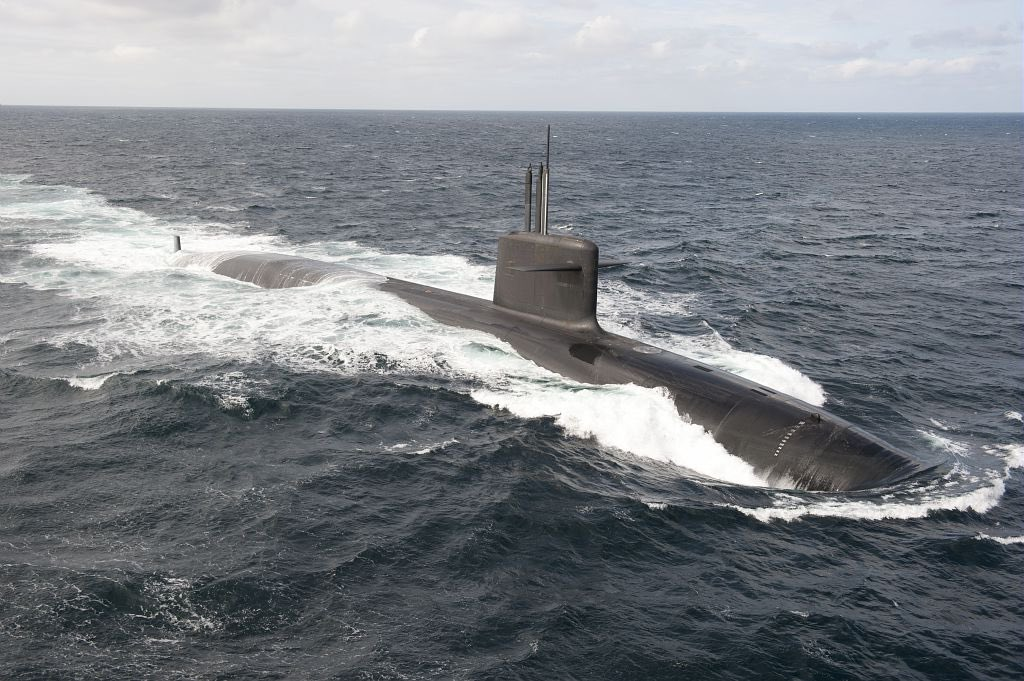
Le Triomphant class (SNLE) nuclear ballistic missile submarine.

- 4 Le Triomphant class (SNLE) nuclear ballistic missile submarines

==== Fighting force ====
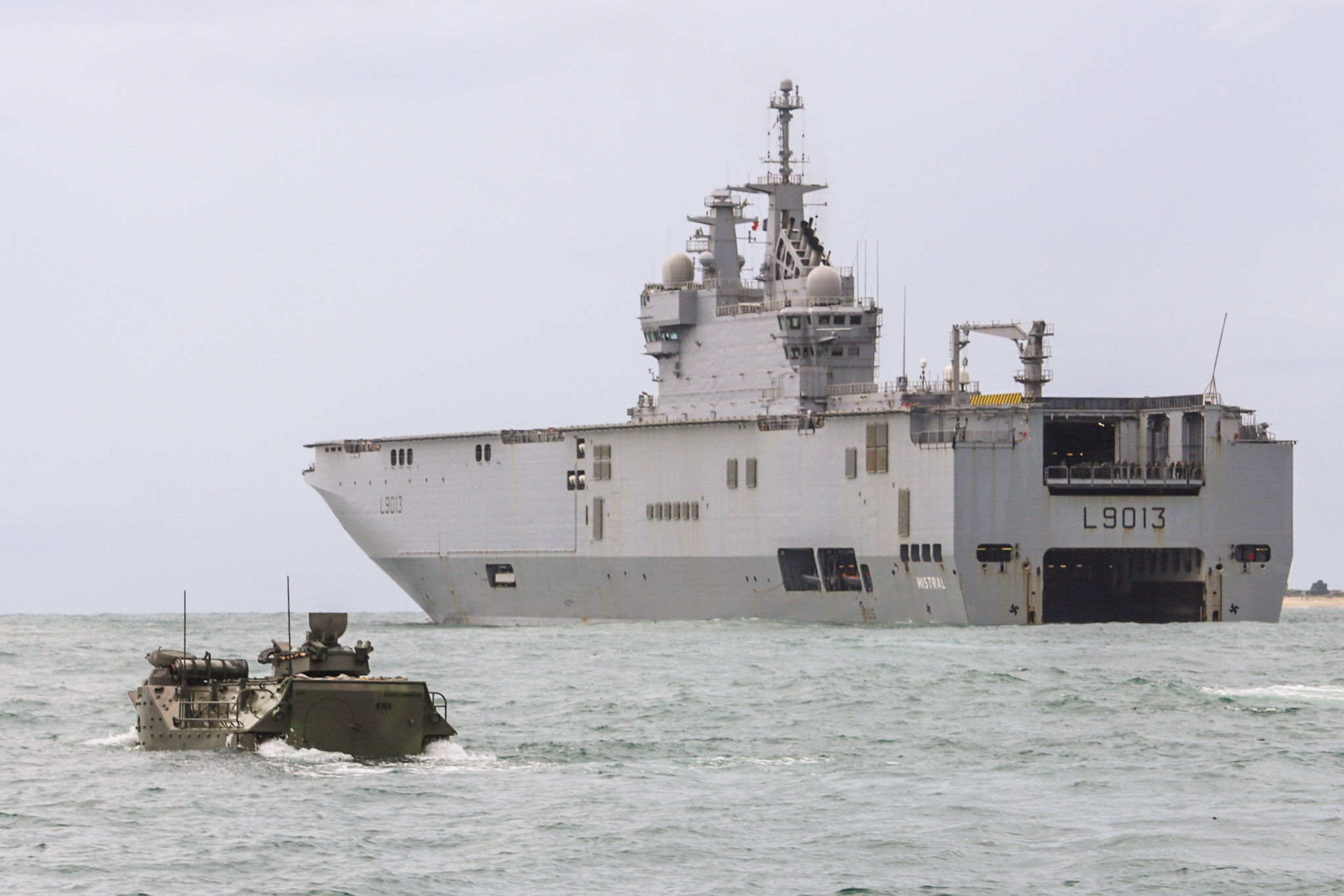
Mistral class (PHA) landing helicopter dock.

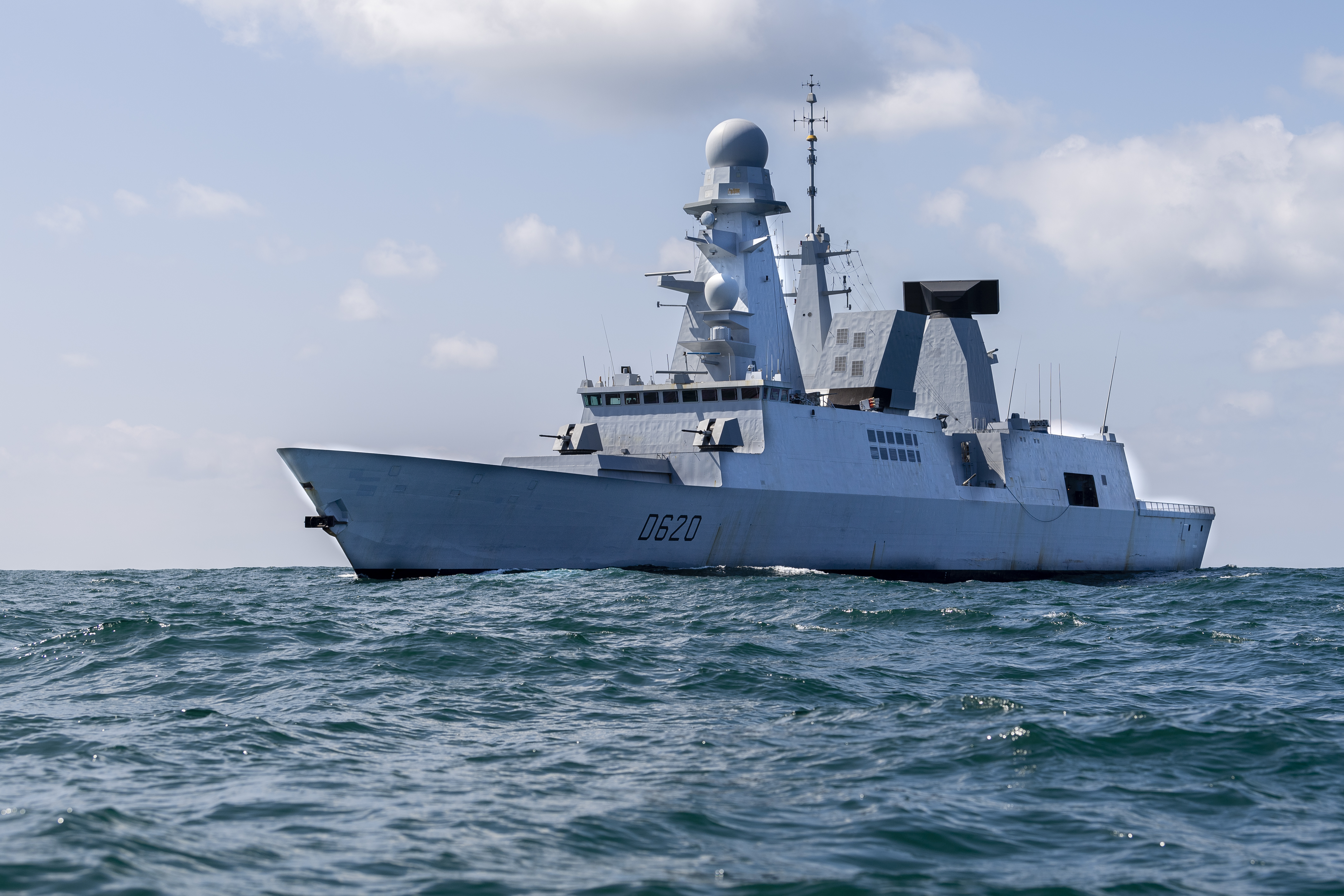
Horizon class (FDA) air defense destroyer.

- 4 Suffren class (SNA) nuclear attack submarines
- 1 Rubis class (SNA) nuclear attack submarine (to retire by 2027)
- 1 Charles de Gaulle (PA) aircraft carrier
- 3 Mistral class (PHA) landing helicopter docks
- 2 Horizon class (FDA) air defense destroyers
- 6 Aquitaine class (FREMM) anti-submarine destroyers
- 2 Alsace class (FREMM-DA) air defense destroyers
- 1 Ronarc'h class (FDI) multi purpose destroyer
- 5 La Fayette class (FLF) general purpose frigates

==== Offshore patrol fleet ====
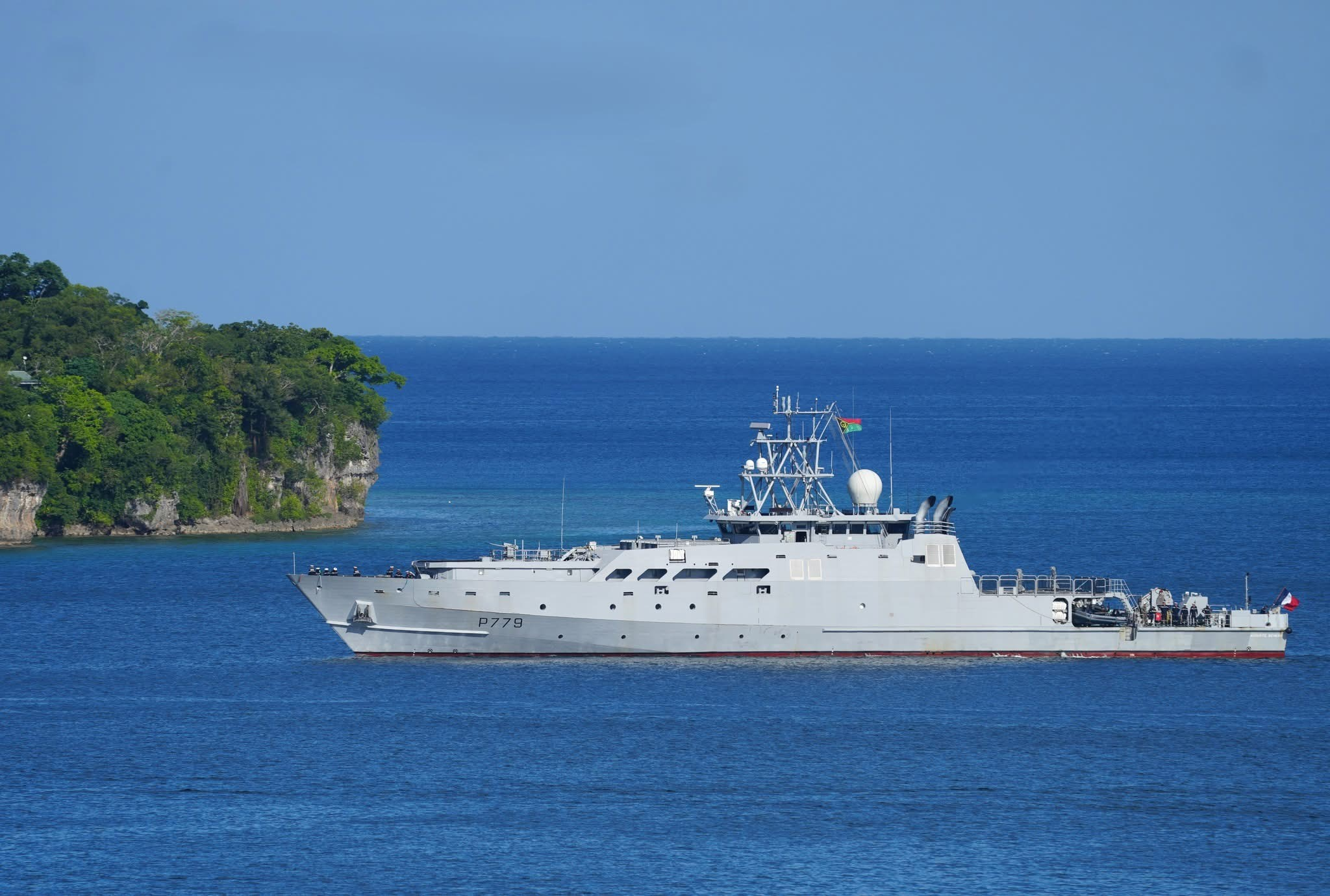
Auguste Bénébig class (POM) offshore patrol vessel.

- 6 Floréal class (FS) light surveillance frigates
- 4 Auguste Bénébig class (POM) offshore patrol vessels
- 3 La Confiance class (PAG) light patrol vessels
- 1 d'Estienne d'Orves class (PHM) offshore patrol vessel
- 3 Flamant class (PSP) light patrol vessels
- 4 Le Malin, Fulmar, Beuzeval and l'Arago (PAT) coastguard patrol boats
- 1 L'Astrolabe (PP) ice breaker and support ship

==== Auxiliary fleet ====
- 1 Durance class (BCR) replenishment ship
- 2 Jacques Chevalier class (BRF) replenishment ships
- 23 mine warfare vessels:
  - 8 Tripartite class (CMT) minehunters
  - 1 Thétis (BEGM) experimental ship
  - 2 Antarès class (BRS) sonar towing vessels
  - 4 Vulcain class (BBPD) clearance diving vessels
  - 5 Ophrys class (VSP) diving support vessels
  - 3 Thales uncrewed mine warfare boats
- 4 d'Entrecasteaux class (BSAOM) multimission support and patrol ships
- 4 Loire class (BSAM) multimission support and patrol ships
- 7 Special vessels:
  - 1 Beautemps-Beaupré (BHO) oceanographic research vessel
  - 3 Lapérouse class (BH2C) hydrographic research vessels
  - 1 Monge (BEM) tracking ship
  - 1 Dupuy-de-Lôme (BRE) signals intelligence ship
  - 1 Alizé (BSP) foreign intelligence ship

=== Aircraft ===
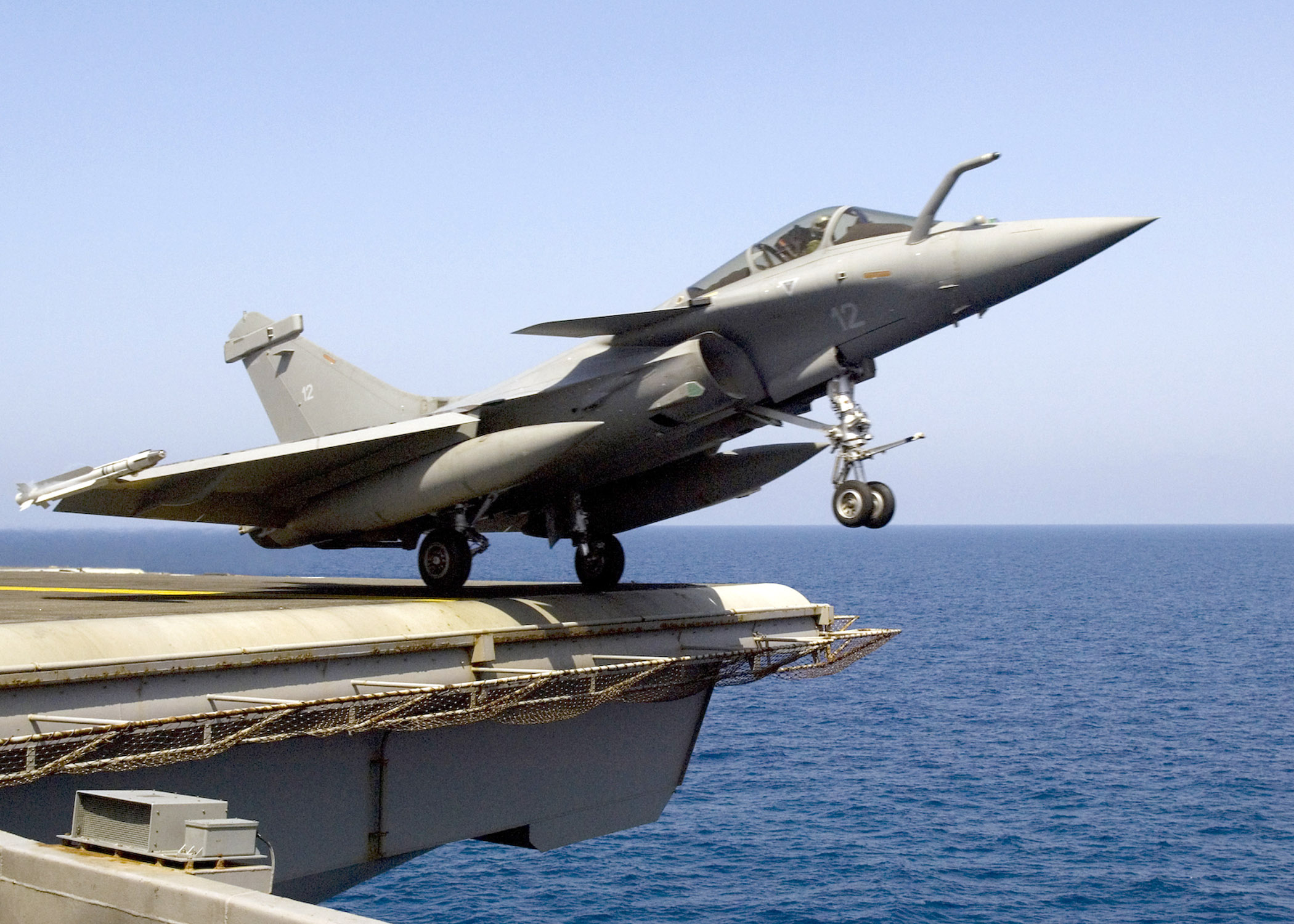
Dassault Rafale M multirole fighter.

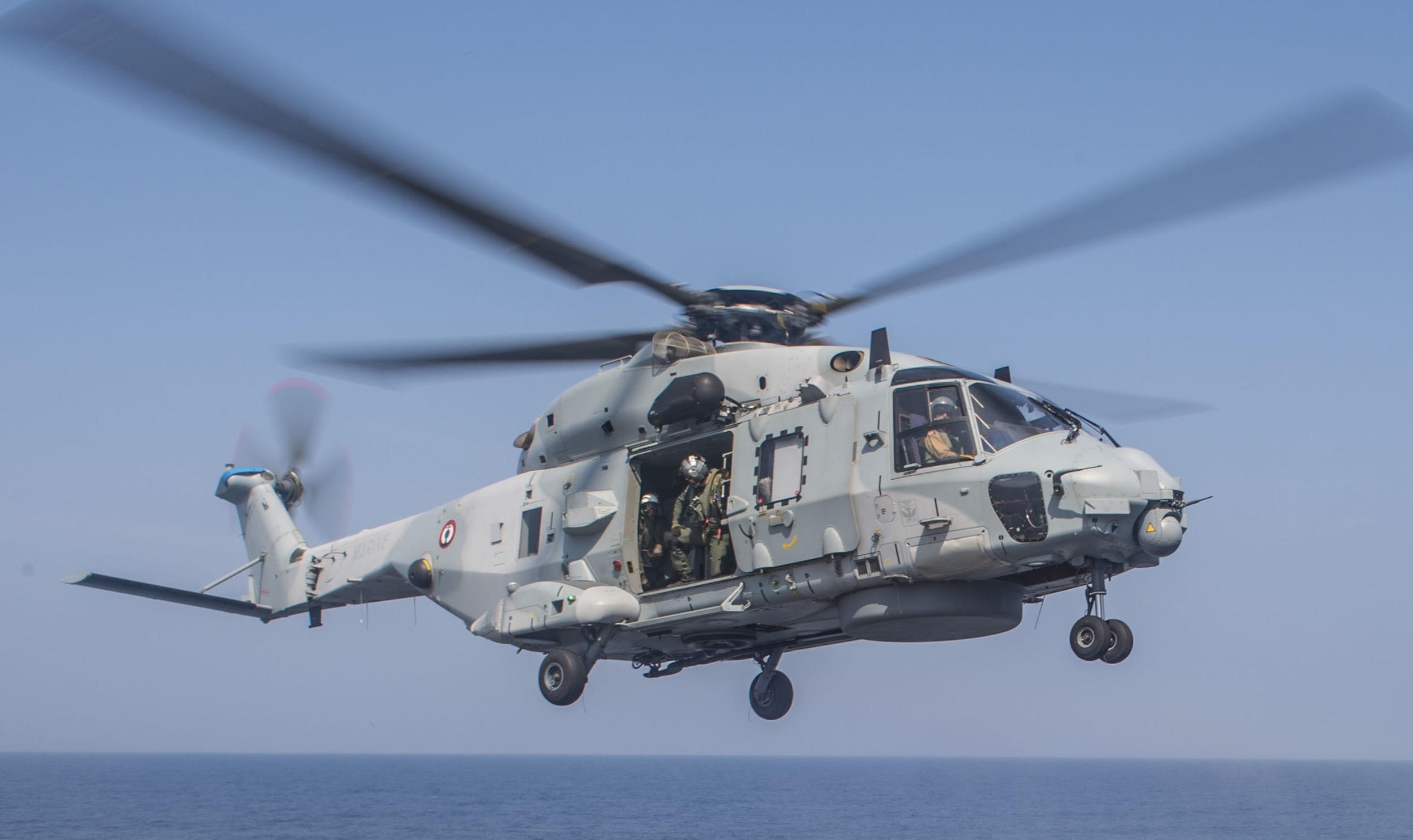
NH90 Caïman naval operations helicopter.

The French Naval Aviation is officially known as the Aéronautique navale and was created on the 19 June 1998 with the merging of Naval patrol aircraft and aircraft carrier squadrons. It has a strength of around 6,800 civilian and military personnel operating from four airbases in Metropolitan France. The Aéronavale has been modernized with 41 Rafale fighters which operate from the aircraft carrier Charles de Gaulle.

==== Carrier air group ====
- 41 Dassault Rafale M multirole fighter
- 3 Grumman E-2 Hawkeye AEW-C turboprop

==== Maritime patrol ====
- 22 Dassault-Bréguet Atlantique 2 long range turboprop
- 8 Dassault Falcon 50M long range trijet
- 5 Dassault Falcon 200 Guardian long range jet

==== Rotorcraft ====
- 27 NH90 Caïman naval operations helicopters
- 16 AS565 Panther multipurpose helicopters
- 21 AS365 Dauphin support and SAR helicopters
- 6 H160 M support and SAR helicopters

== Personnel ==
Personnel strength of the French Navy 2024
| Category | Strength |
| Commissioned officers | 5,298 |
| Petty officers | 24,543 |
| Seamen | 7,852 |
| Volunteers | 272 |
| Civilian employees | 3,000 |
Source: Dossier d'information 2025

=== Application requirement ===
==== Seamen ====
Seamen must be at least 17 but no more than 30 years old, with no minimum level of schooling.

==== Petty officers ====
Petty officers must be at least 17 but no more than 30 years old, with at least a high school diploma giving access to university studies.

Petty officer candidates begin training with five months at the Petty Officer School of Maistrance at Brest.

==== Contract officers ====
Contract officers serve on an initial eight-year contract, renewable up to 20 years.

- Operational officers must be 21 to 26 years old, with at least a Bachelor of Science degree, or having passed a classe préparatoire aux grandes écoles in engineering or business.
- Staff officers have to be 21 to 29 years old, with an honors degree or master's degree in a field corresponding to the military occupational specialty.

==== Career officers ====
- Less than 22 years old, having passed a classe préparatoire in science. After four years at the École Navale (naval academy) a cadet will graduate as a commissioned Enseigne de Vaisseau with an engineering degree.
- Less than 25 years old, having an honors degree in science. After three years at the naval academy a cadet will graduate as Enseigne de Vaisseau with an engineering degree.
- Less than 27 years old, having a master's degree. After two years at the naval academy a cadet will graduate as an Enseigne de Vaisseau.

== Customs and traditions ==
=== Ranks ===
The rank insignia of the French Navy are worn on shoulder straps of shirts and white jackets, and on sleeves for navy jackets and mantels. Until 2005, only commissioned officers had an anchor on their insignia, but enlisted personnel are now receiving them as well. Commanding officers have titles of capitaine, but are called commandant (in the army, both capitaine and commandant are ranks, which tends to stir some confusion among the public). The two highest ranks, vice-amiral d'escadre and amiral (admiral), are functions, rather than ranks. They are assumed by officers ranking vice-amiral (vice admiral). The only amiral de la flotte (Admiral of the Fleet) was François Darlan after he was refused the dignity of amiral de France (Admiral of France). Equivalent to the dignity of Marshal of France, the rank of amiral de France remains theoretical in the Fifth Republic; it was last granted in 1869, during the Second Empire, but retained during the Third Republic until the death of its bearer in 1873. The title of amiral de la flotte was created so that Darlan would not have an inferior rank than his counterpart in the British Royal Navy, who had the rank of Admiral of the Fleet.

==== Commissioned officer ranks ====
The rank insignia of commissioned officers.

| NATO code | OF-10 | OF-9 | OF-8 | OF-7 | OF-6 | OF-5 | OF-4 | OF-3 | OF-2 | OF-1 |
|---|---|---|---|---|---|---|---|---|---|---|---|
| French Navy |
| French Navy | Amiral de France | Amiral | Vice-amiral d'escadre | Vice-amiral | Contre-amiral | Capitaine de vaisseau | Capitaine de frégate | Capitaine de corvette | Lieutenant de vaisseau | Enseigne de vaisseau de 1^{re} classe | Enseigne de vaisseau de 2^{e} classe |

==== Other ranks ====
The rank insignia of non-commissioned officers and enlisted personnel.

| NATO code | OR-9 | | OR-8 | OR-7 | OR-6 | OR-5 | OR-4 | OR-3 | OR-2 | OR-1 |
|---|---|---|---|---|---|---|---|---|---|---|
| French Navy |
| French Navy | Major | Maître principal | Premier maître | | Maître | Second-maître | Quartier-maître de 1^{ère} classe | Quartier-maître de 2^{ème} classe | Matelot breveté | Matelot |

=== Addressing officers ===
Unlike in the French Army and Air and Space Force, one does not prepend mon to the name of the rank when addressing an officer (that is, not mon capitaine, but simply capitaine).

=== Uniforms ===
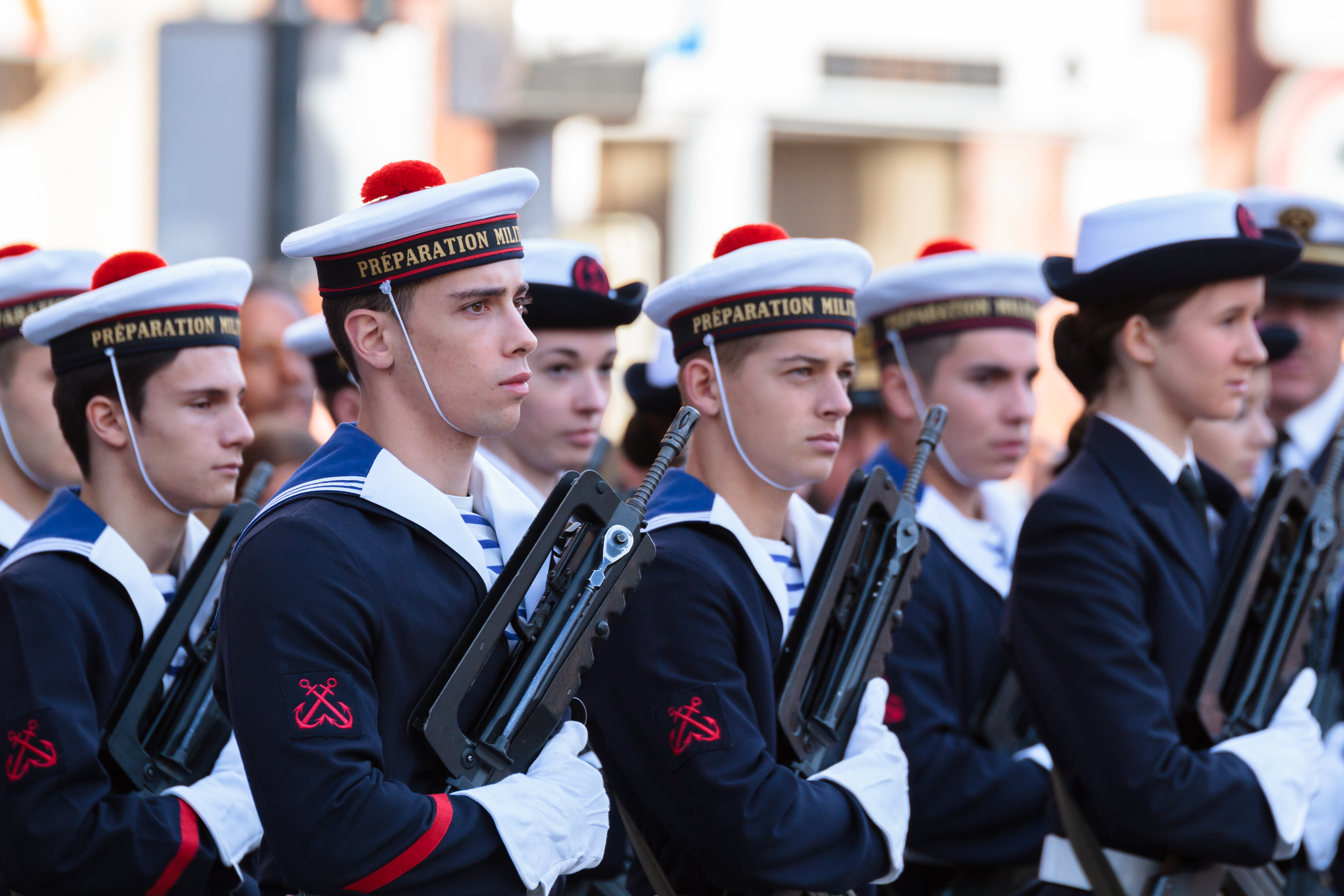
Sailors during the November 11 ceremony in Toulouse.

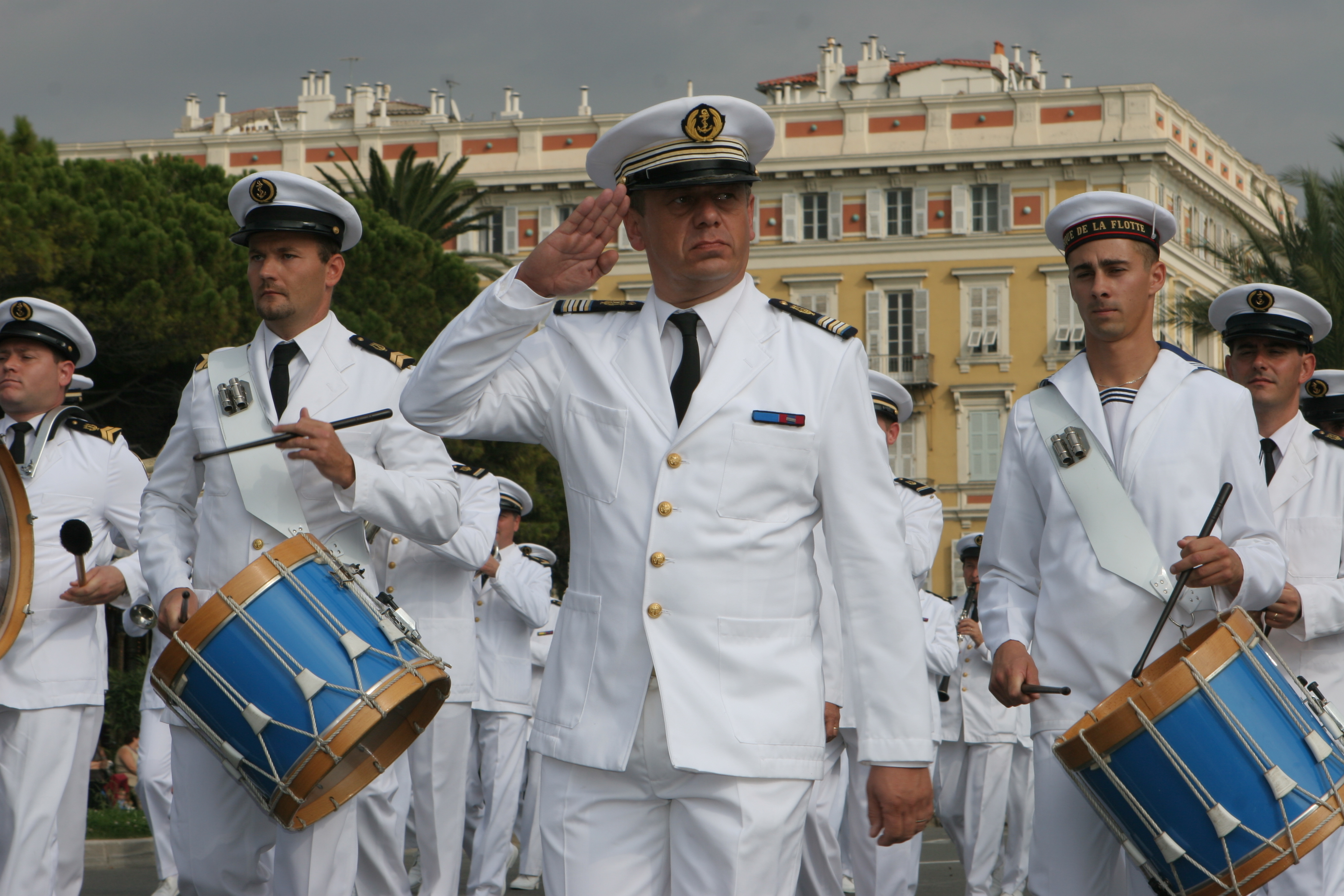
Sailors during a parade in Nice.

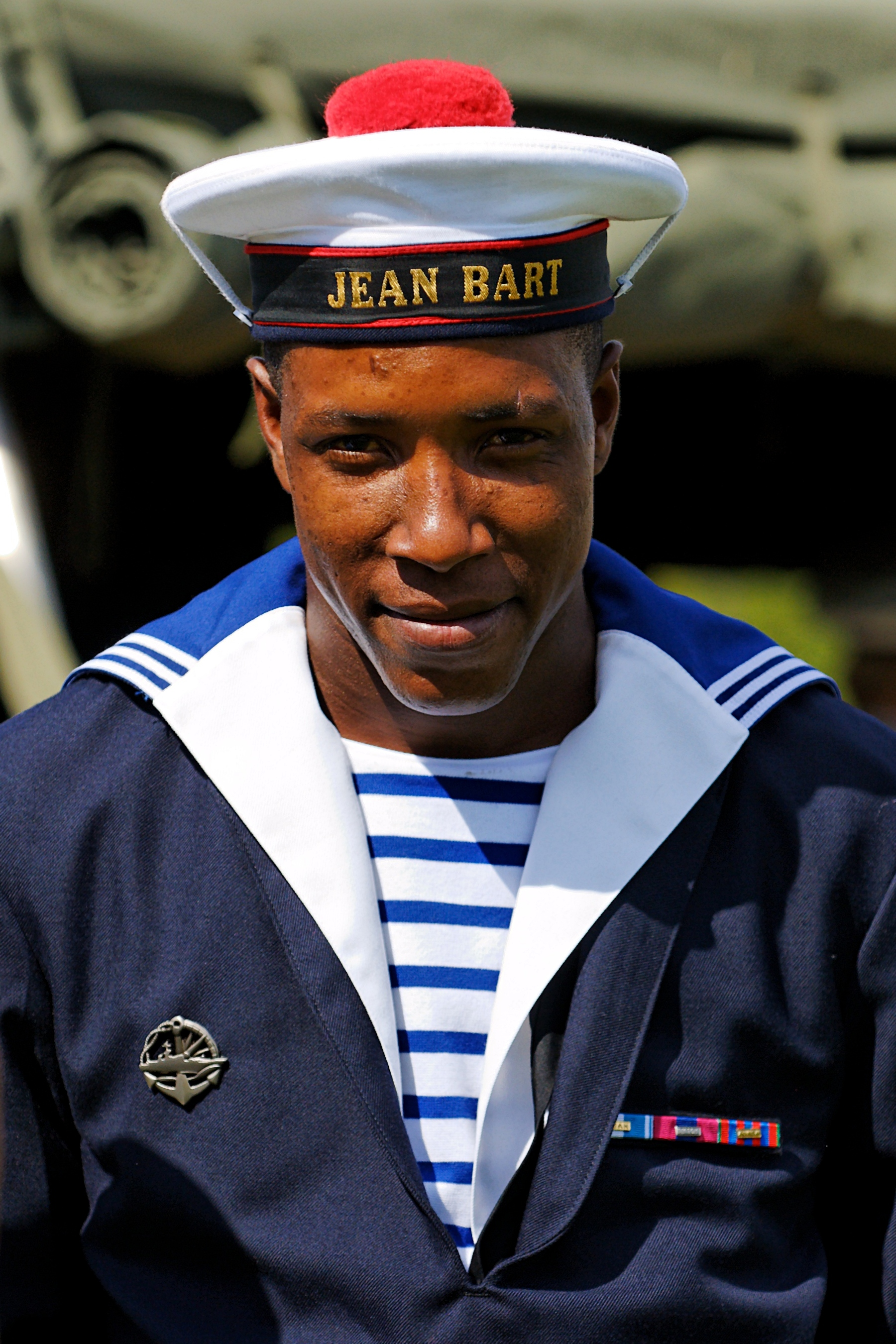
French Navy ceremonial uniform.

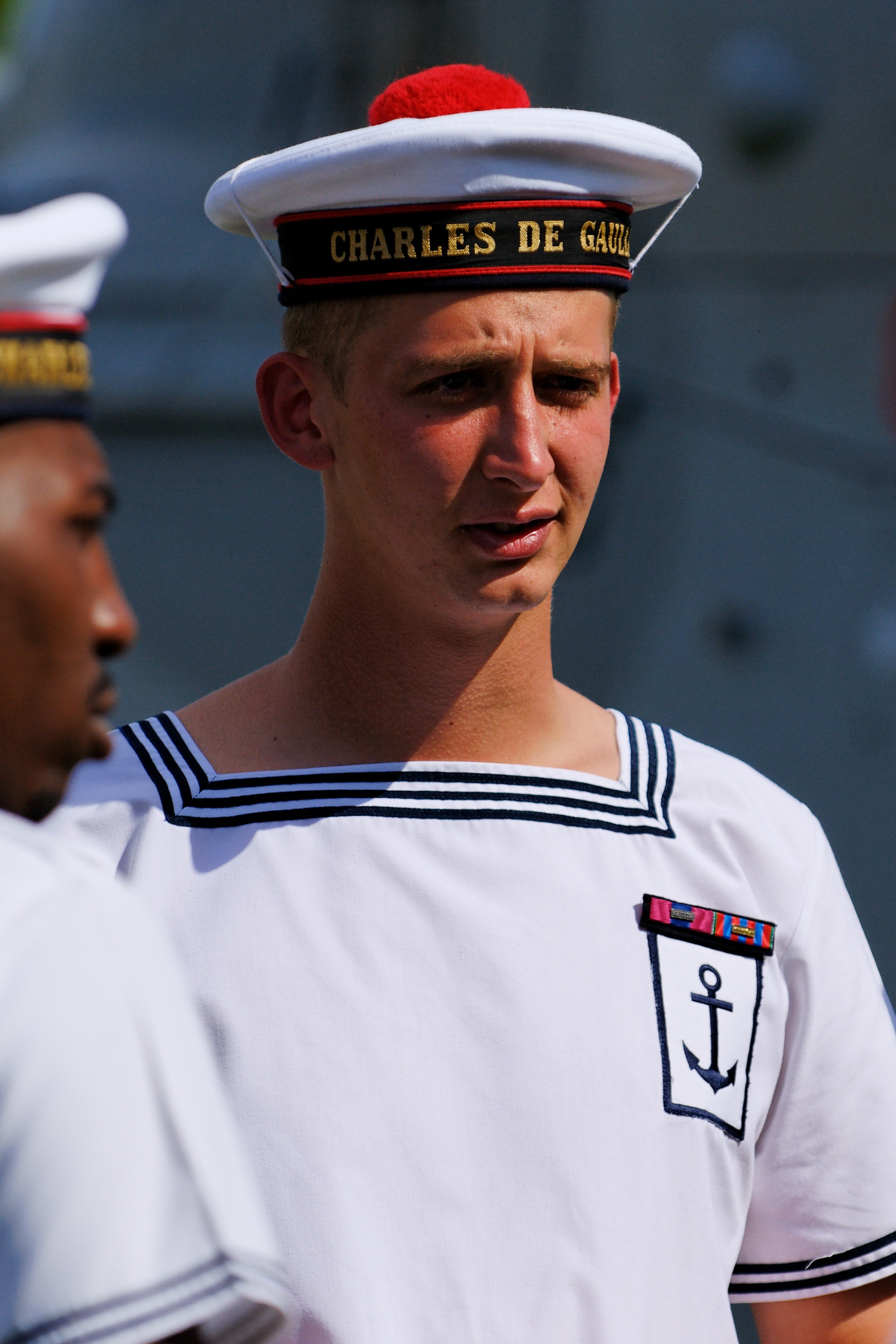
French Navy summer uniform.

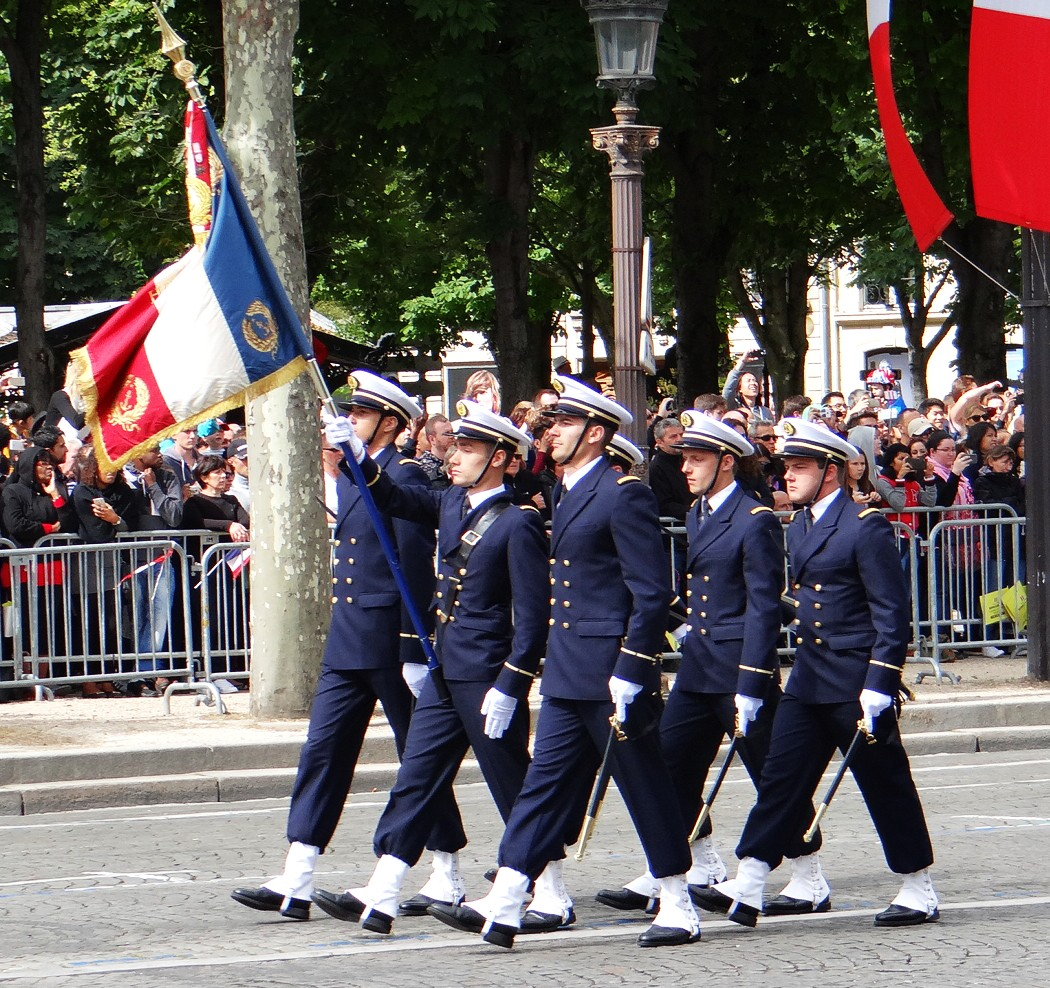
Naval School parading on July 14 in Paris.

=== Military music ===
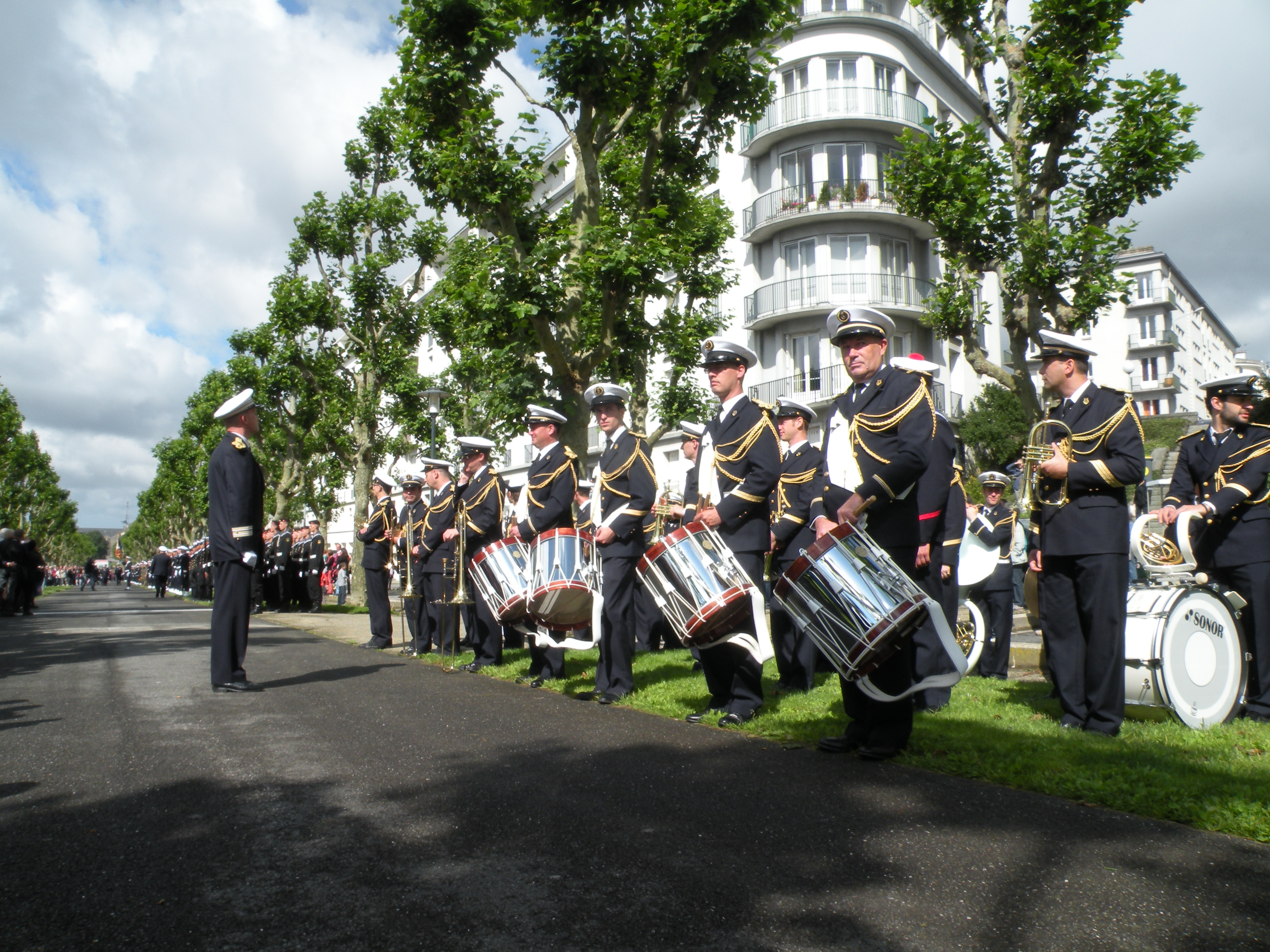
The Brest band before its deactivation in 2012.

The main military musical unit of the French Navy is the Military Band of the Toulon Fleet (French: La musique des équipages de la flotte de Toulon), founded on 13 July 1827. The Bagad Lann Bihoue, based on the bagad bands in Bretagne, is currently the sole pipe band in the service of the French Navy, which uses bagpipes and bombards, and thus is affiliated to the band.

In Canada, French naval music has affected the traditions of Canadian navy bands. French navy bands in the country date back to the era of New France. Musical units were primarily attached to the Compagnies Franches de la Marine and the Troupes de la marine, the former of which maintained two drums (tambour) and a fife.

== Future ==
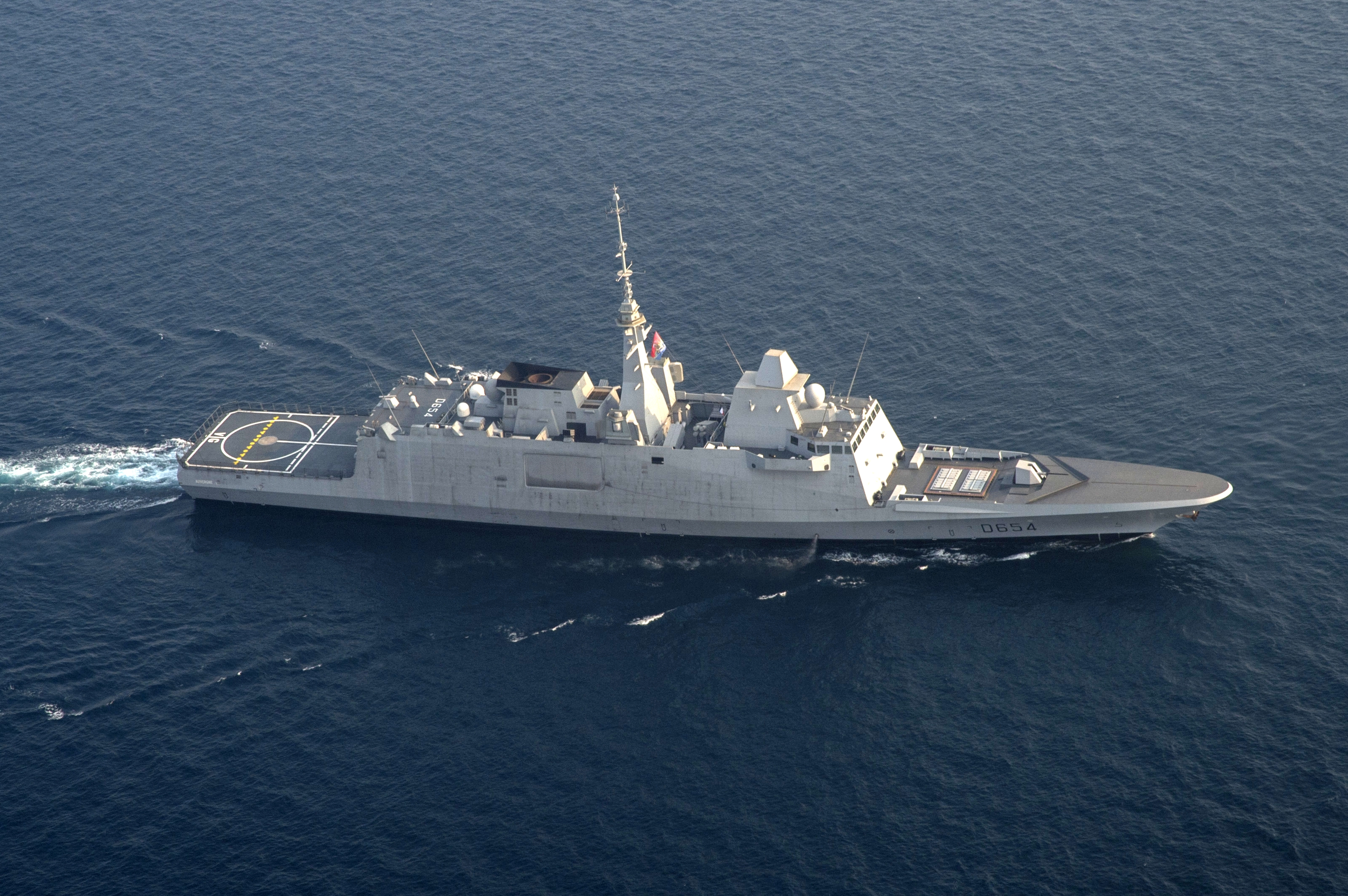
FREMM multipurpose frigate.

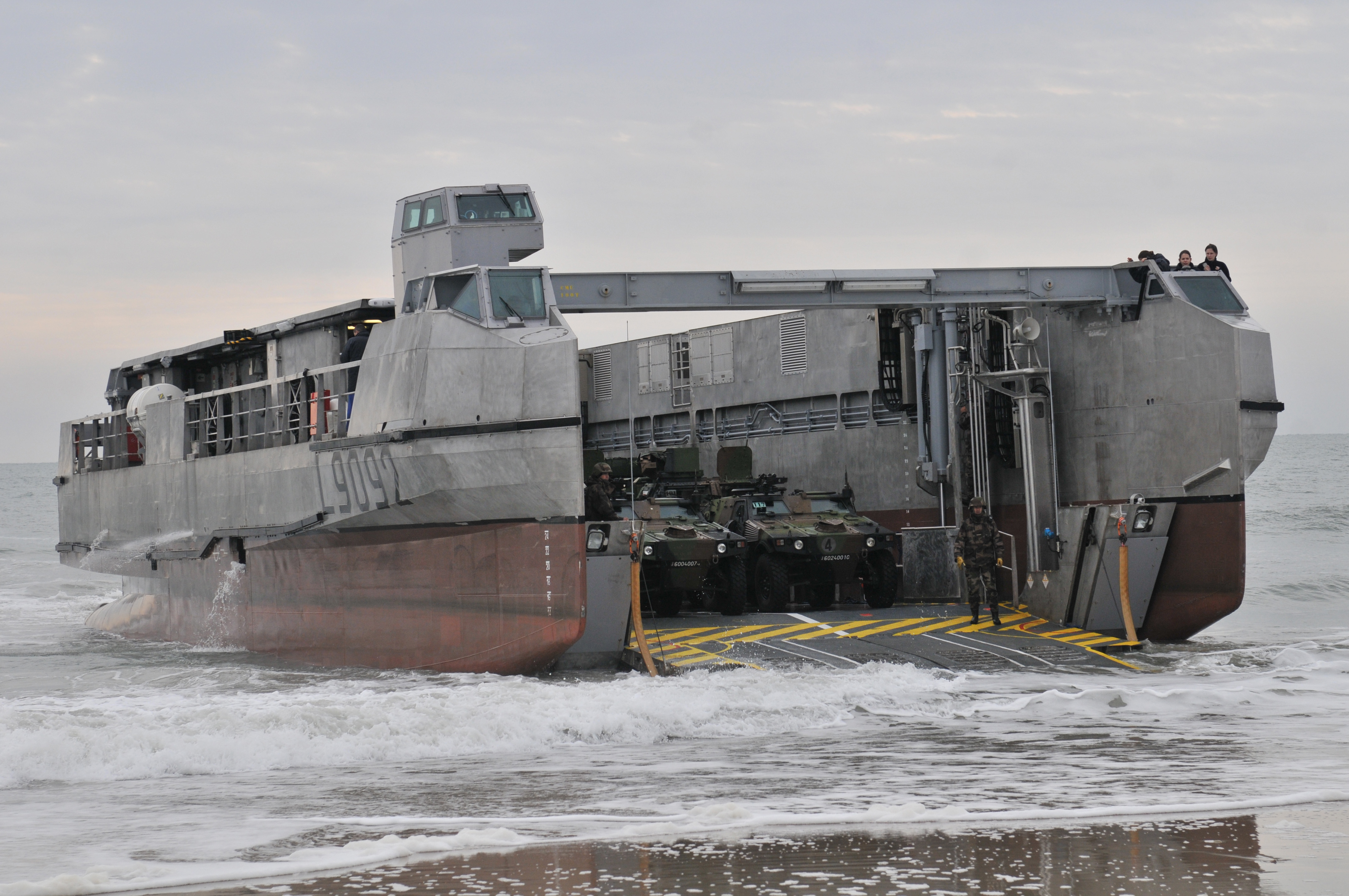
EDA-R landing craft.

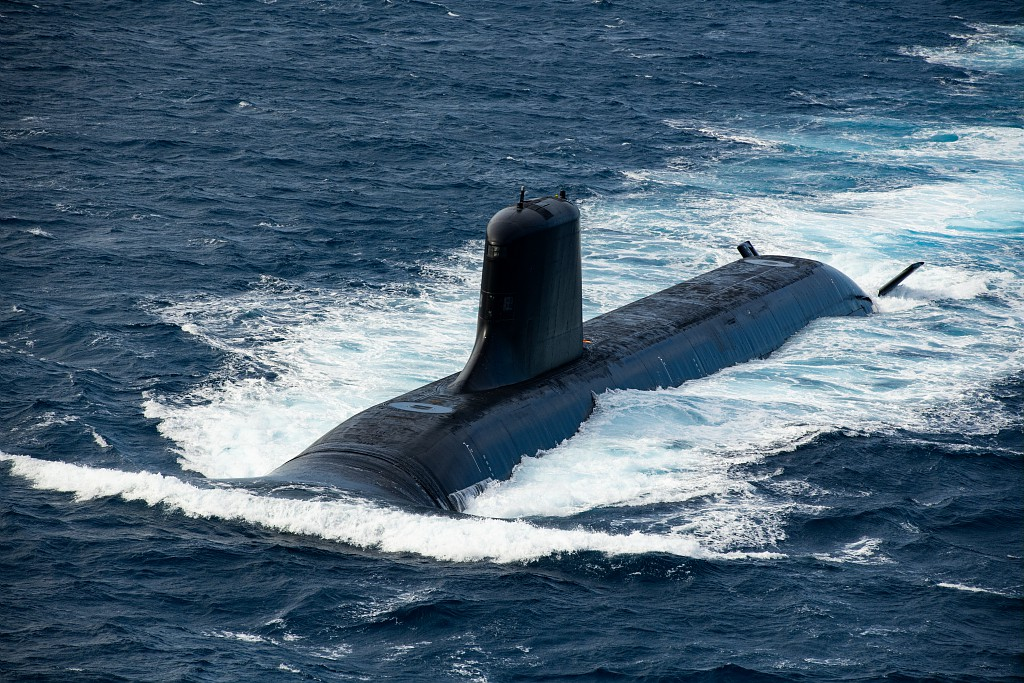
Barracuda-class submarine.

France's financial problems have affected all branches of her military. The 2013 French White Paper on Defence and National Security cancelled the long-planned new aircraft carrier and a possible fourth Mistral-class amphibious assault ship. The backbone of the fleet will be the Aquitaine-class FREMM anti-submarine frigates, replacing the Georges Leygues class, but plans to buy a possible seventeen FREMMs were cut back to eleven and then to eight. The cancellation of the third and fourth Horizon destroyers meant that the last two FREMM hulls, which entered service between 2021 and 2023, are fitted out as FREDA air-defence ships to replace the Cassard class. DCNS has shown a FREMM-ER concept to meet this requirement, emphasising ballistic missile defence with the Thales Sea Fire 500 AESA radar. Industrial considerations mean that the funds for FREMMs 9-11 are now being spent on five more exportable Frégate de Défense et d'Intervention (FDI, "intermediate size frigates") from 2024 to supplement, and ultimately replace, the La Fayette class, three of which are being upgraded with new sonars to operate into the early 2030s. With respect to support ships, the Durance class are being replaced under the FLOTLOG project by up to four derivatives of Italy's Vulcano-class logistic support ship, with three being delivered from 2023 to 2027. A fourth potential ship is delayed until after 2030.

Construction has started on the first of six Barracuda-class nuclear attack submarines; commissioning of Suffren took place in 2020. These nuclear attack submarines are to be followed in the 2030s by the incremental introduction of a new class of nuclear-powered ballistic missile submarines (SSBNs) whose construction began in 2024.

The first MM40 Exocet Block 3 missile was test-fired in 2010 to be produced. Naval versions of the SCALP EG land-attack cruise missile are under development, along with a planned Aster Block 1NT with greater capabilities against ballistic missiles.

In October 2018, the French Ministry of Defence launched an 18-month study for €40 million for the eventual future replacement of the aircraft carrier Charles de Gaulle beyond 2030. A decision to build the new carrier was taken by President Emmanuel Macron in 2020 and once it enters service it is anticipated to remain in service until beyond 2080. Construction of the new carrier is to begin in around 2025 with service entry anticipated in the latter 2030s.

== French naval officers ==
=== Privateers ===
- Lieutenant général des Armées navales du Casse
- Lieutenant général des Armées navales Duguay-Trouin
- Chef d'escadre Jean Bart
- Chef d'escadre Pierre Bouvet
- Cassard
- Surcouf
- Thurot

=== Heroes of the First Republic ===
- Admiral de Latouche-Tréville
- Vice-admiral de Villaret-Joyeuse
- Vice-admiral Bruix
- Rear Admiral du Chayla
- Capitaine de vaisseau du Petit Thouars
- Capitaine de vaisseau Casabianca

=== Explorers ===
- Lieutenant général des Armées navales Bougainville
- Chef d'escadre d'Entrecasteaux
- Chef d'escadre Dumont d'Urville
- Chef de Division Lapérouse
- Captain Samuel de Champlain
- Captain d'Iberville
- Captain Nicolas Baudin
- Captain Louis de Freycinet
- Commander Doudart de Lagrée
- Lieutenant de St Aloüarn
- Lieutenant Francis Garnier
- Lieutenant Savorgnan de Brazza

=== Other important French naval officers ===
- Admiral Florent de Varennes: first admiral of France
- Admiral Jean de Vienne: admiral of the French fleet during the Hundred Years' War
- Admiral Hervé de Portzmoguer: Breton naval commander, renowned for his raids on the English and his death in the Battle of St. Mathieu
- Admiral d'Estaing: admiral of the French fleet which helped the United States secure independence
- Admiral de Grasse: commander of the French fleet at Chesapeake Bay during the American Revolutionary War
- Admiral Courbet: commander of the Far East Squadron
- Vice-Admiral Duquesne: commander of the French fleet at the Battle of Agosta
- Vice-Admiral Jean-Paul de Saumeur, often called Chevalier Paul: served in several Mediterranean campaigns
- Vice-Admiral Tourville: commander of the French fleet at the Battle of Beachy Head
- Vice-Admiral Villeneuve: commander of the French and Spanish fleets at the Battle of Trafalgar
- Lieutenant commander Paul Teste: pioneer of the modern aeronaval operations

=== Notable people who served in the French Navy ===
- Marcel Cerdan: world boxing champion during the 1940s
- Jean Cocteau: poet, novelist, dramatist, designer, playwright, artist and filmmaker
- Jacques-Yves Cousteau
- Jean Cras: composer
- Philippe de Gaulle: son of the general Charles de Gaulle
- Alain Delon: actor, served as a fusilier marin in the First Indochina War
- Bob Denard: mercenary notorious for coup attempts and wars in Africa
- Jean Gabin: actor, joined the Free French naval force during the Second World War
- Paul Gauguin: painter, sculptor, print-maker, ceramist, and writer
- Bernard Giraudeau: actor, film director, scriptwriter, producer and writer
- André Marty: leading figure in the French Communist Party from 1923 to 1955
- Albert II, Prince of Monaco: reserve Lieutenant Commander
- Pierre Loti: mostly known for his literary works
- Albert Roussel: composer
- Victor Segalen: ethnographer, archaeologist, writer, poet, explorer, art-theorist, linguist and literary critic
- Michel Serres: philosopher and author
- Eugène Sue: novelist
- Eric Tabarly: yachtsman
- Paul Emile Victor: ethnologist and polar explorer

== Gallery ==
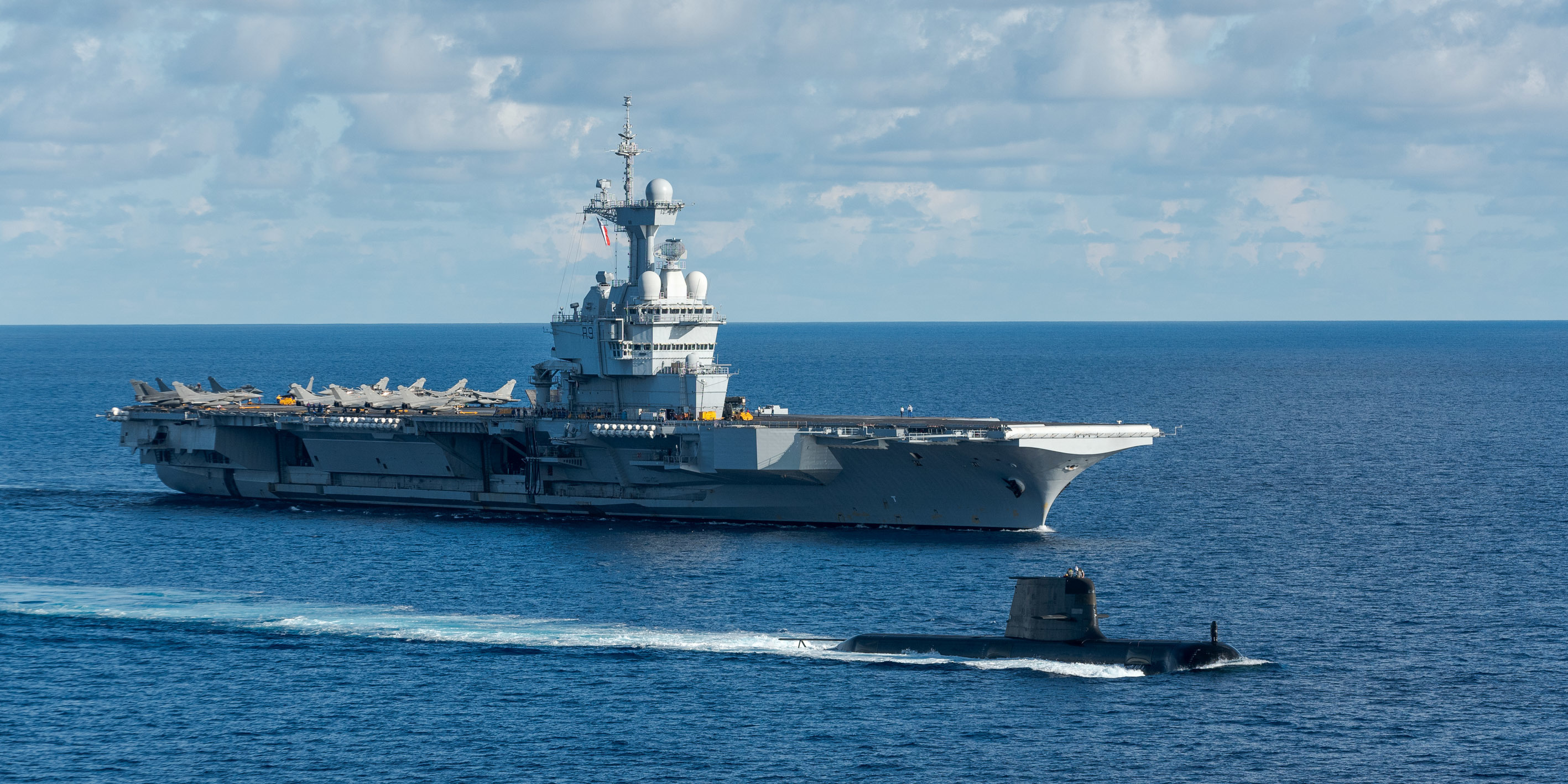
Charles de Gaulle (R91) nuclear-powered aircraft carrier

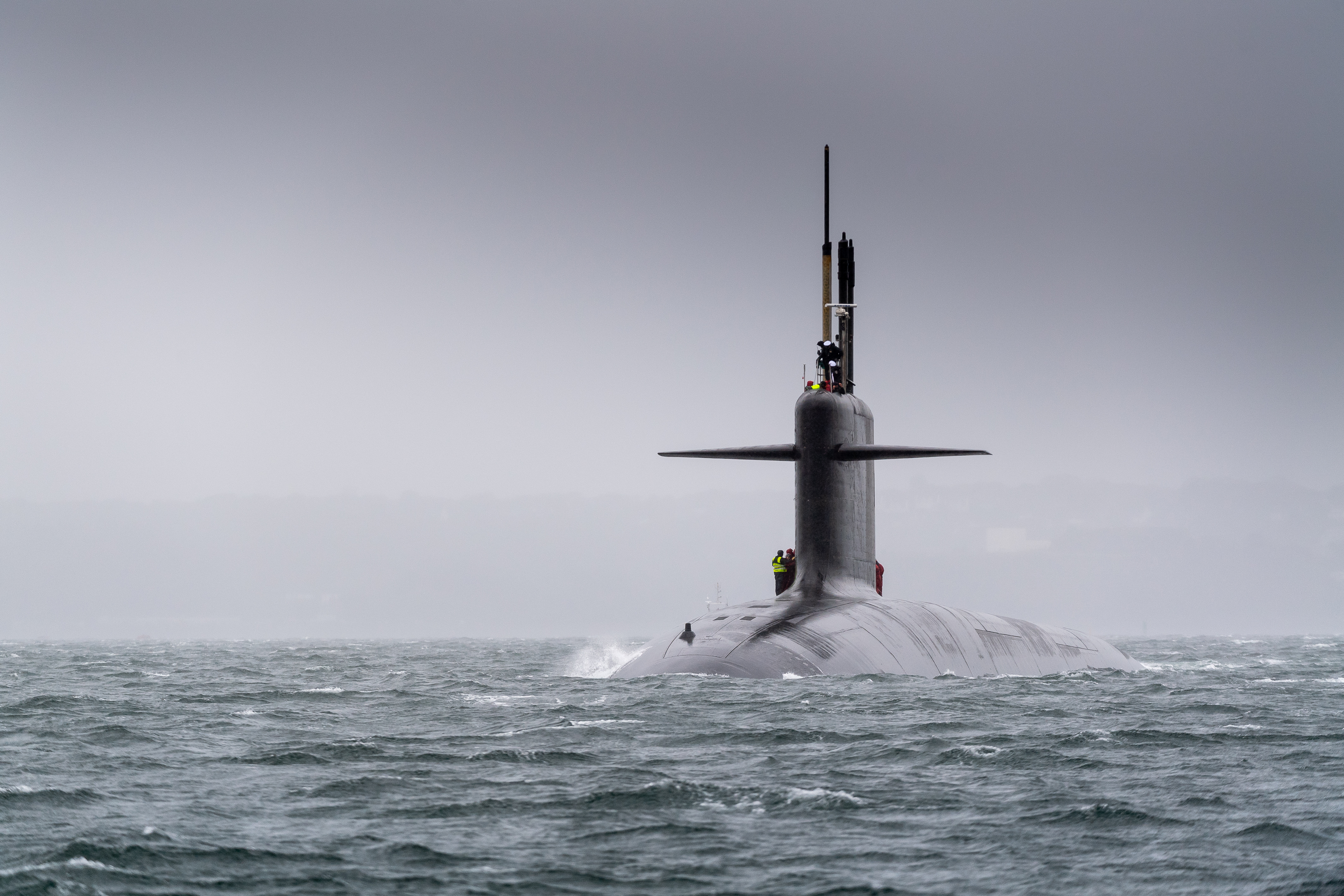
Triomphant-class nuclear ballistic missile submarine

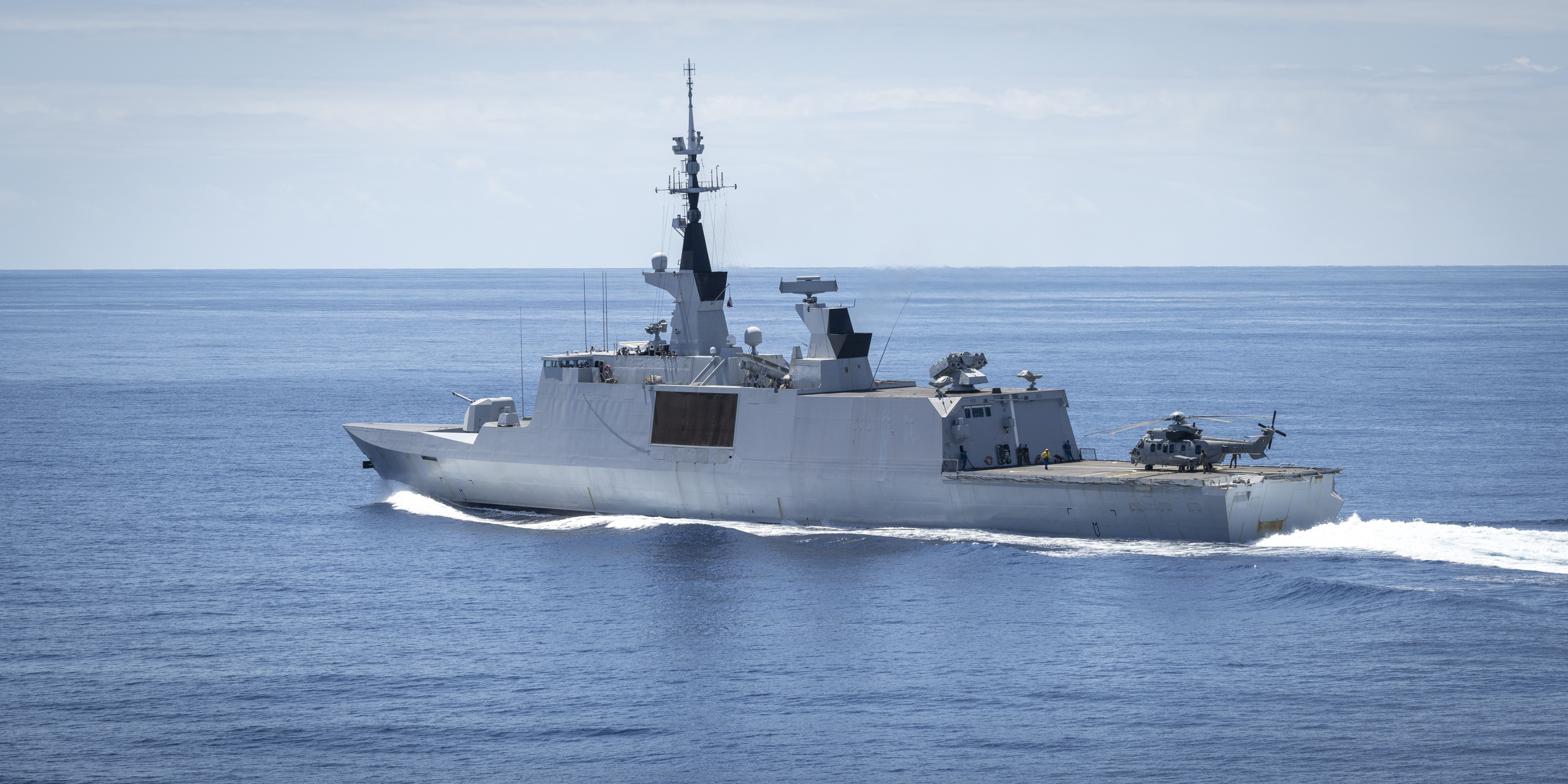
La Fayette-class frigate

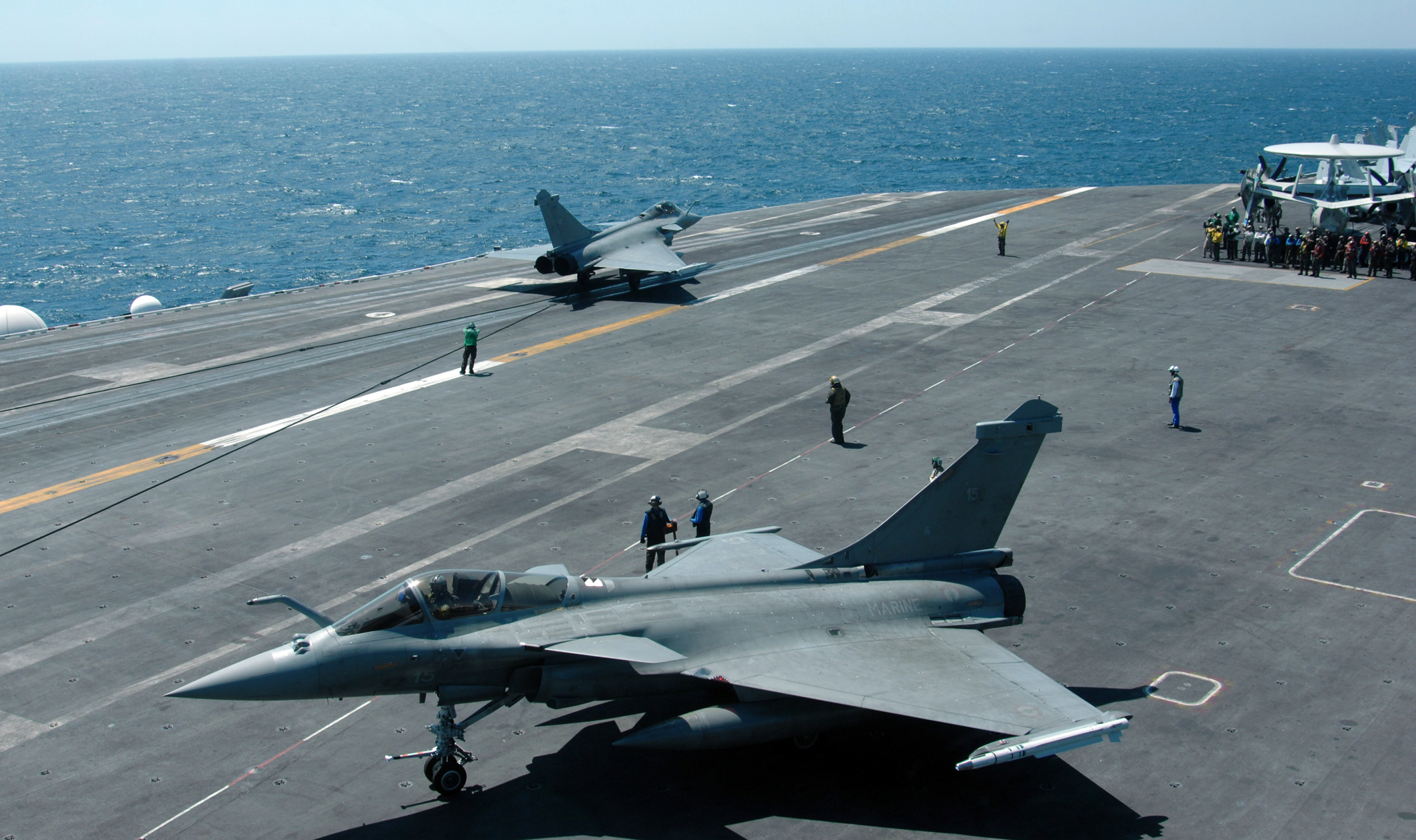
Rafale multirole fighter of the French Naval Aviation

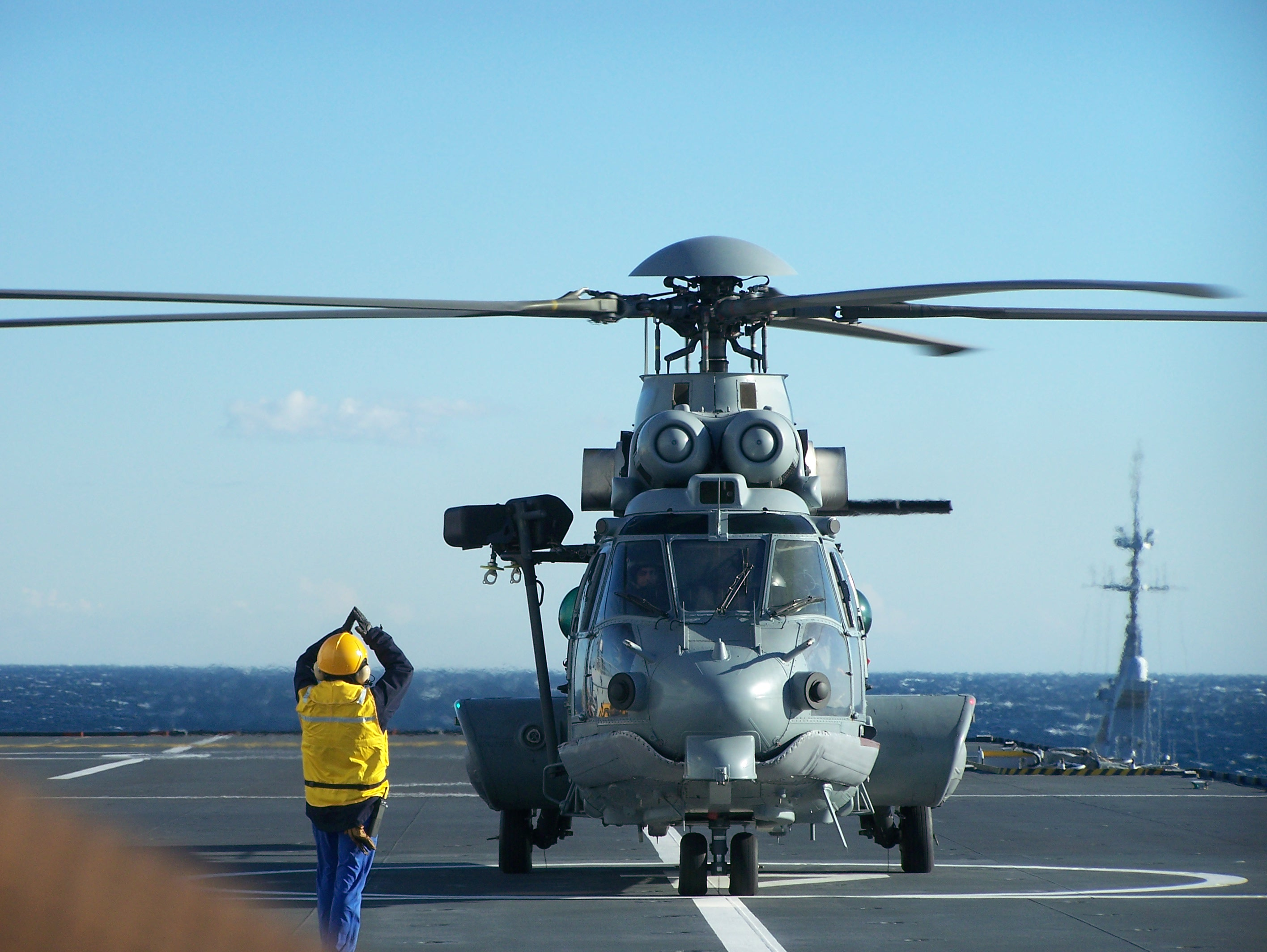
Caracal military transport helicopter

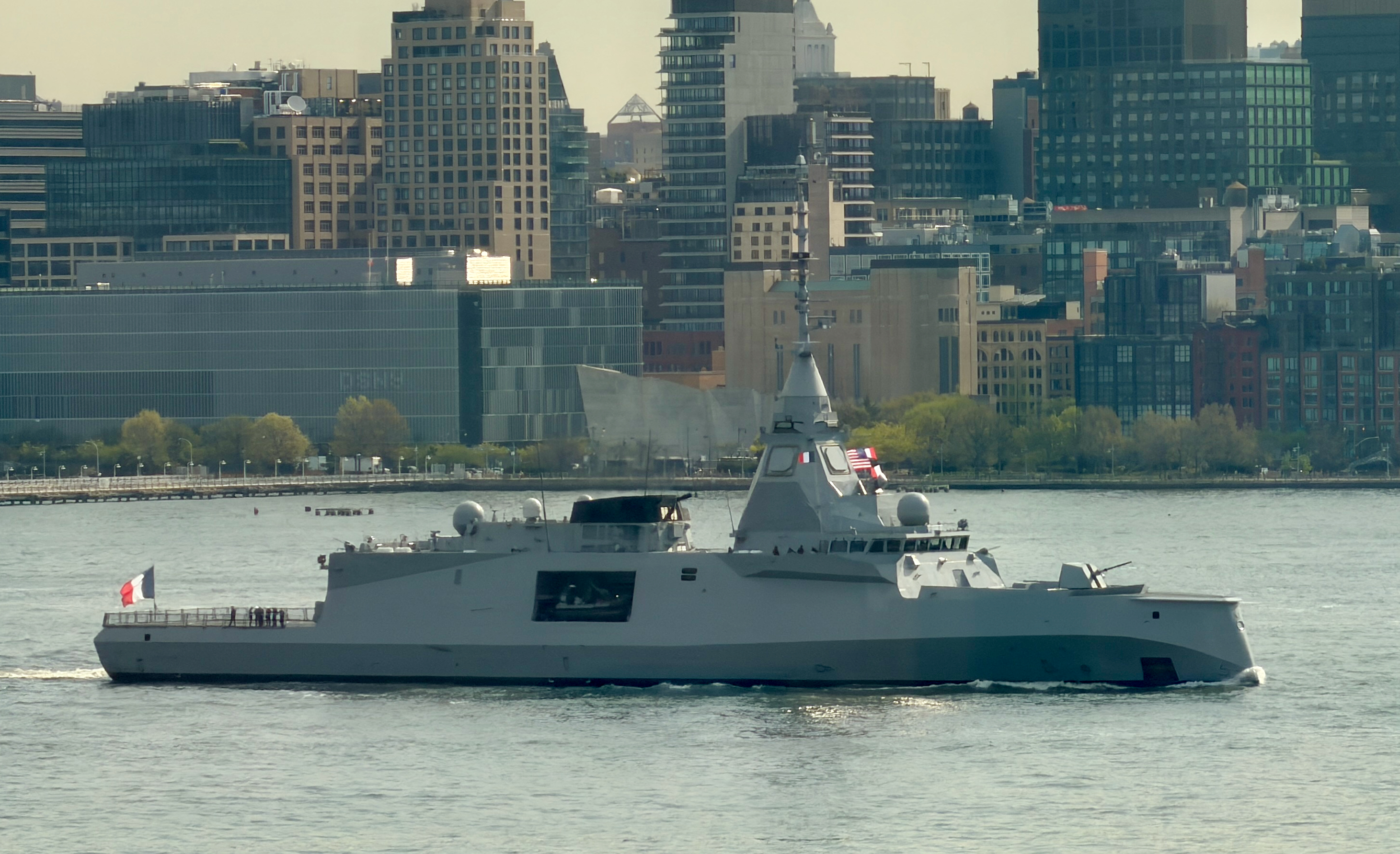
Amiral Ronarc'h-class frigate

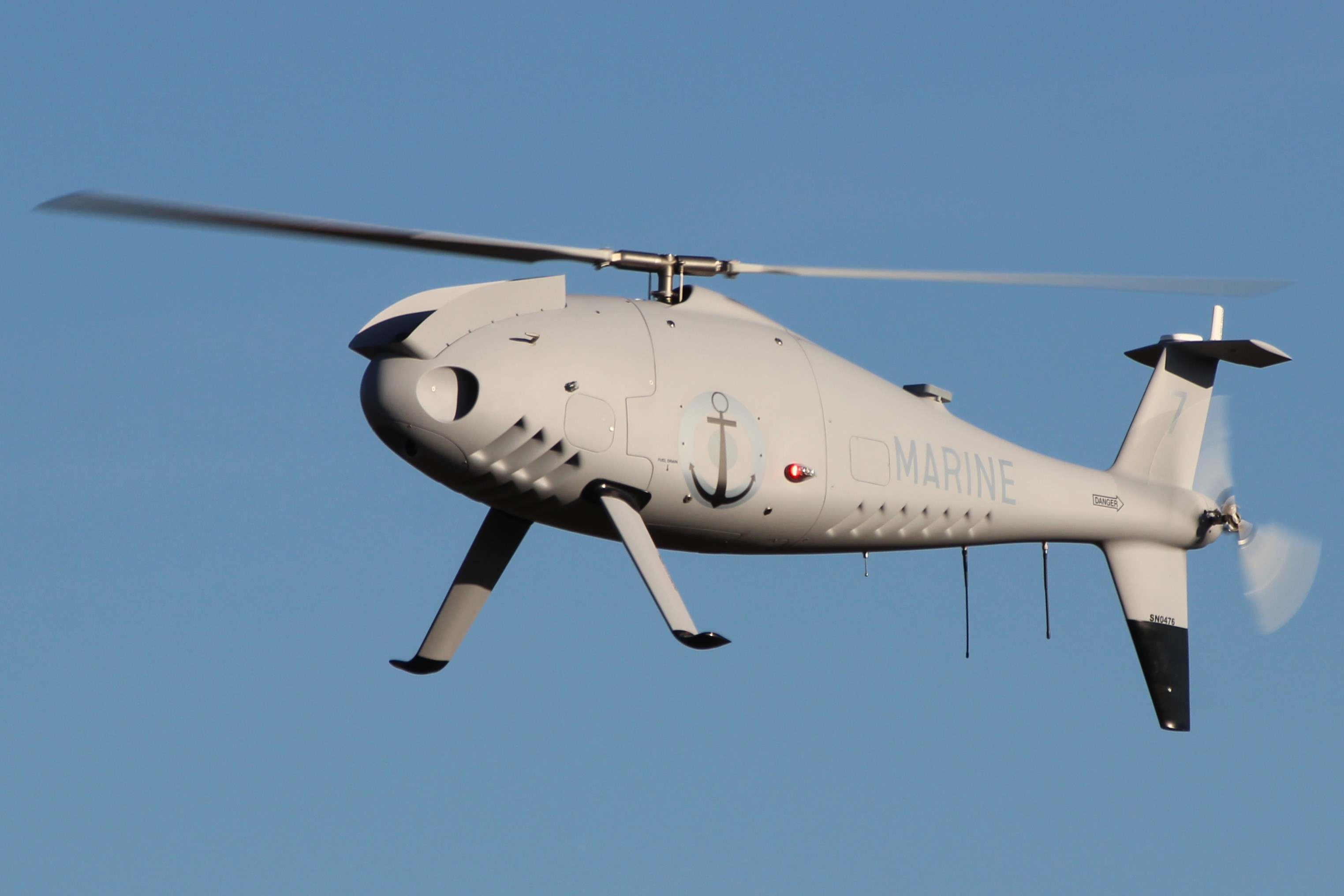
Schiebel Camcopter S-100 unmanned aerial vehicle

== See also ==
- History of the French Navy from 1715 to 1789
- List of active French Navy ships
- List of French Navy ship names
- Future of the French Navy

=== Marine nationale ===
- Chief of Staff of the French Navy
- Airborne Units of the French Navy
- Escorteur
- Far East Squadron
- French 100 mm naval gun
- List of aircraft carriers of France
- List of escorteurs of France
- List of French naval battles
- List of Naval Ministers of France
- Standing French Navy Deployments
- Category:French Navy admirals
- Category:French Navy officers
- Category:Naval ships of France
