= Standing French Navy Deployments =

List of current deployments by the French Navy

Naval ensign of France

Standing French Navy Deployments is a list of current deployments by the French Navy:

== Maritime zones ==
The French Navy maintains a continual naval presence in the maritime zones of its overseas departments and territories. Each maritime zone is host to either a naval base or naval facility to support the various ships deployed in these regions.

- North Sea and English Channel Maritime zone
- Atlantic Ocean Maritime zone
- Caribbean Sea Maritime Zone
- Guiana Maritime Zone
- Green Cape Maritime Zone
- Mediterranean Sea Maritime Zone
- Indian Ocean Maritime Zone
  - Southern Indian Ocean Maritime Zone
- Pacific Ocean Maritime Zone
  - French Polynesia Maritime Zone
  - New Caledonia Maritime Zone

== See also ==
- Blue-water navy
- Standing Royal Navy deployments
- Historic French Navy Deployments
