= List of French naval battles =

The following is an incomplete list of famous French naval battles from the Middle Ages to modern France.

Name	Start date	End date	Allies	Enemies	Result	Part of
Battle of Sluys	1340-06-24	1340-06-24		Kingdom of England	Defeat	Hundred Years' War
Battle of Saint-Mathieu	1512-08-10	1512-08-10		Kingdom of England	Defeat	War of the League of Cambrai
Battle of the Solent	1545-07-18	1545-07-19		Kingdom of England	Inconclusive	Italian War of 1542–1546
Battle of Bantry Bay	1689-05-11	1689-05-11		England	Victory	Nine Years' War
Battle of Beachy Head	1690-07-10	1690-07-10		England; Dutch Republic	Victory	Nine Years' War
Battles of Barfleur and La Hougue	1692-05-29	1692-06-04		England; Dutch Republic	Defeat	Nine Years' War
Action at Barfleur	1692-05-29	1692-05-29		England; Dutch Republic	Inconclusive	Battles of Barfleur and La Hougue (Nine Years' War)
Action at Cherbourg	1692-06-01	1692-06-02		England; Dutch Republic	Defeat	Battles of Barfleur and La Hougue (Nine Years' War)
Action at La Hogue	1692-06-01	1692-06-04		England; Dutch Republic	Defeat	Battles of Barfleur and La Hougue (Nine Years' War)
Battle of Lagos (1693)	1693-06-27	1693-06-27		England; Dutch Republic	Victory	Nine Years' War
Battle of Texel	1694-06-29	1694-06-29		Dutch Republic	Victory	Nine Years' War
Battle of Dogger Bank	1696-06-17	1696-06-17		Dutch Republic	Victory	Nine Years' War
Battle of Sainte Marthe	1702-08-19	1702-08-25		England	Inconclusive	War of the Spanish Succession
Battle of Vigo Bay	1702-10-23	1702-10-23	Kingdom of Spain	England; Dutch Republic	Defeat	War of the Spanish Succession
Battle of Málaga	1704-08-24	1704-08-24	Kingdom of Spain	England; Dutch Republic	Inconclusive	War of the Spanish Succession
Action of 2 May 1707	1707-02-05	1707-03-06		Great Britain	Victory	War of the Spanish Succession
Battle at The Lizard	1707-21-10	1707-21-10		Great Britain	Victory	War of the Spanish Succession
Battle of Rio de Janeiro	1711-12-09	1711-22-09		(Portugal) Portuguese Empire: State of Brazil	Victory	War of the Spanish Succession
Battle of Toulon	1744-21-02	1744-22-02	Spain	Great Britain	Indecisive	War of the Austrian Succession
Battle of Minorca	1756-20-05	1756-20-05		Great Britain	Victory	Seven Years' War
Battle of Cuddalore (1758)	1758-29-04	1758-29-04		British East India Company	Indecisive	Seven Years' War
Battle of Pondicherry	1759-10-09	1759-10-09		Great Britain	Indecisive	Seven Years' War
Battle of Lagos (1759)	1759-08-18	1759-08-19		Great Britain	Defeat	Seven Years' War (1759 Invasion Campaign)
Battle of Quiberon Bay	1759-11-20	1759-11-20		Great Britain	Defeat	Seven Years' War (1759 Invasion Campaign)
Battle of Ushant	1778-27-07	1778-27-07		Great Britain	Indecisive	American Revolutionary War
Battle of Grenada	1779-07-06	1779-07-06		Great Britain	Victory	American Revolutionary War (West Indies)
Battle of the Chesapeake	1781-09-05	1781-09-05		Great Britain	Victory	American Revolutionary War (Yorktown campaign)
Battle of Sadras	1782-17-02	1782-17-02		Great Britain	Indecisive	American Revolutionary War
Battle of the Saintes	1782-04-09	1782-04-12		Great Britain	Defeat	American Revolutionary War
Glorious First of June	1794-06-01	1794-06-01		Great Britain	Defeat	War of the First Coalition
Battle of Genoa	1795-03-13	1795-03-14		Great Britain; Kingdom of Naples	Defeat	War of the First Coalition
Battle of Groix	1795-06-23	1795-06-23		Great Britain	Defeat	War of the First Coalition
Battle of the Hyères Islands	1795-07-13	1795-07-13		Great Britain; Kingdom of Naples	Defeat	War of the First Coalition
Battle of the Nile	1798-08-01	1798-08-03		Great Britain	Defeat	Mediterranean campaign of 1798 of the French Revolutionary Wars
Second Battle of Algeciras	1801-07-12	1801-07-13	Kingdom of Spain	United Kingdom; Kingdom of Portugal	Defeat	Anglo-Spanish War (1796–1808) & War of the Second Coalition of French Revolutionary Wars
Battle of Cape Finisterre	1805-07-22	1805-07-22	Kingdom of Spain	United Kingdom	Indecisive	Anglo-Spanish War (1796–1808) & Trafalgar campaign of War of the Third Coalition
Action of 10 August 1805	1805-08-10	1805-08-10		United Kingdom	Defeat	Trafalgar campaign of War of the Third Coalition
Battle of Trafalgar	1805-10-21	1805-10-21	Kingdom of Spain	United Kingdom	Defeat	Anglo-Spanish War (1796–1808) & Trafalgar campaign of War of the Third Coalition
Battle of Cape Ortegal	1805-11-04	1805-11-04		United Kingdom	Defeat	Trafalgar campaign of War of the Third Coalition
Battle of San Domingo	1806-02-06	1806-02-06		United Kingdom	Defeat	War of the Third Coalition & West Indies Campaign of Napoleonic Wars
Capture of the Rosily Squadron	1808-06-09	1808-06-14		Kingdom of Spain	Defeat	Peninsular War
Battle of the Basque Roads	1809-04-11	1809-04-24		United Kingdom	Defeat	War of the Fifth Coalition
Battle of Grand Port	1810-08-20	1810-08-27		United Kingdom	Victory	Mauritius campaign of Napoleonic Wars
Battle of Fuzhou	1884-08-23	1884-08-26		(Qing dynasty) China	Victory	Sino-French War
Battle of Ko Chang	1941-01-17	1941-01-17		Thailand	Victory	Franco-Thai War
