= French frigate Nivôse =

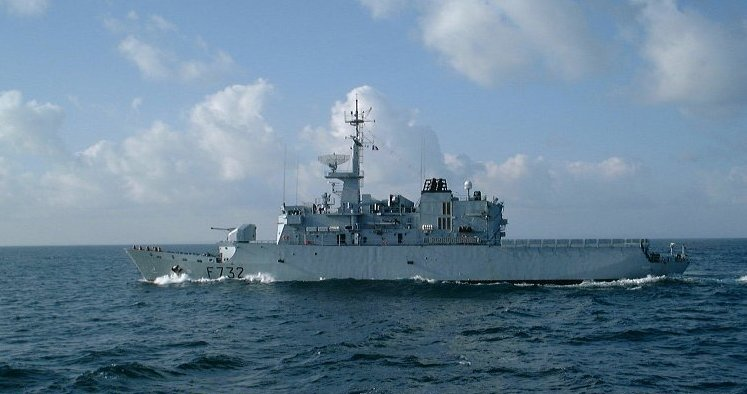
- Frigate Nivôse

History

France
- Name: Nivôse
- Namesake: Month of Nivôse
- Ordered: 9 January 1990
- Builder: Chantiers de l'Atlantique
- Laid down: 16 January 1991
- Launched: 10 August 1991
- Commissioned: 16 October 1992
- Home port: Port des Galets, Réunion
- Status: In service

General characteristics
- Class & type: Floréal-class frigate
- Displacement: 2,600 t (2,600 long tons); 3,000 t (2,950 long tons) full load
- Length: 93.5 m (306 ft 9 in)
- Beam: 14 m (45 ft 11 in)
- Draught: 4.3 m (14 ft 1 in)
- Propulsion: 4 × SEMT Pielstick 6 PA6 L280 BPC diesel engines; 6,580 kW (8,820 hp); 2 shafts, 1 × 203 kW (272 hp) bow thruster
- Speed: 20 knots (37 km/h; 23 mph)
- Range: 9,000 nmi (17,000 km; 10,000 mi) at 15 knots (28 km/h; 17 mph)
- Troops: 24 marines
- Complement: 90
- Sensors & processing systems: DRBV-21C (Mars) air sentry radar; Racal Decca RM1290 navigation radar; Racal Decca RM1290 landing radar
- Electronic warfare & decoys: ARBG-1A Saïgon; 2 Dagaie decoy systems
- Armament: 2 Exocet MM38 missiles (removed); 1 × 100 mm CADAM turret with Najir fire control system; 2 × 20 mm modèle F2 guns; 2 x 2 Manually-operated SIMBAD/Mistral point defence SAM
- Aircraft carried: 1 × Eurocopter Panther helicopter
- Aviation facilities: Flight deck and hangar

Nivôse is a Floréal-class frigate (French: frégate de surveillance) of the French Navy. The frigate is the third ship of the class and the fourth French vessel named after the fourth month of the Republican Calendar. Nivôse was constructed by Chantiers de l'Atlantique at Saint-Nazaire, France, in 1991 and entered service in 1992. The frigate is stationed at Réunion in the Indian Ocean for patrol duties.

== Design and description ==
The Floréal-class frigates were designed in response to a demand for a cheap warship capable of operating in low threat areas and able to perform general patrol functions. As a result, the Floréal class were constructed to mercantile standards in the areas of ammunition stowage, helicopter facilities and damage control, which significantly lowered the cost of the vessels. The Floréal class were designed for using modular construction which shortened their building times.

Nivôse has a standard displacement of 2,600 tonnes (2,600 long tons) and 3,000 tonnes (2,950 long tons) at full load. The frigate measures 85.2 metres (279 ft 6 in) long between perpendiculars and 93.5 metres (306 ft 9 in) overall with a beam of 14 metres (45 ft 11 in) and a draught of 4.3 m (14 ft 1 in). Due to the frigate's broad beam, the ship is equipped with fin stabilisers.

The frigate is powered by a combined diesel and diesel (CODAD) system comprising four SEMT Pielstick 6 PA6 L280 BPC diesel engines driving two shafts each turning a LIPS controllable pitch propeller. The CODAD system is rated at 6,580 kilowatts (8,820 hp) The vessel is also equipped with one 203-kilowatt (272 hp) bow thruster. Due to the mercantile construction design, the four diesels are all located within one machinery room for ease of maintenance. Both diesel fuel and TR5 aviation fuel is brought aboard at a single location at the stern compared to naval-constructed vessels which sport two. The ship also has three 750 kW (1,010 hp) diesel-electric generators located just fore and aft of the machinery room. Nivôse has a maximum speed of 20 knots (37 km/h; 23 mph) and a range of 9,000 nautical miles (17,000 km; 10,000 mi) at 15 knots (28 km/h; 17 mph).

Nivôse was armed with two Exocet MM38 surface-to-surface missiles in launchers situated centrally atop the midships superstructure. However, at the end of the missile's life cycle in 2014, the launchers were removed as the French Navy did not intend to replace the capability aboard the ships. The ship also mounts one 100 mm CADAM turret with the Najir fire control system located forwards and two 20 mm modèle F2 guns situated in atop the aft superstructure. The ship is equipped with DRBV-21C (Mars) air sentry, Racal Decca RM1290 navigation and Racal Decca RM1290 landing radars along with ARBG-1A Saïgon communications intercept, CSF ARBR 16A radar intercept electronic surveillance systems and two Dagaie decoy systems.

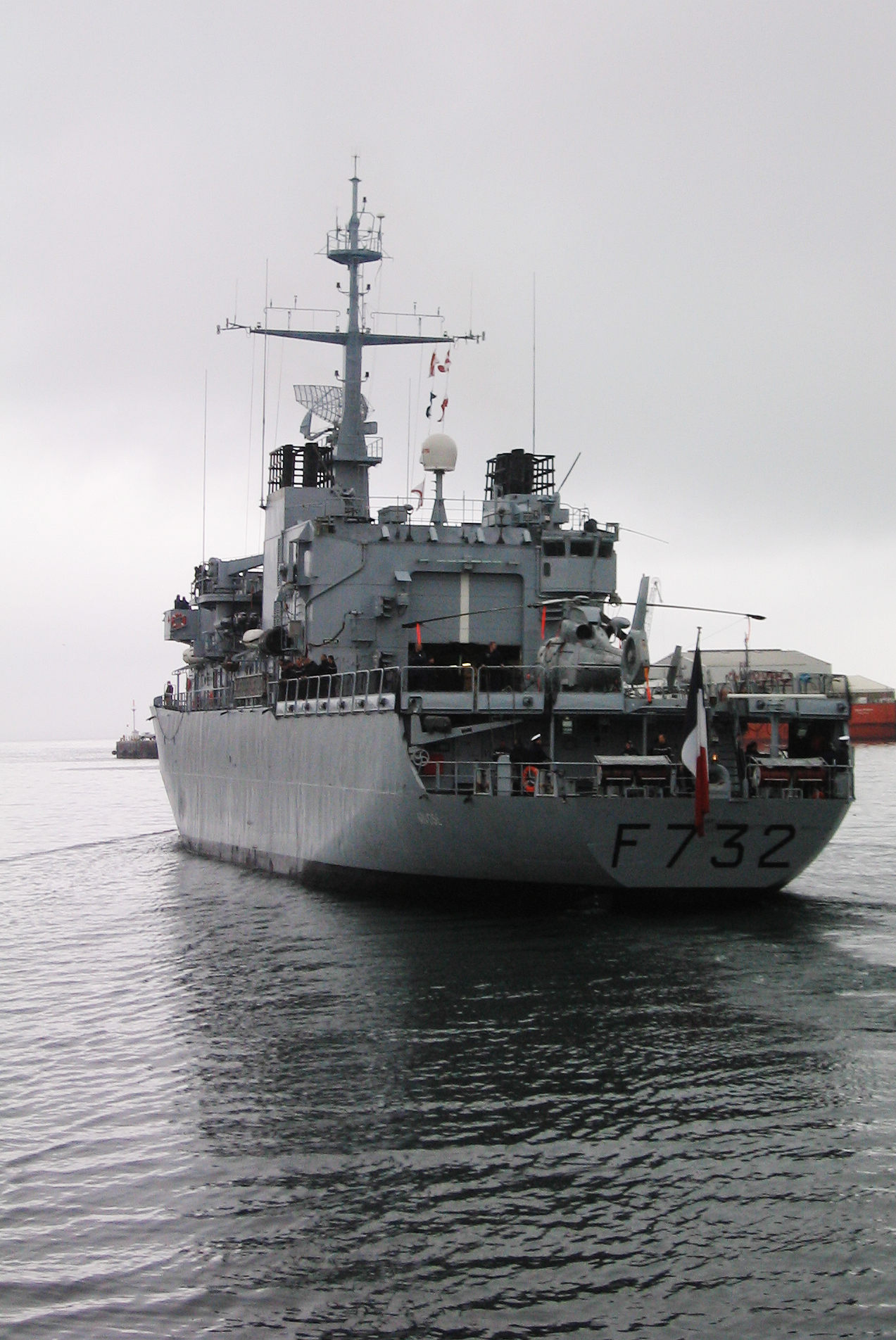
Stern of Nivôse showing her Panther helicopter

The frigate is equipped with a 30-by-15-metre (98 by 49 ft) helicopter landing pad located on the stern and a 10-by-15-metre (33 by 49 ft) hangar. The ship is capable of operating the embarked Eurocopter AS565 Panther or Dauphin N3 up to sea state 5. Nivôse is capable of operating helicopters up to the size of the Eurocopter AS332 Super Puma. Based out of Réunion, she most commonly operates the AS565 Panther. The ship has a complement of 90 including the aircrew and officers and 24 marines with capacity for a further 13 personnel.

== Construction and career ==
Nivôse was ordered as part of the second pair on 9 January 1990 from Chantiers de l'Atlantique for construction at their yard in Saint-Nazaire, France, and the keel was laid down on 16 January 1991. The frigate was built using modular construction methods which reduced the vessel's construction time. Nivôse was launched on 10 August 1991 and commissioned into the French Navy on 16 October 1992. Following sea trials, Nivôse sailed for Arsenal de Lorient, Lorient where the weapons and sensors were installed and underwent further trials.

After entering service, Nivôse was based at Port des Galets, Réunion to patrol France's Pacific territories. In December 2000, the frigate caught the fishing vessel Vedra illegally fishing south east of Kerguelen. After taking control of Vedra and heading for Port des Galets, the two ships came upon another vessel, Grand Prince, illegally fishing. Grand Prince was halted and boarded and all three vessels sailed for Réunion. On 27 July 2001, while sailing off the coast of Somalia, Nivôse received a distress call from Diana, which was afire. The crew of Diana had abandoned ship and were in the water in heavy seas. The frigate dispatched its helicopter and the 16 crew were rescued of which 15 were transported to the cargo ship Maersk San Jose. The sixteenth crew member was taken to Nivôse to receive medical treatment. In October 2001, Nivôse was deployed in the Persian Gulf as part of Operation Enduring Freedom.

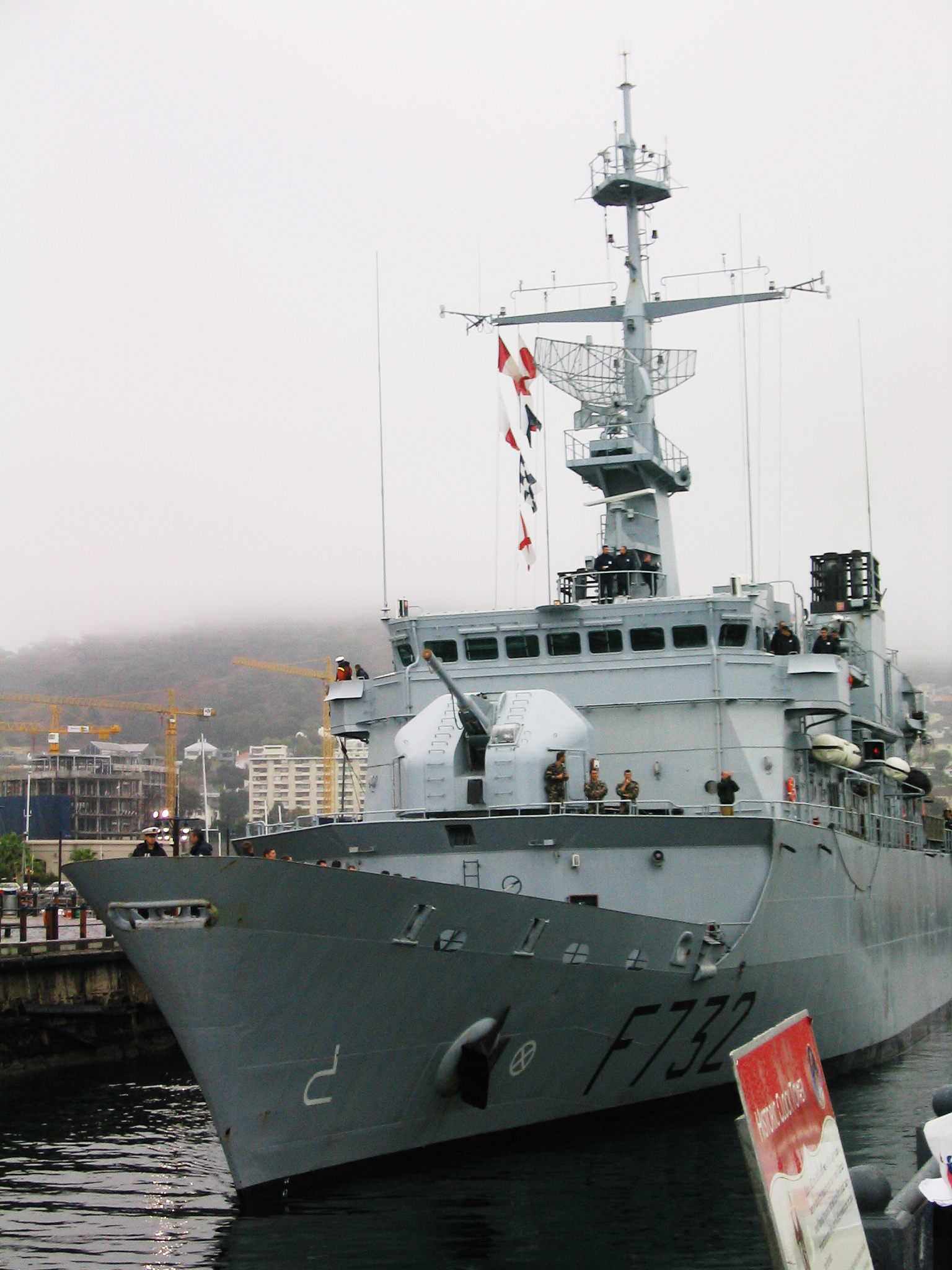
Nivôse departing Cape Town, South Africa

In January 2003, Nivôse intercepted and captured the fishing vessel Lince off the Kerguelen coast after it was spotted illegally fishing for toothfish. Lince, a vessel known for illegal fishing, was found to have 160 tonnes (160 long tons; 180 short tons) of toothfish aboard and was taken to Port des Galets under escort by both Nivôse and the patrol vessel La Boudeuse. In March 2004, the frigate was deployed in support of Madagascar after Typhoon Galifo hit the island nation. Later that year in September, Nivôse with the patrol vessel La Rieuse, intercepted a flotilla of six Japanese fishing vessels illegally fishing in French waters. Two Japanese ships were boarded, Koryu Maru 38 and Chokyu Maru 38, and 150 tonnes (150 long tons; 170 short tons) of illegally caught tuna was found in their holds. The two fishing vessels were escorted into Port des Galets. In November 2004, the frigate intercepted the Taiwanese fishing vessel Ruey Shyang 11 after it was spotted illegally fishing 210 kilometres (130 mi) southwest of Réunion. In 2006, the frigate underwent a three-month long maintenance period at Dubai.

In late 2008, under frigate captain French: capitaine de frégate Jean-Marc Le Quilliec, Nivôse was deployed as part of a European Union expeditionary force, Operation Atalanta, in the Gulf of Aden to fight piracy off Somalia. On 12 April 2009, Nivôse relieved her sister ship Floréal as part the operation. On 15 April 2009, she captured eleven pirates 900 km (560 mi) east of Mombasa, and thwarted an attack on the Liberian-registered merchantman Safmarine Asia. On 3 May 2009, 900 km off Somalia, the crew managed to lure pirates to attack the ship by sailing into the sun to avoid being identified and mistaken for a merchant vessel; as the pirates closed in, Nivôse turned about and launched a helicopter and fast outboard vessels. Eleven pirates were captured. From 5 to 7 March 2010, joining mission forces from France, Italy, Luxembourg, Spain and Sweden, Nivôse intercepted four mother ships and arrested 35 pirates in three days off Somalia. The frigate sank two of the mother ships.

On 29 March 2014, Nivôse intercepted five fishing vessels illegally fishing off Juan de Nova Island. During the night of 29/30 September 2014, Nivôse was severely damaged by a fire off Réunion which broke out in the engine room. Floréal assisted in firefighting operations. The ship was disabled and Nivôse was towed first by Floréal and then by the tugboat Bougainville into Port des Galets. The frigate was taken to Mauritius to undergo repairs. The ship returned to service after nearly 13 months in November 2015.

In March 2019, the frigate and the amphibious assault ship Tonnerre were sent to Mozambique as part of France's response for humanitarian aid after Typhoon Idai hit the nation. On 25 September 2019, Nivôse intercepted a dhow in the Indian Ocean. During the search of the vessel, 2.5 tonnes (2.5 long tons; 2.8 short tons) of cannabis resin was found and seized.

On 6 December 2020, the frigate rendezvoused with the sailing vessel Yes We Cam! during the Vendée Globe 2020–2021 in order to transfer a sailor whose yacht had broken up during the race.

From October to December 2022, Nivôse conducted a two-month patrol in the region, including carrying out sovereignty protection operations around Mayotte and operating in conjunction with the La Fayette-class frigate Aconit in anti-drug trafficking operations.
