= French frigate Prairial =

French naval vessel

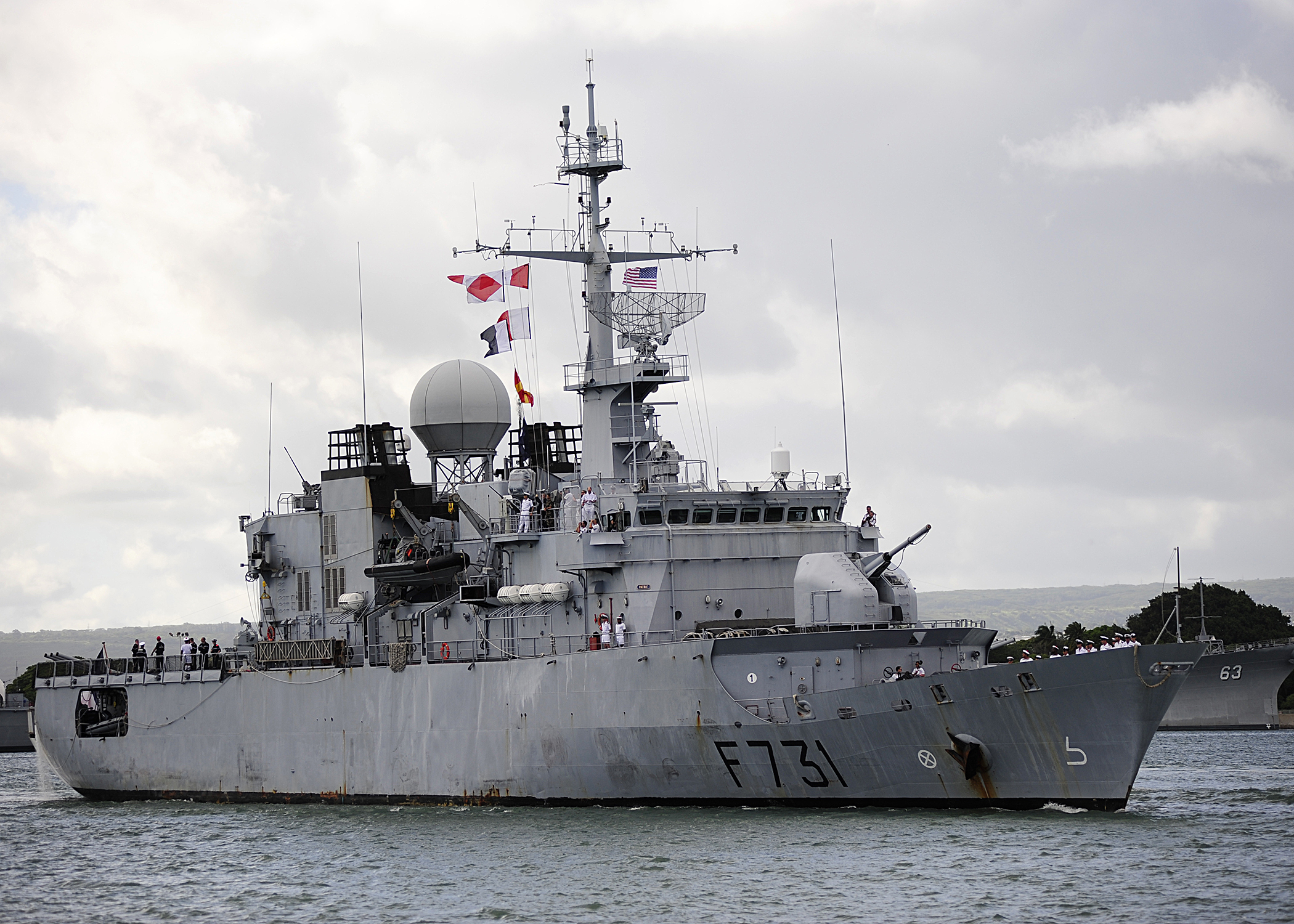
- Frigate Prairial

History

France
- Name: Prairial
- Namesake: Month of Prairial
- Ordered: 20 January 1989
- Builder: Chantiers de l'Atlantique
- Laid down: 11 September 1990
- Launched: 16 March 1991
- Commissioned: 20 May 1992
- Home port: Tahiti
- Status: Active

General characteristics
- Class & type: Floréal-class frigate
- Displacement: 2,600 t (2,600 long tons); 3,000 t (2,950 long tons) full load
- Length: 93.5 m (306 ft 9 in)
- Beam: 14 m (45 ft 11 in)
- Draught: 4.3 m (14 ft 1 in)
- Propulsion: 4 × SEMT Pielstick 6 PA6 L280 BPC diesel engines; 6,580 kW (8,820 hp); 2 shafts, 1 × 203 kW (272 hp) bow thruster
- Speed: 20 knots (37 km/h; 23 mph)
- Range: 9,000 nmi (17,000 km; 10,000 mi) at 15 knots (28 km/h; 17 mph)
- Troops: 24 marines
- Complement: 90
- Sensors & processing systems: DRBV-21C (Mars) air sentry radar; Racal Decca RM1290 navigation radar; Racal Decca RM1290 landing radar
- Electronic warfare & decoys: ARBG-1A Saïgon; 2 Dagaie decoy systems
- Armament: 2 Exocet MM38 missiles (removed); 1 × 100 mm CADAM turret with Najir fire control system; 2 × 20 mm modèle F2 guns; 2 x 2 Manually-operated SIMBAD/Mistral point defence SAM
- Aircraft carried: 1 Eurocopter Dauphin N3 (replaced Aérospatiale Alouette III in 2022 when the latter retired)
- Aviation facilities: Flight deck and hangar

Prairial is a Floréal-class frigate (French: frégate de surveillance) of the French Navy. She is the second ship of the class, and the second French warship named after the ninth month of the Republican Calendar. The ship was constructed by Chantiers de l'Atlantique at Saint-Nazaire, France, in 1992 and entered service in 1993. Prairial is stationed in the French Pacific territories for patrol duties.

== Design and description ==
The Floréal-class frigates were designed in response to a demand for a cheap warship capable of operating in low threat areas and able to perform general patrol functions. As a result, the Floréal class were constructed to mercantile standards in the areas of ammunition stowage, helicopter facilities and damage control, which significantly lowered the cost of the vessels. The Floréal class were designed for using modular construction which shortened their building times.

Prairial has a standard displacement of 2,600 tonnes (2,600 long tons) and 3,000 tonnes (2,950 long tons) at full load. The frigate measures 85.2 metres (279 ft 6 in) long between perpendiculars and 93.5 metres (306 ft 9 in) overall with a beam of 14 metres (45 ft 11 in) and a draught of 4.3 m (14 ft 1 in). Due to the frigate's broad beam, the ship is equipped with fin stabilisers.

The frigate is powered by a combined diesel and diesel (CODAD) system comprising four SEMT Pielstick 6 PA6 L280 BPC diesel engines driving two shafts each turning a LIPS controllable pitch propeller. The CODAD system is rated at 6,580 kilowatts (8,820 hp) The vessel is also equipped with one 203-kilowatt (272 hp) bow thruster. Due to the mercantile construction design, the four diesels are all located within one machinery room for ease of maintenance. Both diesel fuel and TR5 aviation fuel is brought aboard at a single location at the stern compared to naval-constructed vessels which sport two. The ship also has three 750 kW (1,010 hp) diesel-electrical generators located just fore and aft of the machinery room. Prairial has a maximum speed of 20 knots (37 km/h; 23 mph) and a range of 9,000 nautical miles (17,000 km; 10,000 mi) at 15 knots (28 km/h; 17 mph).

Prairial was armed with two Exocet MM38 surface-to-surface missiles in launchers situated centrally atop the midships superstructure. However, at the end of the missile's life cycle in 2014, the launchers were removed as the French Navy did not intend to replace the capability aboard the ships. The ship also mounts one 100 mm CADAM turret with the Najir fire control system located forwards and two 20 mm modèle F2 guns situated in atop the aft superstructure. The ship is equipped with DRBV-21C (Mars) air sentry, Racal Decca RM1290 navigation and Racal Decca RM1290 landing radars along with ARBG-1A Saïgon communications intercept, CSF ARBR 16A radar intercept electronic surveillance systems and two Dagaie decoy systems.

The frigate is equipped with a 30-by-15-metre (98 by 49 ft) helicopter landing pad located on the stern and a 10-by-15-metre (33 by 49 ft) hangar. The ship is capable of operating the embarked Eurocopter AS565 Panther up to sea state 5. However, as late as 2021, Aérospatiale Alouette III helicopters were also being embarked, notably in the Pacific region. In November 2022, the Eurocopter Dauphin N3 was earmarked to replace the Aérospatiale Alouette III on Prairial. The ship has a complement of 90 including the aircrew and officers and 24 marines with capacity for a further 13 personnel.

== Construction and career ==
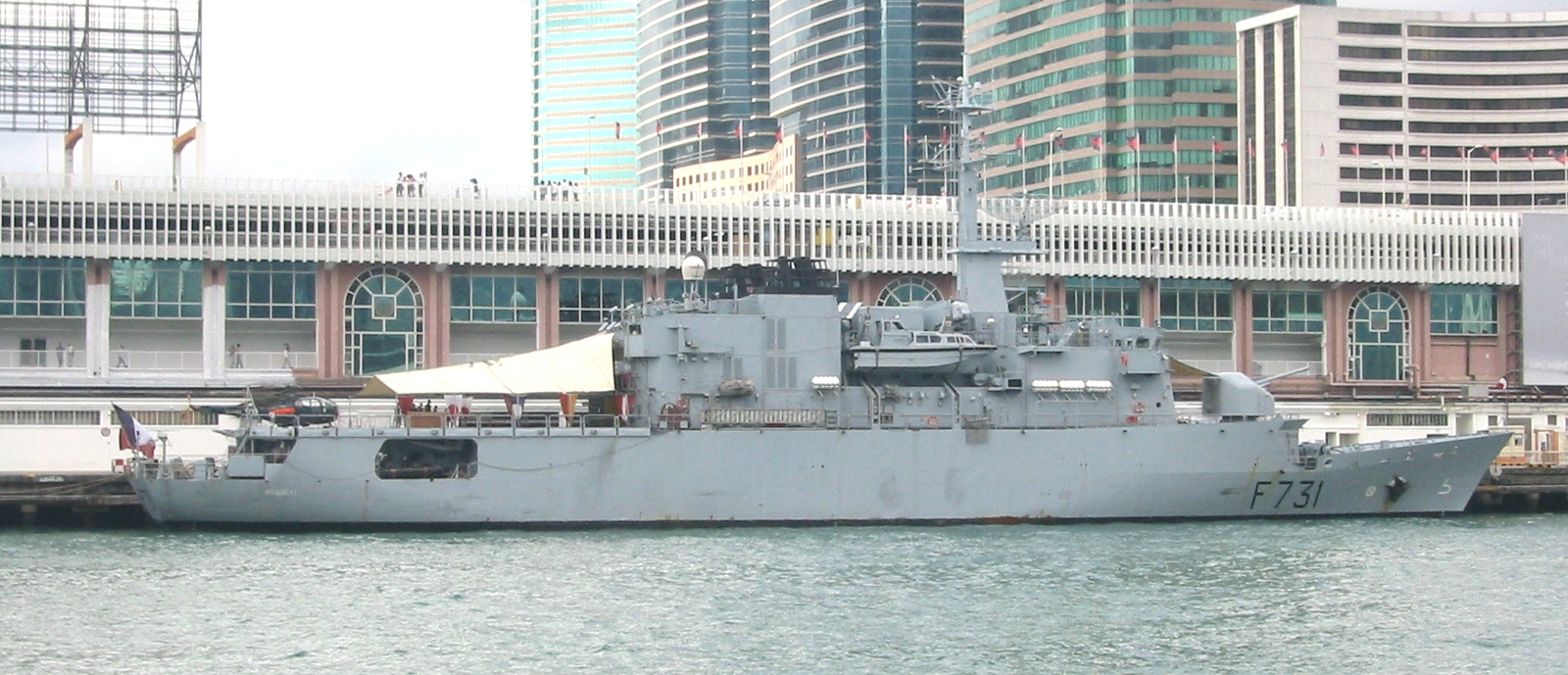
Prairial in Hong Kong with Aérospatiale Alouette III embarked, April 2006

Prairial was ordered as part of the first pair on 20 January 1989 from Chantiers de l'Atlantique for construction at their yard in Saint-Nazaire, France, and the keel was laid down on 11 September 1990. The frigate was built using modular construction methods which reduced the vessel's construction time. Prairial was launched on 16 March 1991 and commissioned into the French Navy on 20 May 1992. (Note: Jordan has the ship launched on 23 March 1991.) Following sea trials, Prairial sailed for Arsenal de Lorient, Lorient where the weapons and sensors were installed and underwent further trials.

After entering service, Prairial was assigned to the French Pacific territories, based at Tahiti. Prairial was deployed to East Timor as part of the Australian-led INTERFET peacekeeping taskforce from 16 October to 29 November 1999.

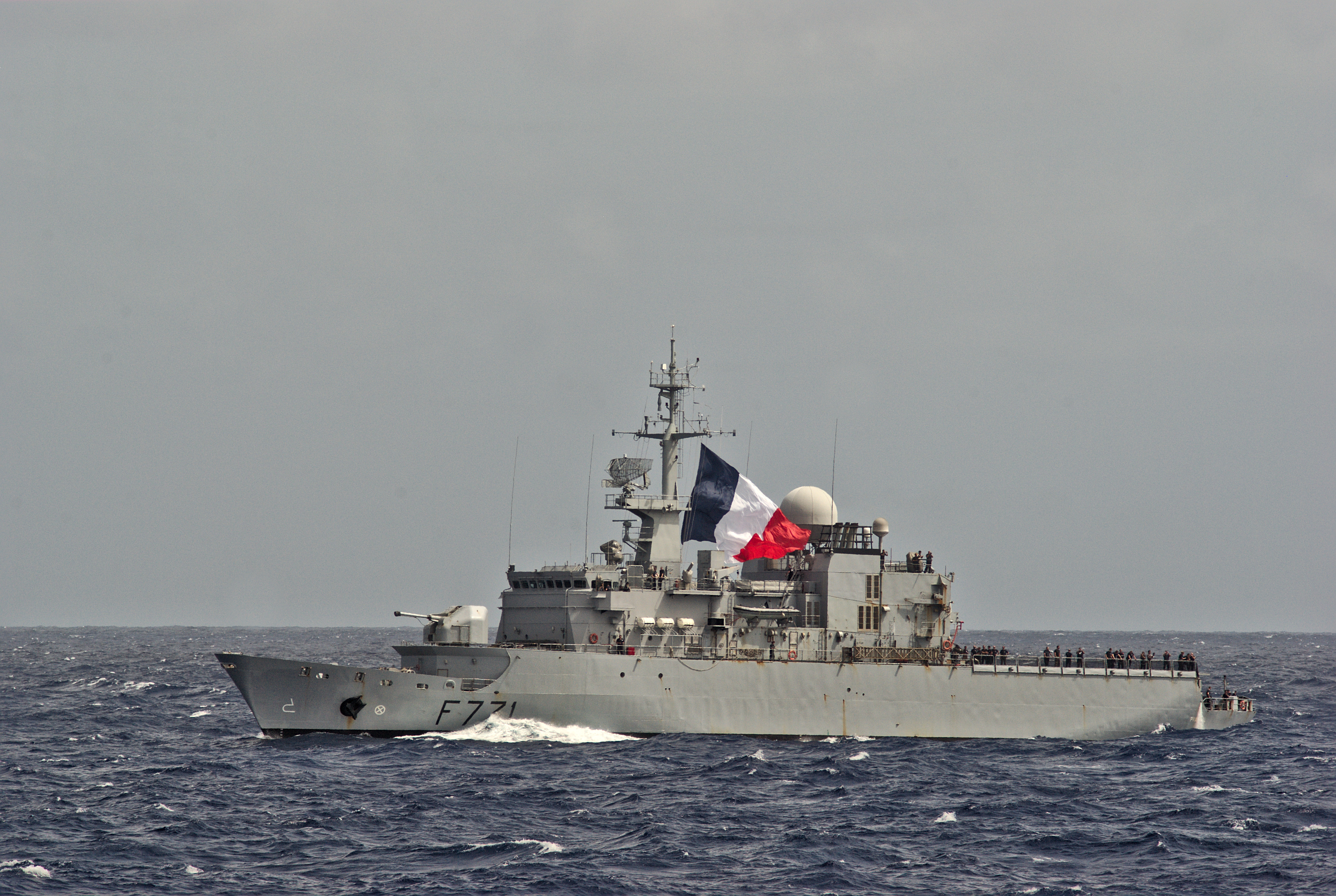
Prairial during RIMPAC 2016

On 13 February 2016, the frigate intercepted a 12-metre (39 ft), Panamanian-flagged sailboat in Pacific waters. Three crew members were arrested and 680 kilograms (1,500 lb) of cocaine was seized. In July 2016, Prairial participated in RIMPAC 2016, a large multi-national naval exercise off the coast of Hawaii, as the only representative of the European Union.

From 27 July to 2 August 2018, the frigate took part in RIMPAC 2018. In March 2019, Prairial intercepted 800 kilograms (1,800 lb) of cocaine after a panga was spotted adrift off the coast of Nicaragua in international waters.

On 22 February 2021, Prairial was deployed from February to March 2021 in the East China Sea to assist in enforcing UN sanctions against North Korea. On 10 March 2021, Prairial reported suspicious illegal ship-to-ship transfers of oil, which was announced by the French Pacific Command (ALPACI).

In June 2022, Prairial sailed to Hawaii for the naval exercise RIMPAC 2022. On 17 July 2022, a helicopter from Prairial assisted in evacuating two seriously injured sailors from the Peruvian corvette Guise to a United States Coast Guard ship during RIMPAC 2022, after the corvette suffered a significant fire during operations. Late in the year, the frigate (with its new Dauphin helicopter embarked) undertook a 36-day deployment in the South Pacific which included exercises with the Chilean Navy and patrol of the British exclusive maritime zone around the Pitcairn Islands.

In March 2023, the frigate was reported to have deployed to the South China Sea and Gulf of Thailand and made a port visit in Sihanoukville, Cambodia. In April 2023, Prairial was reported to have transited the Taiwan Strait continuing on to make port visits in South Korea and Japan and conducting exercises with a Japanese frigate.
