= French frigate Surcouf =

La Fayette-class frigate, launched 1993

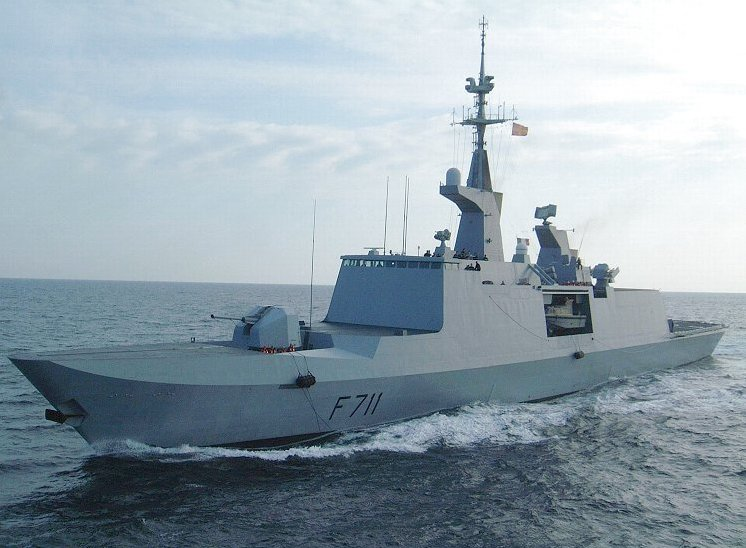

History

France
- Name: Surcouf
- Namesake: Robert Surcouf
- Laid down: 6 July 1992
- Launched: 3 July 1993
- Commissioned: 7 February 1997
- Home port: Toulon
- Identification: MMSI number: 228730000; Callsign: FASF
- Honours and awards: Flies the FFL jack in honour of the submarine Surcouf
- Status: In active service

General characteristics
- Class & type: La Fayette-class frigate
- Displacement: 3,200 tonnes; 3,600 tonnes fully loaded
- Length: 125 m (410 ft 1 in)
- Beam: 15.4 m (50 ft 6 in)
- Draught: 4.8 m (15 ft 9 in)
- Propulsion: 4 diesel SEMT Pielstick 12PA6V280 STC2, 21,000 hp (16,000 kW)
- Speed: 25 knots (46 km/h; 29 mph)
- Range: 7,000 nmi (13,000 km; 8,100 mi) at 15 knots (28 km/h; 17 mph)
- Complement: 164+
- Sensors & processing systems: 1 × Air/Surface DRBV 15C sentry radar; 1 × firing control radar for the 100 mm gun; 1 × DRBN34 navigation radar; 1 × DRBN34 landing radar; 1 x BlueWatcher sonar
- Electronic warfare & decoys: 1 × Saïgon ARBG 1 radio interceptor; 1 × ARBR 21 radar interceptor; 2 × Dagaie Mk2 chaff launcher; 1 × AN/SLQ-25 Nixie tugged noise maker; 1 × Prairie-Masker noise reduction system; 1 × Syracuse II; 1 × Inmarsat
- Armament: Anti-ship; 8 × Exocet MM40 block II anti-ship missiles; Guns; 1 × 100 mm TR automatic gun; 2 × 20 mm modèle F2 guns; Anti-aircraft; 1 × Crotale CN2 launcher (8 missiles on the launcher with 16 reload); Manually-operated 2x2 SIMBAD/Mistral point defence SAM reported fit in 2023
- Armour: On sensitive areas (munition magazine and control centre)
- Aircraft carried: 1 × helicopter (Panther or NH90)

Surcouf (F711) is a La Fayette-class frigate of the French Navy. Construction began at Lorient Naval Dockyard on 6 July 1992, launched 3 July 1993, and the ship was commissioned May 1996. Since entering service, Surcouf has taken part in numerous missions, notably in Operation Antilope (Gabon and Congo), Operation Trident (Kosovo) and Mission Khor Anga in the Djibouti zone.

== Service history ==
On 14 May 2001, Surcouf rendered assistance to the skipper of Biscuits La Trinitaine-Team Ethypharm, who had to abandon his ship after her starboard hull was seriously damaged. The catamaran's crew of five were airlifted to safety by helicopter.

On 14 October 2004, Surcouf assisted Sara 2, a Panamanian cargo ship which ran aground near Yemen. The 16-man crew was successfully airlifted by the Panther helicopter, and later transferred from the frigate to the Yemeni coast guard.

Between 17 and 21 May 2008, Surcouf participated in Exercise KhunjarHaad, a multi-national exercise held in the Gulf of Oman. Other participating warships included the American destroyer USS Russell, the British frigate HMS Montrose, the British fleet replenishment tanker RFA Wave Knight and four other coalition ships conducted air defense; surface warfare operation; visit, board, search and seizure (VBSS); and joint gunnery exercises, which focused on joint interoperability training and proficiency.

In November 2012 Surcouf deployed to the Horn of Africa as part of the European Union's Naval Operation in the area. A British Lynx HMA.8 helicopter of 815 Squadron was on board for the whole four-month deployment, along with 12 personnel including 2 Royal Marine snipers. This was the first extended deployment of a Royal Navy helicopter on a French warship and was the result of a treaty between the United Kingdom and France to share military resources and conduct more joint operations.

During a 2017–18 refit, the frigate was equipped with a Thales Bluewatcher sonar as part of a two-year trial that was subsequently extended through 2022. Surcouf was the first La Fayette-class ship to receive an active sonar capability.

In 2021, Surcouf deployed to the Pacific accompanying the French Navy helicopter assault ship Tonnerre.

In April 2022, Surcouf, with a Panther helicopter embarked, again deployed to the Indian Ocean to relieve her sister ship Guépratte. From 26 until 30 May 2022, Surcouf trained with the Kuwait Naval Force.

In October 2023 Surcouf was deployed to the Eastern Mediterranean during the Gaza war, joining the helicopter assault ship Tonnerre and the frigate Alsace which were also deployed to the region.

Surcouf had been scheduled to undergo a modest structural and technical upgrade (with the elderly Crotale SAM to be removed from the vessel) and, given somewhat reduced general purpose capability, be re-assigned to offshore patrol duties prior to her planned withdrawal from service in 2027. While initially there was some uncertainty as to whether this change in role would take place, in 2024 Admiral Nicolas Vaujour, chief of the naval staff, told the National Assembly that Surcouf and her sister ship Guépratte would undertake the offshore patrol role in order to fill a gap created by the delayed arrival of the Patrouilleurs Hauturiers OPVs. It was also subsequently reported that the frigate would be extended in service for five years, until 2032.

== Sources ==
- Frégate Surcouf
