= Moroccan frigate Mohammed V =

Ship of Royal Moroccan Navy

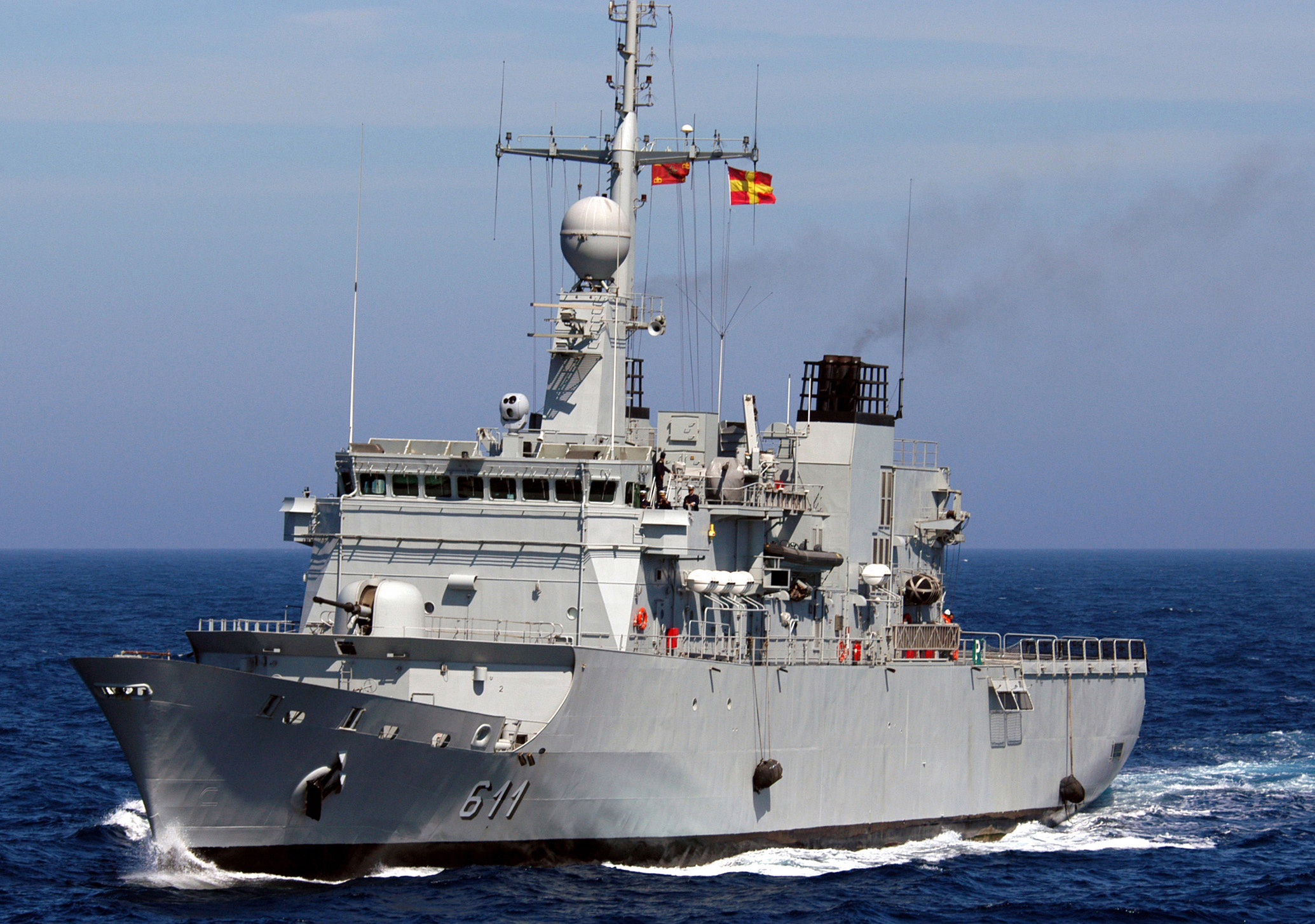
- Mohammed V in the Strait of Gibraltar in April 2005

History

Morocco
- Name: Mohammed V; (محمد الخامس)
- Namesake: Mohammed V of Morocco
- Ordered: 12 July 1999
- Builder: Chantiers de l'Atlantique
- Laid down: June 1999
- Launched: 9 March 2001
- Commissioned: 12 March 2002
- Identification: Pennant number: 611
- Status: In service

General characteristics
- Class & type: Floréal-class frigate
- Displacement: 2,600 t (2,600 long tons); 3,000 t (2,950 long tons) full load
- Length: 93.5 m (306 ft 9 in)
- Beam: 14 m (45 ft 11 in)
- Draught: 4.3 m (14 ft 1 in)
- Propulsion: 4 × SEMT Pielstick 6 PA6 L280 BPC diesel engines; 7,200 kW (9,600 hp); 2 shafts, 1 × 250 kW (340 hp) bow thruster
- Speed: 20 knots (37 km/h; 23 mph)
- Range: 10,000 nmi (19,000 km; 12,000 mi) at 15 knots (28 km/h; 17 mph)
- Complement: 89
- Sensors & processing systems: 2 × Decca Bridgemaster radar
- Electronic warfare & decoys: Thomsen-CSF ARBR 17 radar intercept; 2 Dagaie decoy systems
- Armament: 2 Exocet MM38 missiles; 1 × Otobreda 76 mm (3 in) gun turret with Najir fire control system
- Aircraft carried: 1 Panther helicopter
- Aviation facilities: Flight deck and hangar

Mohammed V (611) (Arabic: محمد الخامس) is a Floréal-class frigate of the Royal Moroccan Navy. The ship was the first to be constructed for Morocco by Chantiers de l'Atlantique at Saint-Nazaire, France, from 1999 to 2001. The frigate entered service in 2002. Mohammed V is the first of two Floréal-class frigates in Moroccan service, the other being Hassan II.

== Design and description ==
The Floréal-class frigates were designed in response to a demand for a cheap warship capable of operating in low threat areas and able to perform general patrol functions. As a result, the Floréal class were constructed to mercantile standards in the areas of ammunition stowage, helicopter facilities and damage control, which significantly lowered the cost of the vessels. The Floréal class were designed for using modular construction which shortened their building times. The Moroccan frigates of the class are similar to those in French service with a few changes.

Mohammed V has a standard displacement of 2,600 tonnes (2,600 long tons) and 3,000 tonnes (2,950 long tons) at full load. The frigate measures 85.2 metres (279 ft 6 in) long between perpendiculars and 93.5 metres (306 ft 9 in) overall with a beam of 14 metres (45 ft 11 in) and a draught of 4.3 m (14 ft 1 in). Due to the frigate's broad beam, the ship is equipped with fin stabilisers.

The frigate is powered by a combined diesel and diesel (CODAD) system comprising four SEMT Pielstick 6 PA6 L280 BPC diesel engines driving two shafts each turning a LIPS controllable pitch propeller. The CODAD system is rated at 7,200 kilowatts (9,600 hp) The vessel is also equipped with one 250-kilowatt (340 hp) bow thruster. Due to the mercantile construction design, the four diesels are all located within one machinery room for ease of maintenance. Both diesel fuel and TR5 aviation fuel is brought aboard at a single location at the stern compared to naval-constructed vessels which sport two. The ship also has three 750 kW (1,010 hp) diesel-electric generators located just fore and aft of the machinery room. Mohammed V has a maximum speed of 20 knots (37 km/h; 23 mph) and a range of 10,000 nautical miles (19,000 km; 12,000 mi) at 15 knots (28 km/h; 17 mph).

Mohammed V is armed with two Exocet MM38 surface-to-surface missiles in launchers situated centrally atop the midships superstructure. The ship also mounts one Otobreda 76 mm (3 in) gun turret with Najir fire control system located forwards. The vessel is capable of being armed with two 20 mm modèle F2 guns situated in atop the aft superstructure. In place of the 20 mm (0.8 in) guns, the Moroccan Floréal-class frigates can be fitted with twin launchers for Simbad surface-to-air missiles. The ship is equipped with two Decca Bridgemaster radars, one for use as navigational radar, the other for helicopter control, Thomsen-CSF ARBR 17 radar intercept electronic surveillance systems and two Dagaie decoy systems.

The frigate is equipped with a 30-by-15-metre (98 by 49 ft) helicopter landing pad located on the stern and a 10-by-15-metre (33 by 49 ft) hangar. The ship is capable of operating the embarked Eurocopter AS565 Panther up to sea state 5. Mohammed V is capable of operating helicopters up to the size of the Eurocopter AS332 Super Puma. The ship has a complement of 89 including officers.

== Construction and career ==
Mohammed V was ordered as the first of a pair of Floréal-class frigates on 12 July 1999 from Chantiers de l'Atlantique for construction at their yard in Saint-Nazaire, France. The vessel's keel was laid down in June 1999 and was built using modular construction methods which reduced the vessel's construction time. Mohammed V was launched on 9 March 2001 and commissioned into the Royal Moroccan Navy on 12 March 2002.

In September 2010, Mohammed V joined in joint naval exercises with the European Maritime Force off Morocco. In June 2017, the frigate trained with NATO's Standing Maritime Group 2 off Morocco. In March 2019, the ship participated in the international joint naval exercise Obangame Express 2019 that took place in the maritime area between Ivory Coast and Nigeria. In May, Mohammed V along with the French aviso Lieutenant de vaisseau Le Hénaff and the Senegalese patrol vessel Fouladou participated in a joint patrol of the Gulf of Guinea from the Ivory Coast to Senegal.
