= French frigate Ventôse =

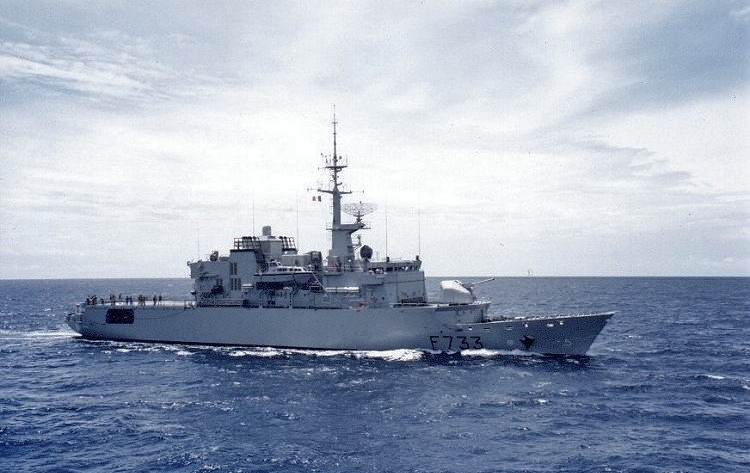
- Frigate Ventôse

History

France
- Name: Ventôse
- Namesake: Month of Ventôse
- Ordered: 9 January 1990
- Builder: Chantiers de l'Atlantique
- Laid down: 28 June 1991
- Launched: 14 March 1992
- Commissioned: 5 May 1993
- Home port: Fort de France, Martinique
- Status: in active service

General characteristics
- Class & type: Floréal-class frigate
- Displacement: 2,600 t (2,600 long tons); 3,000 t (2,950 long tons) full load
- Length: 93.5 m (306 ft 9 in)
- Beam: 14 m (45 ft 11 in)
- Draught: 4.3 m (14 ft 1 in)
- Propulsion: 4 × SEMT Pielstick 6 PA6 L280 BPC diesel engines; 6,580 kW (8,820 hp); 2 shafts, 1 × 203 kW (272 hp) bow thruster
- Speed: 20 knots (37 km/h; 23 mph)
- Range: 9,000 nmi (17,000 km; 10,000 mi) at 15 knots (28 km/h; 17 mph)
- Troops: 24 marines
- Complement: 90
- Sensors & processing systems: DRBV-21C (Mars) air sentry radar; Racal Decca RM1290 navigation radar; Racal Decca RM1290 landing radar
- Electronic warfare & decoys: ARBG-1A Saïgon; 2 Dagaie decoy systems
- Armament: 2 Exocet MM38 missiles (removed); 1 × 100 mm CADAM turret with Najir fire control system; 2 × 20 mm modèle F2 guns; 2 x 2 Manually-operated SIMBAD/Mistral point defence SAM
- Aircraft carried: 1 × Eurocopter Panther or Eurocopter Dauphin N3 helicopter
- Aviation facilities: Flight deck and hangar

Ventôse is a Floréal-class frigate (French: frégate de surveillance) of the French Navy. The frigate is the fourth ship of its class, and the first French vessel named after Ventôse, the sixth month of the Republican Calendar, the month of wind. The ship was constructed by Chantiers de l'Atlantique at Saint-Nazaire, France, in 1991–1992 and entered service in 1993. Ventôse is stationed in the French Caribbean Sea territories for patrol duties.

== Design and description ==
The Floréal-class frigates were designed in response to a demand for a cheap warship capable of operating in low threat areas and able to perform general patrol functions. As a result, the Floréal class were constructed to mercantile standards in the areas of ammunition stowage, helicopter facilities and damage control, which significantly lowered the cost of the vessels. The Floréal class were designed for using modular construction which shortened their building times.

Ventôse has a standard displacement of 2,600 tonnes (2,600 long tons) and 3,000 tonnes (2,950 long tons) at full load. The frigate measures 85.2 metres (279 ft 6 in) long between perpendiculars and 93.5 metres (306 ft 9 in) overall with a beam of 14 metres (45 ft 11 in) and a draught of 4.3 m (14 ft 1 in). Due to the frigate's broad beam, the ship is equipped with fin stabilisers.

The frigate is powered by a combined diesel and diesel (CODAD) system comprising four SEMT Pielstick 6 PA6 L280 BPC diesel engines driving two shafts each turning a LIPS controllable pitch propeller. The CODAD system is rated at 6,580 kilowatts (8,820 hp) The vessel is also equipped with one 203-kilowatt (272 hp) bow thruster. Due to the mercantile construction design, the four diesels are all located within one machinery room for ease of maintenance. Both diesel fuel and TR5 aviation fuel is brought aboard at a single location at the stern compared to naval-constructed vessels which sport two. The ship also has three 750 kW (1,010 hp) diesel-electric generators located just fore and aft of the machinery room. Ventôse has a maximum speed of 20 knots (37 km/h; 23 mph) and a range of 9,000 nautical miles (17,000 km; 10,000 mi) at 15 knots (28 km/h; 17 mph).

Ventôse was armed with two Exocet MM38 surface-to-surface missiles in launchers situated centrally atop the midships superstructure. However, at the end of the missile's life cycle in 2014, the launchers were removed as the French Navy did not intend to replace the capability aboard the ships. The ship also mounts one 100 mm CADAM turret with the Najir fire control system located forwards and two 20 mm modèle F2 guns situated in atop the aft superstructure. The ship is equipped with DRBV-21C (Mars) air sentry, Racal Decca RM1290 navigation and Racal Decca RM1290 landing radars along with ARBG-1A Saïgon communications intercept, CSF ARBR 16A radar intercept electronic surveillance systems and two Dagaie decoy systems.

The frigate is equipped with a 30-by-15-metre (98 by 49 ft) helicopter landing pad located on the stern and a 10-by-15-metre (33 by 49 ft) hangar. The ship is capable of operating the embarked Eurocopter AS565 Panther up to sea state 5. Ventôse is capable of operating helicopters up to the size of the Eurocopter AS332 Super Puma. The ship has a complement of 90 including the aircrew and officers and 24 marines with capacity for a further 13 personnel.

== Construction and career ==
Ventôse was ordered as part of the second pair on 9 January 1990 from Chantiers de l'Atlantique for construction at their yard in Saint-Nazaire, France, and the keel was laid down on 28 June 1991. The frigate was built using modular construction methods which reduced the vessel's construction time. Ventôse was launched on 14 March 1992 and commissioned into the French Navy on 5 May 1993. Following sea trials, Ventôse sailed for Arsenal de Lorient, Lorient where the weapons and sensors were installed and underwent further trials.

Ventôse is stationed in the Caribbean Sea to patrol French oversea territories in the region. The vessel was assigned to the French Antilles, stationed at Martinique. In 2005, in the aftermath of the Hurricane Katrina disaster in the United States, the frigate was offered as part of the French response. However, the United States declined France's offer. In June 2009, Ventôse took part in the recovery operation for the Air France Flight 447 which crashed some 960 kilometres (600 mi) off the northeast coast of Brazil.

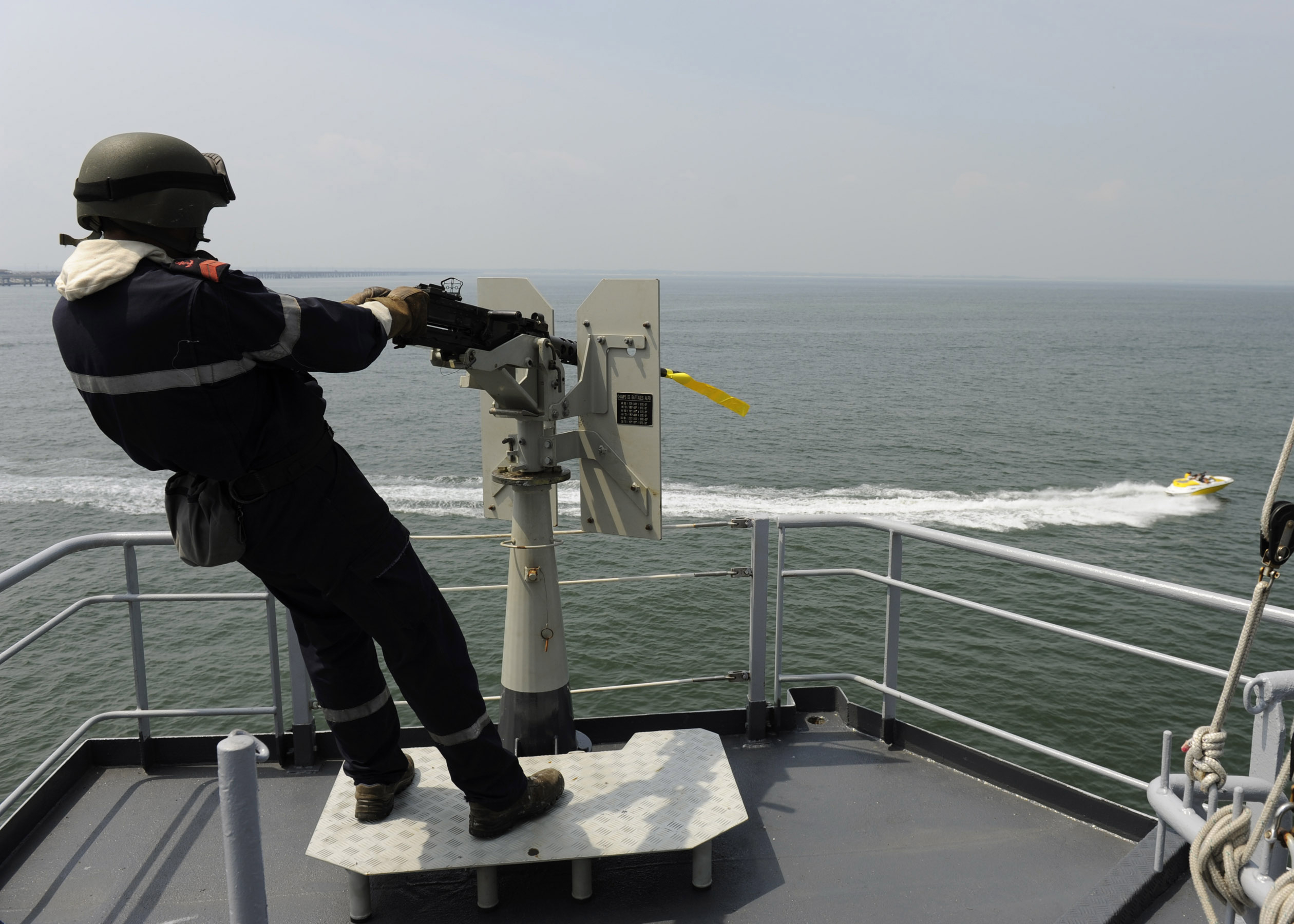
A sailor aboard Ventôse tracks a surface contact during an exercise supporting FRUKUS 2011

On 6 and 7 January 2012, Ventôse intercepted two sailboats, Jo Ann Moore and Sangria, 600 nautical miles (1,100 km; 690 mi) off Guadeloupe. Jo Ann Moore was stopped first and searched, with its four crew apprehended. Leaving a small party aboard the sailboat, the frigate made off to the southwest to catch up with the second sailboat, Sangria. The three crew members on board Sangria were arrested and 45 bundles comprising 1.2 tonnes (1.2 long tons; 1.3 short tons) of cocaine were seized. On 30 November 2012, Ventôse was alerted to the presence of a smuggler's go-fast boat by an American patrol aircraft. The smugglers were forcibly stopped and three crew were arrested along with the seizure of 838 kilograms (1,847 lb) of cocaine.

In June 2015, the frigate stopped a go-fast boat and seized 20 kilograms (44 lb) of marijuana. On 3–4 June, Ventôse moved to intercept the Anguillan-flagged coastal trading vessel Lady Margaret, suspected of smuggling. Lady Margaret was stopped without incident and the boarding party from Ventôse uncovered 524 kilograms (1,155 lb) of marijuana, which was destroyed. In September 2017, Ventôse, with sister ship Germinal, was deployed to Saint Martin after the island was hit by Hurricane Irma.

From October to November 2018, Ventôse trained with the Guyana Defence Force, then stopping at Belém, Brazil before spending the rest of the time off West Africa as part of Operation Corymbe, the permanent French mission to the Gulf of Guinea. On 26–27 May 2019 Ventôse intercepted a suspected smuggling go-fast boat off Dominica. Two smugglers were arrested and 416 kilograms (917 lb) of cocaine was seized. In January 2023 the frigate intercepted a fishing vessel in the Caribbean and seized 320 kg (710 lb) of illegally trafficked cannabis. In September 2023, Ventôse deployed to the Gulf of Guinea and was involved in an operation which seized 2.4 tonnes (2.4 long tons; 2.6 short tons) of cocaine from smugglers.
