= French frigate Guépratte =

French frigate

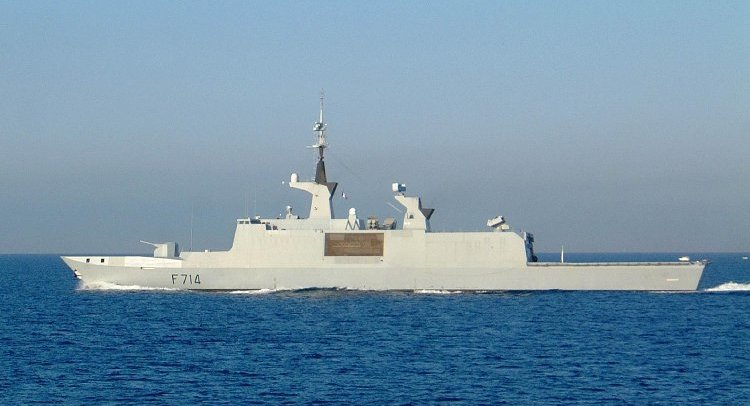

History

France
- Name: Guépratte
- Namesake: Admiral Émile Paul Amable Guépratte
- Laid down: 1 October 1998
- Launched: 3 March 1999
- Commissioned: 27 October 2001
- Home port: Toulon
- Status: in active service

General characteristics
- Class & type: La Fayette-class frigate
- Displacement: 3200 tonnes, 3600 tonnes fully loaded
- Length: 125 m (410 ft)
- Beam: 15.4 m (51 ft)
- Draught: 4.8 m (16 ft)
- Propulsion: 4 diesel SEMT Pielstick 12PA6V280 STC2, 21000 hp (15 400 kW)
- Speed: 25 knots (46 km/h)
- Range: 7,000 nautical miles (13,000 km) at 15 knots (28 km/h), 9000 at 12 knots (22 km/h)
- Complement: 164+
- Sensors & processing systems: 1 × Air/Surface DRBV 15C sentry radar; 1 × firing control radar for the 100 mm gun; 1 × DRBN34 navigation radar; 1 × DRBN34 landing radar
- Electronic warfare & decoys: 1 × Saïgon ARBG 1 radio interceptor; 1 × ARBR 21 radar interceptor; 2 × Dagaie Mk2 chaff launcher; 1 × AN/SLQ-25 Nixie tugged noise maker; 1 × Prairie-Masker noise reduction system; 1 × Syracuse II; 1 × Inmarsat
- Armament: Anti-ship; 8 × Exocet MM40 block II anti-ship missiles; Guns; 1 × 100 mm TR automatic gun; 2 × 20 mm modèle F2 guns; Anti-aircraft; 1 × Crotale CN2 launcher (8 missiles on the launcher with 16 reload)
- Armour: On sensitive areas (munition magazine and control centre)
- Aircraft carried: 1 × helicopter (Panther or NH90)

Guépratte is a general purpose La Fayette-class frigate of the French Marine Nationale. She is the second French vessel named after the 19–20th century admiral Émile Paul Amable Guépratte. The ship was commissioned in 2001 and is currently in service. She is scheduled to remain in service until 2036.

== Service history ==
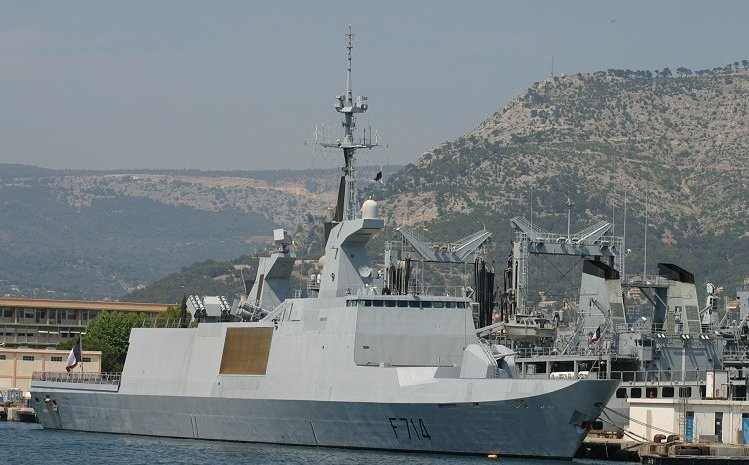
Guépratte at Toulon

She is the only frigate of the La Fayette class whose complement includes women, with 25 female crewmen on board. In January 2016, the first female commander of a frigate in the Marine Nationale was appointed to command Guépratte.

In 2016, Guépratte deployed as part of the Jeanne d'Arc battle group which included the amphibious assault ship Tonnerre.

In early 2022, Guépratte was deployed in the Indian Ocean but was expected to return to France in May after being relieved by her sister ship Surcouf. Guépratte was again in the Arabian Sea in late 2022, operating with Combined Task Force (CTF) 150, when it seized large quantities of hashish and heroin from a fishing vessel. In early 2023, it was believed that Guépratte was involved in the boarding and seizure of an Iranian vessel reported to be carrying thousands of assault rifles and anti-tank missiles destined for Yemen. The frigate returned to her home port at Toulon in March 2023.

In 2024, Guépratte was tasked to escort the helicopter assault ship Tonnerre on a prolonged deployment circumventing South America and also visiting North America.

Unlike other frigates of her class, it is not planned that she will incorporate a hull-mounted sonar system as part of her future sensor fit and therefore her potential anti-submarine capability is limited to that which might be provided by her shipborne helicopter. Guépratte is scheduled to undergo a modest structural and technical upgrade (with the elderly Crotale SAM to be removed from the vessel) and, given somewhat reduced general purpose capability, was to have been re-assigned to offshore patrol duties prior to her planned withdrawal from service in 2031. Initially there was some uncertainty as to whether the change in role would take place. However, it was later reported that Guépratte and her sister ship Surcouf would undertake the offshore patrol role in order to fill a gap created by the delayed arrival of the Patrouilleurs Hauturiers OPVs. It was also subsequently reported that the frigate would be extended in service for five years, until 2036.
