= French frigate Germinal =

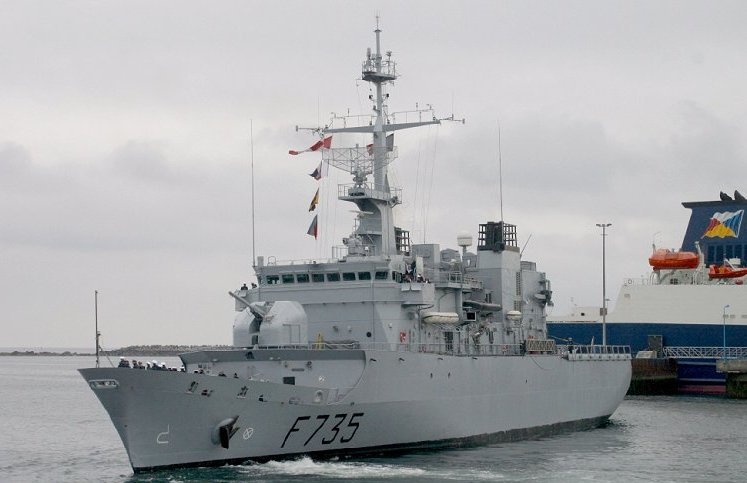
- Frigate Germinal

History

France
- Name: Germinal
- Namesake: Month of Germinal
- Ordered: January 1991
- Builder: Chantiers de l'Atlantique
- Laid down: 17 August 1992
- Launched: 14 March 1993
- Commissioned: 17 May 1994
- Identification: MMSI number: 228749000; Number F 730
- Status: In active service

General characteristics
- Class & type: Floréal-class frigate
- Displacement: 2,600 t (2,600 long tons); 3,000 t (2,950 long tons) full load
- Length: 93.5 m (306 ft 9 in)
- Beam: 14 m (45 ft 11 in)
- Draught: 4.3 m (14 ft 1 in)
- Propulsion: 4 × SEMT Pielstick 6 PA6 L280 BPC diesel engines; 6,580 kW (8,820 hp); 2 shafts, 1 × 203 kW (272 hp) bow thruster
- Speed: 20 knots (37 km/h; 23 mph)
- Range: 9,000 nmi (17,000 km; 10,000 mi) at 15 knots (28 km/h; 17 mph)
- Troops: 24 marines
- Complement: 90
- Sensors & processing systems: DRBV-21C (Mars) air sentry radar; Racal Decca RM1290 navigation radar; Racal Decca RM1290 landing radar
- Electronic warfare & decoys: ARBG-1A Saïgon; 2 Dagaie decoy systems
- Armament: 2 Exocet MM38 missiles (removed); 1 × 100 mm CADAM turret with Najir fire control system; 2 × 20 mm modèle F2 guns; 2 x 2 Manually-operated SIMBAD/Mistral point defence SAM
- Aircraft carried: 1 × Eurocopter Panther or Eurocopter Dauphin N3 helicopter
- Aviation facilities: Flight deck and hangar

Germinal is a Floréal-class frigate (French: frégate de surveillance) of the French Navy. She is the sixth and last ship of her class, and the first French vessel named after Germinal, the seventh month of the Republican Calendar. The ship was constructed at Saint-Nazaire, France, in 1992–1993 and entered service in 1994. The frigate has served in the Mediterranean and Caribbean Seas and the Gulf of Guinea. Germinal is stationed in the Antilles (Fort-de-France) for patrol duties in the Caribbean Sea.

== Design and description ==
The Floréal-class frigates were designed in response to a demand for a cheap warship capable of operating in low threat areas and able to perform general patrol functions. As a result, the Floréal class were constructed to mercantile standards in the areas of ammunition stowage, helicopter facilities and damage control, which significantly lowered the cost of the vessels. The Floréal class were designed for using modular construction which shortened their building times.

Germinal has a standard displacement of 2,600 tonnes (2,600 long tons) and 3,000 tonnes (2,950 long tons) at full load. The frigate measures 85.2 metres (279 ft 6 in) long between perpendiculars and 93.5 metres (306 ft 9 in) overall with a beam of 14 metres (45 ft 11 in) and a draught of 4.3 m (14 ft 1 in). Due to the frigate's broad beam, the ship is equipped with fin stabilisers.

The frigate is powered by a combined diesel and diesel (CODAD) system comprising four SEMT Pielstick 6 PA6 L280 BPC diesel engines driving two shafts each turning a LIPS controllable pitch propeller. The CODAD system is rated at 6,580 kilowatts (8,820 hp) The vessel is also equipped with one 203-kilowatt (272 hp) bow thruster. Due to the mercantile construction design, the four diesels are all located within one machinery room for ease of maintenance. Both diesel fuel and TR5 aviation fuel is brought aboard at a single location at the stern compared to naval-constructed vessels which sport two. The ship also has three 750 kW (1,010 hp) diesel-electric generators located just fore and aft of the machinery room. Germinal has a maximum speed of 20 knots (37 km/h; 23 mph) and a range of 9,000 nautical miles (17,000 km; 10,000 mi) at 15 knots (28 km/h; 17 mph).

Germinal was armed with two Exocet MM38 surface-to-surface missiles in launchers situated centrally atop the midships superstructure. However, at the end of the missile's life cycle in 2014, the launchers were removed as the French Navy did not intend to replace the capability aboard the ships. The ship also mounts one 100 mm CADAM turret with the Najir fire control system located forwards and two 20 mm modèle F2 guns situated in atop the aft superstructure. The ship is equipped with DRBV-21C (Mars) air sentry, Racal Decca RM1290 navigation and Racal Decca RM1290 landing radars along with ARBG-1A Saïgon communications intercept, CSF ARBR 16A radar intercept electronic surveillance systems and two Dagaie decoy systems.

The frigate is equipped with a 30-by-15-metre (98 by 49 ft) helicopter landing pad located on the stern and a 10-by-15-metre (33 by 49 ft) hangar. The ship is capable of operating the embarked Eurocopter AS565 Panther up to sea state 5. The ship is capable of operating helicopters up to the size of the Eurocopter AS332 Super Puma. The ship has a complement of 90 including the aircrew and officers and 24 marines with capacity for a further 13 personnel.

== Construction and career ==
Germinal was ordered as part of the third pair in January 1991 from Chantiers de l'Atlantique for construction at their yard in Saint-Nazaire, France, and the keel was laid down on 17 August 1992. The frigate was built using modular construction methods, which reduced the vessel's construction time. Germinal was launched on 13 March 1993 and commissioned into the French Navy on 18 May 1994. Following sea trials, Germinal sailed for Arsenal de Lorient, Lorient where the weapons and sensors were installed and underwent further trials. The vessel is stationed in the Antilles (Fort-de-France) for patrol duties in the Caribbean Sea.

In 1997, Germinal was part of the French naval presence in the Gulf of Guinea, known as the Corymbe Mission. That year, the frigate participated in Operation Espadon, evacuating French nationals from Sierra Leone.

In January 2009, Germinal was reassigned from the UNIFIL mission along the Lebanese coast to a surveillance mission along the Gaza coast for ten days, beginning on 24 January.

In 2014, while stationed at Fort-de-France, Martinique, the frigate intercepted a smuggler go-fast boat with 595 kilograms (1,312 lb) of cocaine aboard. The smugglers were turned over to the Colombian frigate ARC Caldas. In March 2015, Germinal, with support, intercepted another go-fast, this time 50 nautical miles (93 km; 58 mi) off the coast of Barbados. The frigate seized 124 kilograms (273 lb) of cocaine and 33 kilograms (73 lb) of marijuana. On 19 June 2015 Germinal caught up with a sailboat making a trans-Atlantic crossing 250 nautical miles (460 km; 290 mi) southeast of Martinique. The two crew of the sailboat were apprehended and 93.5 kilograms (206 lb) of cocaine intended for Europe was seized. In April 2016, Germinal caught another go-fast, roughly 50 kilometres (31 mi) from the Martinique coast and seized 700 kilograms (1,500 lb) of marijuana. In October, the frigate intercepted a transfer of 55 kilograms (121 lb) of cocaine between a go fast and a fishing boat 75 kilometres (47 mi) from Dominica. Then on the night of 17/18 November, while operating off the coast of Guajira Peninsula, Colombia, Germinal took part in the chase of another go-fast, seizing 780 kilograms (1,720 lb) of cocaine.

In September 2017, Germinal, with sister ship Ventôse, was deployed to Saint Martin after the island was hit by Hurricane Irma. Departing Saint Martin on 9 October, Germinal sailed for the Gulf of Guinea as part of the Corymbe Mission until December. In 2018, Germinal underwent a four-month overhaul at Fort-de-France. On 20 July 2018, the frigate seized 53 bundles of cocaine weighing a combined 1,506 kilograms (3,320 lb). Germinal intercepted a sailboat with two crew at sea. The crew set the sailboat on fire and jumped overboard and were collected by the frigate. Germinal's crew successfully extinguished the fire aboard the sailboat and then boarded it. The frigate took the two prisoners and the sailboat back to Fort-de-France.

In 2022 the frigate operated with the amphibious assault ship Tonnerre in anti-piracy operations in the Gulf of Guinea. In March 2023, she deployed to the Pacific for two months via the Panama Canal to conduct sovereignty surveillance missions in the French Pacific territories, while also carrying out port visits in Colombia, Ecuador and Mexico. In April 2023, the frigate visited the uninhabited French territory of Clipperton Island to carry out sovereignty protection duties.
