= Moroccan frigate Hassan II =

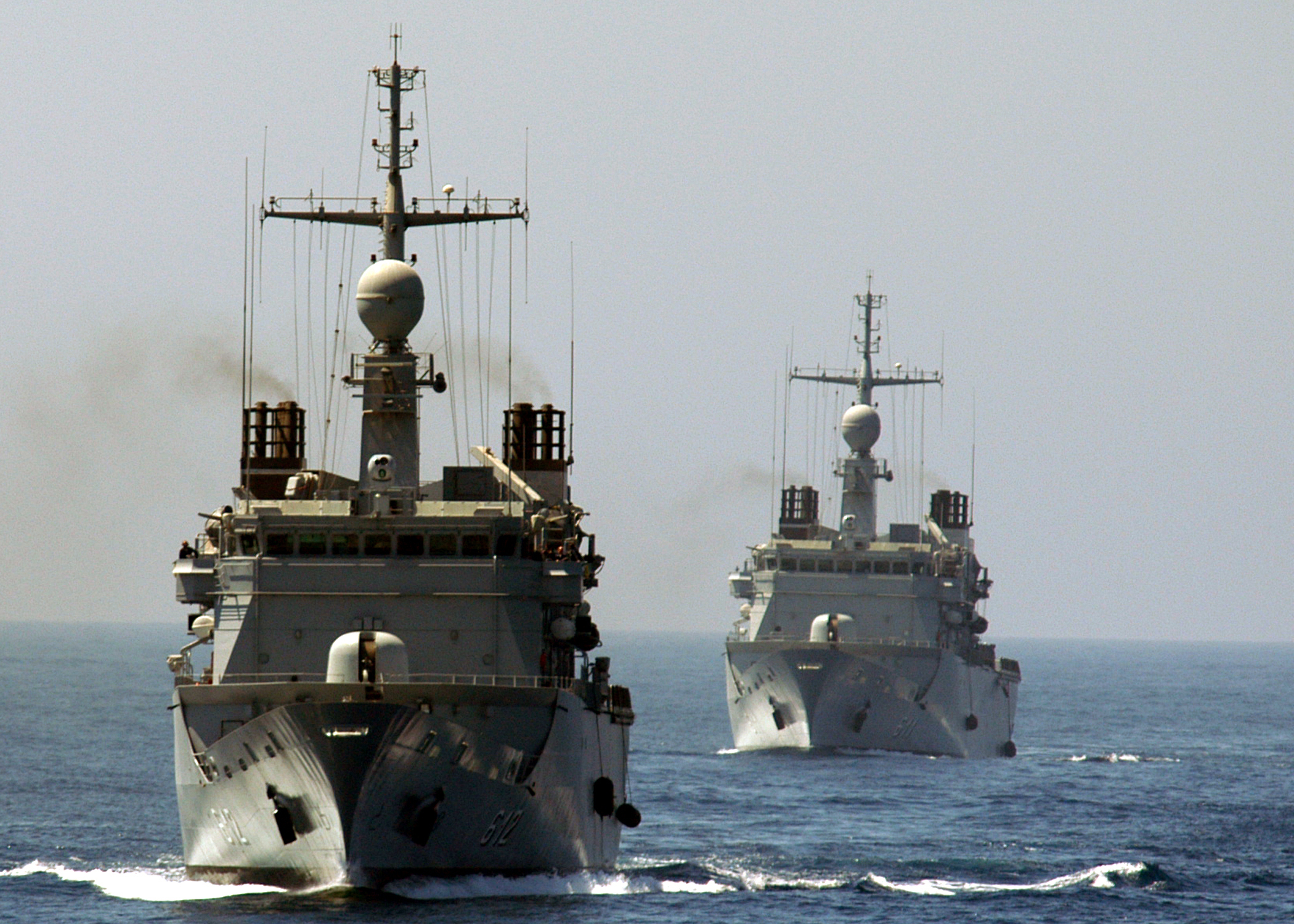
- Moroccan frigates Hassan II (rear) and Mohammed V (fore)

History

Morocco
- Name: Hassan II; (الحسن الثاني)
- Namesake: Hassan II of Morocco
- Ordered: 12 July 1999
- Builder: Chantiers de l'Atlantique, Saint-Nazaire, France
- Laid down: December 1999
- Launched: 11 February 2002
- Commissioned: 20 December 2002
- Identification: Pennant number: 612
- Status: In service

General characteristics
- Class & type: Floréal-class frigate
- Displacement: 2,600 t (2,600 long tons); 3,000 t (2,950 long tons) full load
- Length: 93.5 m (306 ft 9 in)
- Beam: 14 m (45 ft 11 in)
- Draught: 4.3 m (14 ft 1 in)
- Propulsion: 4 × SEMT Pielstick 6 PA6 L280 BPC diesel engines; 7,200 kW (9,600 hp); 2 shafts, 1 × 250 kW (340 hp) bow thruster
- Speed: 20 knots (37 km/h; 23 mph)
- Range: 10,000 nmi (19,000 km; 12,000 mi) at 15 knots (28 km/h; 17 mph)
- Complement: 89
- Sensors & processing systems: 2 × Decca Bridgemaster radar
- Electronic warfare & decoys: Thomsen-CSF ARBR 17 radar intercept; 2 Dagaie decoy systems
- Armament: 2 Exocet MM38 missiles; 1 × Otobreda 76 mm (3 in) gun turret with Najir fire control system
- Aircraft carried: 1 Panther helicopter
- Aviation facilities: Flight deck and hangar

Hassan II (612) (Arabic: الحسن الثاني) is a Floréal-class frigate of the Royal Moroccan Navy. The ship was the first to be constructed for Morocco by Chantiers de l'Atlantique at Saint-Nazaire, France, from 1999 to 2002. The frigate entered service in 2002. Hassan II is the second of two Floréal-class frigates in Moroccan service, the other being Mohammed V.

== Design and description ==
The Floréal-class frigates were designed in response to a demand for a cheap warship capable of operating in low threat areas and able to perform general patrol functions. As a result, the Floréal class were constructed to mercantile standards in the areas of ammunition stowage, helicopter facilities and damage control, which significantly lowered the cost of the vessels. The Floréal class were designed for using modular construction which shortened their building times. The Moroccan frigates of the class are similar to those in French service with a few changes.

Hassan II has a standard displacement of 2,600 tonnes (2,600 long tons) and 3,000 tonnes (2,950 long tons) at full load. The frigate measures 85.2 metres (279 ft 6 in) long between perpendiculars and 93.5 metres (306 ft 9 in) overall with a beam of 14 metres (45 ft 11 in) and a draught of 4.3 m (14 ft 1 in). Due to the frigate's broad beam, the ship is equipped with fin stabilisers.

The frigate is powered by a combined diesel and diesel (CODAD) system comprising four SEMT Pielstick 6 PA6 L280 BPC diesel engines driving two shafts each turning a LIPS controllable pitch propeller. The CODAD system is rated at 7,200 kilowatts (9,600 hp) The vessel is also equipped with one 250-kilowatt (340 hp) bow thruster. Due to the mercantile construction design, the four diesels are all located within one machinery room for ease of maintenance. Both diesel fuel and TR5 aviation fuel is brought aboard at a single location at the stern compared to naval-constructed vessels which sport two. The ship also has three 750 kW (1,010 hp) diesel-electric generators located just fore and aft of the machinery room. Hassan II has a maximum speed of 20 knots (37 km/h; 23 mph) and a range of 10,000 nautical miles (19,000 km; 12,000 mi) at 15 knots (28 km/h; 17 mph).

Hassan II is armed with two Exocet MM38 surface-to-surface missiles in launchers situated centrally atop the midships superstructure. The ship also mounts one Otobreda 76 mm (3 in) gun turret with Najir fire control system located forwards. The vessel is capable of being armed with two 20 mm modèle F2 guns situated in atop the aft superstructure. In place of the 20 mm (0.8 in) guns, the Moroccan Floréal-class frigates can be fitted with twin launchers for Simbad surface-to-air missiles. The ship is equipped with two Decca Bridgemaster radars, one for use as navigational radar, the other for helicopter control, Thomsen-CSF ARBR 17 radar intercept electronic surveillance systems and two Dagaie decoy systems.

The frigate is equipped with a 30-by-15-metre (98 by 49 ft) helicopter landing pad located on the stern and a 10-by-15-metre (33 by 49 ft) hangar. The ship is capable of operating the embarked Eurocopter AS565 Panther up to sea state 5. Hassan II is capable of operating helicopters up to the size of the Eurocopter AS332 Super Puma. The ship has a complement of 89 including officers.

== Construction and career ==
Hassan II was ordered as the second of a pair of Floréal-class frigates on 12 July 1999 from Chantiers de l'Atlantique for construction at their yard in Saint-Nazaire, France. The vessel's keel was laid down in December 1999 and was built using modular construction methods which reduced the ship's construction time. Hassan II was launched on 11 February 2002 and commissioned into the Royal Moroccan Navy on 20 December 2002.

Beginning in September 2013, the frigate underwent a six-week refit at the Portuguese shipyard ALFEITE. In 2014, Hassan II trained with United States Navy vessels in the Mediterranean Sea as part of Operation Phoenix Express. In 2018, the ship took part in the international joint naval exercise Neptune Trident, operating alongside the Royal Canadian Navy in the Gulf of Guinea. In 2019, Hassan II and the corvette Allal Ben Abdellah were deployed to multiple European ports to train with European navies, stopping in the Netherlands, France and Germany.
