= MV Safmarine Asia =

Container ship attacked by Somali pirates in 2009

History
- Name: Safmarine Asia
- Operator: Safmarine
- Port of registry: Monrovia, Liberia
- Ordered: 1 September 1984
- Yard number: 208
- Launched: 26 July 1985
- Completed: 1985, but was lengthened in 1989
- Identification: IMO number: 8413887

General characteristics
- Type: container ship
- Tonnage: 21,887 GT; 31,290 DWT
- Length: 190 m (623 ft 4 in)
- Beam: 28 m (91 ft 10 in)
- Draft: 11 m (36 ft 1 in)
- Speed: 18.5 knots (34.3 km/h; 21.3 mph)
- Crew: 19
- Notes: Safmarine Asia, vesseltracker.com

MV Safmarine Asia is a ship operated by the South African shipping company Safmarine that was unsuccessfully attacked by Somali pirates on 14 April 2009. The French frigate Nivôse responded to the vessel's distress call, and in the process, found and apprehended 11 Somali pirates. There were tried for piracy in Kenya. The pirates were then landed at Mombasa for trial in Kenya on 22 April 2009.
