= Émile Guépratte =

French admiral (1856–1939)

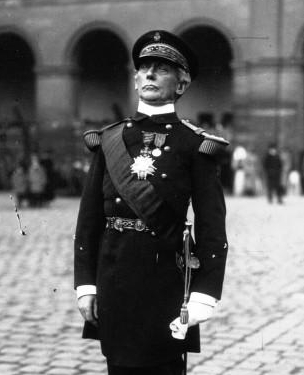
- Guépratte in 1925
- Born: Émile Paul Aimable Guépratte; 30 August 1856; Granville, France
- Died: 21 November 1939 (aged 83); Brest, France
- Burial place: Cathedral of Saint-Louis-des-Invalides, Paris
- Education: École navale
- Relatives: Capitaine de vaisseau Charles Émile Guépratte (father); Contre-amiral Aimable-Constant Jéhenne (grandfather)
- Military career
- Allegiance: France
- Branch: French Navy
- Service years: 1874–1918
- Rank: Vice-admiral
- Nicknames: Point d'honneur ("point of honour" by the French); Fire eater (by the British); Srpska majka ("Serbian mother" by the Serbs)
- Conflicts: Battle of Gallipoli
- Awards: Grand Cross of the Legion of Honour; Order of St George; White Eagle
- Other work: Member of the National Assembly for Finistère

Émile Paul Aimable Guépratte (French pronunciation: [emil ɡepʁat]; 30 August 1856 – 21 November 1939) was a French admiral who served during World War I. After the war he became active in politics, serving as a deputy in the National Assembly for Finistère from 1919 to 1924. He was made a Grand Cross of the Legion of Honour in 1924.

== Biography ==
Guépratte was born in Granville to a family of naval officers. He studied at the Lycée impérial in Brest from 1868, and joined the École Navale on 1 October 1871. He was made an officer on 5 October 1874, and promoted to Enseigne de vaisseau on 1 December 1877. He served in Tunisia aboard the Marengo. He studied torpedo operations and served on the Amiral Duperré as a torpedo expert before receiving his first command in 1889.

In 1891, he was second officer of the Forfait. He went on to command the gunboat Caronade in Indochina, the anti-submarine defences of Brest, a destroyer and the cruiser Foudre, rising in rank to capitaine de vaisseau.

On 26 May 1906, Guépratte took command of the Jeanne d'Arc.

Guépratte was promoted to contre-amiral on 2 September 1912. At the outbreak of the First World War, he led a squadron of old battleships in the Mediterranean. He was sent to the Dardanelles to back the British Mediterranean Fleet of Admiral Sackville Carden.

On 3 November 1914, the Suffren, Vérité, Indomitable and Indefatigable started shelling the forts defending the strait, initiating the Naval operations in the Dardanelles Campaign.

The main attack took place on 18 March, Guépratte leading the forwards squadron. The fleet was taken into a well-prepared minefield, under fire from coastal artillery. The Irresistible, Ocean and Bouvet were sunk; the French flagship Suffren was seriously damaged, as well as the Gaulois. Nevertheless, Admiral John de Robeck lauded the spirit of the French line.

Guépratte took part in the naval part of the later joint operation with the Mediterranean Expeditionary Force, deploring the lack of first-class French units in the theater. He was eventually promoted to vice-admiral on 10 October 1915, allegedly to bring him away from combat operations, where he was deemed impetuous, to a safer area of activity.

Guépratte was retired on 30 August 1918 and took up a career as a politician. He was elected to the National Assembly of France on 16 November 1919 on a left-wing list. He specialised in parliamentary affairs of the Navy. He retired from political life in 1924. He died in Brest in 1939.

== Honours ==
Guépratte's tomb is in Les Invalides, where French military heroes are buried. A street in Belgrade is named after him.

- Grand Cross of the Legion of Honour (12 December 1924)
- Cross of the Order of St George (28 December 1916)
- Order of the White Eagle (Serbian order, 2 September 1917)
- Order of Karađorđe's Star
- French frigate Guépratte named after him
- French destroyer Guépratte named after him. The ship was launched 1954 at ACB, Nantes and carried the pennant number D632. Decommissioned 5 August 1985, it was sunk in an exercise in 1994
