= French frigate Floréal =

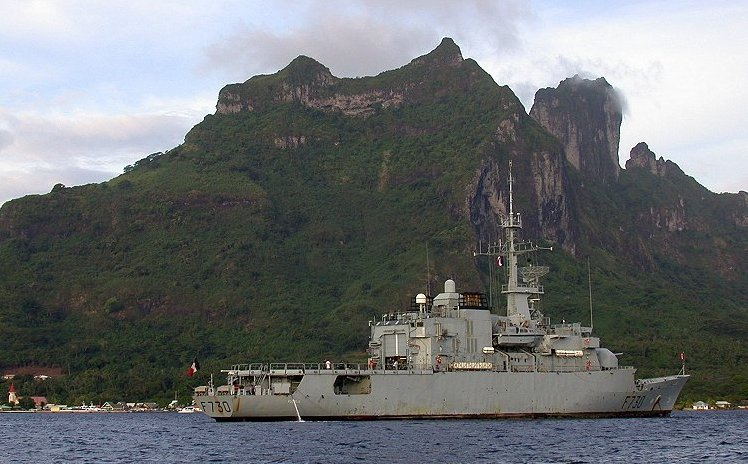
- Floréal in Bora-Bora

History

France
- Name: Floréal
- Namesake: Month of Floréal
- Ordered: 20 January 1989
- Builder: Chantiers de l'Atlantique
- Laid down: 2 April 1990
- Launched: 6 October 1990
- Commissioned: 27 May 1992
- Home port: Port des Galets, La Réunion
- Status: In service

General characteristics
- Class & type: Floréal-class frigate
- Displacement: 2,600 t (2,600 long tons); 3,000 t (2,950 long tons) full load
- Length: 93.5 m (306 ft 9 in)
- Beam: 14 m (45 ft 11 in)
- Draught: 4.3 m (14 ft 1 in)
- Propulsion: 4 × SEMT Pielstick 6 PA6 L280 BPC diesel engines; 6,580 kW (8,820 hp); 2 shafts, 1 × 203 kW (272 hp) bow thruster
- Speed: 20 knots (37 km/h; 23 mph)
- Range: 9,000 nmi (17,000 km; 10,000 mi) at 15 knots (28 km/h; 17 mph)
- Troops: 24 marines
- Complement: 90
- Sensors & processing systems: DRBV-21C (Mars) air sentry radar; Racal Decca RM1290 navigation radar; Racal Decca RM1290 landing radar
- Electronic warfare & decoys: ARBG-1A Saïgon; 2 Dagaie decoy systems
- Armament: 2 Exocet MM38 missiles (removed); 1 × 100 mm CADAM turret with Najir fire control system; 2 × 20 mm modèle F2 guns; 2 x 2 Manually-operated SIMBAD/Mistral point defence SAM
- Aircraft carried: 1 Panther helicopter
- Aviation facilities: Flight deck and hangar

Floréal is the lead ship of the Floréal-class frigates (French: frégates de surveillance) of the French Navy. Floréal is the first French vessel named after the eighth month of the Republican Calendar. The ship was constructed by Chantiers de l'Atlantique at Saint-Nazaire, France, in 1992 and entered service in 1993. Floréal is stationed at Réunion in the Indian Ocean for patrol duties.

== Design and description ==
The Floréal-class frigates were designed in response to a demand for a cheap warship capable of operating in low threat areas and able to perform general patrol functions. As a result, the Floréal class were constructed to mercantile standards in the areas of ammunition stowage, helicopter facilities and damage control, which significantly lowered the cost of the vessels. The Floréal class were designed for using modular construction which shortened their building times.

Floréal has a standard displacement of 2,600 tonnes (2,600 long tons) and 3,000 tonnes (2,950 long tons) at full load. The frigate measures 85.2 metres (279 ft 6 in) long between perpendiculars and 93.5 metres (306 ft 9 in) overall with a beam of 14 metres (45 ft 11 in) and a draught of 4.3 m (14 ft 1 in). Due to the frigate's broad beam, the ship is equipped with fin stabilisers.

The frigate is powered by a combined diesel and diesel (CODAD) system comprising four SEMT Pielstick 6 PA6 L280 BPC diesel engines driving two shafts each turning a LIPS controllable pitch propeller. The CODAD system is rated at 6,580 kilowatts (8,820 hp) The vessel is also equipped with one 203-kilowatt (272 hp) bow thruster. Due to the mercantile construction design, the four diesels are all located within one machinery room for ease of maintenance. Both diesel fuel and TR5 aviation fuel is brought aboard at a single location at the stern compared to naval-constructed vessels which sport two. The ship also has three 750 kW (1,010 hp) diesel-electric generators located just fore and aft of the machinery room. Floréal has a maximum speed of 20 knots (37 km/h; 23 mph) and a range of 9,000 nautical miles (17,000 km; 10,000 mi) at 15 knots (28 km/h; 17 mph).

Floréal was armed with two Exocet MM38 surface-to-surface missiles in launchers situated centrally atop the midships superstructure. However, at the end of the missile's life cycle in 2014, the launchers were removed as the French Navy did not intend to replace the capability aboard the ships. The ship also mounts one 100 mm CADAM turret with the Najir fire control system located forwards and two 20 mm modèle F2 guns situated in atop the aft superstructure. The ship is equipped with DRBV-21C (Mars) air sentry, Racal Decca RM1290 navigation and Racal Decca RM1290 landing radars along with ARBG-1A Saïgon communications intercept, CSF ARBR 16A radar intercept electronic surveillance systems and two Dagaie decoy systems.

The frigate is equipped with a 30-by-15-metre (98 by 49 ft) helicopter landing pad located on the stern and a 10-by-15-metre (33 by 49 ft) hangar. The ship is capable of operating the embarked Eurocopter AS565 Panther up to sea state 5. Floréal is capable of operating helicopters up to the size of the Eurocopter AS332 Super Puma. Based out of Réunion, she most commonly operates the AS565 Panther. The ship has a complement of 90 including the aircrew and officers and 24 marines with capacity for a further 13 personnel.

== Construction and career ==
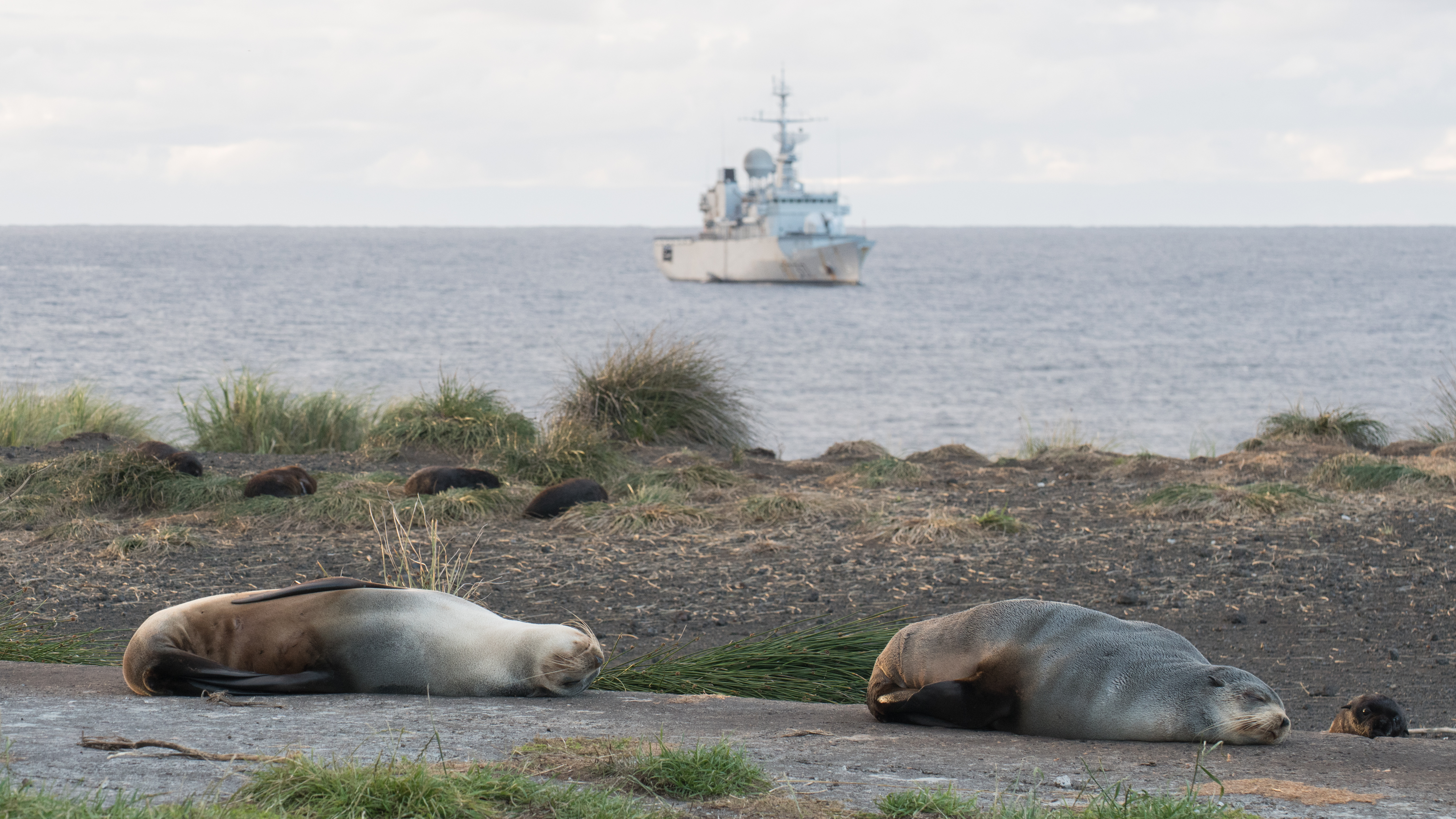
Floréal in the background, behind resting subantartic fur seals on Île Amsterdam

Floréal was ordered as part of the first pair on 20 January 1989 from Chantiers de l'Atlantique for construction at their yard in Saint-Nazaire, France, and the keel was laid down on 2 April 1990. The frigate was built using modular construction methods, which reduced the vessel's construction time. Floréal was launched on 6 October 1990 and commissioned into the French Navy on 27 May 1992. Following sea trials, Floréal sailed for Arsenal de Lorient, Lorient where the weapons and sensors were installed and underwent further trials.

After entering service, Floréal was assigned to the French Pacific territories, based at Réunion, monitoring of the exclusive economic zone in the French Southern and Antarctic Lands. In October 1995, one week after Bob Denard overthrew the government of the Comoros in late September, French commandos using the frigate as a base of operations, landed in the island and arrested Denard. In 2002, Floréal's helicopter drove off pirates that were attacking the Lebanese vessel Princess Sarah off Somalia. In 2003, Floréal underwent a major overhaul at Papeete, Tahiti.

On 17 March 2009, Floréal contacted the private yacht Tanit, which was sailing for Kenya, about entering the Gulf of Aden and the dangers of piracy. The owners of the yacht, Florent and Chloë Lemaçon, decided to continue on their journey. The frigate escorted the yacht until 20 March, when the frigate was not allowed to go any farther. On 4 April, Tanit was seized by pirates off the coast of Ras Hafun, Somalia and those aboard taken hostage. Floréal took part in the action that led to the release of Tanit during which one of the hostages and two of the pirates were killed. On 5 December 2014, the frigate searched three vessels illegally fishing near Juan de Nova Island. Shark fins without carcasses were found and as a result 2.4 tonnes (2.4 long tons; 2.6 short tons) of fishery products were destroyed.

On 10 October 2017, while at the port of Durban, South Africa, Floréal was struck by a container ship that had broken its hawsers during a storm and drifted into the frigate. The frigate was seriously damaged. The ship was repaired at Mauritius.

In 2018, the frigate was assigned to Combined Task Force 150 (CTF 150), intercepting drug smuggling in the Indian Ocean. Floréal seized 7.4 tonnes (7.3 long tons; 8.2 short tons) of cannabis after searching two dhows off Oman. In 2019, the vessel joined CTF 150 again and intercepted 5.45 tonnes (5.36 long tons; 6.01 short tons) of cannabis. On 28 May 2019, the frigate moved to inspect an un-flagged dhow in the Indian Ocean. During the inspection, 520 kilograms (1,150 lb) of heroin was found and seized.

Floréal responded to wildfires on Île Amsterdam after a week-long voyage from Réunion in March 2025. The frigate landed firefighters and other personnel. The crew assessed damage to the island and its facilities, which had been evacuated on 17 January.
