= Floréal-class frigate =

1990s type of French warships

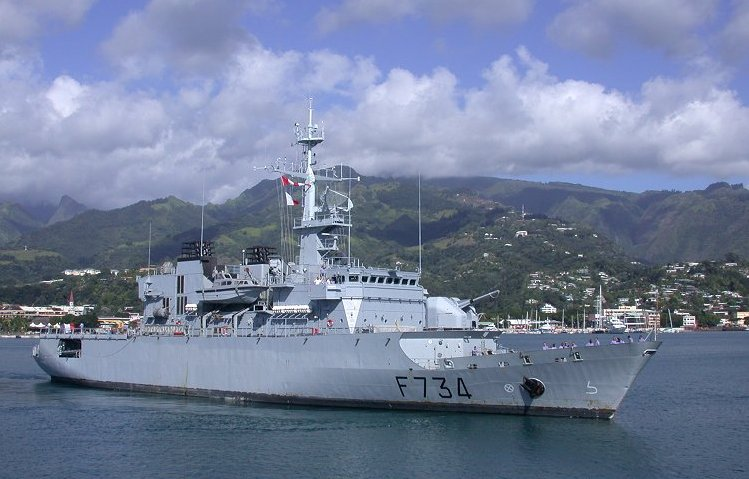
- Frigate Vendémiaire of the French Navy

Class overview
- Name: Floréal class
- Builders: Chantiers de l'Atlantique, Saint-Nazaire
- Operators: French Navy; Royal Moroccan Navy
- Preceded by: D'Estienne d'Orves class
- Succeeded by: La Fayette class; European Patrol Corvette (planned from c. 2034)
- In commission: 1992–present
- Completed: 6 (France); 2 (Morocco)
- Active: 6 (France); 2 (Morocco)

General characteristics of French frigates
- Type: Frigate
- Displacement: 2,642 t (2,600 long tons); 3,000 t (2,950 long tons) full load
- Length: 93.5 m (306 ft 9 in)
- Beam: 14 m (45 ft 11 in)
- Draught: 4.3 m (14 ft 1 in)
- Propulsion: 4 × SEMT Pielstick 6 PA6 L280 BPC diesel engines; 6,580 kW (8,820 hp); 2 shafts, 1 × 203 kW (272 hp) bow thruster
- Speed: 20 knots (37 km/h; 23 mph)
- Range: 9,000 nmi (17,000 km; 10,000 mi) at 15 knots (28 km/h; 17 mph)
- Troops: 24 marines
- Complement: 90
- Sensors & processing systems: DRBV-21C (Mars) air sentry radar; Racal Decca RM1290 navigation radar; Racal Decca RM1290 landing radar
- Electronic warfare & decoys: ARBG-1A Saïgon; 2 Dagaie decoy systems
- Armament: 2 Exocet MM38 missiles (originally fitted; now removed); 1 × 100 mm CADAM turret with Najir fire control system; 2 × 20 mm modèle F2 guns; 2 x 2 Manually-operated SIMBAD/Mistral point defence SAM
- Aircraft carried: 1 Panther helicopter or Dauphin N3 (replaced former Aérospatiale Alouette III on some ships in 2022).
- Aviation facilities: Flight deck and hangar

The Floréal class is a type of light "surveillance frigates" (French: frégate de surveillance) designed for the needs of the French Navy in low-threat environments ordered in 1989. The ships are named after months of the Republican Calendar. They use construction standards of commercial ships. The frigates were built between 1990 and 1993 by the Chantiers de l'Atlantique at Saint-Nazaire, France. The six French ships of the class, Floréal, Prairial, Nivôse, Ventôse, Vendémiaire and Germinal, remain in active service.

The ships' main armament was two Exocet MM38 surface-to-surface missiles and a 100 mm (4 in) CADAM turret, but in 2014, the Exocets were removed at the end of their life cycle. The vessels have a maximum speed of 20 knots (37 km/h; 23 mph) and can carry 24 marines. The vessels are used mainly to patrol the French overseas departments and regions in the Pacific, Indian Ocean and Caribbean regions, but have served in both military and humanitarian operations in the Persian Gulf and the Gulf of Guinea.

Two more ships were ordered by the Royal Moroccan Navy in July 1999. Constructed by Chantiers de l'Atlantique in 2001–2002, they resemble the French vessels with minor changes. Their main armament are the two Exocet missiles and a Otobreda 76 mm (3 in) gun. The two frigates, Mohammed V and Hassan II, entered service in 2002–2003 and are used primarily for training and patrol.

== Design and description ==
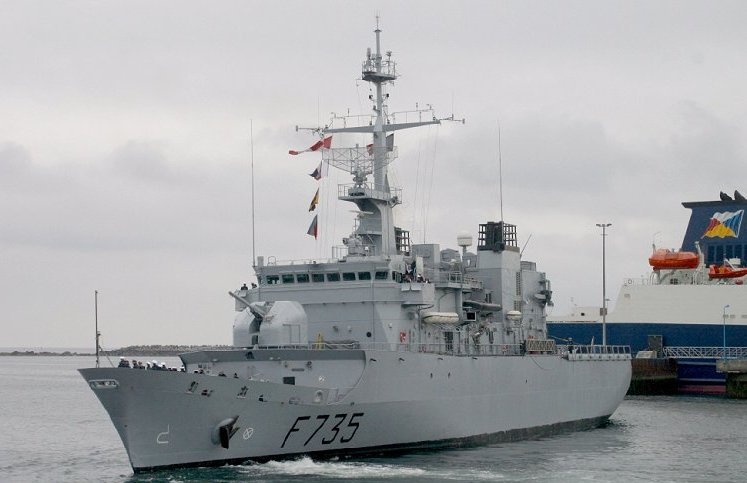
Germinal at Cherbourg

The Floréal class evolved out of a need to produce a cheaper frigate for patrol in the low-threat environments of France's territorial waters and exclusive economic zone. The hull and superstructure are made of welded steel with transverse bulkheads. Frigates of the Floréal class have a standard displacement of 2,642 tonnes (2,600 long tons) and 3,000 tonnes (2,950 long tons) at full load. The frigates measure 85.2 metres (279 ft 6 in) long between perpendiculars and 93.5 metres (306 ft 9 in) overall with a beam of 14 metres (45 ft 11 in) and a draught of 4.3 m (14 ft 1 in). Due to the frigates' broad beams, they are equipped with fin stabilisers.

The frigates are powered by a combined diesel and diesel (CODAD) system comprising four SEMT Pielstick 6 PA6 L280 BPC diesel engines driving two shafts each turning a LIPS controllable pitch propeller. The CODAD system is rated at 6,580 kilowatts (8,820 hp) The vessels are also equipped with one 203-kilowatt (272 hp) bow thruster. They also have twin rudders. Due to the mercantile construction design, the four diesels are all located within one machinery room for ease of maintenance. Both diesel fuel and TR5 aviation fuel is brought aboard at a single location at the stern compared to naval-constructed vessels which sport two. The ships also have three 750 kW (1,010 hp) diesel-electric generators located just fore and aft of the machinery room. The Floréal-class frigates have a maximum speed of 20 knots (37 km/h; 23 mph) and a range of 9,000 nautical miles (17,000 km; 10,000 mi) at 15 knots (28 km/h; 17 mph).

The class was initially only to be armed with the weaponry that would be required for the patrol mission, but this was later increased. The frigates were armed with two Exocet MM38 surface-to-surface missiles in launchers situated centrally atop the midships superstructure. Each missile had a range of 42 kilometres (26 mi), carried a 165 kg (364 lb) warhead and could reach speeds up to Mach 0.9. However, at the end of the missile's life cycle in 2014, the launchers were removed as the French Navy did not intend to replace the capability aboard the ships. The ships mount one 100 mm CADAM turret with the Najir fire control system located forwards. The 100 mm (4 in) gun can fire 78 rounds per minute, each round weighing 13.5 kg (30 lb) up to a range of 17 kilometres (11 mi). The frigates are also equipped with two 20 mm modèle F2 guns situated in atop the aft superstructure which can fire 720 rounds per minute up to 10 kilometres (6.2 mi). The frigates are equipped with DRBV-21C (Mars) air sentry, Racal Decca RM1290 navigation and Racal Decca RM1290 landing radars along with ARBG-1A Saïgon communications intercept, CSF ARBR 16A radar intercept electronic surveillance systems and two Dagaie decoy systems.

Ships of the Floréal class mount a 30-by-15-metre (98 by 49 ft) helicopter landing pad located on the stern and a 10-by-15-metre (33 by 49 ft) hangar. The frigates are capable of operating the embarked Eurocopter AS565 Panther up to sea state 5, and are capable of operating helicopters up to the size of the Eurocopter AS332 Super Puma. However, as late as 2021, Aérospatiale Alouette III helicopters were also being embarked, notably in the Pacific region. In 2022, the Eurocopter Dauphin N3 was earmarked to replace the Aérospatiale Alouette III aboard some ships when the Alouette IIIs were withdrawn from service. The vessels have a complement of 90 including the aircrew and officers and 24 marines with capacity for a further 13 personnel. The ships are equipped with improved medical facilities including a consultation room and hospital beds for use during humanitarian missions.

== Construction ==
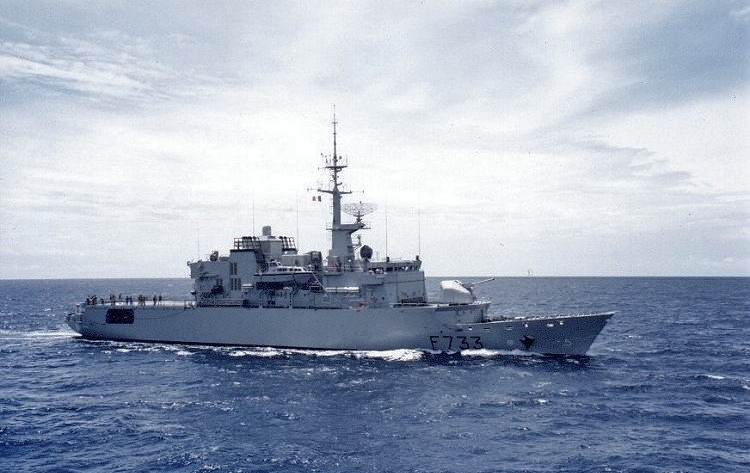
Ventôse

The first two ships were ordered on 20 January 1989, the second pair on 9 January 1990 and the final two in January 1991. The ships are named after months of the Republican Calendar. The ships were built by Chantiers de l'Atlantique at Saint-Nazaire, France. They were built using civilian construction methods as a cost saving measure. The reduction in cost allowed the French Navy to build three for the price of one La Fayette-class frigate. This method was also used for the later La Fayette class. Following sea trials, the vessels were sent to Arsenal de Lorient at Lorient to have their weapons installed.

=== Ships in class ===
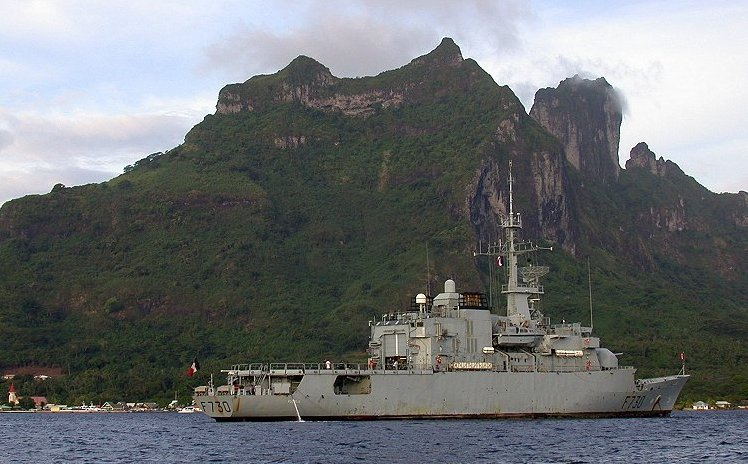
Floréal at Bora-Bora

Construction data
Pennant no.	Name	Builder	Laid down	Launched	Commissioned	Status
F 730	Floréal	Chantiers de l'Atlantique, Saint-Nazaire, France	2 April 1990	6 October 1990	27 May 1992	In service
F 731	Prairial	Chantiers de l'Atlantique, Saint-Nazaire, France	11 September 1990	16 March 1991	20 May 1992	In service
F 732	Nivôse	Chantiers de l'Atlantique, Saint-Nazaire, France	16 January 1991	10 August 1991	16 October 1992	In service
F 733	Ventôse	Chantiers de l'Atlantique, Saint-Nazaire, France	28 June 1991	14 March 1992	5 May 1993	In service
F 734	Vendémiaire	Chantiers de l'Atlantique, Saint-Nazaire, France	17 January 1992	23 August 1992	21 October 1993	In service
F 735	Germinal	Chantiers de l'Atlantique, Saint-Nazaire, France	17 August 1992	14 March 1993	18 May 1994	In service

== Service ==
The Floréal-class frigates main purpose for the French Navy is to patrol and support French forces in the French overseas departments and regions. The vessels can also be used for humanitarian missions, ship escort and special missions. Floréal and Nivôse are based at Réunion, Vendémiaire at Nouméa, Prairial at Tahiti and Ventôse and Germinal at Martinique. The frigates have served in military operations as part of the Australian-led INTERFET, in Operation Enduring Freedom in the Persian Gulf and in Operation Atalanta off the coast of Somalia. They have served in hurricane relief forces, and recovery operations for crashed aircraft.

It is anticipated that the class will be replaced in French service in the mid-to-latter 2030s with the planned European Patrol Corvette. In 2025 it was reported that the ships would have to be retained in service for several more years beyond the retirement dates that had been originally planned for the early 2030s.

== Export variants ==
=== Royal Moroccan Navy ===
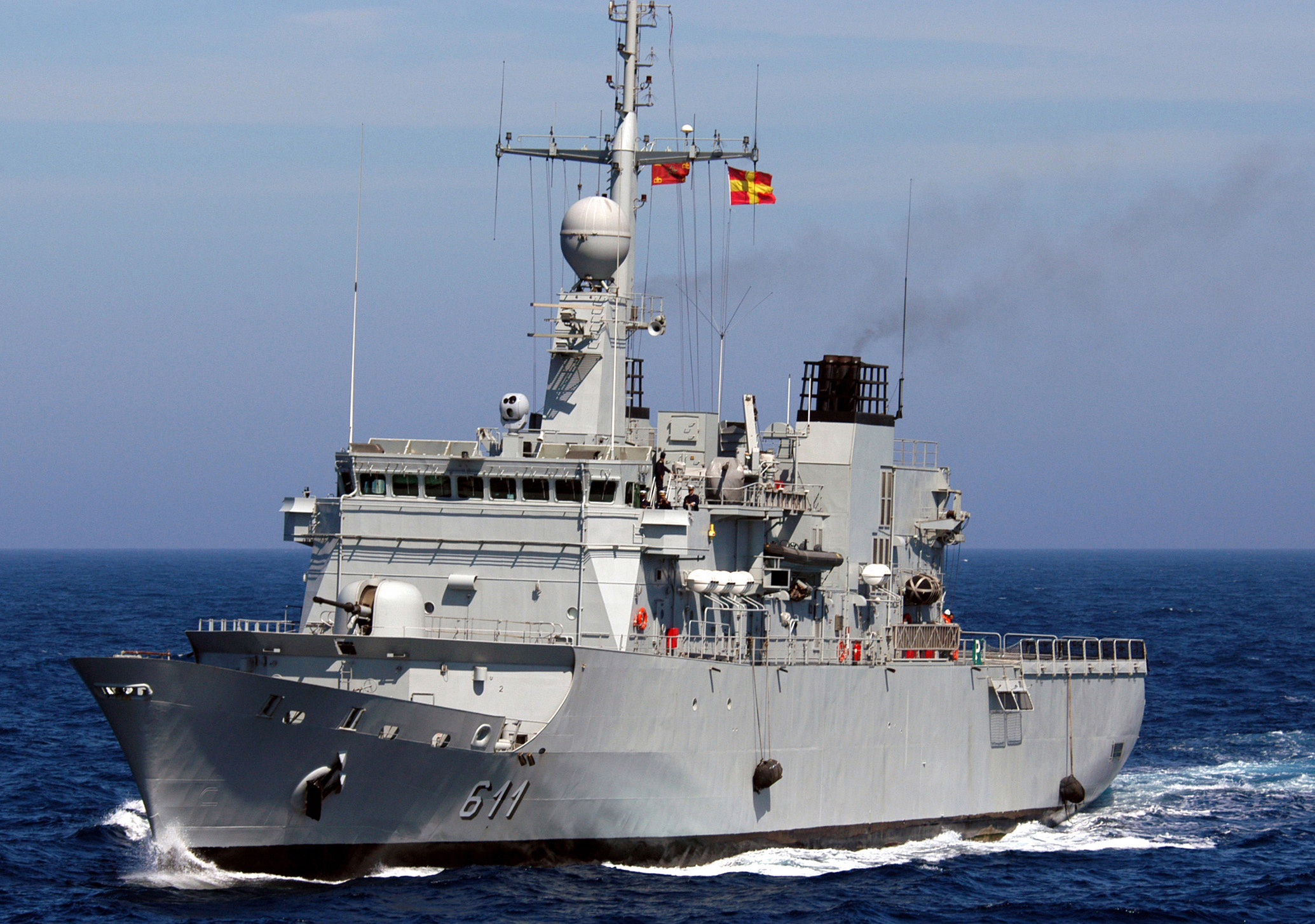
Royal Moroccan Navy Mohammed V

The Royal Moroccan Navy operates two Floréal-class frigates, Mohammed V and Hassan II. The two frigates are named after the late Kings Mohammed V and Hassan II. They were acquired with three Panther helicopters in July 1999. The Moroccan frigates of the class are similar to those in French service with a few changes. The frigates are powered by a CODAD system comprising the same four SEMT Pielstick 6 PA6 L280 BPC diesel engines driving two shafts each turning a LIPS controllable pitch propeller. The CODAD system is rated at 7,200 kilowatts (9,600 hp) The vessels are also equipped with one 250-kilowatt (340 hp) bow thruster. Other differences include one Otobreda 76 mm (3 in) gun turret with Najir fire control system located forwards instead of the French 100 mm gun. The frigates are capable of being armed with two 20 mm modèle F2 guns situated in atop the aft superstructure, but did not come with the weapons installed. In place of the 20 mm (0.8 in) guns, the Moroccan Floréal-class frigates can be fitted with twin launchers for Simbad surface-to-air missiles. The Moroccan frigates are equipped with two Decca Bridgemaster radars, one for use as navigational radar, the other for helicopter control, and Thomsen-CSF ARBR 17 radar intercept electronic surveillance system.

==== Ships in class ====
Construction data
Pennant no.	Name	Builder	Laid down	Launched	Commissioned	Status
611	Mohammed V	Chantiers de l'Atlantique, Saint-Nazaire, France	June 1999	9 March 2001	12 March 2002	In service
612	Hassan II	Chantiers de l'Atlantique, Saint-Nazaire, France	December 1999	11 February 2002	20 December 2002	In service

=== Philippines ===
STX France revealed a modernized variant of the Floréal class that it offered to the Philippine Navy in 2014.

== See also ==
- List of naval ship classes in service
- Nordkapp-class offshore patrol vessel
