= BAP Almirante Guise =

At least four ships of the Peruvian Navy have been named BAP Almirante Guise or simply Guise:

- BAP Almirante Guise (1933) was an Izyaslav-class destroyer launched in 1915 as the Russian ship Avtroil and served with the Estonian navy as EML Lennuk from 1918. She was purchased by Peru in 1933 serving until being scrapped in 1954
- BAP Almirante Guise (DD-72) was a Fletcher-class destroyer launched in 1942 as USS Isherwood, she was transferred to Peru in 1961 and scrapped in 1981
- BAP Guise (DD-72) was a Friesland-class destroyer launched in 1955 as HNLMS Drenthe, she was transferred to Peru in 1981 and decommissioned in 1985
- BAP Guise (CC-28) is a Pohang-class corvette launched in 1987 as ROKS Suncheon, she was transferred to Peru in 2021
