= French ship Tonnerre (L9014) =

French amphibious assault ship

- French Navy amphibious assault helicopter carrier Tonnerre (L9014) on a port call in Marseille on 05/10/2026

History

France
- Name: Tonnerre
- Namesake: "Thunder"
- Builder: Arsenal de Brest, Chantiers de Saint-Nazaire
- Laid down: 26 August 2003 (aft section at Brest); 5 May 2004 (bow section at Saint-Nazaire)
- Launched: 26 July 2005
- Commissioned: December 2006
- Home port: Toulon
- Identification: Pennant number: L 9014; MMSI number: 278710000; Deck Code: TO
- Status: In service

General characteristics
- Class & type: Mistral-class amphibious assault ship
- Displacement: 16,500 t (empty); 21,300 t (full load); 32,300 t (with ballast)
- Length: 199 m (653 ft)
- Beam: 32 m (105 ft)
- Draught: 6.3 m (21 ft)
- Propulsion: Motorisation : 2 Mermaïd electric motors (2 × 7 MW); 2 5-bladed propellers; Electrical plant: 4 Wärtsilä diesels-alternators 16 V32 (6,2 MW) + 1 Wärtsilä Vasaa auxiliary diesel-alternator 18V200 (3 MW)
- Speed: 18.8 kn (34.8 km/h; 21.6 mph)
- Range: 10,800 km (6,700 mi) at 18 kn (33 km/h; 21 mph); 19,800 km (12,300 mi) at 15 kn (28 km/h; 17 mph)
- Capacity: 2 barges, one Leclerc battalion, 70 vehicles
- Complement: 20 officers, 80 petty officers, 60 Quarter-masters, 450 passengers (900 for a short cruise), 150 men for an onboard headquarters
- Armament: 2 Simbad systems; 2 30 mm Breda-Mauser (not installed); 4 12.7 mm M2-HB Browning machine guns
- Aircraft carried: 16 heavy or 35 light helicopters

Tonnerre (L9014; lit. Thunder) is an amphibious assault helicopter carrier of the Marine Nationale. She is the eighth vessel to bear the name and the second ship in the Mistral-class amphibious assault ship series.

== Construction and career ==
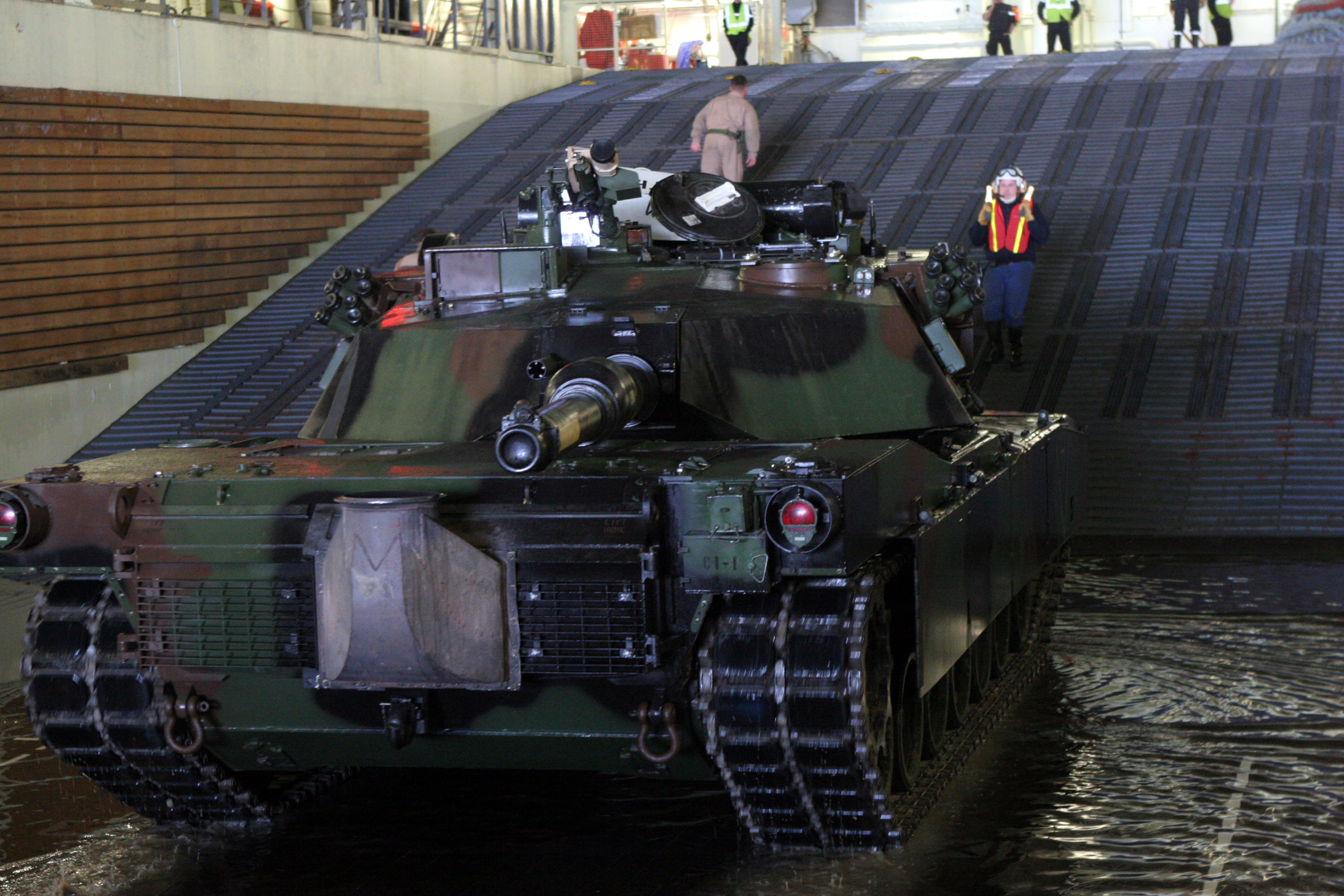
US M1 Abrams enters Tonnerre off the coast of North Carolina

Tonnerre was laid down in two parts. On 26 August 2003, the aft section was laid down by Arsenal de Brest at Brest and the bow section was laid down 5 May 2004 by Chantiers de Saint-Nazaire at Saint-Nazaire. The vessel was launched on 26 July 2005 and began active service in December 2006.

Tonnerre's maiden voyage occurred between 10 April and 24 July 2007. During this voyage, Tonnerre was involved in Opération Licorne, the French co-deploying complement to the United Nations Operation in Côte d'Ivoire following the Ivorian Civil War. Gazelle and Cougar helicopters of the French Air Force operated from the ship beginning on 9 July.

At the start of 2008, Tonnerre was involved in the Corymbe 92 mission (see Standing French Navy Deployments), a humanitarian mission in the Gulf of Guinea. During this deployment, Tonnerre acted on tip-offs from the European Maritime Analysis Operation Centre – Narcotics, and intercepted 5.7 tonnes (5.6 long tons; 6.3 short tons) of smuggled cocaine: 2.5 t (2.5 long tons; 2.8 short tons) from a fishing vessel 520 kilometres (280 nmi) from Monrovia on 29 January, and 3.2 t (3.1 long tons; 3.5 short tons) from a cargo ship 300 kilometres (160 nmi) off Conakry.

In May 2011, the French Military deployed Tiger and Gazelle helicopters on the ship to augment forces engaged in Opération Harmattan and later Operation Unified Protector during the Libyan Civil War. along with allied ships such as the British helicopter carrier HMS Ocean which also provided its own attack helicopters.

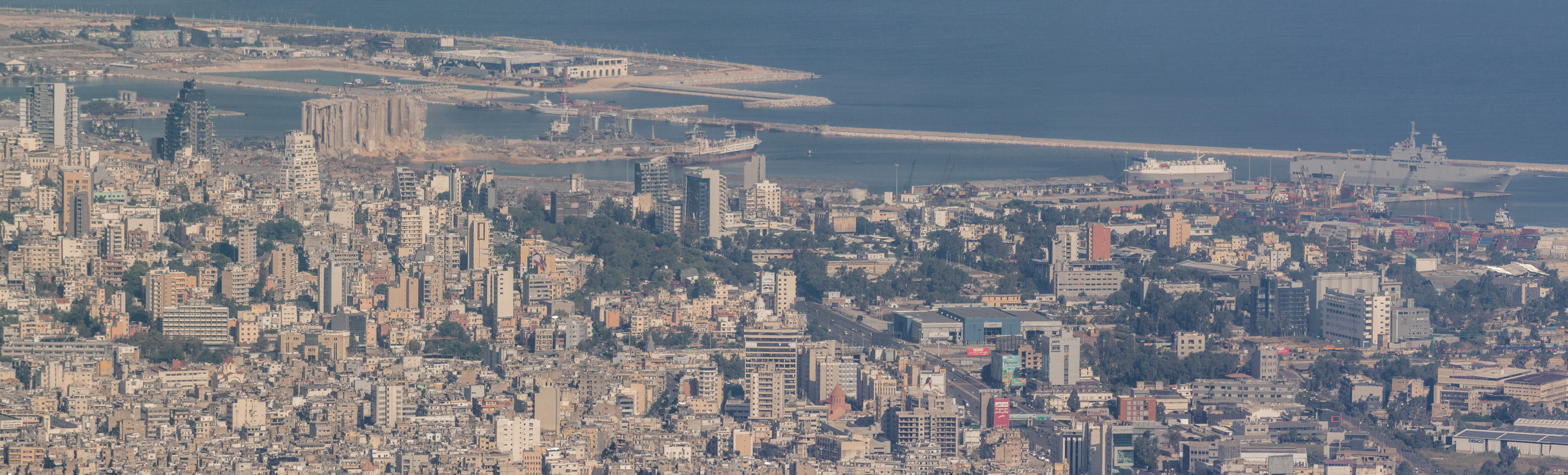
Tonnerre (right) providing support at Port of Beirut on 15 August 2020

In 2020, Tonnerre was deployed to Beirut, Lebanon, shortly after an ammonium nitrate explosion at the city's port killed roughly 200 people and caused significant destruction, including the loss of the nation's main grain elevator. The ship arrived in Beirut on 13 August with "75,000 army rations, large quantities of flour, [and] medical supplies", as well as fire trucks and construction materials. Around 350 personnel were to join the clean-up efforts around the port, which was expected to take weeks.

In 2021, Tonnerre deployed to the Pacific accompanied by the frigate Surcouf, to conduct the joint La Perouse naval exercise with the four Quadrilateral Security Dialogue members participating. From 18 November to 2 December 2021, Tonnerre took part in Exercise Polaris 21 in the western Mediterranean Sea. In late 2022 she operated with the frigate Germinal in anti-piracy operations in the Gulf of Guinea.

In October 2023 Tonnerre was deployed as a hospital ship to the Eastern Mediterranean during the Gaza war, joining the frigates Alsace and Surcouf which were also deployed to the region.

In 2024, Tonnerre, accompanied by the frigate Guépratte, was tasked to undertake a prolonged deployment circumventing South America and also visiting North America. As part of her deployment, the ship was to embark 162 officer cadets and a French Army detachment including two Gazelle helicopters, two light (armoured) cavalry platoons, one section from the 2nd Marine Infantry Regiment as well as other elements including some 40 vehicles among them the VBMR Griffon.

== See also ==
- List of ship launches in 2005
