= 20 mm modèle F2 gun =

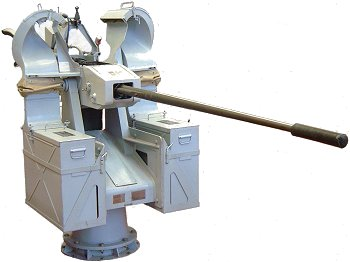
- Type: Autocannon
- Place of origin: France

Specifications
- Mass: 332 kg (732 lb) (without ammunition)
- Length: 2,600 mm (100 in)
- Barrel length: 1,970 mm (78 in)
- Caliber: 20×139mm
- Action: Gas unlocked, delayed blowback
- Elevation: −15° to + 65°
- Rate of fire: 900 round/min
- Muzzle velocity: 1,050 m/s (3,400 ft/s)
- Effective firing range: 1,500 m (4,900 ft) against aerial targets

The 20 mm modèle F2 gun is a naval defence weapon used by the French Navy. It was developed from the GIAT M693, itself derived from Hispano-Suiza HS.820. It fires the same 20×139 mm round.

== History ==
The need for a newer 20 mm defence cannon than the Oerlikon 20 mm cannon began to grow noticeably during the 1980s. The companies DCN and GIAT were contracted to design the F2 20 mm cannon, essentially a navalised version of the M693 gun used by the French Army, and sold for export.

== Description ==
The 20 mm F2 is a mounted monotube gun, with two 150-cartridge boxes on each side of the piece. An electrical control system allows for a choice of three modes of fire: single shot, eight-shot burst, or free fire. There is an electrical trigger in the right hand of the gunner. A manual selector allows the gunner to change the box feeding the weapon during the firing, making mixed firing available. After each shot, the empty cartridge is ejected from beneath the weapon.

The gun is manoeuvred by the body of the gunner, who is attached to the weapon. Firing is guided through the same optical visor as used with the Bofors 40 mm gun and the Oerlikon 20 mm cannon.

== Usage ==
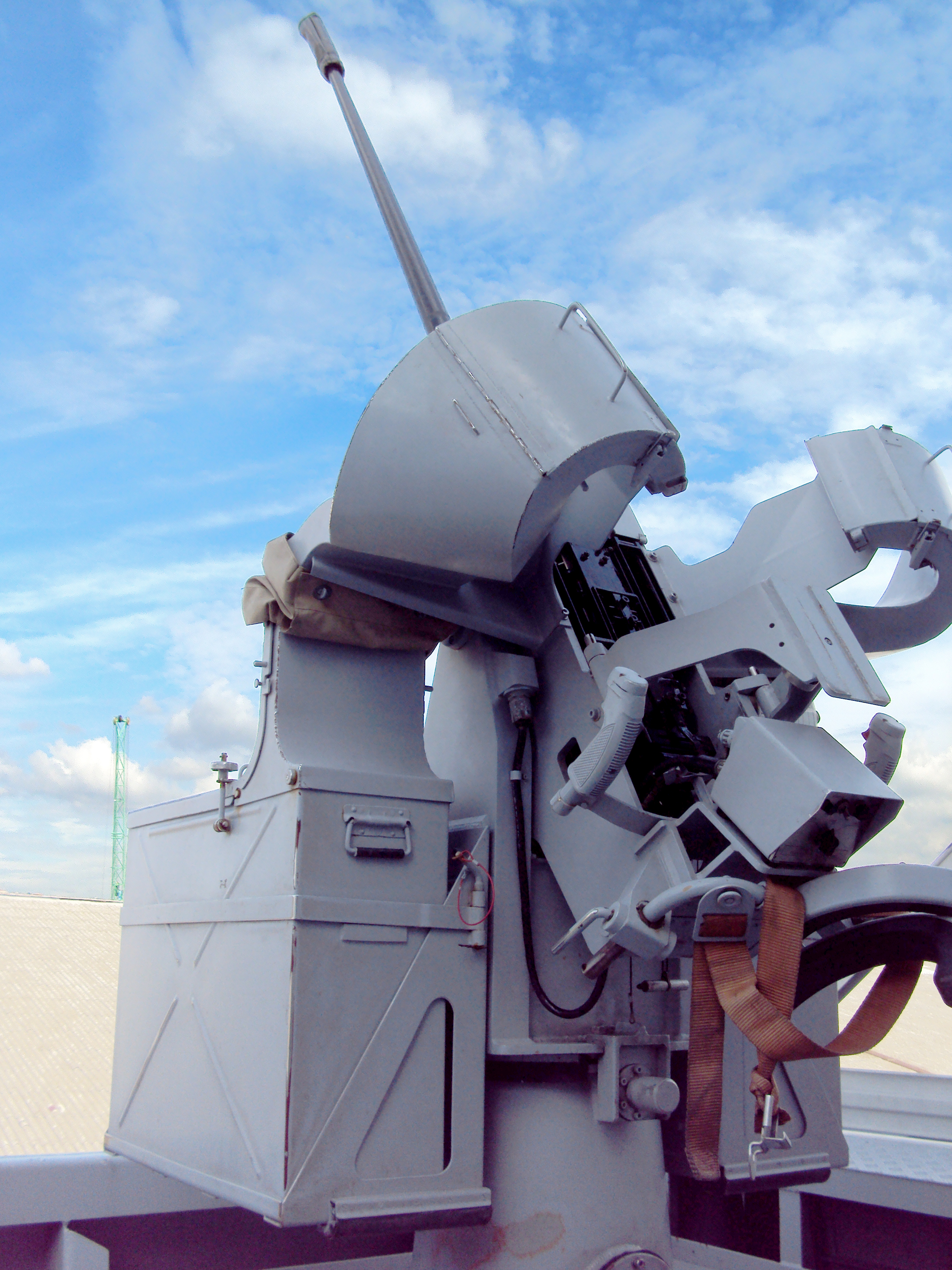
F2 gun aboard Forbin

The gun has been exported to Belgium (Tripartite-class minesweepers), Indonesia (Tripartite-class minesweepers), Malawi (Kasunga), Netherlands (Tripartite-class minesweepers), Pakistan (Tripartite-class minesweepers), and Saudi Arabia (NAJA 12 class).

In the French Navy, they are used aboard:

- French aircraft carrier Charles de Gaulle
- Horizon-class frigates
- La Fayette-class frigates
- Floréal-class frigates
- D'Estienne d'Orves-class avisos
- Éridan-class minesweepers
- P400-class patrol vessel
- Dumont d'Urville
- Jacques Cartier
- La Grandière
- Rapière
- Hallebarde
- Monge
