= Westland Sea King =

Military helicopter, 1969-present

WS-61 Sea King Commando
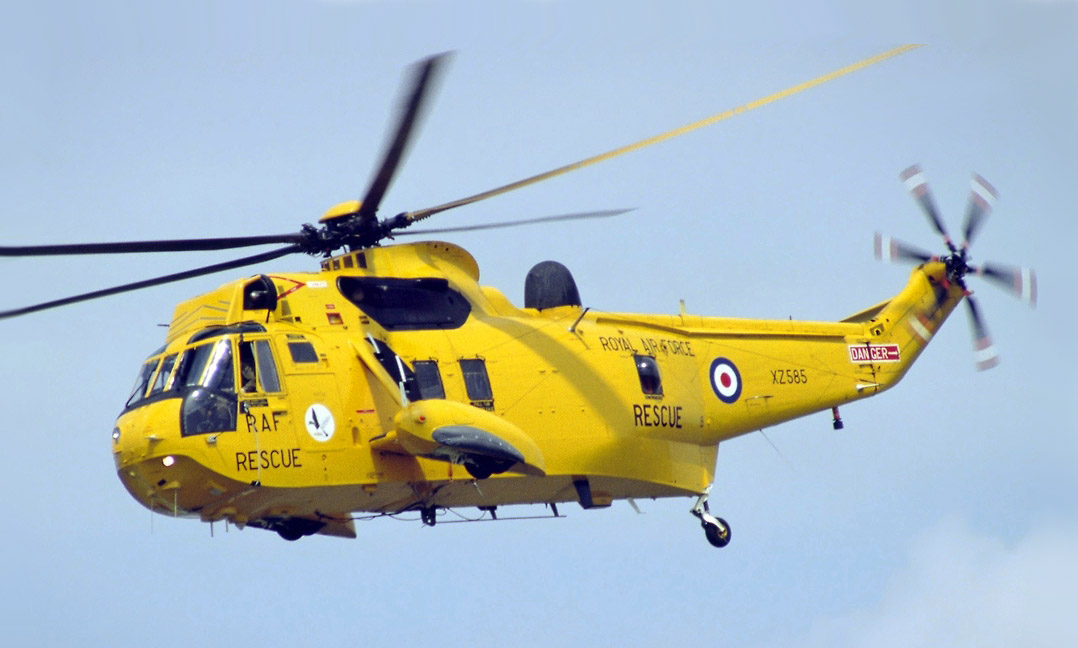
- Royal Air Force Sea King HAR3

General information
- Type: Anti-submarine warfare, medium-lift transport and utility helicopter
- Manufacturer: Westland Helicopters
- Status: Active service
- Primary users: Royal Navy (Retired): Royal Air Force (Retired); German Navy (Retired); Indian Navy
- Number built: 344 (Westland Sea King) / 13 (Westland Sea King AEW Mk.2/ASac MK.7 variant)

History
- Manufactured: 1969–1995
- First flight: Sea King: 7 May 1969; Commando: 26 September 1979
- Developed from: Sikorsky SH-3 Sea King

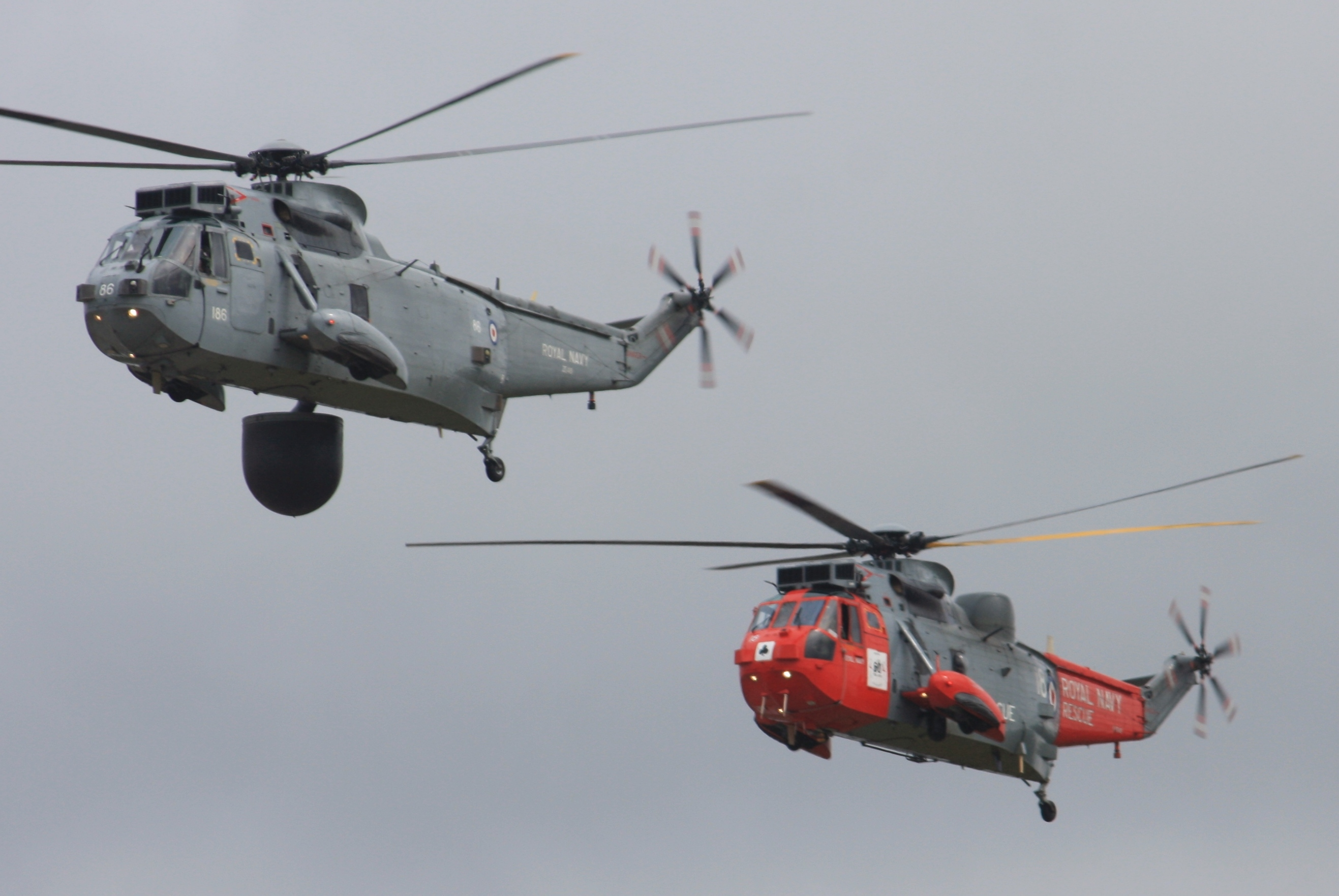
The AEW version (ASaC7) with radar down, and a Search and Rescue version together in flight, 2013

The Westland WS-61 Sea King is a British licence-built version of the American Sikorsky S-61 helicopter of the same name, built by Westland Helicopters. The aircraft differs considerably from the American version, with Rolls-Royce Gnome engines (derived from the US General Electric T58), British-made anti-submarine warfare systems and a fully computerised flight control system. The Sea King was primarily designed for performing anti-submarine warfare (ASW) missions. A Sea King variant known as the Commando was developed by Westland to serve as a troop transport.

In British service, the Westland Sea King provided a wide range of services in both the Royal Navy and the Royal Air Force. As well as wartime roles in the Falklands War, the Gulf War, the Bosnian War, the Iraq War and the Afghanistan War, it was used as a Royal Navy Search and Rescue (red and grey livery) and RAF Search and Rescue Force (yellow livery) helicopter. The Sea King was also adapted to meet the Royal Navy's requirement for a ship-based airborne early warning platform.

On 26 September 2018, the last remaining Sea King variant in Royal Navy service was retired. Many operators have replaced, or are planning to replace, the Sea King with new helicopters, such as the NHIndustries NH90, SH-60 Seahawk, and the AgustaWestland AW101. Germany retired the type in March 2024; however, it is still in widespread service around the globe, including India and several Middle Eastern countries.

== Design and development ==
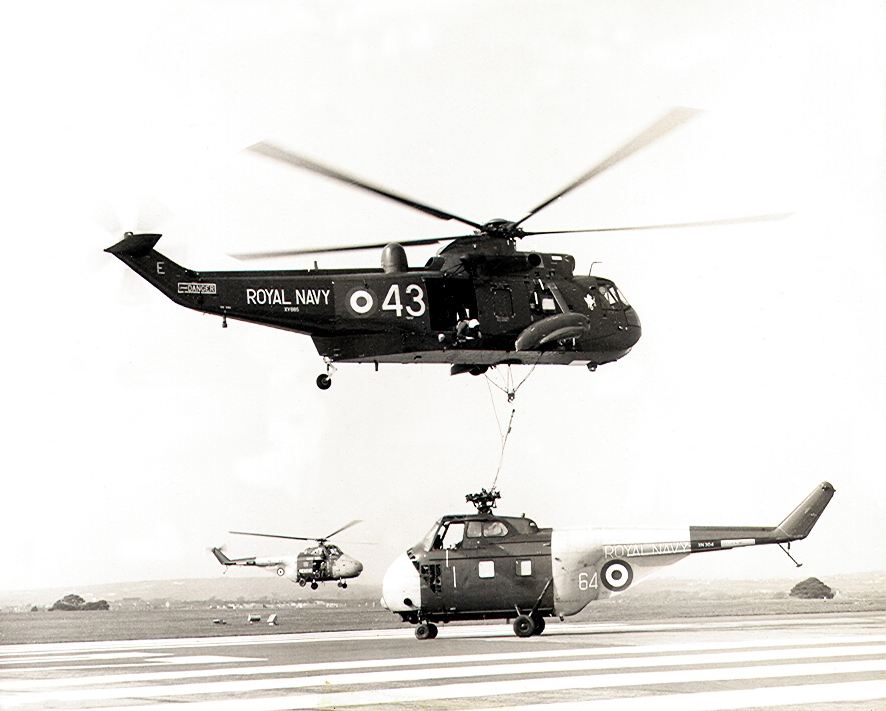
Westland Sea King HAS.1 air-lifting a Westland Whirlwind HAS.7 near RNAS Culdrose, 1971

=== Origins ===
Westland Helicopters, which had a long-standing licence agreement with Sikorsky Aircraft to allow it to build Sikorsky's helicopters, extended the agreement to cover the Sikorsky SH-3 Sea King soon after the Sea King's first flight in 1959. Westland proceeded to independently develop the Sea King, integrating a significant proportion of components from British suppliers; key changes include the use of a pair of Rolls-Royce Gnome turboshaft engines and the implementation of an automatic flight control system. On this matter, authors Jim Thorn and Gerald Frawley stated that: "Despite appearances, Westland's Sea King [is a] very different aircraft from Sikorsky's". Many of the differences between the Westland-built Sea King and the original helicopter were as a result of differing operational doctrine. While the U.S. Navy Sea Kings were intended to be under tactical control of the carrier from which they operated, the Royal Navy intended its helicopters to be much more autonomous, capable of operating alone, or co-ordinating with other aircraft or surface vessels. This resulted in a different crew arrangement, with operations being controlled by an observer rather than the pilot, as well as fitting a search radar.

The Royal Navy selected the Sea King to meet a requirement for an anti-submarine warfare (ASW) helicopter to replace the Westland Wessex, placing an order with Westland for 60 SH-3D Sea Kings in June 1966. The prototype and three pre-production aircraft were built by Sikorsky at Stratford, Connecticut and shipped to the United Kingdom to act as trials and pattern aircraft. The first of the SH-3Ds was initially fitted with General Electric T58s and, after being shipped from the United States, was flown in October 1966 from the dockside at Avonmouth to Yeovil airfield. The other three were delivered from the docks, by road to Yeovil, for completion with British systems and Rolls-Royce Gnome engines. The first Westland-built helicopter, designated Sea King HAS1, flew on 7 May 1969 at Yeovil. The first two helicopters were used for trials and evaluation by Westland and the Aeroplane and Armament Experimental Establishment; subsequent production Sea Kings were delivered to the Royal Navy's 700 Naval Air Squadron from August 1969 onwards.

By 1979, the Royal Navy had ordered 56 HAS1s and 21 HAS2s to meet the anti-submarine requirements, these were also configured for the secondary anti-ship role. The Westland Sea King was updated and adapted for numerous roles, subsequent variants include the HAS2, HAS5 and HAS6. Changes from initial production aircraft included an expansion of the cabin and upgraded engines.

=== Commando and further developments ===
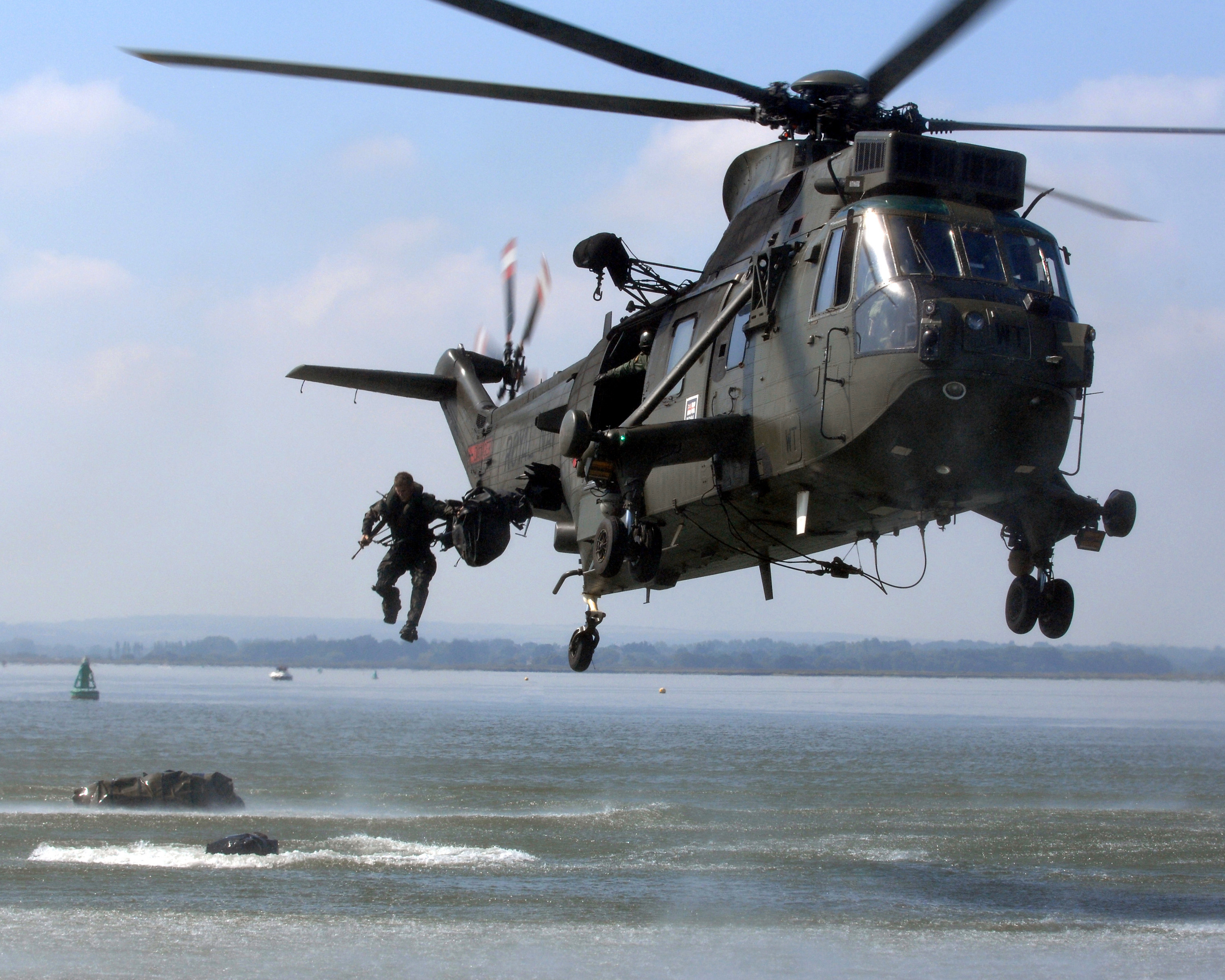
Westland HC4 on exercises, 2007

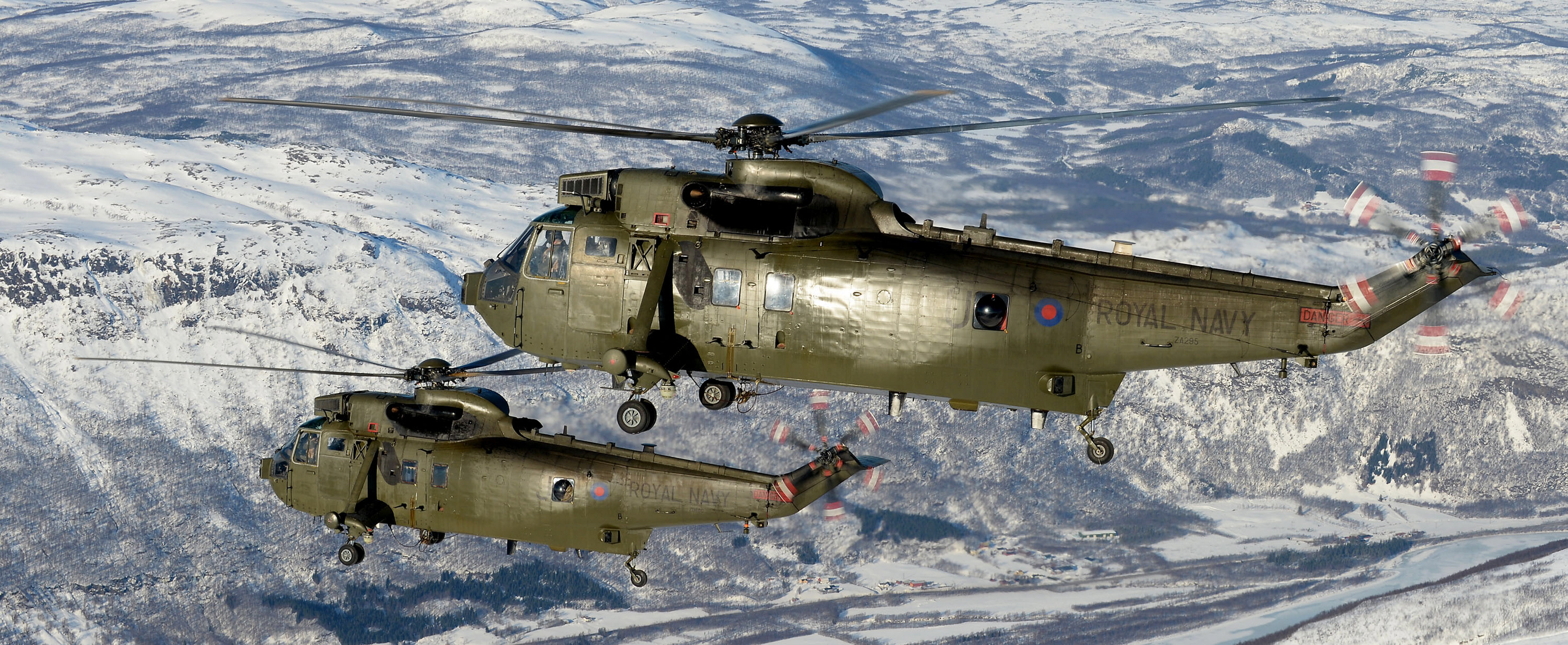
Two HC4 in northern Norway, 2014

One of the most extensively modified variants was the Westland Commando, operated by the Royal Navy as the HC4. The Commando had capacity for up to 28 fully equipped troops and had originally been developed to meet an Egyptian Air Force requirement. Due to the deletion of the amphibious capability, not required in the Egyptian desert, the most noticeable change from the Sea King was the deletion of the side floats, the main undercarriage being carried on stub sponsons. An improved variant of the Egyptian Commando, with changes including the fitting of folding blades common to the ASW variants, was designated as the Sea King HC4 by the Royal Navy and all the aircraft were new build. First flying on 26 September 1979, due to its operational range of up to 600 nautical miles without refuelling, the HC4 'Commando' became an important asset for amphibious warfare and troop transport duties, in particular. Several Royal Naval Air Squadrons have operated the Commando variant, such as 845 Naval Air Squadron, 846 Naval Air Squadron and 848 Naval Air Squadron. In British service, the Sea King HC4 was deployed on operations in the Falklands, the Balkans, both Gulf Wars, Sierra Leone, Lebanon and Afghanistan. Towards the end of the Sea King's operational life, several HAS6s were repurposed by the removal of the ASW equipment, as troop transports. In 2010, the last of the UK's converted ASW Sea Kings to troop transports were retired.

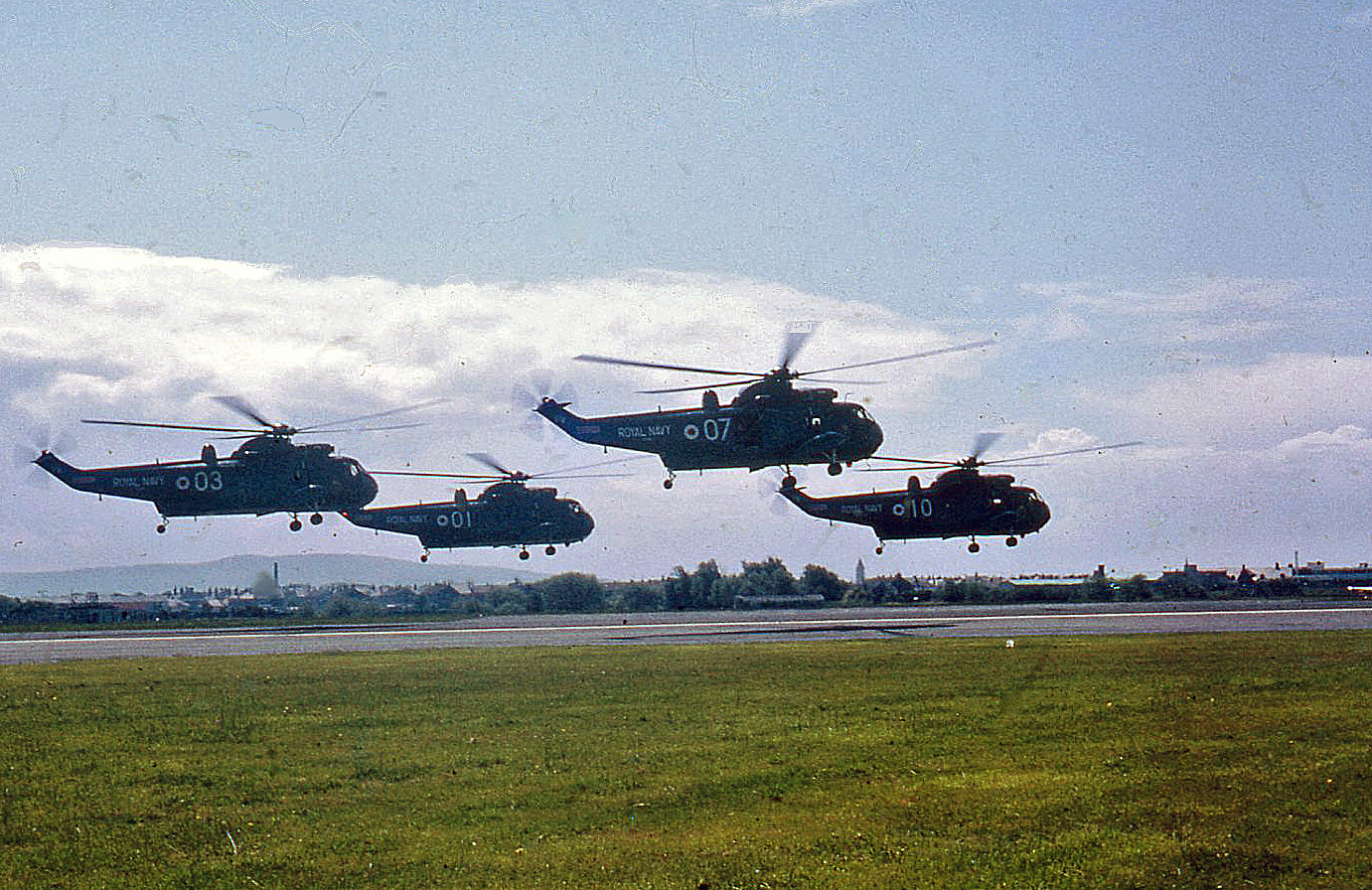
A formation of four Sea Kings hovering close to the ground, Prestwick, 1972

In the 1970s, Westland's experience with the Sea King led the company to conduct the British Experimental Rotor Program (BERP), in coordination with the Royal Aircraft Establishment, which applied innovations in composite materials and new design principles to the helicopter rotor. Initial trials carried out with active Sea Kings found several advantages to the BERP rotor, including a longer fatigue life and improved aerodynamic characteristics. Subsequent Westland helicopters, such as the record-breaking Lynx and the AgustaWestland AW101 Merlin, took advantage of BERP rotors for greater performance. Westland equipped later-built Sea Kings with the new composite rotors as well.

Westland has produced a total of 330 Sea Kings; export customers include the Indian Naval Air Arm, the German Navy, the Royal Australian Navy, and the Royal Norwegian Air Force. The last of the Royal Navy's Sea Kings in the ASW role was retired in 2003, being replaced by the AgustaWestland Merlin HM1. The Sea King Airborne Surveillance and Control (ASaC) variant is expected to be replaced around the introduction of the two Queen Elizabeth-class aircraft carriers. The UK has also planned to retire the HC4 and search and rescue variants in March 2016.

=== Search and rescue ===
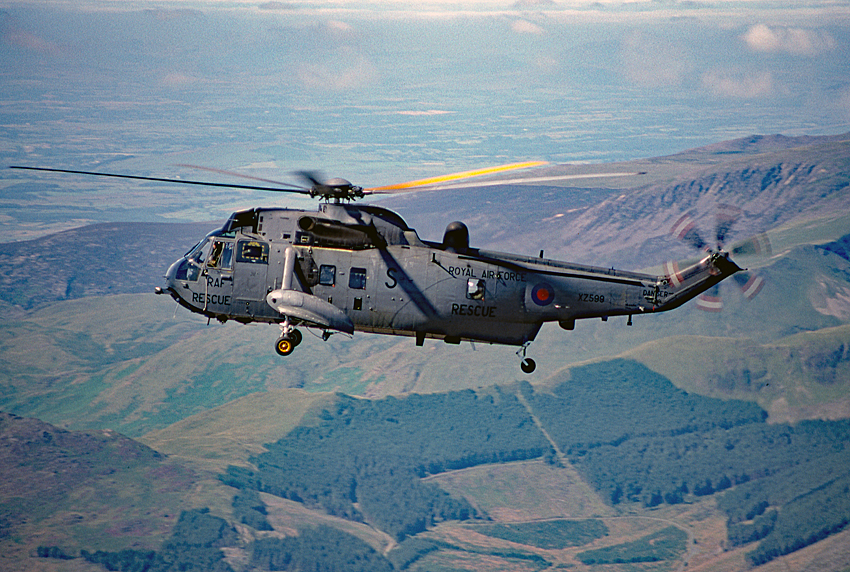
RAF Sea King HAR3 over Mount Snowdon, 1989

A dedicated search and rescue (SAR) version, the HAR3, was developed for the RAF Search and Rescue Force. The type entered service in 1978 to replace the Westland Whirlwind HAR.10. A 16th helicopter was ordered shortly after, and following the Falklands War of 1982, three more were purchased to enable operation of a SAR flight in the islands, initially from Navy Point on the north side of Stanley harbour, and later from RAF Mount Pleasant. In 1992, six further helicopters were ordered to replace the last remaining Westland Wessex helicopters in the SAR role, entering service in 1996. However, teething problems resulted in the actual operational use of the HAR3A's being delayed until mid 1997. The six Sea King HAR3As featured updated systems, including a digital navigation system and more modern avionics.

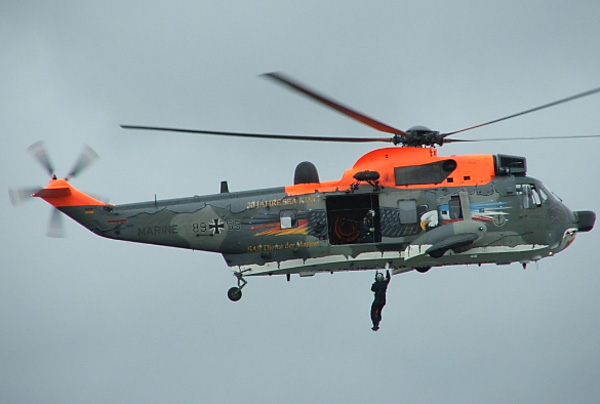
German SAR Sea King during an operation, 2005

Westland also manufactured SAR versions of the Sea King for the Royal Norwegian Air Force, the German Navy and the Belgian Air Force. On SAR variants, the cabin was enlarged by a stretch of the fuselage behind the door; another key feature, used for additional flotation in the unusual event of a water landing, inflatable buoyancy bags were housed inside the aircraft's sponsons. Upgrades and changes made to SAR Sea Kings include the addition of radar warning receivers, a cargo hook for the underslung carriage of goods, and the redesigning of the cockpit for compatibility with night vision goggles.

As of 2006, up to 12 HAR3/3As were dispersed across the UK, a further two HAR3s were attached to the Falkland Islands, providing 24-hour rescue coverage. Some Royal Navy HAS5 ASW variants were adapted for the SAR role and served with 771 Naval Air Squadron, Culdrose and HMS Gannet SAR Flight at Prestwick Airport in Scotland. They were expected to remain in service until 2016, being replaced with civilian operated SAR rotorcraft. Both Andrew Mountbatten-Windsor (formerly Prince Andrew) and William, Prince of Wales have flown SAR Sea Kings in front-line roles.

=== Airborne early warning ===
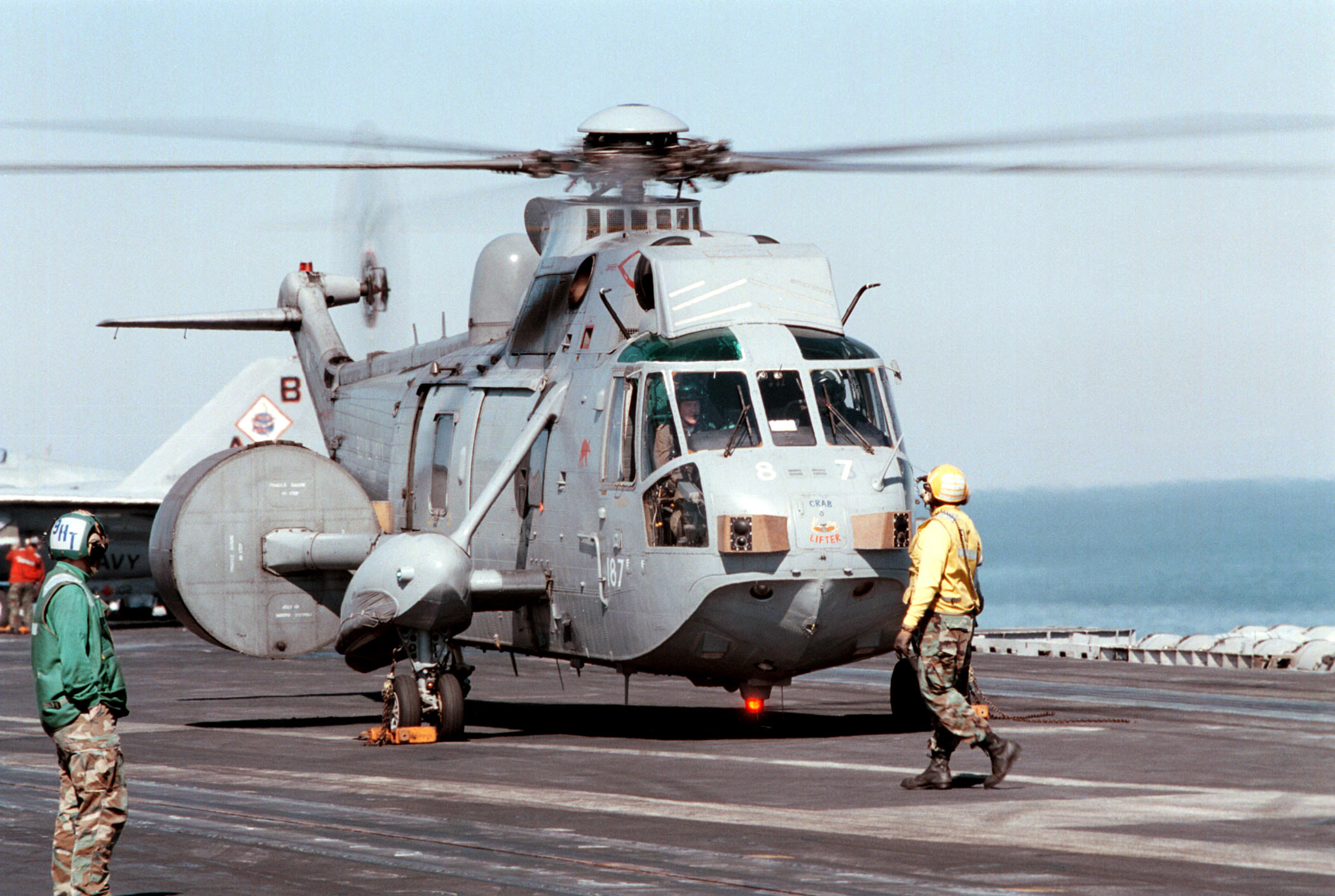
Royal Navy Sea King AEW2A in 1998

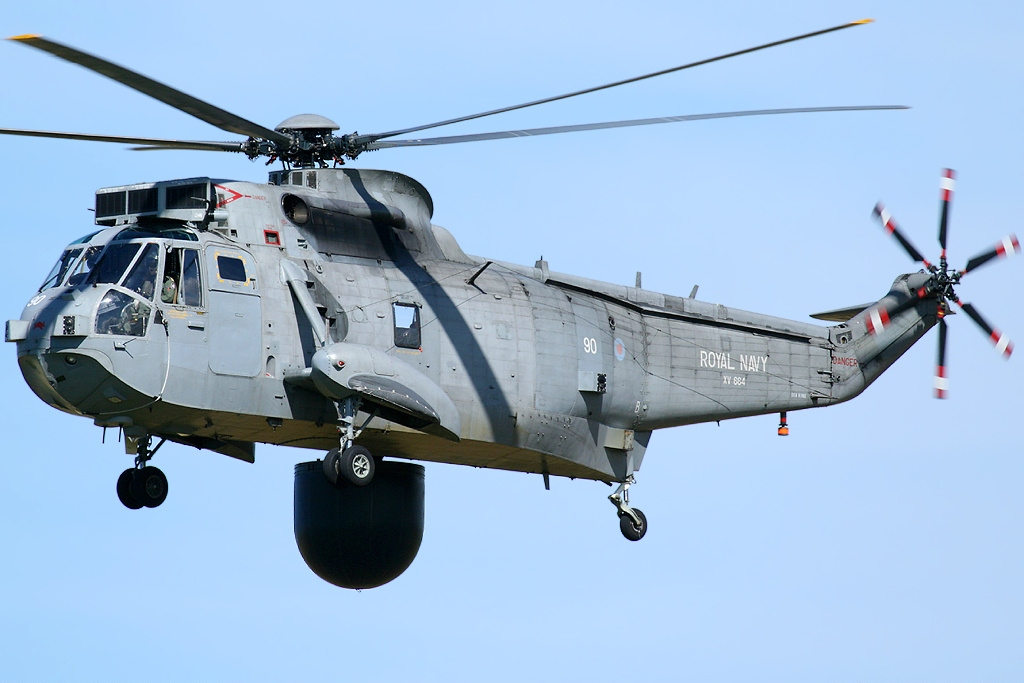
RAN Sea King in flight, with the radar in position

The Royal Navy's airborne early warning (AEW) capability had been lost when the Fairey Gannet aeroplane was withdrawn after the last of the RN's fleet carriers was decommissioned in 1978. During the Falklands War, a number of warships were lost and casualties suffered due to the lack of an AEW platform. The proposed fleet cover by the RAF Shackleton AEW.2 was too unresponsive and at too great a distance to be practical. Consequently, two Sea King HAS2s were modified in 1982 with the addition of the Thorn-EMI ARI 5980/3 Searchwater LAST radar attached to the fuselage on a swivel arm and protected by an inflatable dome. This allowed the radar to be lowered below the fuselage during flight and for it to be raised for landing. These prototypes, designated HAS2(AEW), were both flying within 11 weeks and deployed with 824 "D" Flight on HMS Illustrious, serving in the Falklands after the cessation of hostilities. A further eight HAS2s were modified to a production standard, known as the AEW2. Two remained "fitted for but not with". These entered operational service in 1985, being deployed by 849 Naval Air Squadron. Three Sea King HAS5/6s were later converted as part of the ASaC Mk7 programme, bringing the Mk7 fleet to 13; still 3 below the requirement.

The upgrade programme resulted in the Sea King AEW fleet being upgraded with a new mission system, Comms, NavAids, JTIDS, Active Noise Reduction and Videographic recording. The Mission System Upgrade (MSU) component (Radar and partial JTIDS integration) was based around the improved Searchwater 2000AEW radar, with an all-new Man-Machine Interface. This MSU component was later termed "Project Cerberus" by Thales, after successful integration was conducted by Westland and GEC-Marconi. This variant was initially referred to as the Sea King AEW7, but renamed ASaC7 (Airborne Surveillance and Control Mk.7) just before In Service Date. The main role of the Sea King ASaC7 is detection of low-flying attack aircraft; it also provides interception/attack control and over-the-horizon targeting for surface-launched weapon systems. In comparison to older versions, the new radar enables the ASaC7 to simultaneously track up to 400 targets, instead of an earlier limit of 250 targets. The effectiveness of the AEW7 was greatly increased via the addition of a Link 16 data link, allowing gathered radar information to be analysed and rapidly put to use by multiple allied platforms in range.

The ASaC7s remained in service until they were replaced under the "Crowsnest" programme; intended as a podded capability onboard Merlins. Previous proposed replacement programmes - Future Organic Airborne Early Warning (FOAEW) and MASC (Maritime Airborne Surveillance and Control) - were initiated and then cancelled, due largely to the erroneous assumption that the entire ASaC Mk7 system could simply be lifted and plugged into another aircraft type. However, as a result of the time gap between the planned out of service date of the Sea King in 2016, and the introduction of "Crowsnest", seven Sea King ASaC.7 helicopters remained in service with the RN through to the second half of 2018.

The last Sea Kings were retired in September 2018, marking almost half a century of service, with the last three taking a ceremonial flight before retirement.

== Operational history ==
=== United Kingdom ===
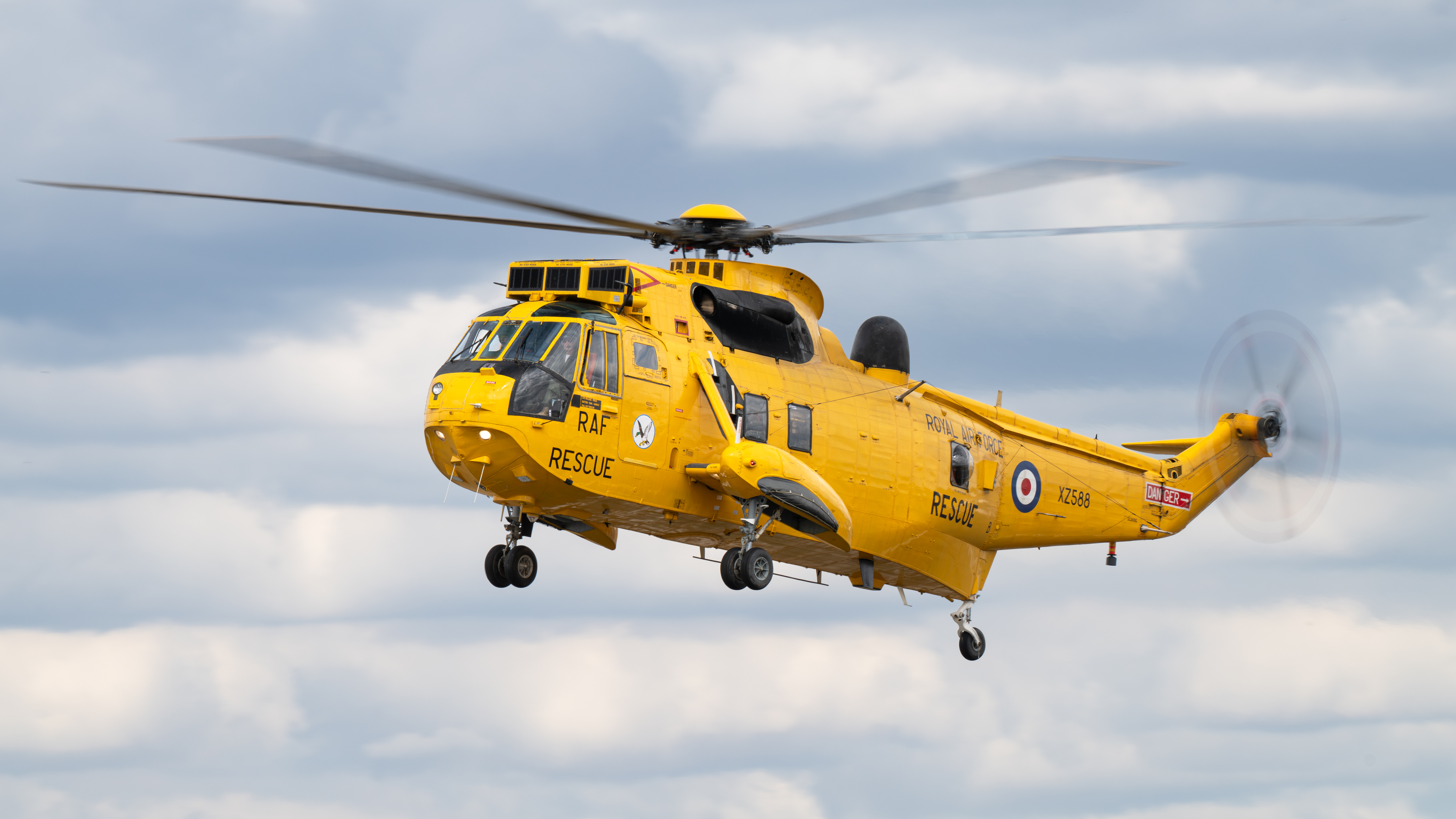
Royal Air Force Sea King in 2025

==== Falklands Conflict ====
A number of Sea Kings were deployed during the Falklands Conflict. They were transported to the combat zone and operated from the decks of various ships of the Royal Navy, such as the landing platform dock HMS Fearless. In the theatre, they performed a wide range of missions, from anti-submarine patrols and reconnaissance flights to replenishment operations and the insertion of special forces. Support provided by the Sea Kings in the form of transport for men and supplies has been viewed as vital to the success of the British operation. Sea Kings also protected the fleet by acting as decoys against incoming Exocet missiles, with some missions being flown by the former Prince Andrew.

Anti-Submarine Sea Kings of 820 Naval Air Squadron were embarked in HMS Invincible. With 11 HAS.5s, the squadron operated anti-submarine and search and rescue sorties with one helicopter always airborne on surface search duties. On 14 June, an 820 NAS Sea King HAS.5 was used to transport Major General Jeremy Moore to Port Stanley to accept the surrender of Argentine troops on the island. The squadron flew 1,650 sorties during the war. A Flight of 824 Naval Air Squadron embarked two Sea King HAS.2As aboard RFA Olmeda and were used to move supplies to other ships on the way south and later anti-submarine patrols. C Flight had three Sea King HAS.2As on board RFA Fort Grange which were used for replenishment duties, supplying over 2,000 tons of stores.

825 Naval Air Squadron was formed for the war with 10 Sea King HAS.2s modified as utility variants to support ground forces. The anti-submarine equipment was removed and the helicopters fitted with troop seats. Two aircraft embarked in Queen Elizabeth 2 and were later used for moving troops from QE2 to other ships, the remainder embarked in Atlantic Causeway and were used for troop movements around the islands. Embarked in HMS Hermes was 826 Naval Air Squadron with nine HAS.5s, which carried out continuous anti-submarine sorties. From the departure of Hermes from Ascension in April until the Argentine surrender, the squadron operated at least three helicopters airborne continuously for fleet protection.

On 23 April 1982, a Sea King HC4 was ditched while performing a risky transfer of supplies to a ship at night, operating from the flagship HMS Hermes. On 12 May, a Sea King operating from Hermes crashed into the sea due to an altimeter problem; all crew were rescued. On 19 May 1982 a Sea King, in the process of transporting SAS troops to HMS Intrepid from Hermes, crashed into the sea while attempting to land on Intrepid. Twenty-two men were killed and nine survived. Bird feathers were found in the debris, suggesting a bird strike, although investigations of the cause of the accident proved to be inconclusive. The SAS lost 18 men in the crash, their highest number of casualties on one day since the Second World War. The Royal Signals lost one man and the RAF one man.

==== Gulf War ====
During the 1991 Gulf War Sea Kings from several nations, including Canada, Britain, and the U.S., were present in the coalition forces against Saddam Hussein's Iraq regime. Due to the threat of potential use of any Iraqi weapons of mass destruction, it was standard practice for Sea King crews to wear fully enclosed NBC (nuclear, biological, chemical) protective suits. Britain's Sea Kings primarily engaged in inter-ship transport duties, including ferrying troops between the fleet and land. Six Sea King Mk4 helicopters from 845 Naval Air Squadron and six of 848 Squadron, which had been reformed to meet this operational demand, worked in support of the ground advance. There was thorough radar coverage by U.S. airborne early warning and control (AWACS) aircraft; British AEW Sea Kings were not deployed.

Following the end of hostilities, the available Sea Kings remained on deployment in the region to conduct transport missions to relocate people displaced by the conflict to refugee camps and repatriate citizens to their home countries.

==== Balkans ====
The Sea King participated in the UN and NATO intervention in Bosnia and Herzegovina. 845 Naval Air Squadron and their Sea Kings had been dispatched to the region in late 1992 in response to escalating tensions in the region. They performed various logistical and transport missions, such as the repositioning of Royal Artillery L118 Light Guns in the region and in the evacuation of casualties. In one incident on 24 March 1993, during an attempt to establish an air evacuation route to a UN-declared safe zone, a flight of French Aérospatiale Pumas and Sea King HC4 helicopters were shelled while taking off from an improvised landing zone. Two further Sea Kings arrived to evacuate several UN casualties, managing to fly the wounded to the Bosnian city of Tuzla, where they came under further enemy fire while unloading.

During NATO's intervention in Kosovo, Sea Kings of 814 Naval Air Squadron, operating from numerous Royal Navy vessels in the Adriatic, including the aircraft carrier HMS Invincible, maintained a patrol of the Balkans' coast. The Sea Kings were also heavily used in the transport role during the preparations for a ground invasion of Kosovo.

==== 2000s ====
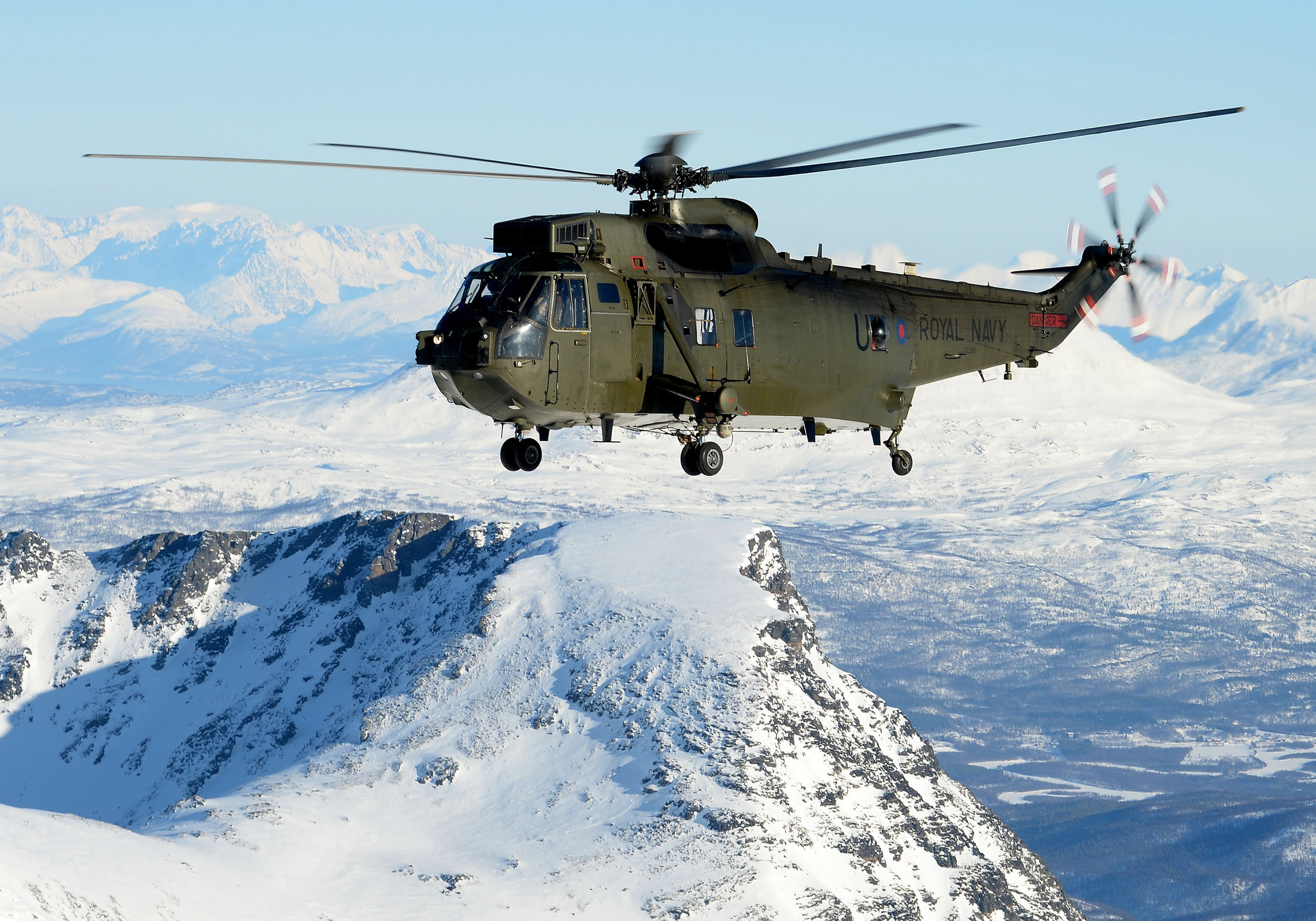
Sea King of the Royal Navy in 2014, in Norway

In 2000, Sea King HC.4s of 846 NAS participated in Operation Palliser in Sierra Leone.

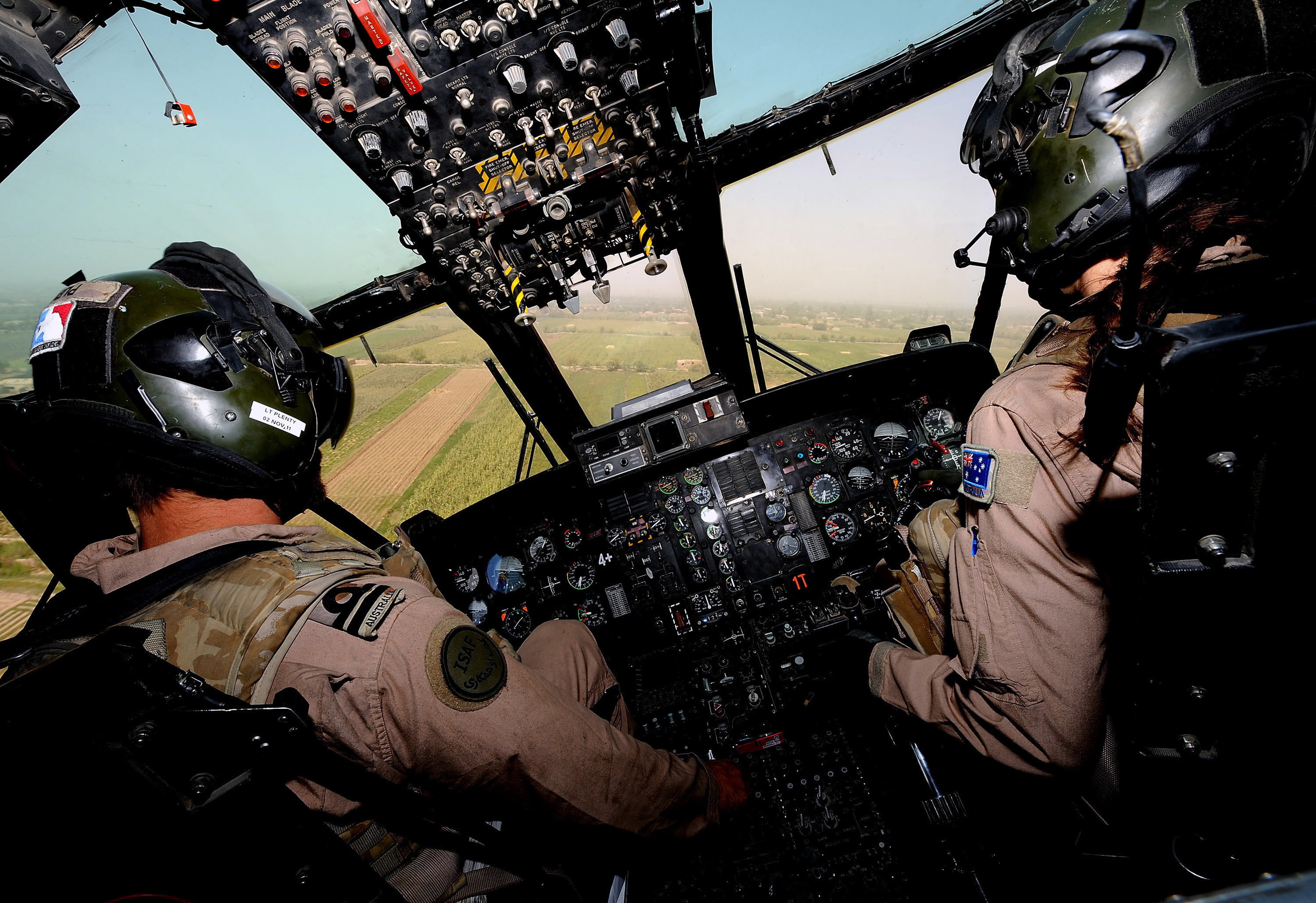
Royal Navy Sea King, cockpit view over Afghanistan, 2011

During the 2003 invasion of Iraq, multiple Sea King ASaC7 from 849 NAS were operated from HMS Ark Royal. On 22 March 2003, two AEW Sea Kings from 849 NAS operating from Ark Royal collided over the Persian Gulf, resulting in the death of seven personnel. A report into the collision called for Sea Kings to be outfitted with night vision goggles, as well as better onboard safety equipment, and recommended changes to procedure regarding the use of radar at night. However, it later transpired that the Board of Inquiry had not been told that the three main contributory factors it reported coincided with the three main areas of degradation between the Mk2 and Mk7. (NVG, Anti-Collision lighting and Interoperability with ships). These had been identified and two contracts let to mitigate the risks had been cancelled by an administrative official. Moreover, in 1994 the RN had rejected the recommendation of the programme manager to retain NVG.

In July 2006, Sea King HC.4 helicopters based at RNAS Yeovilton were temporarily deployed to Cyprus to assist in Operation Highbrow, the evacuation of British citizens from Lebanon.

In October 2011, following several years of service in Afghanistan as troop transports for the International Security Assistance Force (ISAF) forces stationed there, the Sea King HC.4s returned to the UK; their replacement is the AgustaWestland AW101 Merlin. Between April 2009 and July 2011, the Royal Navy's Sea Kings stationed at Camp Bastion conducted over 1000 operational missions.

The last Sea King flight in service was in September 2018, marking an end to half a century of service with the Royal Navy.

=== Australia ===
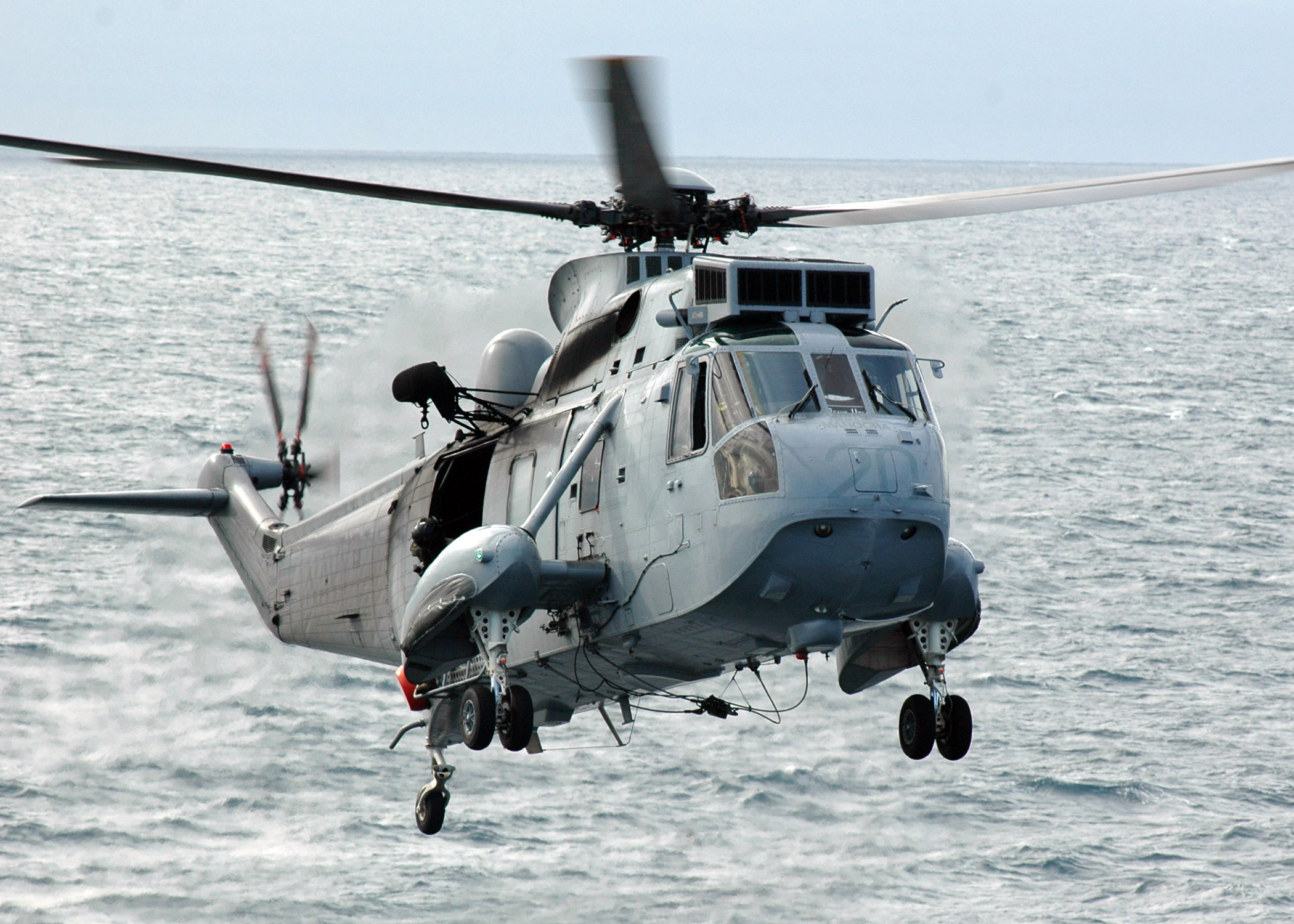
An Australian Sea King landing on the flight deck of USS Tortuga, 2007

In 1974, Australia purchased 12 Westland Sea King Mk 50s as the Royal Australian Navy's new ASW helicopter; the Sea Kings replaced the aircraft carrier HMAS Melbourne's complement of Westland Wessex HAS31 in the following year. Early operations were troubled by a series of accidents. Between October 1975 to May 1979, four aircraft were lost in accidents, the primary causes were the loss of oil from the main gearbox.

The Australian Sea Kings had similar avionics to that of the Sea King HAS.1, with the same ARI 5995 search radar in a dorsal radome, but had American Bendix AN/AQS-13A dipping sonar instead of the Plessey sonar of the Royal Navy Sea Kings. They also had more powerful engines giving improved high temperature hover performance. Australia's Sea Kings were flown by 817 Squadron RAN from HMAS Melbourne until the carrier was retired from service, without replacement. As the Sea King was too large to operate from the Adelaide-class frigates, 817 Squadron was then forced to operate from land bases, in both ASW and utility roles, with the Sea King relinquishing the anti-submarine mission in 1990.

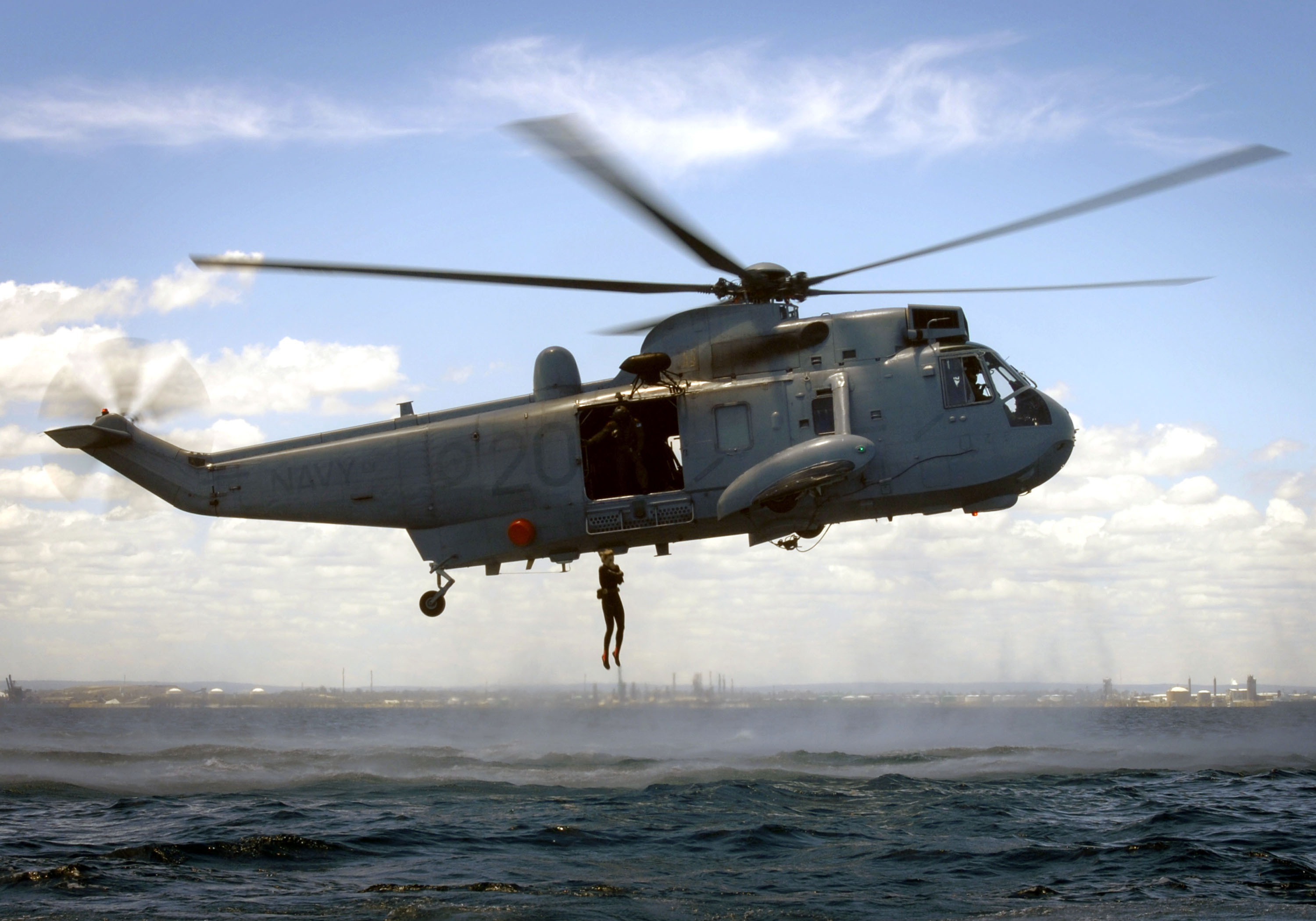
Royal Australian Navy Sea King on exercises with divers

During the 2003 Iraq War, Sea Kings were heavily used in logistical roles, such as the first delivery of humanitarian aid to the Iraqi capital, Baghdad. In the aftermath of the 2004 Indian Ocean earthquake and tsunami, Australian Sea Kings played a major role in disaster relief efforts in Indonesia's Aceh province, delivering medical teams and supplies from Royal Australian Navy ships. Prior to retirement, the last major missions were flown during the 2010–11 Queensland floods, in which Sea Kings provided SAR coverage of the region and delivered aid relief to citizens in the flooded areas.

The replacement of the Fleet Air Arm's Sea King fleet commenced faster than initially planned following the loss of a Sea King during a humanitarian aid mission in Indonesia in April 2005, resulting in nine deaths. Investigators uncovered serious faults in the condition of the Sea King's mechanical flight control system, resulting from maintenance deficiencies. In May 2007, the six remaining Sea Kings were grounded for two months following the discovery of a number of missing parts.

On 1 September 2011, the Australian Minister for Defence Materiel, Jason Clare, announced that the Sea Kings would be withdrawn from service in December 2011; having flown in excess of 60,000 hours in operations in Australia and overseas in that time. The farewell flight was conducted on 15 December 2011, three Sea Kings flew over Sydney Harbour and across to Canberra, passing Lake Burley Griffin and the Australian War Memorial before landing at Nowra. On 16 December 2011, the Chief of Navy presided over the ceremonial decommissioning of 817 Squadron RAN at NAS Nowra. Five of the withdrawn helicopters have been made available for sale. The replacement for the Sea King was intended to be the MRH 90. However, in the 2010s issues with that design lead to only six being acquired and the SH-60 Seahawk ended up being the main successor.

=== India ===
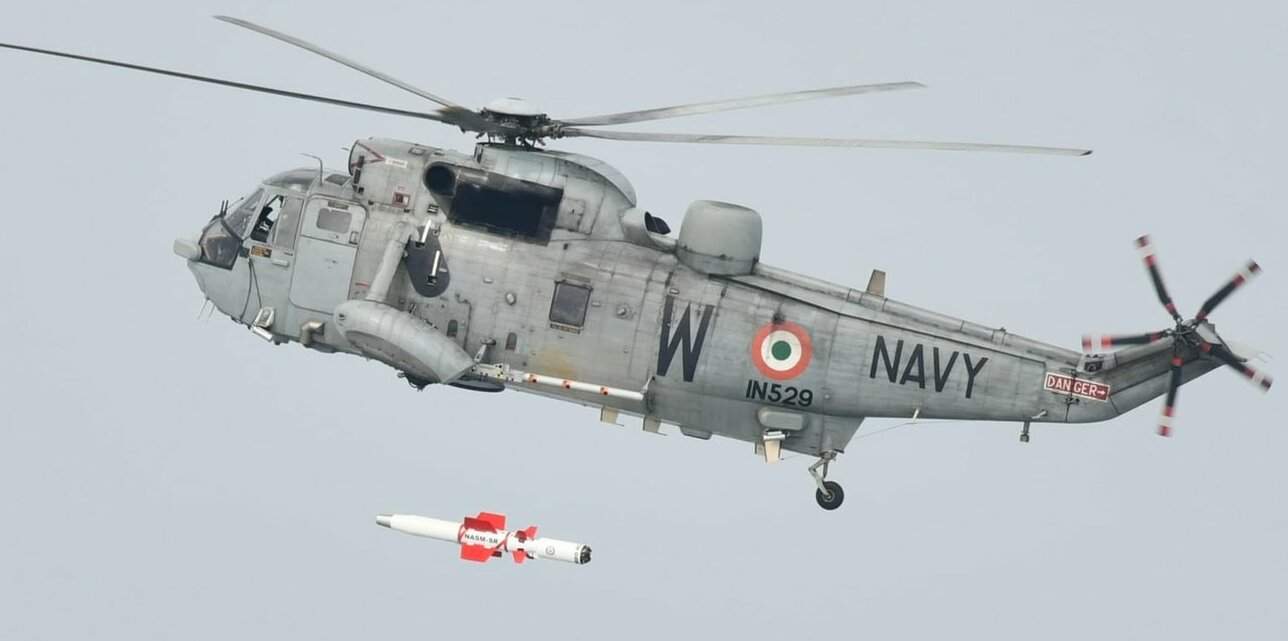
Indian Navy Sea King launching NASM-SR Anti-Ship missile.

Following the Indo-Pakistani War of 1965, Pakistan invested heavily in modern submarines and long-range torpedoes. In response, India opted to procure six Westland Sea Kings from Britain in 1969, for ASW duties, designated as Mk42. The purchase also included the provision of air-droppable homing torpedoes for use against submarines. The first two helicopters, IN501 and IN502, were delivered to the Indian High Commissioner to the United Kingdom, Apa Pant. The helicopters were commissioned into the INAS 330 squadron in 1971. Due to training shortfalls on the new helicopters, Sea King operations were considerably restricted during the India–Pakistan war of 1971; by November 1971, increased aircrew experience had enabled offensive anti-submarine operations to be conducted. The Majestic-class aircraft carrier, INS Vikrant, was also refitted in 1972–1974 to enable extensive Sea King operations, becoming the carrier's primary anti-submarine aircraft while replacing the outdated Breguet Alize. Twelve of the Mk42 variants were bought.

During the early 1960s, India and Britain agreed upon the domestic production of the Leander-class frigate. The initial helicopter deployed aboard India's Leanders, known as the Nilgiri class, was the Aérospatiale Alouette III, however, this offered much less capability in the anti-submarine role compared with the Sea King and the need for design changes was realised to allow the Sea King to be deployed upon the flight deck of the Nilgiri class, a practice pioneered by the Royal Canadian Navy using their Sikorsky CH-124 Sea Kings on similar-sized frigates. It proved unfeasible to operate the Sea King from the unmodified Nilgiri class, with the last two ships of the class being fitted with an enlarged flight deck and hangar. This required removal of the ship's Limbo anti-submarine mortar. Beyond the original 1971 procurement, India chose to acquire a further six Mk42s in 1974, and three more in 1980; these three had been specifically modified to operate from the flight deck of the last two Nilgiris and designated as Mk42A. As a follow-on to the Nilgiris, India commenced development of a new frigate, based on the Leander/Nilgiri, but larger. The resultant Godavari class, also known as Project 16, could operate two Sea Kings simultaneously.

In 1982, India signed a contract to purchase several Mk42B Sea Kings, an upgraded variant to perform dual-purpose: anti-surface and anti-submarine missions, following a competition for the order against the Aérospatiale Super Puma. These helicopters would operate from the Godavari-class frigates as well as replace the existing Sea Kings. A team of Indian engineers was sent to Britain to help develop the Mk42B's avionics, especially the onboard software. Changes from the older Sea Kings included a brand new avionics suite, the use of composite materials throughout the fuselage and in the rotor blades, as well as the integration of the Sea Eagle missile, which had been procured from Britain in 1983. Between 1988 and 1992, a total of 20 Mk42B Sea Kings were delivered to the Indian Navy.

Six Sea Kings with troop-carrying capacity, designated Mk42C, were also procured in 1987. Although the Indian Navy considered the AEW Sea King, expected to be designated as Mk42D, it was judged to be too expensive, consequently, in 2003, the Russian Kamov Ka-31 was procured instead. The indigenous HAL Dhruv was the intended replacement for the Sea King in the ASW role, however, in 2000, it was deemed unsuited, as the Indian Navy were dissatisfied with the design's folding blade mechanism and by the Dhruv's maintenance record.

In May 1998, the United States enacted sanctions upon India as a part of the international response to a series of nuclear weapons tests by India. According to a written reply by the then Defence Minister of India, George Fernandes, during a Parliamentary session in Lok Sabha on 23 November 2000, 60% of the Sea King fleet had been grounded due to the acute shortage of spare parts. Meanwhile, the HAL Chetak fleet was deployed for the Search and Rescue (SAR) roles. Westland also complied with the sanctions by refusing to maintain any US-made components. The British Government pressed US authorities for flexibility, particularly for the Sea King’s SAR role. A limited number of Sea Kings were kept operational by cannibalising other aircraft and the manufacture of some components by Hindustan Aeronautics Limited (HAL). In 19 January 2001, President Bill Clinton permitted a relaxation of the sanctions and greenlit the sale of spare parts for the fleet. As of February 2004, 98 spare parts were ordered with 80 already delivered.

During the 2000s, AgustaWestland and HAL jointly maintained and performed upgrades to India's Sea King fleet. In September 2006, AgustaWestland announced that the firm had received a contract to service and overhaul seven Sea King Mk42B in order to bring them back to service. HAL would perform the repair and overhaul of dynamic components, such as the transmission and rotor heads, building on an earlier memorandum of understanding signed on 28 June 2004 by the Indian Navy and HAL with AgustaWestland to service the navy's 32 active Sea Kings. The agreement covered the repair and overhaul of the transmission system components at a cost of ₹71.68 crore (US$15.82 million). The facility was operational by late 2004.

The Sikorsky MH-60R Romeo helicopters is replacing the Sea King Mk.42/A helicopters which were retired in the 1990s.

In June 2026, the Sea King Mk.42B fleet was phased out of service, leaving only the Sea King Mk.42C fleet in service as well as a small number of Mk.42Bs retained for experimental and test purposes.

=== Norway ===
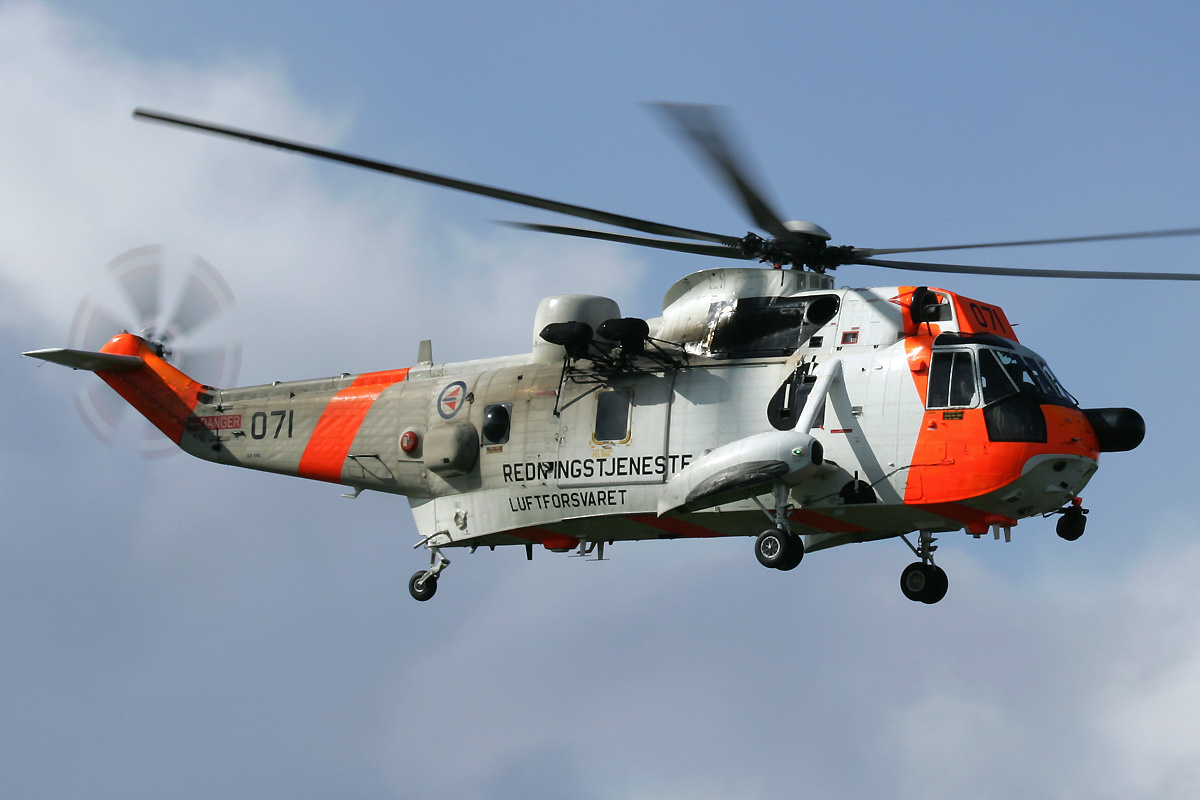
Royal Norwegian Air Force Sea King Mk43B

The Norwegian Ministry of Justice owns 12 Mk43B Sea Kings which are operated by the Royal Norwegian Air Forces's 330 Squadron. The aircraft are used for SAR and air ambulance missions and are under the command of the Joint Rescue Coordination Centre of Southern Norway and Northern Norway. Introduced in May 1973, they were originally stationed at Bodø Main Air Station, Ørland Main Air Station, Sola Air Station and Station Group Banak. In 1997, the squadron conducted 237 SAR and 747 air ambulance missions. From 1995 to 1998, one helicopter was stationed at Ålesund Airport, Vigra, and since 1999, one has been stationed at Rygge Air Station. Florø Airport became a station for one helicopter from 2009.

The helicopters are to be replaced by AgustaWestland AW101 under the Norwegian All-Weather Search and Rescue Helicopter (NAWSARH) programme gradually from September 2020. The candidates for the NAWSARH contract of 10–12 helicopters was the AgustaWestland AW101, NHIndustries NH90, Eurocopter EC225 and Sikorsky S-92. July 2013, AgustaWestland AW101 and Eurocopter (EC225) was short-listed to conduct further discussions for the NAWSARH programme for up to 16 helicopters.

=== Germany ===
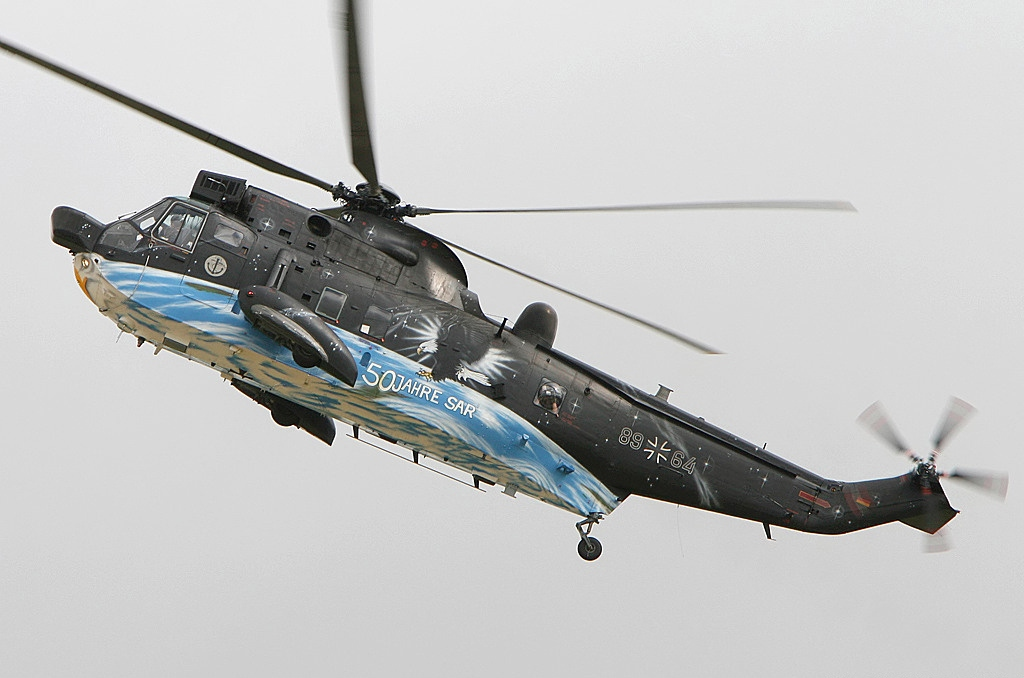
German Navy Mk41 at RIAT 2008

The German Navy placed an order for 22 Sea King Mk.41s on 20 June 1969 as a replacement for the Grumman Albatross flying boat in the Search and Rescue Role. This was the first export sale for the Westland Sea King, and was the first dedicated Search and Rescue Sea King variant, with an enlarged cabin and more fuel. The German Sea Kings had similar radar and navigation equipment to the HAS.1, but was not fitted with sonar. The 22 Sea Kings were delivered between April 1973 and September 1974, equipping Marinefliegergeschwader 5 (MFG 5) (Naval Air Wing 5). An additional Sea King was delivered in April 1975 to replace one destroyed in a gale. The surviving Sea Kings were upgraded between 1986 and 1988, adding the capability to carry Sea Skua anti-ship missiles, which required the addition of a Ferranti Seaspray radar in a nose radome.

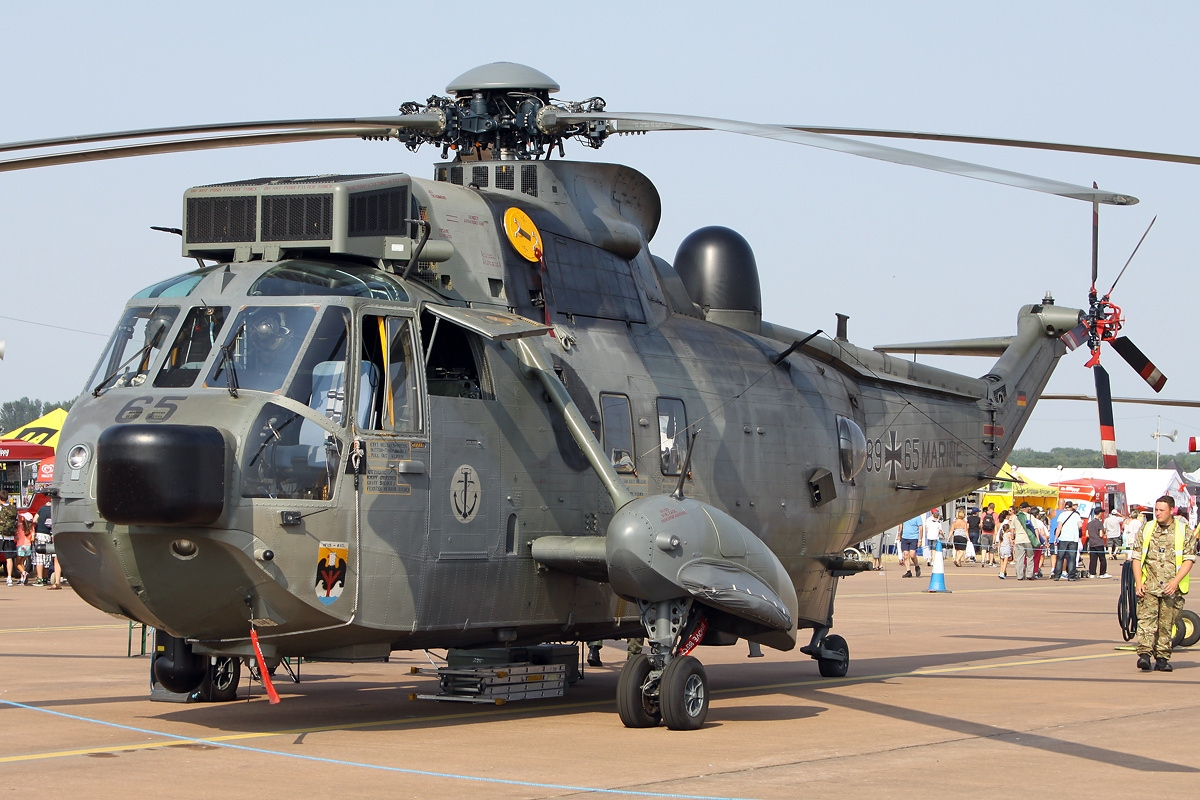
Westland WS-61 Sea King Mk41 of the German Navy, 2013

The 21 remaining Sea Kings are tasked to a variety of roles including SAR, transport, disaster relief, tactical land–sea transport, evacuation, surveillance, reconnaissance and naval support. The main base is Nordholz, although units are always stationed at Heligoland Airfield and Warnemünde, and sometimes at Borkum Airfield. The helicopters are scheduled to be replaced by the NH-90.

HeliOperations continue to operate three Mk 5 Sea Kings, based at RNAS Portland, training German Navy pilots as of 2017. The last German Navy Sea Kings were retired in March 2024, making their last operational flight that month.

=== Ukraine ===
In November 2022, in response to the 2022 Russian invasion of Ukraine the United Kingdom announced they were donating three former Royal Navy Sea Kings to Ukraine. In January 2023, the first Sea King was videoed being used by the Ukrainian Naval Aviation.

In April 2023, the BBC did an interview with one of the co-pilots of a UK donated Sea King to Ukraine. These helicopters served in the Falklands War so they are at least some 40 years old. The co-pilot has said that the Sea King is used for rescuing pilots who have ejected, delivering soldiers, and conducting reconnaissance, among other tasks. One engineer also told the BBC: "They are old...but they have gone through modernisation, and we need them very much. I believe this is just the start of our work together." The BBC also reports that a third Sea King is being prepared to be sent to Ukraine in the "coming weeks". The third Sea King HU.5 was delivered to Ukraine in May 2023.

In January 2024, Germany agreed to send 6 further Sea Kings to Ukraine.

=== Egypt ===
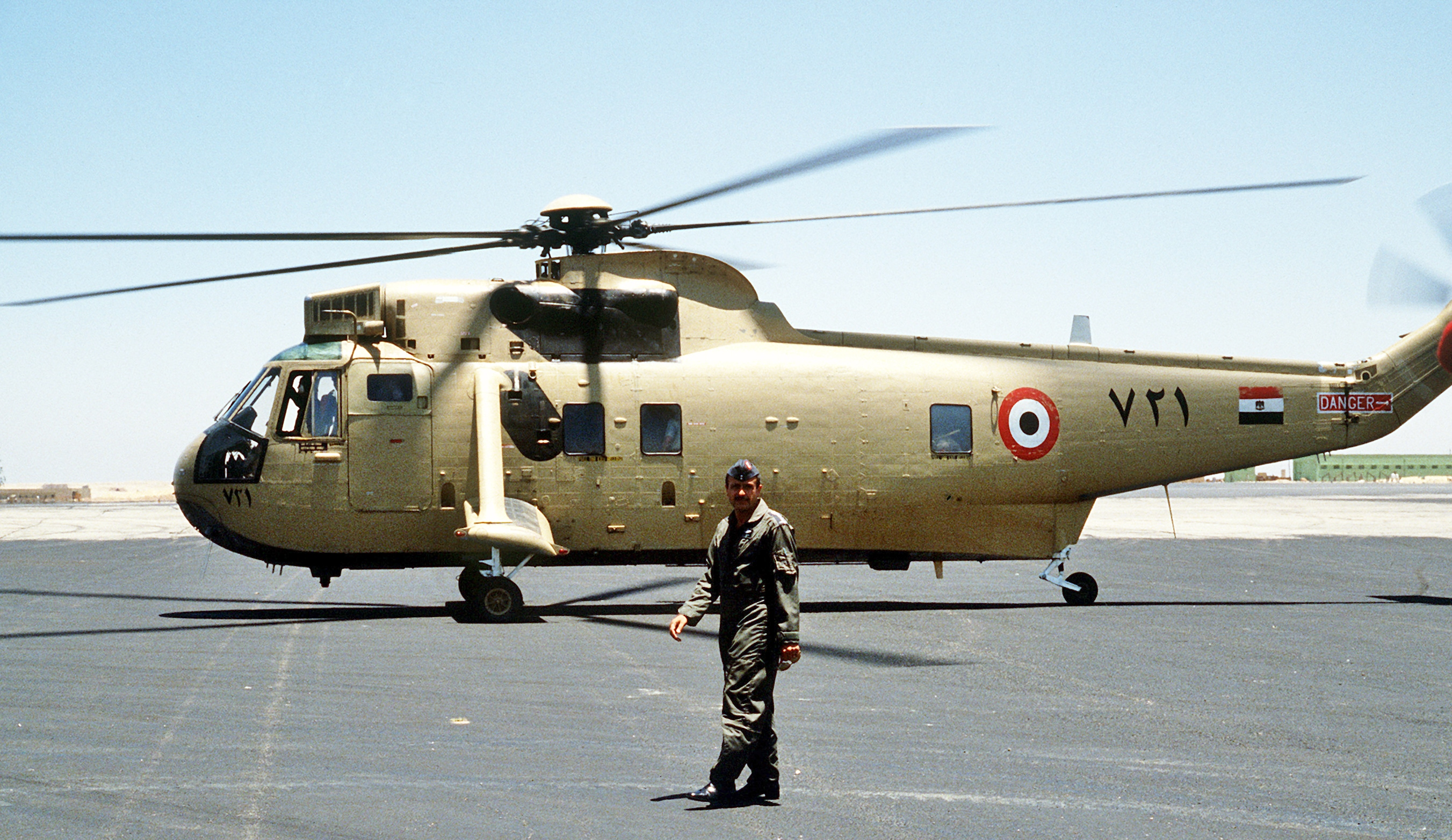
Egyptian Commando Mk 1, June 1980

Egypt is a prolific operator of the Sea King, using many different variants for a wide variety of purposes. In addition to operating ASW Sea Kings for coastal patrols, Egypt procured a land-based transport adapted from the basic Sea King, marketed by Westland as the Commando, including a VIP subvariant. An electronic warfare version was also deployed by the Egyptian Air Force, featuring sophisticated onboard jamming systems. As of 2011, 23 Sea Kings/Commandos remain in service with Egypt.

=== Qatar ===
The Qatar Emiri Air Force also operates Westland's Commando variant, as a standard utility transport for ground forces, a single one was also equipped specially to perform VIP transport duties. A few Qatari Sea Kings serve in an anti-shipping capacity and have been outfitted to carry, and deploy if required, two Exocet anti-ship missiles.

=== Pakistan ===
Pakistan's Navy took delivery of six Mk.45 Sea Kings, a variant based on the Royal Navy's Sea King HAS.1 from 1975. It served in a combined anti-submarine and anti-ship role, carrying the Exocet missile as an alternative to the normal anti-submarine weapon load of four Mark 44 or Mark 46 torpedoes. One of Pakistan's Sea Kings was lost in an accident in February 1986, and was replaced by an ex-Royal Navy HAS.5, redesignated Mk.45C, in January 1989.

=== Belgium ===
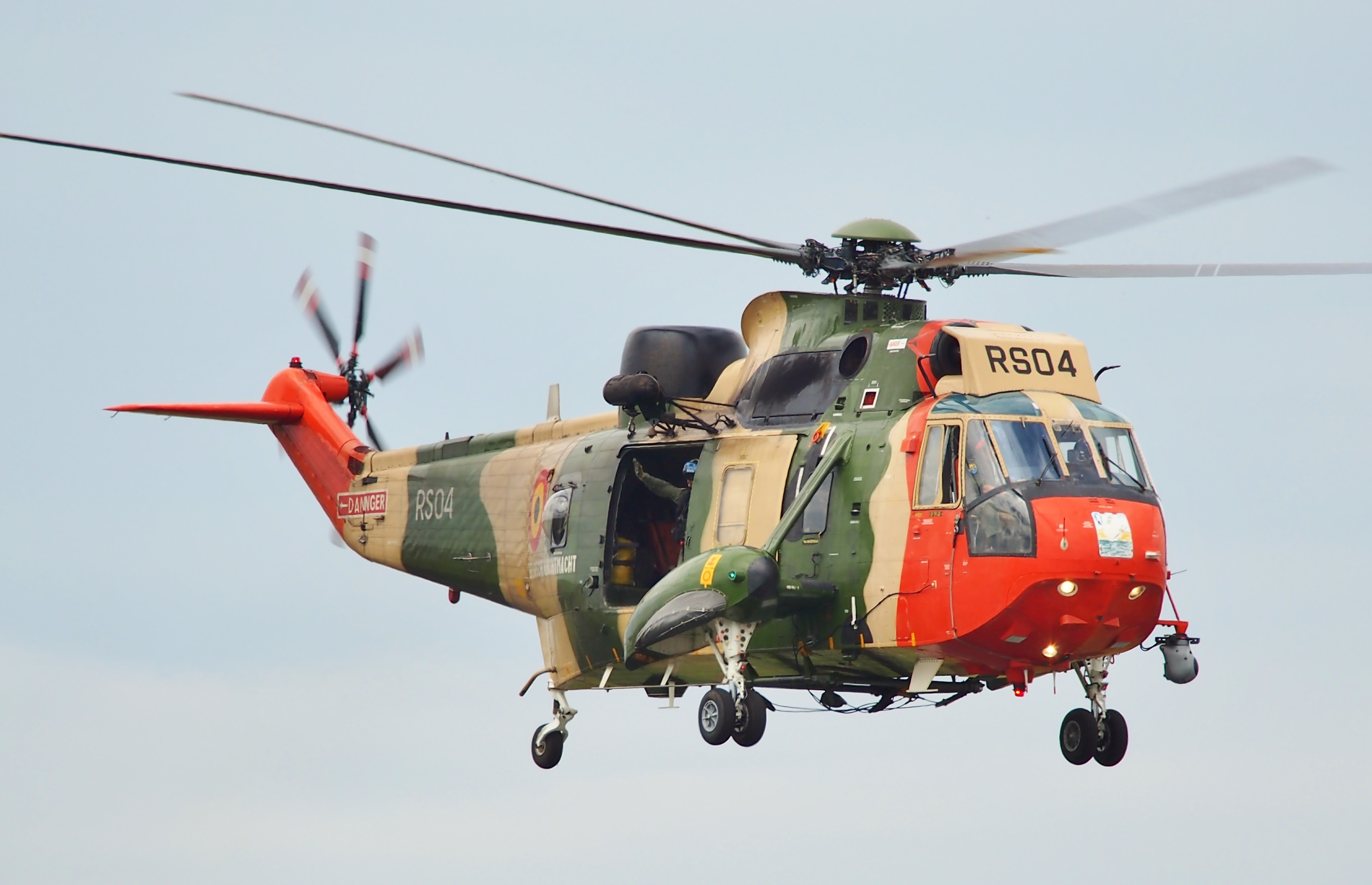
Belgian Sea King, 2014

The Belgian Air Force ordered five Sea King Mk.48s to perform Search and Rescue missions in 1974, which entered service in 1976. They were upgraded with new rotor blades in 1987–1988, and with revised avionics, including new radar and provision of a FLIR turret under the nose from 1995. In 2007 Belgium ordered eight NH90 helicopters, of which four were navalised NFH helicopters intended to replace the Sea Kings in the SAR role. Delays in delivery of Belgium's NH90s, together with an increased demand for the NH90s to operate from the Belgian Navy's frigates, resulted in the retirement date for the Sea Kings being pushed back to 2018. Three Sea Kings remained operational in 2017.

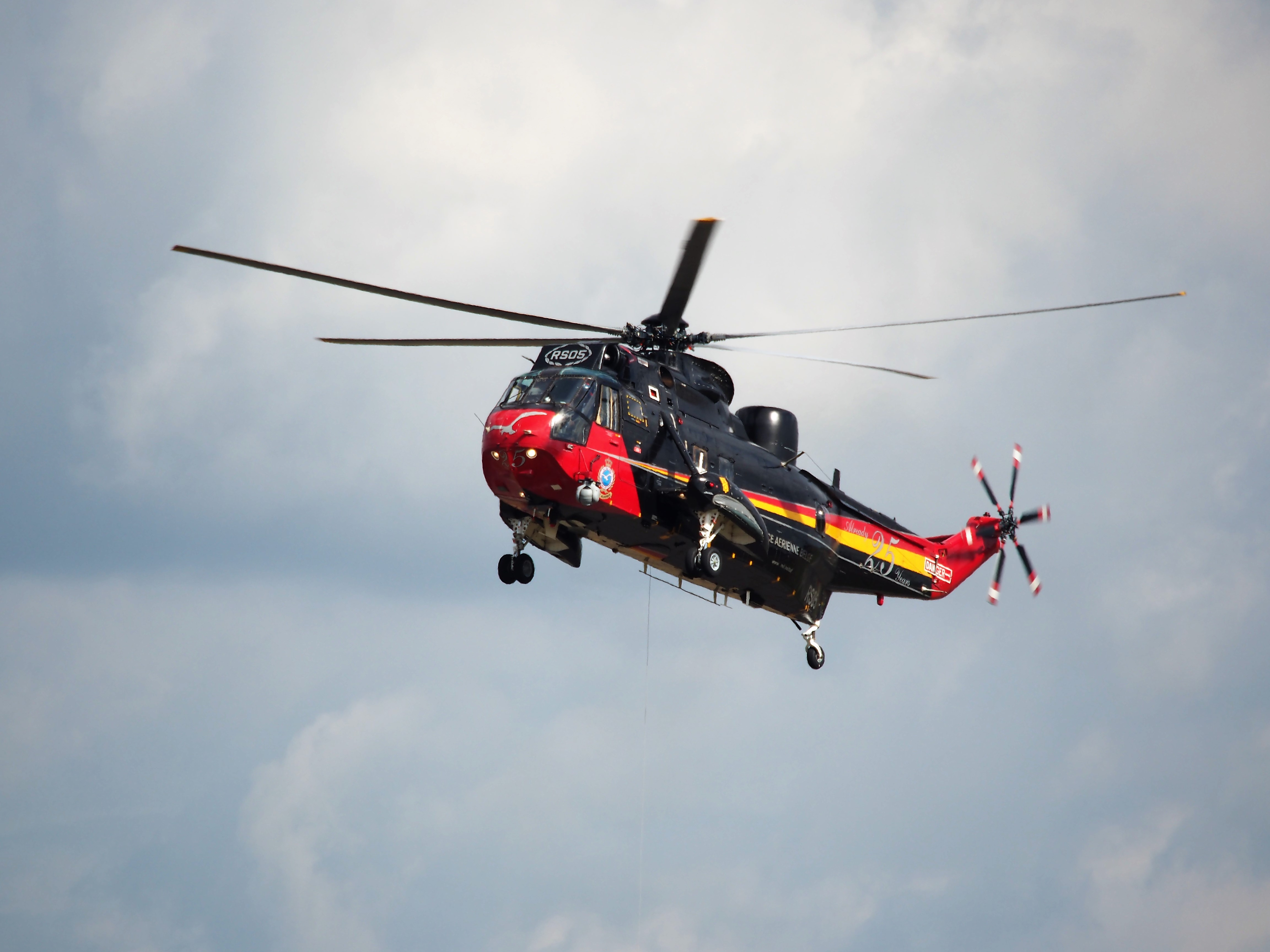
Sea King of the Royal Belgian Air Force, 2018

Belgian Sea Kings had been carried out over 3300 SAR sorties by the end of 2016, with over 1750 lives saved. Belgium retired its last Sea King on 21 March 2019, with a farewell flypass over the Belgian coast. Their SAR role was taken on by four NHIndustries NH90 NATO Frigate Helicopters (NFHs) flying out of Koksijde Air Base near the coast of Flanders. RS05 was donated to "Het Vlaams Luchtvaartopleidingscentrum" (VLOC) and performed its ferry flight on 26/03/2019. Two of the three Belgian Sea Kings were bought by Historic Helicopters of Chard Equestrian, Somerset, which already owned five Westland helicopters that had seen service with the Royal Navy or the RAF. Both Sea Kings left Koksijde Air Base on 20/10/2021 as OO-SEE (RS02) & OO-KNG (RS04) to the UK.

== Variants ==
Sea King HAS.1
The first anti-submarine version for the Royal Navy, with Gnome H.1400 engines, a five-bladed tail rotor, a Plessey Type 195 dipping sonar and MEL ARI 5995 search radar in a dorsal radome. The Westland Sea King HAS.1 first flew on 7 May 1969. 56 built, many of which were converted to HAS.2.
Sea King HAS.2
Upgraded anti-submarine version for the Royal Navy, based on Australian Mk 50. More powerful Gnome H.1400-1 engines, six bladed tail rotor and upgraded avionics (including new Type 2069 dipping sonar), and improved navigation and communications equipment; 21 new build aircraft plus conversions from HAS.1s. Some were later converted for AEW (Airborne Early Warning) duties.

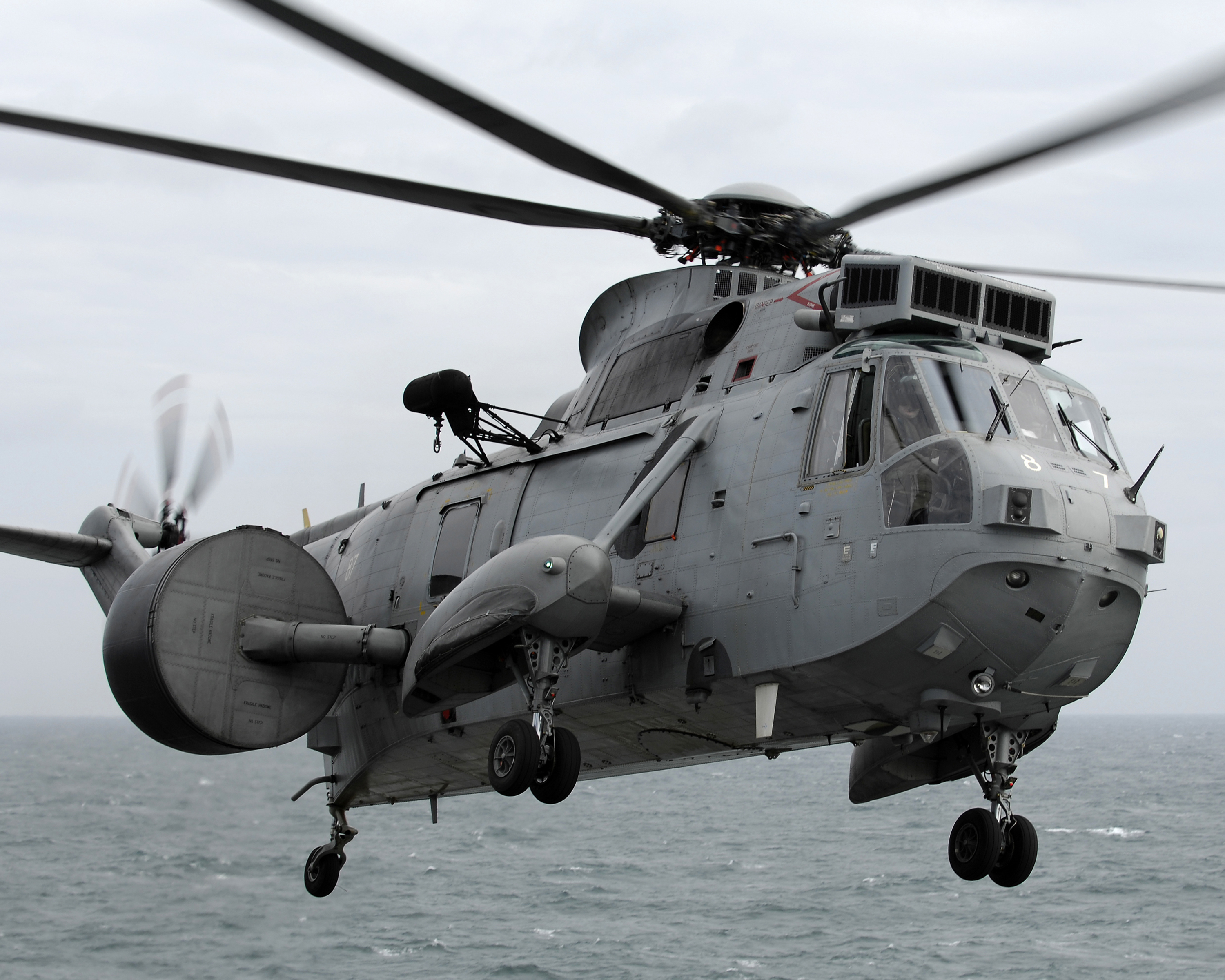
A Sea King AEW 2 Helicopter of 849 Squadron (radar folded)

Sea King AEW.2
Conversion of Sea King HAS.1 or HAS.2s into AEW aircraft after lack of AEW cover was revealed during the Falklands War. Fitted with Thorn EMI Searchwater radar in inflatable radome, with sonar removed. Normally flown with three person (pilot and two observers) crew compared with four-person crew for ASW Sea Kings. Nine converted.

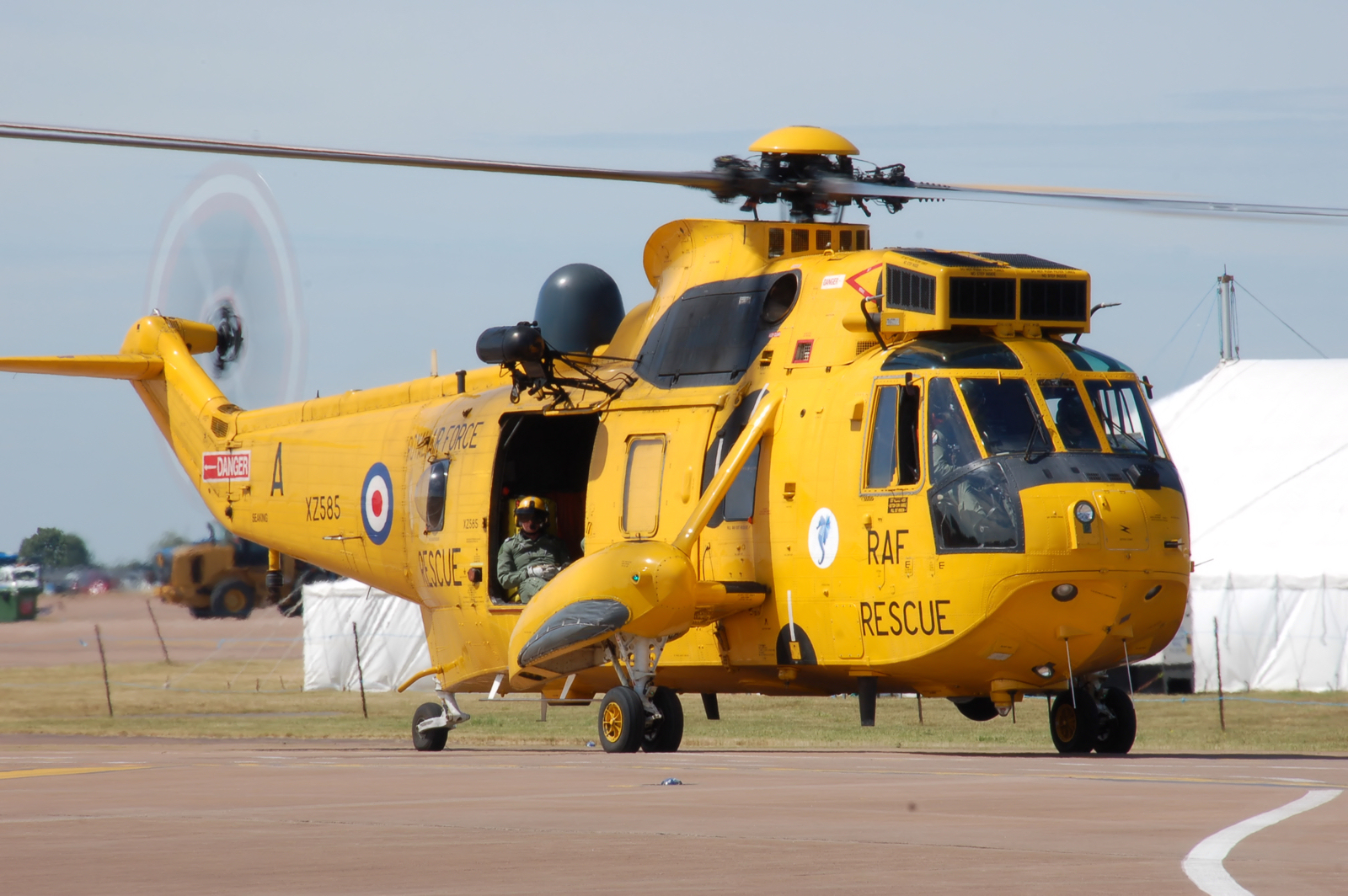
RAF Sea King HAR.3 rescue helicopter at 2010 RIAT

Sea King HAR.3
Search and rescue version for the Royal Air Force. Fitted with relocated rear cabin bulkhead giving greater cabin length, extra fuel and additional observation windows; 19 built.
Sea King HAR.3A
Improved search and rescue version of the Sea King HAR.3 for the Royal Air Force. Fitted with upgraded avionics; six built.
Sea King HC.4 / Westland Commando
Commando assault and utility transport version for the Royal Navy, with simplified undercarriage, and lengthened cabin. Capable of transporting 28 fully equipped troops; 42 built.
Sea King HC.4X
One aircraft first flown on 10 April 1989 for the Empire Test Pilots' School.
Sea King Mk.4X
Two helicopters based on the HC.4 for trials/test beds at the Royal Aircraft Establishment at Farnborough. Fitted with various nose and/or dorsal sensor installations.
Sea King HAS.5
Upgraded anti-submarine warfare version for the Royal Navy, with longer range MEL Super Searcher radar in enlarged dorsal radome, new AQS902 acoustic processing system with provision to use sonobuoys. Entered service in June 1981; 30 new build aircraft plus about 55 converted from earlier versions. Some later converted into the HAR.5 for Search and Rescue.
Sea King HAR.5
Conversion of HAS.5 to search and rescue role for the Royal Navy, with ASW equipment removed but retaining Sea Searcher radar.
Sea King AEW.5
Four Sea King HAS.5s were converted into AEW helicopters for the Royal Navy.

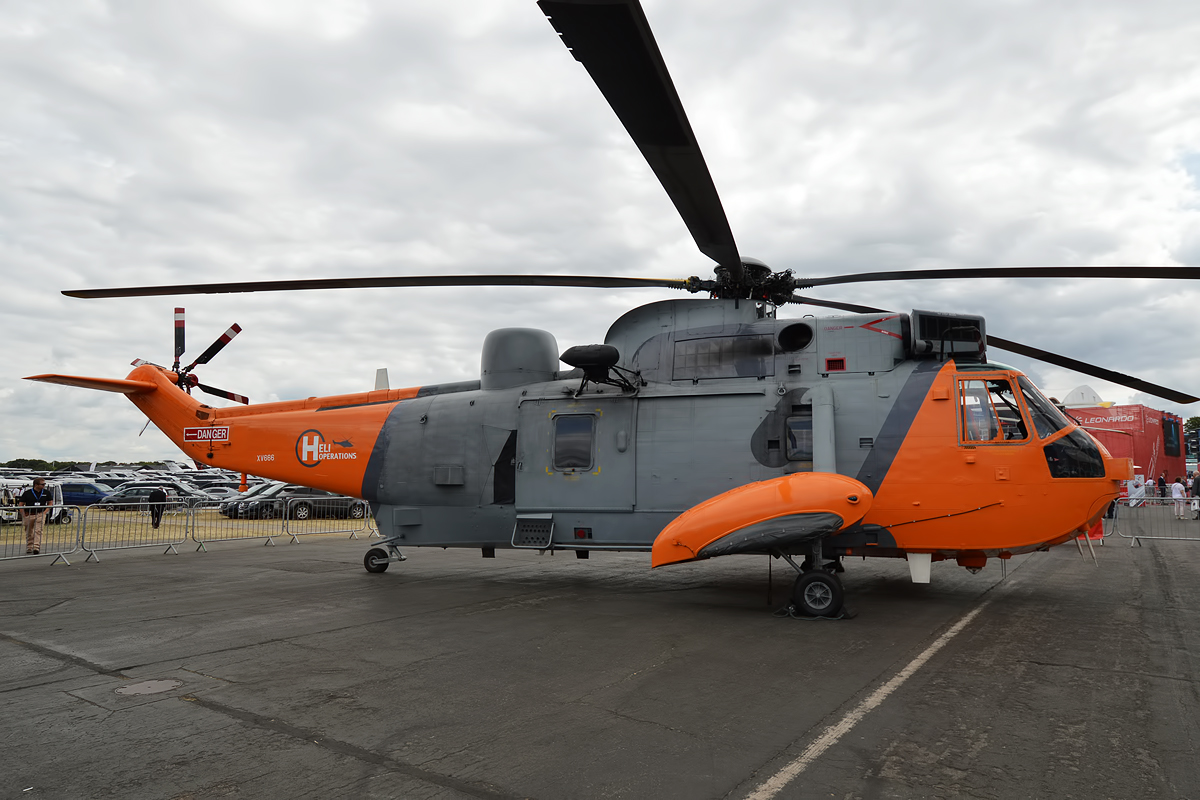
HeliOperations Sea King HU5 in 2018

Sea King HU.5
Surplus HAS.5 ASW helicopters converted into utility role for the Royal Navy.
Sea King HAS.6
Upgraded anti-submarine warfare version for the Royal Navy. fitted with improved avionics, with new sonar processor, improved tactical displays and better communications equipment; five new build aircraft plus conversions.
Sea King HAS.6(CR)
Five surplus HAS.6 ASW helicopters converted into the utility role for the Royal Navy. The last of the Royal Navy's HAS.6(CR) helicopters was retired from service with 846 NAS on 31 March 2010.
Sea King ASaC7
Upgraded AEW2/5 for the Royal Navy with Searchwater 2000AEW replacing original Searchwater radar.

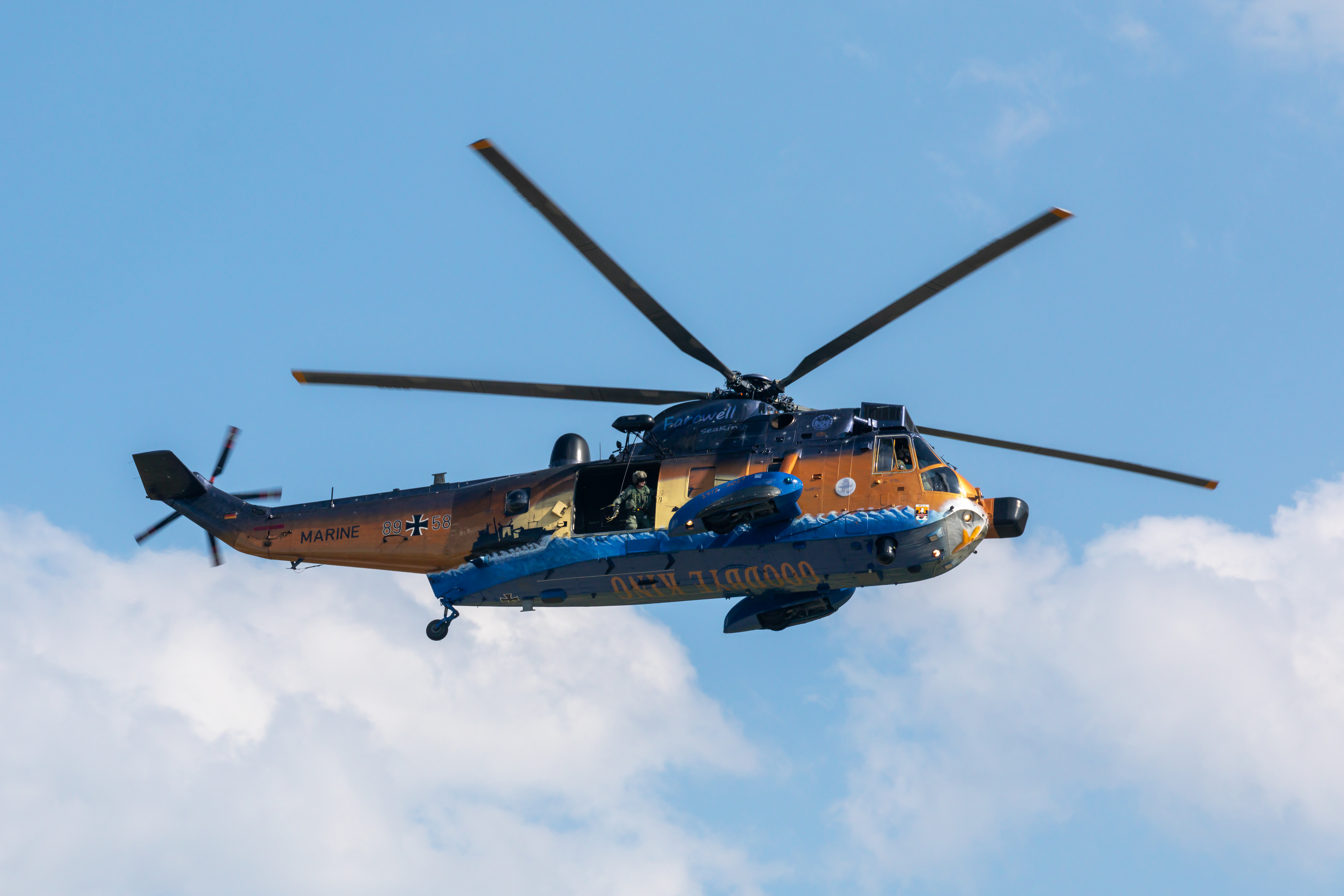
Sea King Mk. 41 of the German Navy in special livery marking the end of its service

Sea King Mk.41
Search and rescue version of the Sea King HAS.1 for the German Navy, with longer cabin; 23 built, delivered between 1973 and 1975. A total of 20 were upgraded from 1986 onwards with additional Ferranti Seaspray radar in nose and capability to carry four Sea Skua Anti-ship missiles. To be replaced by NH90s by 2025.

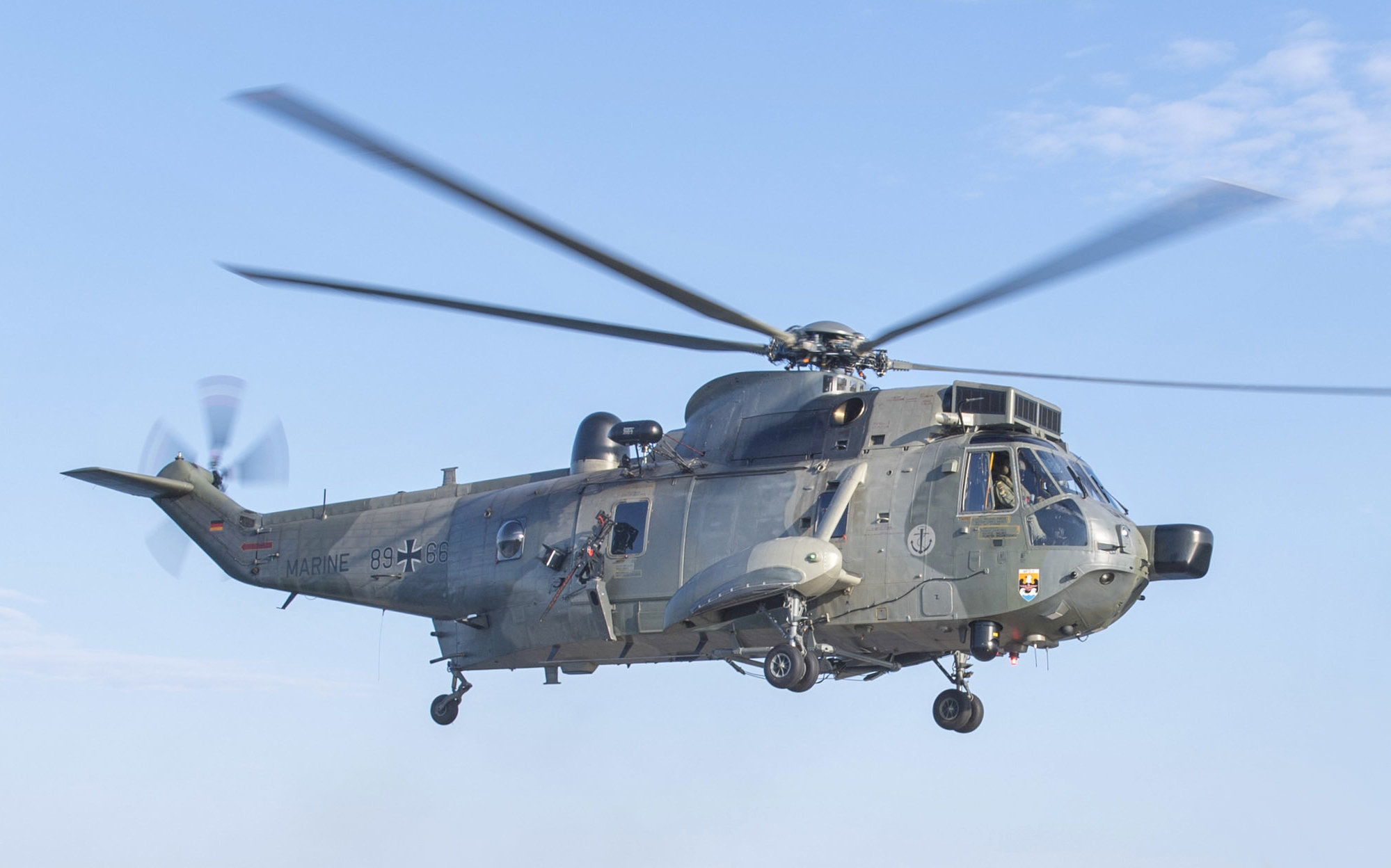
A German Navy Sea King Mark 41 departs USS Oak Hill

Sea King Mk.42
Anti-submarine warfare version of the Sea King HAS.1 for the Indian Navy; 12 built.
Sea King Mk.42A
Anti-submarine warfare version of the Sea King HAS.2 for the Indian Navy, fitted with haul-down system for operating from small ships; three built.
Sea King Mk.42B

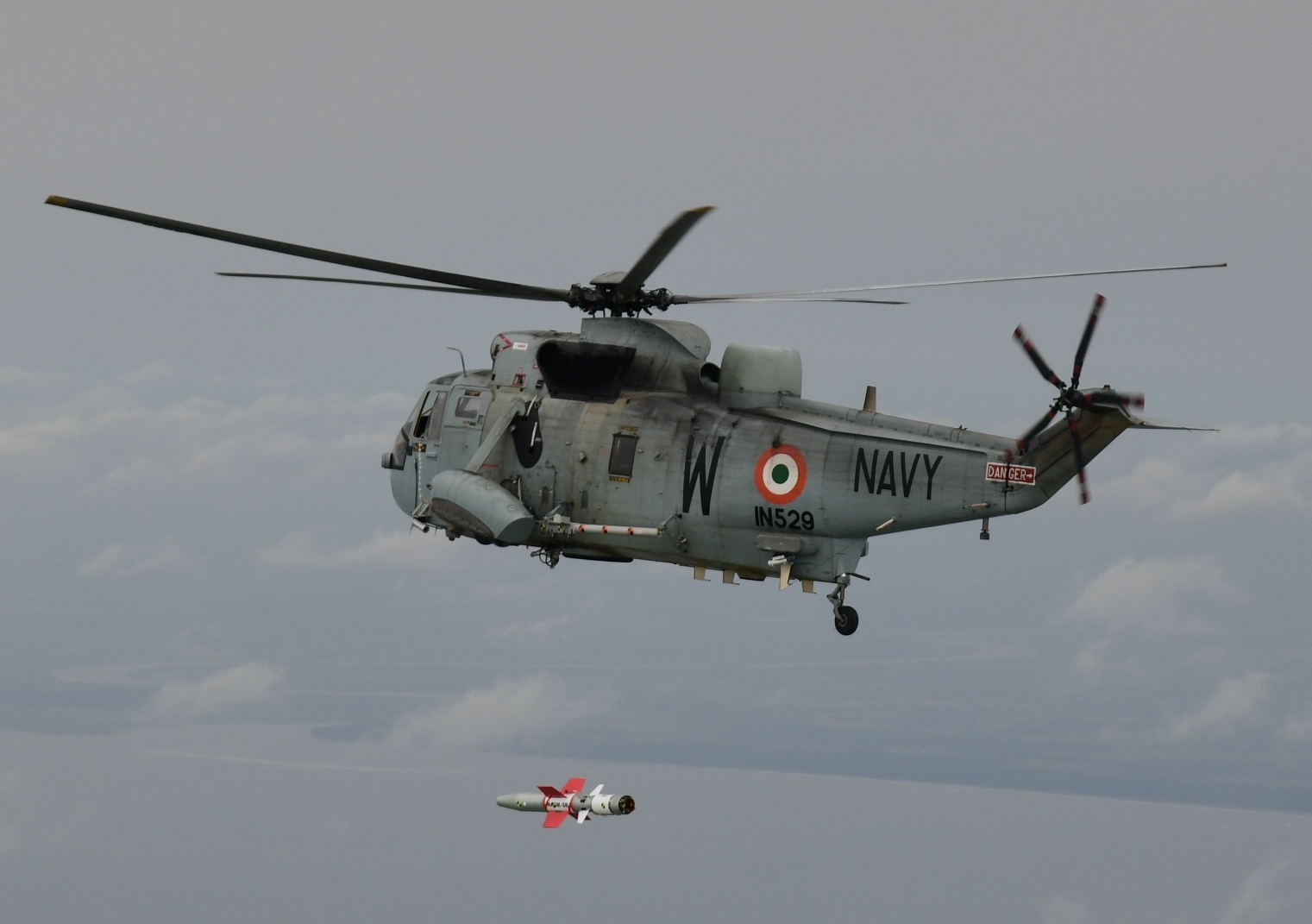
Sea King Mk 42B of the Indian Navy launches a NASM-SR

Multi-purpose version for the Indian Navy, equipped for anti-submarine warfare, with dipping sonar and advanced avionics, and anti-shipping operations, with two Sea Eagle missiles; 21 built (one crashing before delivery).
Sea King Mk.42C

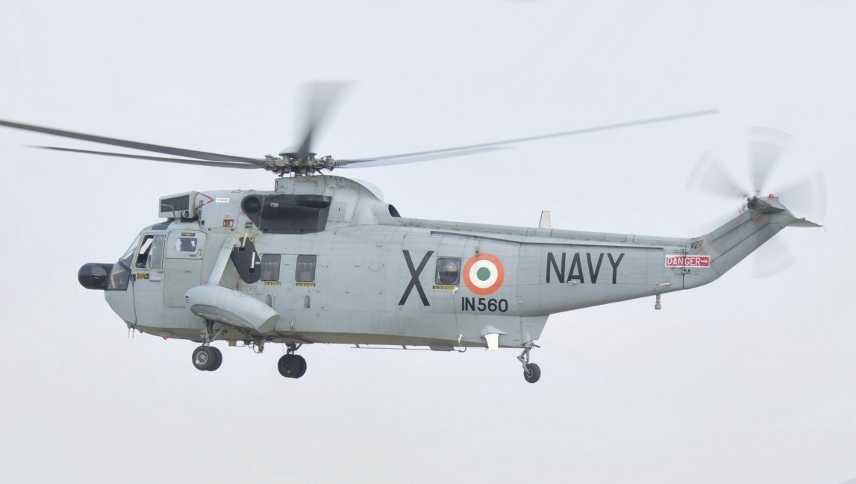
An Indian Navy Sea King Mk.42C

Search and rescue/utility transport version for the Indian Navy with nose mounted Bendix search radar; six built.
Sea King Mk.43
Search and rescue version of the Sea King HAS.1 for the Royal Norwegian Air Force, with lengthened cabin; 10 built.
Sea King Mk.43A
Uprated version of the Sea King Mk.43 for the Royal Norwegian Air Force, with airframe of Mk.2 but engines of Mk.1; single example built.
Sea King Mk.43B
Upgraded version of the Sea King Mk.43 for the Royal Norwegian Air Force. Upgraded avionics, including MEL Sea Searcher radar in large dorsal radome, weather radar in nose and FLIR turret under nose. Three new-build plus upgrade of remaining Mk.43 and Mk.43A helicopters.
Sea King Mk.45
Anti-submarine and anti-ship warfare version of the Sea King HAS.1 for the Pakistan Navy. Provision for carrying Exocet anti-ship missile; six built.
Sea King Mk.45A
One ex-Royal Navy Sea King HAS.5 helicopter was sold to Pakistan as an attrition replacement.
Sea King Mk.47
Anti-submarine version of the Sea King HAS.2 for the Egyptian Navy; six built.
Sea King Mk.48
Search and rescue version for the Belgian Air Force. Airframe similar to HAS.2 but with extended cabin; five built, delivered 1976. Retired in 2018.

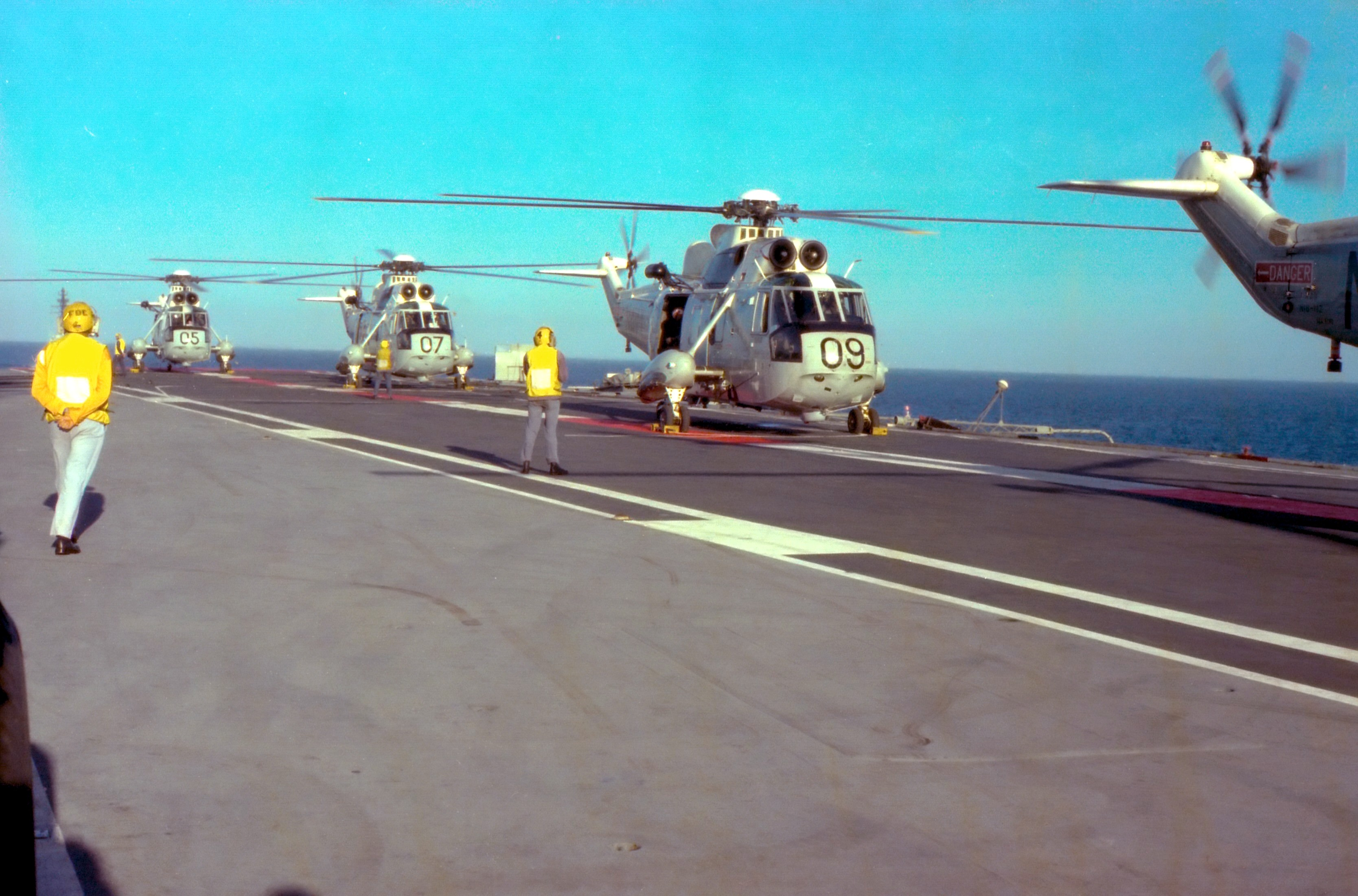
RAN Sea King Mk.50s of HS-817 Squadron preparing to launch from HMAS Melbourne

Sea King Mk.50
Multi-role version for the Royal Australian Navy, equivalent to (but preceding) HAS.2; 10 built.
Sea King Mk.50A
Two improved Sea Kings were sold to the Royal Australian Navy as part of a follow-on order in 1981.
Sea King Mk.50B
Upgraded multi-role version for the Royal Australian Navy.

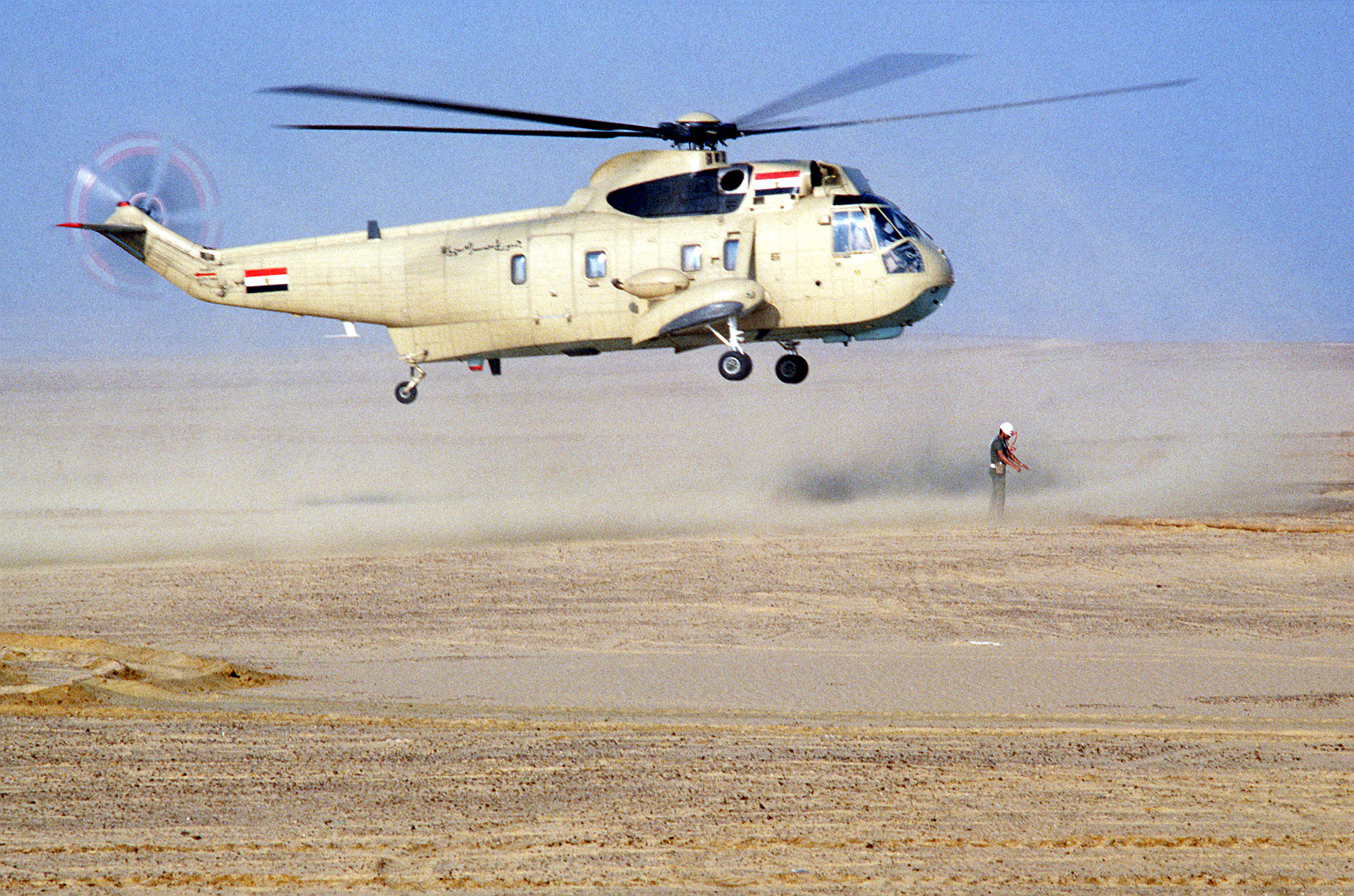
Egyptian Commando Mk.1, 1985

Commando Mk.1
Minimum change assault and utility transport version for the Egyptian Air Force, with lengthened cabin but retaining sponsons with floatation gear; five built.
Commando Mk.2
Improved assault and utility transport version for the Egyptian Air Force, fitted with more powerful engines, non-folding rotors and omitting undercarriage sponsons and floatation gear; 17 built.
Commando Mk.2A
Assault and utility transport version for the Qatar Emiri Air Force, almost identical to Egyptian Mk.2; three built.
Commando Mk.2B
VIP transport version of Commando Mk.2 for the Egyptian Air Force; two built.
Commando Mk.2C
VIP transport version of Commando Mk.2A for the Qatar Emiri Air Force; one built.
Commando Mk.2E
Electronic warfare version for the Egyptian Air Force, fitted with integrated ESM and jamming system, with radomes on side of fuselage; four built.
Commando Mk.3
Anti-ship warfare version for the Qatar Emiri Air Force, fitted with dorsal radome and capable of carrying two Exocet missiles. Eight built.

== Operators ==
=== Current operators ===
Egypt

- Egyptian Air Force
  - 545 Air Wing: 11 Squadron (Mersa Matruh, wfu) → AW149
  - 546 Air Wing: 12 Squadron (Almaza Air Base)

India

- Indian Naval Air Arm - Sea King Mk.42C in service. Sea King Mk.42, Mk.42A, and Mk.42B retired, with Mk.42B retired in June 2026.
  - INAS 350: Sea King Mk. 42C

(Pakistan) Pakistan

- Pakistan Naval Air Arm

(Ukraine) Ukraine

- Ukrainian Naval Aviation
  - 10th Naval Aviation Brigade

(United Kingdom) United Kingdom

- HeliOperations – Private operator providing training for German Naval Aviation Command

=== Former operators ===
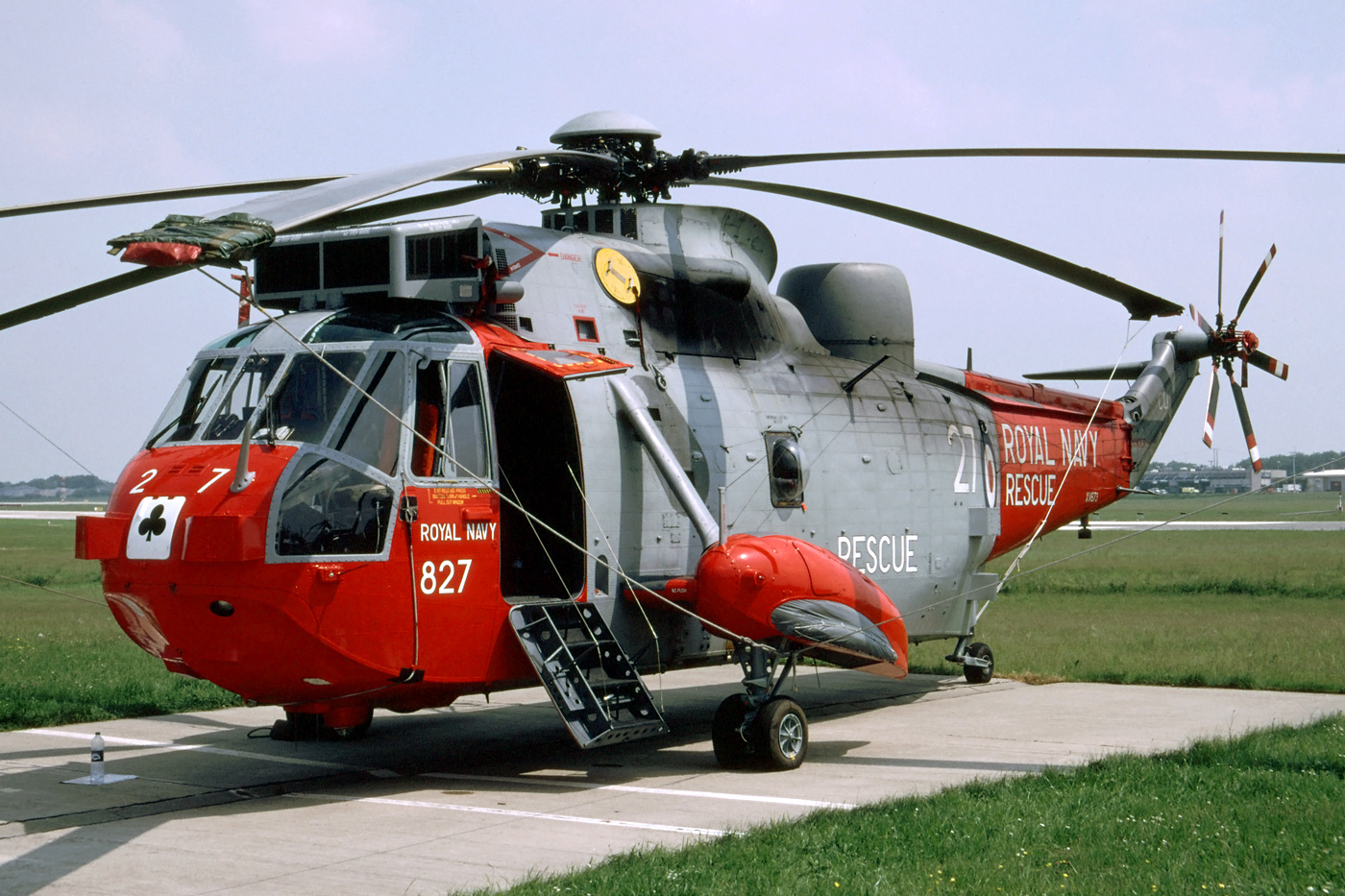
Westland Sea King HU.5 at Helidays airshow 2003

(Australia) Australia

- Fleet Air Arm - in service from 1976 to 2011

Belgium

- Belgian Air Component - in service from 1976 to 2019

(Germany) Germany

- German Naval Aviation Command

Norway

- Royal Norwegian Air Force

(Qatar) Qatar

- Qatar Emiri Air Force - in service from 1975 to 2022

(Sierra Leone) Sierra Leone

- Republic of Sierra Leone Armed Forces - in service from 2006 to 2015

United Kingdom

- Royal Air Force - in service from 1978 to 2015
- Fleet Air Arm - in service from 1969 to 2018
- Qinetiq Group - Used from 2010 to 2016

== Aircraft on display ==
Australia

- N16-118 – Sea King Mk 50 on static display at the Fleet Air Arm Museum near Nowra.

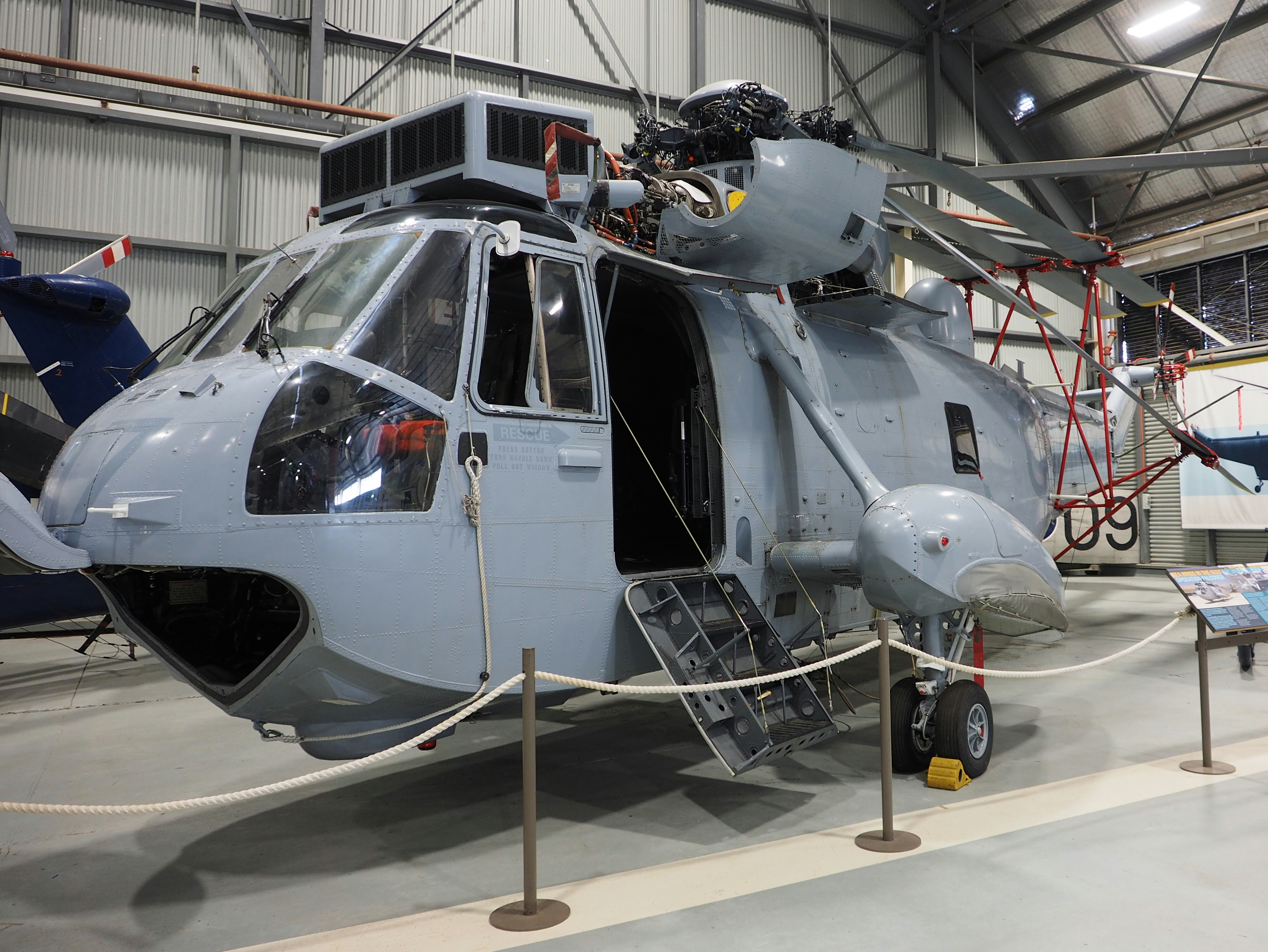
"Shark 07" at the Australian Fleet Air Arm Museum

Belgium

- RS01 – Sea King Mk 48 on static display at the Royal Museum of the Armed Forces and Military History in Brussels.
- RS03 – preserved at Koksijde
- RS05 – Preserved at Ostend Air College, used as an instructional airframe.
- RS02 & RS04 – preserved in flying condition by the Historic Helicopter Group, Somerset

Brazil

- 18 – Sea King SH3 displayed at the Brazilian Navy Cultural Centre, Rio de Janeiro.

India

- IN504 – Sea King Mk 42 on static display at the HAL Aerospace Museum in Bangalore, Karnataka.
- IN505 – Sea King Mk 42 on static display at the Naval Aviation Museum in Dabolim, Goa.

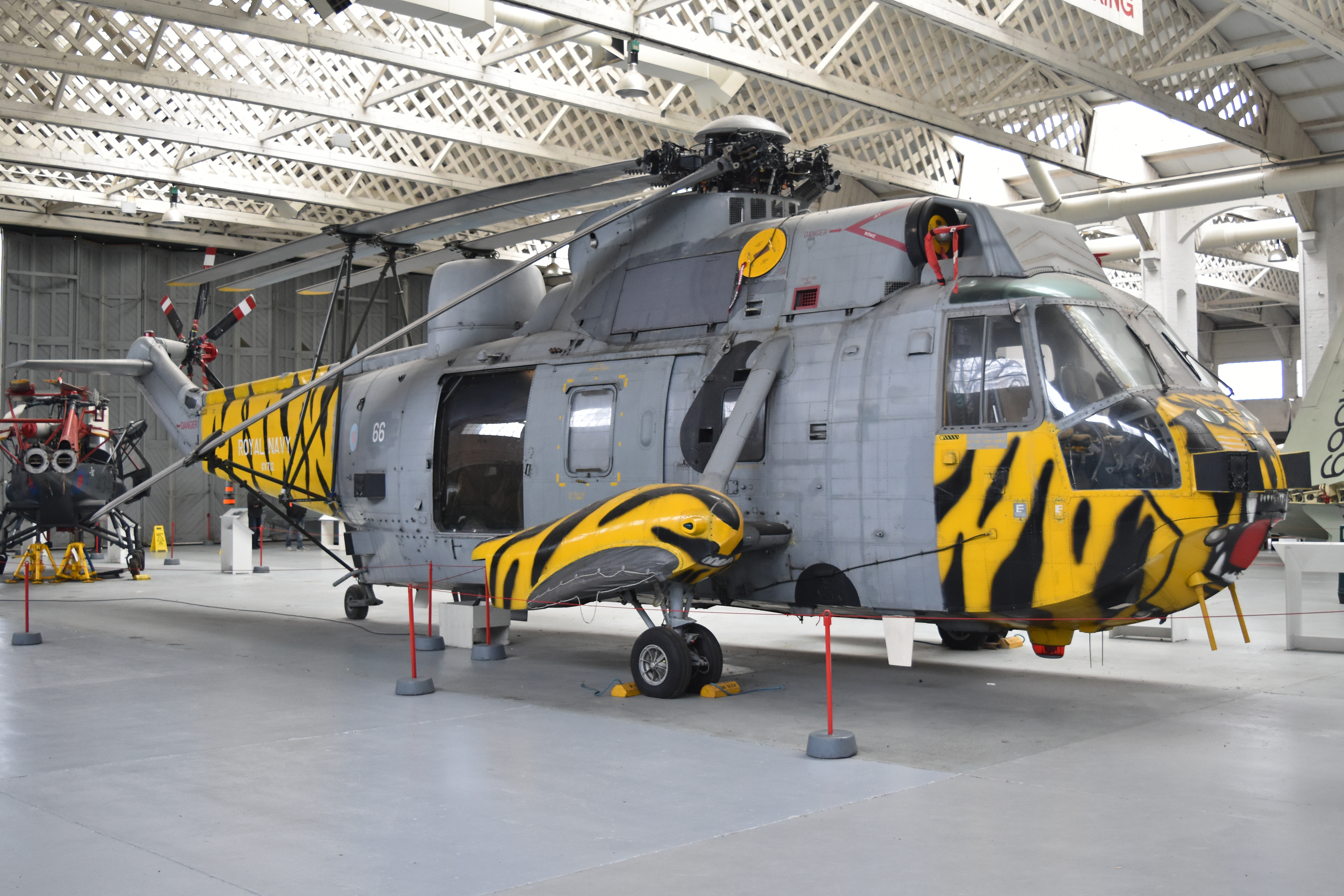
Built in 1972, it saw service in the Gulf, Bosnia, and Kosovo and was put on display at the Imperial War Museum, Duxford in 2010

United Kingdom

- XV677 – Sea King HAS.6 on static display at the South Yorkshire Aircraft Museum in Doncaster, South Yorkshire.
- XV712 – Sea King HAS.6 on static display at the Imperial War Museum Duxford in Duxford, Cambridgeshire.
- XZ574 – Sea King HAS.5 on static display at the Fleet Air Arm Museum in Yeovilton, Somerset. The aircraft was delivered to the Royal Navy in 1976 and was operated from HMS Invincible during Operation Corporate. During the rescue of the crew from ditched Sea King HC.4 ZA311 on 23 April 1982, the helicopter was flown by the former Prince Andrew.
- XZ585 – Sea King HAR.3 on static display at the Royal Air Force Museum London.
- XZ592 – Sea King HAR.3 is on static display at Morayvia in Kinloss, Moray.
- XZ593 – Sea King HAR.3 in storage at the Falkland Islands Museum and National Trust in Stanley, Falkland Islands. The aircraft was donated to the people of the Islands in 2016 after being retired. It will eventually go on display in a new museum annex.
- XZ597 – Sea King HAR.3, restored to flying condition by the Historic Helicopter Group, Somerset
- ZA298 – Sea King HC.4 on static display at the Fleet Air Arm Museum in Yeovilton, Somerset. Nicknamed the "King of the Junglies" it is notorious for having survived multiple times heavy combat damage without any fatalities. First in the Falkland War where it was hit by gunfire from an Argentinian A-4 Skyhawk, then during the Bosnian War where it was showered by small-arms fire and finally during the war in Afghanistan where it suffered a direct hit by an anti-tank RPG.
- ZD477 – Sea King HC.4 on static display at East Midlands Aeropark.
- ZF122 – Sea King HC.4 – Historic Helicopter Group
- ZG822 - Sea King HC.4 Commando on static display at South Wales Aviation Museum (SWAM), former RAF St Athan, near Cardiff

== Specifications (Sea King HAS.5) ==
Orthographically projected diagram of the SH-3 Sea King.

Data from Omnifarious Sea King

General characteristics

- Crew: 2–4
- Length: 55 ft 10 in (17.02 m)
- Height: 16 ft 10 in (5.13 m)
- Empty weight: 14,051 lb (6,373 kg)
- Gross weight: 21,000 lb (9,525 kg)
- Max takeoff weight: 21,400 lb (9,707 kg)
- Powerplant: 2 × Rolls-Royce H.1400-2 Gnome turboshaft engines, 1,660 shp (1,240 kW) each
- Main rotor diameter: 62 ft 0 in (18.90 m)
- Main rotor area: 3,020 sq ft (281 m^{2})
- Blade section: NACA 0012

Performance

- Cruise speed: 112 kn (129 mph, 207 km/h) (max cruise at sea level)
- Range: 664 nmi (764 mi, 1,230 km)
- Rate of climb: 2,020 ft/min (10.3 m/s)

Armament

- 4× Mark 44, Mark 46 or Sting Ray torpedoes, or 4× Depth charges
- Provision for a door mounted machine gun – various calibers installable

== See also ==
Related development

- Sikorsky CH-124 Sea King
- Sikorsky SH-3 Sea King

Aircraft of comparable role, configuration, and era

- AgustaWestland AW101
- Mil Mi-14
- Sikorsky SH-60 Seahawk

Related lists

- List of active United Kingdom military aircraft
- List of accidents and incidents involving the Westland Sea King
