= AgustaWestland AW159 Wildcat =

Improved series of the Westland Super Lynx military helicopter

AW159 Wildcat
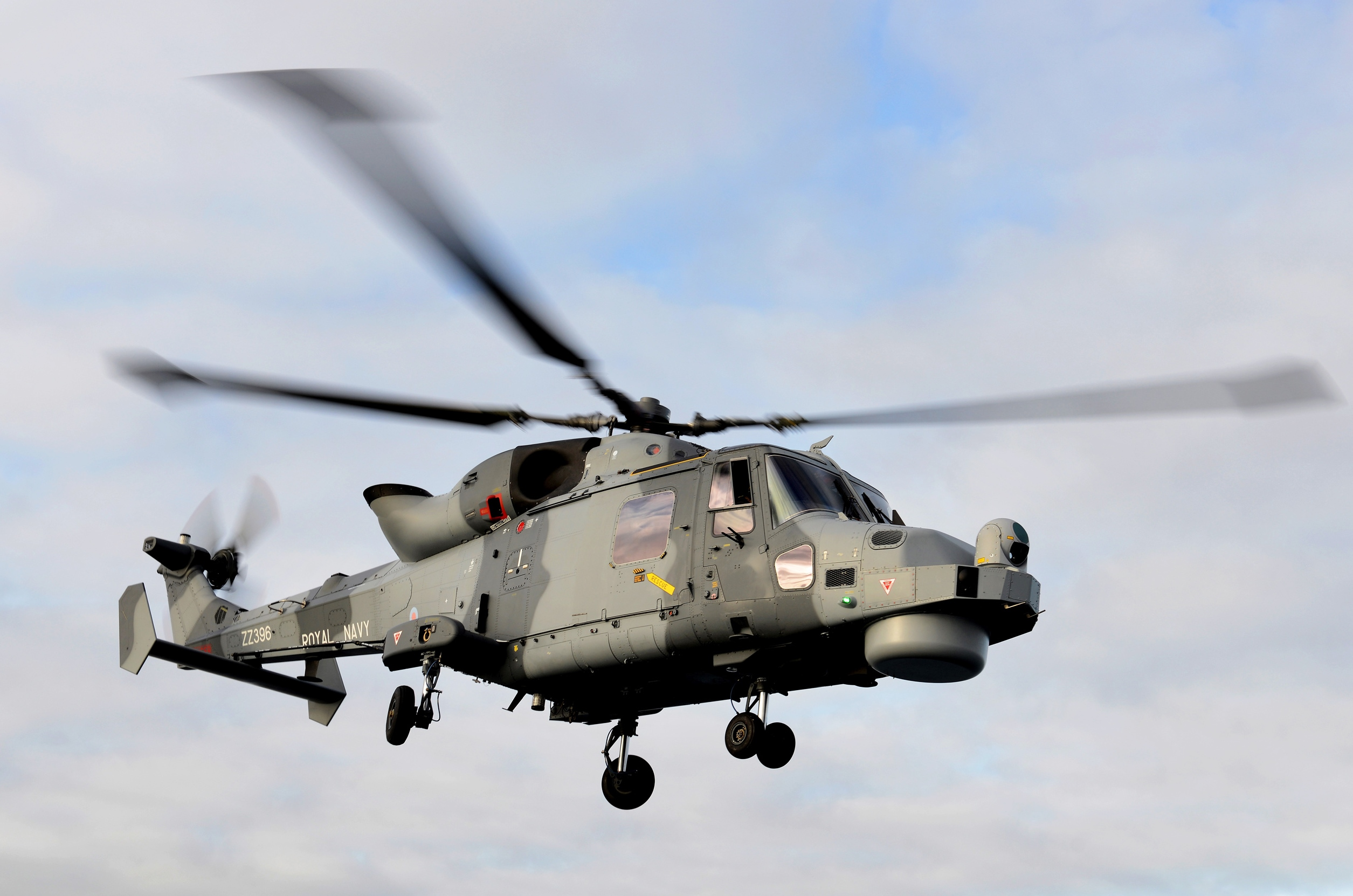
- Wildcat HMA2 naval variant in 2013

General information
- Type: Utility, SAR and ASuW helicopter
- National origin: United Kingdom, Italy
- Manufacturer: AgustaWestland; Leonardo
- Status: In service
- Primary users: British Army: Royal Navy; Republic of Korea Navy; Philippine Navy

History
- Manufactured: 2009–present
- Introduction date: 29 August 2014 (AH1)
- First flight: 12 November 2009
- Developed from: Westland Super Lynx

The AgustaWestland AW159 Wildcat (previously called the Future Lynx and Lynx Wildcat) is a military helicopter, developed by the British-Italian helicopter manufacturer AgustaWestland, and later marketed by the Italian aerospace company Leonardo. It is an improved version of the Westland Super Lynx designed to serve in the battlefield utility, search and rescue, aerial reconnaissance, anti-submarine warfare (ASW), anti-surface warfare (ASuW), utility, command and control, and troop transport duties.

Development commenced during the early 2000s under the name Future Lynx to replace the existing Lynx helicopters then operated by both the Royal Navy and British Army. Refurbishment and upgrading of the existing first generation Lynx airframes was evaluated but found to be uneconomical in comparison to producing a new generation airframe. Various new electronics and avionics systems were incorporated, including a glass cockpit, onboard integrated digital open systems architecture, Bowman communications system, and various mission systems. The Wildcat also features numerous airframe improvements, such as the redesigned tail rotor and nose, greater structural strength, and a longer lifespan of 12,000 flight hours. New munitions, such as the Martlet air-to-surface missile and the Sea Venom anti-ship missile, were also integrated.

The Wildcat performed its maiden flight on 12 November 2009. On 29 August 2014, the Wildcat AH1 formally entered service with the Army Air Corps; in early 2015, the Fleet Air Arm's first Wildcat HMA2 commenced its initial operational deployment at sea. Within five years, both services had withdrawn the last Lynx helicopters in favour of the Wildcat. The rotorcraft is also marketed towards export customers; overseas operators include the Republic of Korea Navy and the Philippine Navy.

== Development ==
=== Background ===
In 1995, the British Government announced that the Royal Navy's existing Westland Lynx helicopters were to be replaced; at that point, the service was intended to operate an all-Merlin fleet. Despite this stated intent, Westland Helicopters continued to hold talks with the Ministry of Defence (MOD) to find a future role for the type during the late 1990s; the firm issued multiple proposals to either extend the life of the existing Super Lynx through upgrade programmes or more ambitious remanufacturing programmes incorporating varying degrees of new components. In 2002, the Future Lynx project originated in two studies to determine the suitability of a derivative of the Super Lynx 300 to replace the existing Lynx helicopters of the Royal Navy and British Army. These requirements were known as the Surface Combatant Maritime Rotorcraft (SCMR) and Battlefield Light Utility Helicopter (BLUH) programmes, respectively.

In July 2002, AgustaWestland received a contract to conduct a formal assessment phase of the Future Lynx. On 22 July 2002, a collaboration agreement was signed between AgustaWestland and Thales Group, under which Thales was assigned development responsibility for the programme's core avionics, including communications, navigation, and flight management electronics; that same day, additional MOD funding for the fledgling Future Lynx programme was announced as having been allocated. By April 2003, the in-service dates for the BLUH and SCMR programmes were reported as being April 2007 and April 2008 respectively. Early on, AgustaWestland elected to adopt a glass cockpit incorporating electronics upgrades from the AgustaWestland AW101 along with various airframe improvements, such as a redesigned tail rotor and nose along with increased use of machined components over fabricated counterparts. By July 2004, the option of upgrading and remanufacturing the first generation Lynx had reportedly been judged to be uneconomical, and the BLUH programme of building a new generation airframe had been given prominence instead.

=== Restructure ===
In late 2004, the National Audit Office (NAO) criticised the UK's existing helicopter fleet as being insufficient; concurrently, a major reorganisation of the MOD's procurement process subjected ongoing helicopter programmes to major restructuring. The BLUH was reportedly deemed unaffordable, and it was speculated that a more modest sensor fit could be used, as well as the procurement of alternative platforms such as the NHIndustries NH90, Eurocopter EC120, or Eurocopter EC635 instead of the Future Lynx. Ultimately, the utility transport aspect of the BLUH requirement was de-emphasised and the programme renamed Battlefield Reconnaissance Helicopter (BRH).

In early 2005, the MOD was reportedly deliberating on whether to launch an open competition for other companies to bid to meet the BRH requirement, or to sole-source the contract from AgustaWestland to proceed with the Future Lynx. In late March 2005, the MOD confirmed the Future Lynx as being its preferred option for its rotorcraft renewal programme, and was expected to place a non-competitive contract with AgustaWestland later that year. The signing of the contract was delayed to the following year, this was reportedly in part due to preparation and release of the 2005 Defence Industrial Strategy, which supported the selection of the Future Lynx.

On 22 June 2006, the MOD awarded AgustaWestland a £1 billion contract for 70 Future Lynx helicopters as a commitment under the Strategic Partnering Arrangement with AgustaWestland. The programme envisaged providing the British Army with 40 aircraft and Royal Navy with 30, with an option for a further 10, split equally between Army and Navy. By late 2007, the Future Lynx was scheduled to enter service with the British Army and Royal Navy in 2014 and 2015 respectively. In 2008, the cancellation of the Future Lynx programme has reportedly been under consideration. In December 2008, the MOD announced that the main contract would be proceeding, only incurring a minor cut in numbers set to be procured, for a total of 62 rotorcraft.

=== Into production ===
In October 2007, following the passing of an interim critical design review, the Future Lynx programme proceeded to the manufacturing phase; the first metal was cut on the initial flight-test rotorcraft that same month. In September 2008, the powerplant selected for the Future Lynx, the LHTEC CTS800-4N, received European Aviation Safety Agency (EASA) type certification, enabling production deliveries to commence. In November 2008, GKN delivered the first complete airframe to AgustaWestland; the new airframe reportedly had an 80 per cent lower part count than the earlier generation Lynx, which was achieved via the use of monolithic machine components.

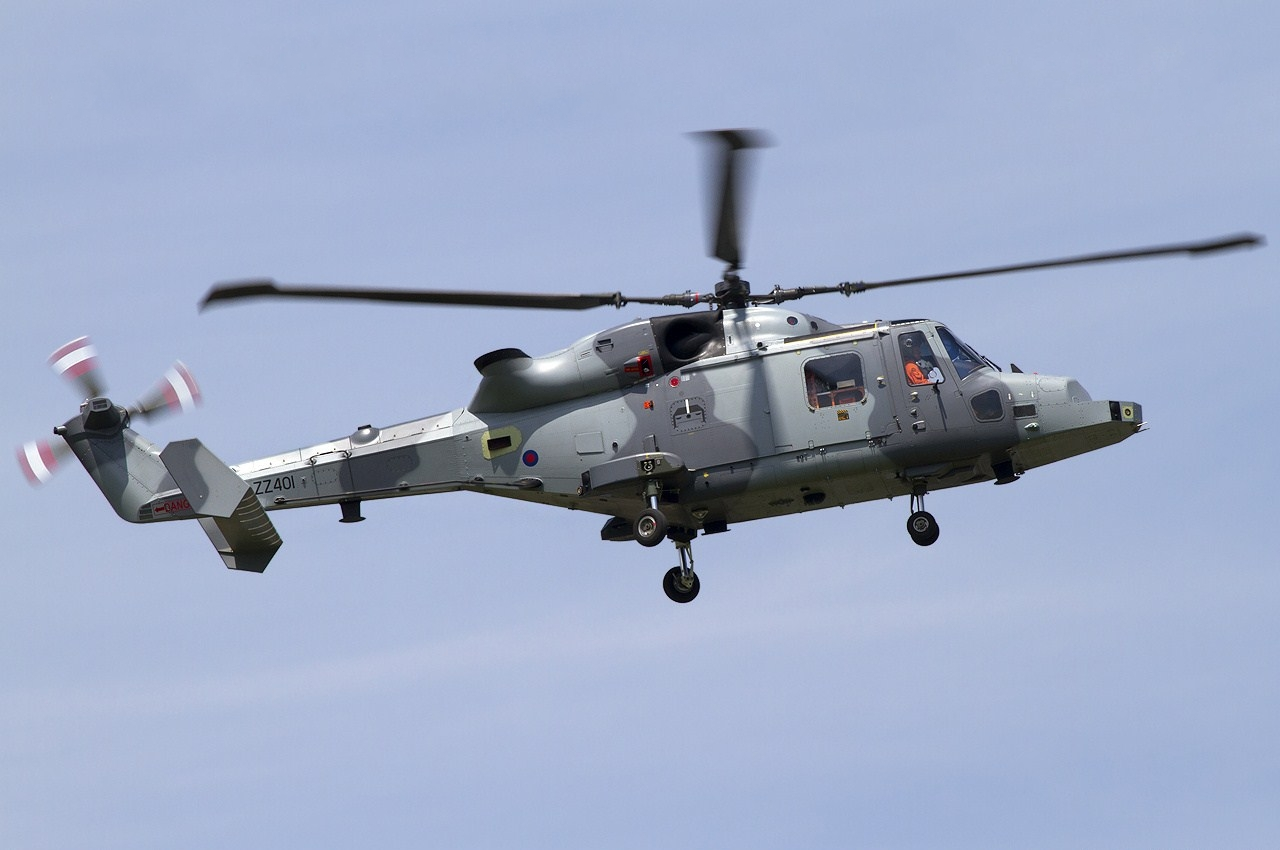
Wildcat prototype ZZ401, 2011

On 24 April 2009, it was announced that the Future Lynx had been designated AW159 by AgustaWestland, and would be known in British military service as the Wildcat. On 12 November 2009, the first Lynx Wildcat conducted the type's maiden flight from AgustaWestland's facility in Yeovil, Somerset. On 14 October 2010, the second AW159 performed its first flight; on 19 November 2010, a third Wildcat joined the flight test programme.

In July 2009, it was announced that the cost of the Wildcat programme had increased to £1.7 billion. In December 2011, it was reported that four additional Wildcats had been ordered for use by British special forces. These are to be joined by four from the current fleet on order, for a total of eight aircraft to operate as Wildcat Light Assault Helicopters. Further orders for the Wildcat have since been placed by export customers, including the Republic of Korea Navy and the Philippine Navy. The Philippines Department of National Defense secretary disclosed during the 2026 budget hearings that the government is negotiating with Leonardo for the purchase of six (6) new Wildcats at the cost of $745 million in a government-to-government arrangement.

== Design ==
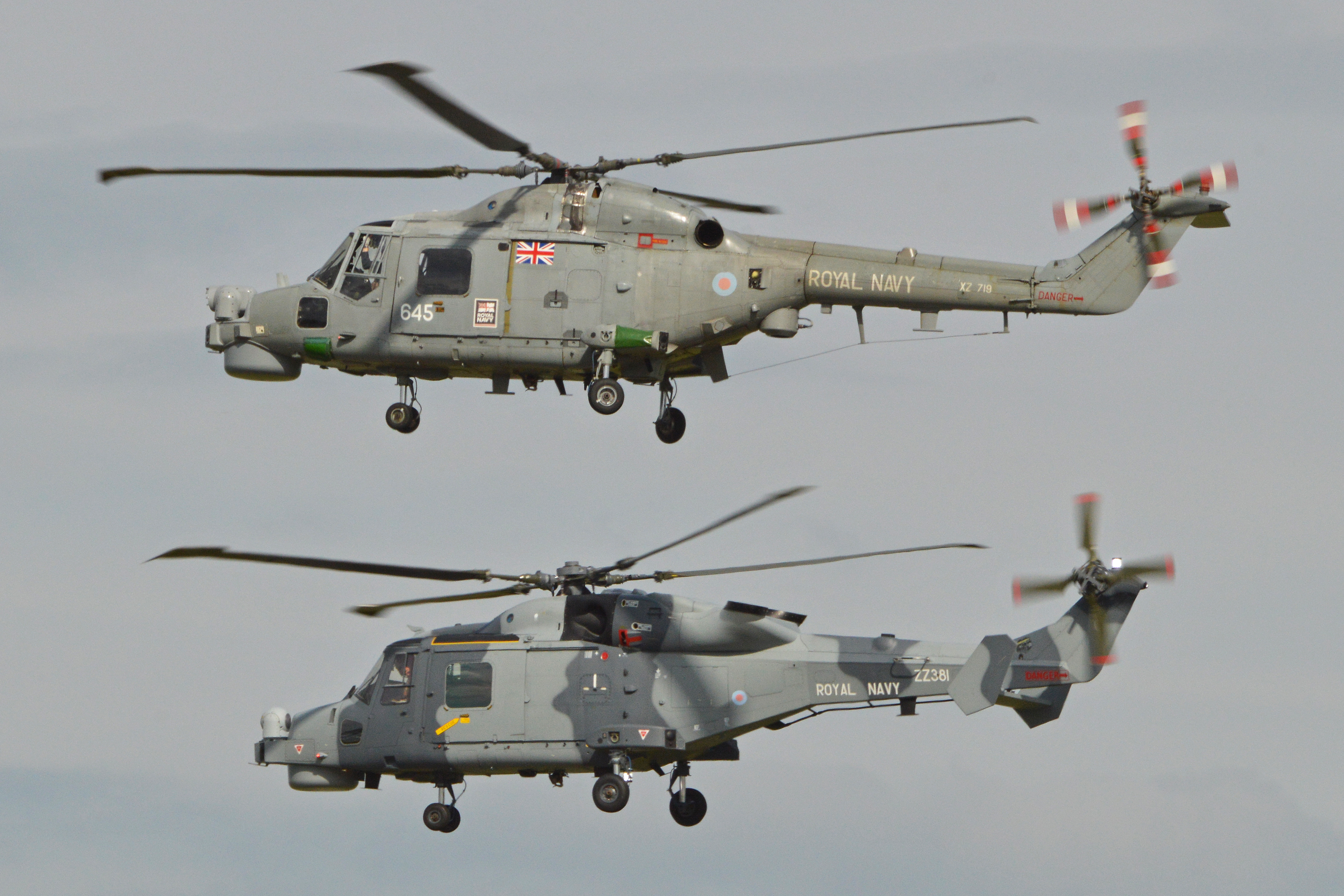
An AW159 Wildcat (lower) flying alongside a Lynx (upper), its predecessor, July 2014

The AW159 Wildcat is a further development of the Westland Lynx. While the AW159 shares broad similarities in appearance to the Lynx, it has significant design differences and is heavily modernised and adapted to gain new attributes and functionality. The AW159 comprises 95% new components; the remaining 5%, consisting of such items as the fuel system and main rotor gearbox, are interchangeable with the Lynx AH7 and HMA8 variants. During development, the Army and Navy variants of the Wildcat reportedly maintained 98 per cent commonality with one another. The AW159 is the first helicopter by AgustaWestland to be designed inside an entirely digital environment. Among other changes, certain external elements of the Wildcat, such as the tail rotor, have been redesigned for greater durability and stealth qualities.

Both Army and Navy variants have a common airframe, which is manufactured by GKN Aerostructures; the airframe has undergone marinisation for operations in the naval environment and providing for a greater airframe lifespan of 12,000 flight hours. The wheeled undercarriage is also strengthened for naval landings on both variants. The AW159 is powered by two 1,362 hp (1,016 kW) LHTEC CTS800 turboshaft engines, driving the rotorcraft's BERP IV rotor blades via a new transmission, increasing the maximum take-off weight by more than 1 ton over the legacy Super Lynx. It is equipped with a new composite tailboom, tailplane, tail rotor, nose structure and avionics suite. The naval version is also equipped with a Selex Galileo Seaspray 7000E active electronically scanned array (AESA) radar and L-3 Wescam MX-15HDi electro-optical/infrared nose turret. A glass cockpit comprises the primary human-machine interface, using four 255 x 200mm multifunction displays to provide information to the aircrew and interact with the avionics systems on board.

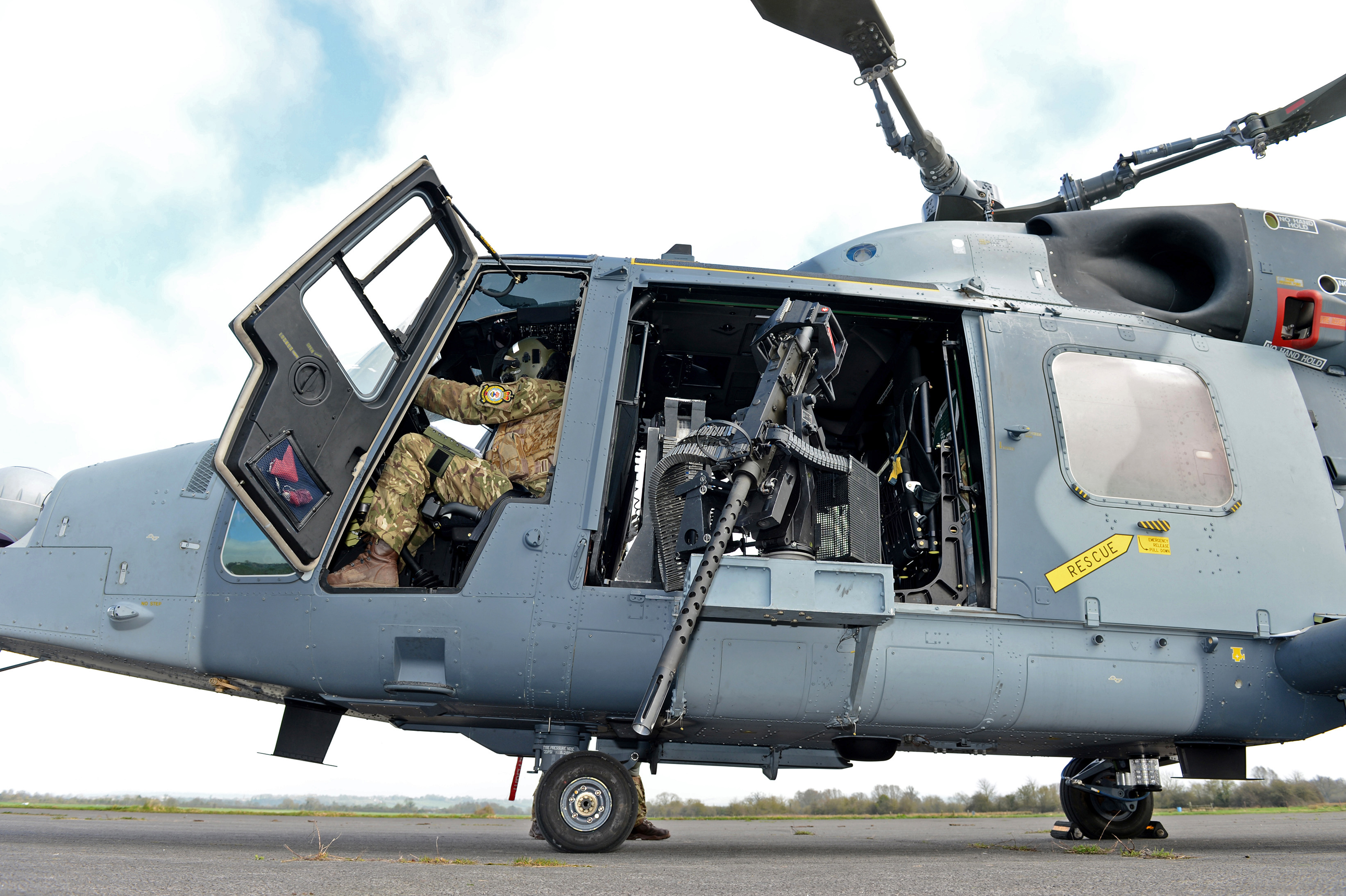
British Army AH1 with 0.5-inch (12.7mm) M3M heavy machine gun

The Wildcat features an increased payload and range over the preceding Super Lynx; it is operationally required to carry up to 8 Future Anti-Surface Guided Weapons up to 185 kilometers from a host ship and remain on station for up to an hour. The type can perform aerial reconnaissance, anti-submarine warfare (ASW), anti-surface warfare (ASuW), utility, fire control, command and control, and troop transport duties. In June 2014, the Royal Navy awarded Thales Group a £48 million contract to deliver the Martlet missile for the Wildcat under the Future Anti-Surface Guided Weapons Light (FASGW (L)) programme for targets such as small boats and fast attack craft. A Wildcat can carry four launchers, each with five Martlets. In March 2014, a contract was awarded to MBDA for the Sea Venom (FASGW Heavy) missile for use against vessels and land targets, replacing the Sea Skua. Both missiles are being integrated by AgustaWestland in a single £90m programme by 2018, with IOC for both planned by October 2020. However, the entry into service of both Martlet and Sea Venom was subsequently delayed, with Martlet now expected to enter full service in 2025 and Sea Venom's full operational capability expected in 2026. Martlet reached initial operating capability in 2021, while Sea Venom achieved "initial operating capability" in October 2025.

Many elements of the AW159's avionics are provided by Thales Group. The type is reported to possess significant ISTAR capabilities and improved situational awareness, achieved through its onboard integrated digital open systems architecture; it has been equipped with the Bowman communications system, allowing for data such as targeting and voice communications to be securely and seamlessly transmitted to friendly forces. Some AW159 models have been fitted with various General Dynamics-built mission systems, these include secured data recorders and tactical processing systems which integrate sensor data and application information for displaying within the cockpit as well as for retention within encrypted data storage. Other mission systems used on the Wildcat have been produced by BAE Systems. All variants of the Wildcat share the same defensive aids arrangement, which shares some commonality with the AgustaWestland Apache; features include missile warning sensors, countermeasures dispensers, and infrared exhaust suppressors.

== Operational history ==
=== United Kingdom ===
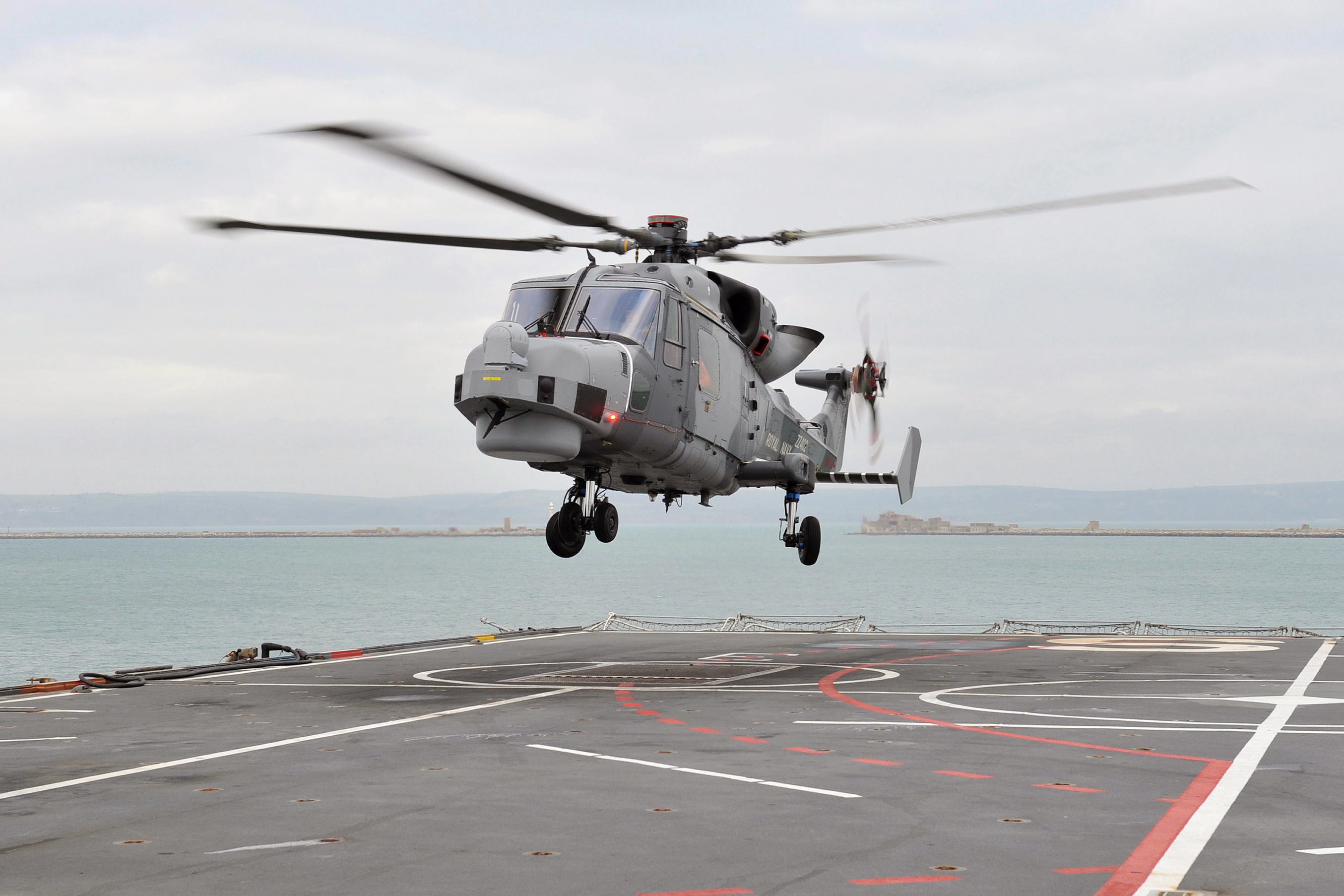
A Wildcat taking off from RFA Argus during trials in 2011

The UK ordered 34 Wildcats for the British Army and 28 for the Royal Navy. The Army Air Corps formed the Wildcat Fielding Team (Army), which later became 652 (Operational Conversion) Squadron, for trials and operational conversion of Joint Helicopter Command, later Joint Aviation Command, aircrew and ground crew to the type. The Royal Navy also commissioned a Wildcat Fielding Squadron, 700W Naval Air Squadron (700W NAS) in 2009. Both units are located at RNAS Yeovilton. In February 2012, a prototype Wildcat (ZZ402) conducted 20 days of trials aboard HMS Iron Duke off the coasts of England and Scotland; the tests involved operating under challenging weather conditions to define ship-helicopter operating limits for when the type would enter service in 2015. During the trials, a total of 390 deck landings were completed, including 148 night landings, 76 of which being conducted by pilots using night vision goggles.

The first production Wildcat was received in May 2012 by the WFT (Army); ZZ406. The Royal Navy received their first airframe at the end of 2013. Further trials of the type were conducted, such as deck landings aboard RFA Mounts Bay. In July 2012, the Wildcat conducted its first public display at the Farnborough International Airshow. At the event, Defence Secretary Philip Hammond stated that the "Wildcat represents a considerable advance over the current Lynx helicopters, bringing greatly improved performance and capability."

On 29 August 2014, the Wildcat AH1 formally entered service with the Army Air Corps. On 23 March 2015, the Royal Navy's first Wildcat HMA2 began its initial operational deployment at sea on board HMS Lancaster. By 2024, all 62 Wildcats had been delivered to the British Army and Royal Navy; in excess of 10,000 flight hours had been logged between the services along with a 100 percent availability rate achieved at sea and over 1,200 deck landings performed. In September 2015, a Wildcat HMA.2 of 825 Naval Air Squadron was deployed aboard HMS Duncan in the Persian Gulf to perform extreme high temperature trials.

On 4 July 2019, Royal Marines from 42 Commando unit used a Wildcat to board and detain the Grace 1 oil tanker off Gibraltar.

The British Government's 2026 defence investment plan (DIP) envisages the withdrawal of the Wildcat helicopter from service and its replacement with autonomous systems. The HMA2 maritime variant of the Wildcat is projected to be replaced by unspecified drones between 2030 and 2035 while the reconnaissance AH1 variant is projected to be retired from 2027 with no confirmed timeline for its replacement by autonomous systems.

=== South Korea ===
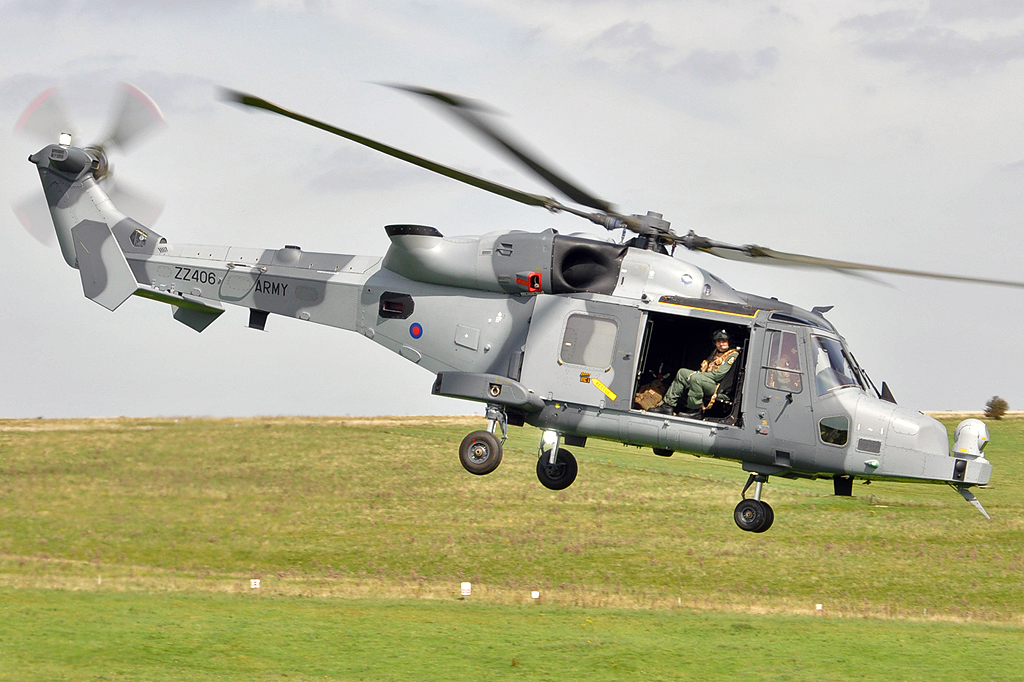
ZZ406, the first production Wildcat delivered to the AAC in May 2012

On 15 January 2013, South Korea's Defense Acquisition Program Administration announced the selection of the AW159 to fulfill a requirement of the Republic of Korea Navy for a maritime helicopter, winning against the MH-60R Seahawk. The batch of eight aircraft were chosen to perform search-and-rescue missions, anti-submarine warfare and surveillance. In January 2014, DAPA announced it will equip its Wildcat helicopters with Spike NLOS missiles to provide a stand-off attack capability for engaging targets such as ground artillery and small vessels. In April 2015, the South Korean government was considering ordering a further 12 Wildcats to further strengthen the Navy's anti-submarine capabilities; alternative options include the MH-60 Seahawk and the domestically produced KAI KUH-1 Surion helicopter. On 13 June 2016, the Republic of Korea Navy took delivery of four Wildcats. The helicopters operate from the Navy's Incheon-class guided missile/coastal defense frigates. The remaining four were delivered in late November 2016. ROK Navy Wildcats are fitted with a Seaspray 7400E radar offering 360-degree coverage.

The first four AW159s were operational by February 2017. Its AESA radar and electro-optic thermal sensor are capable of detecting surface contacts out to 360 km (220 mi; 190 nmi). For anti-submarine duties, the helicopter can operate for over three hours when equipped with the Thales FLASH dipping sonar, two hours with the sonar and one Blue Shark torpedo, and an hour or more with the sonar and two torpedoes; it can also drop sonobuoys.

=== Philippines ===
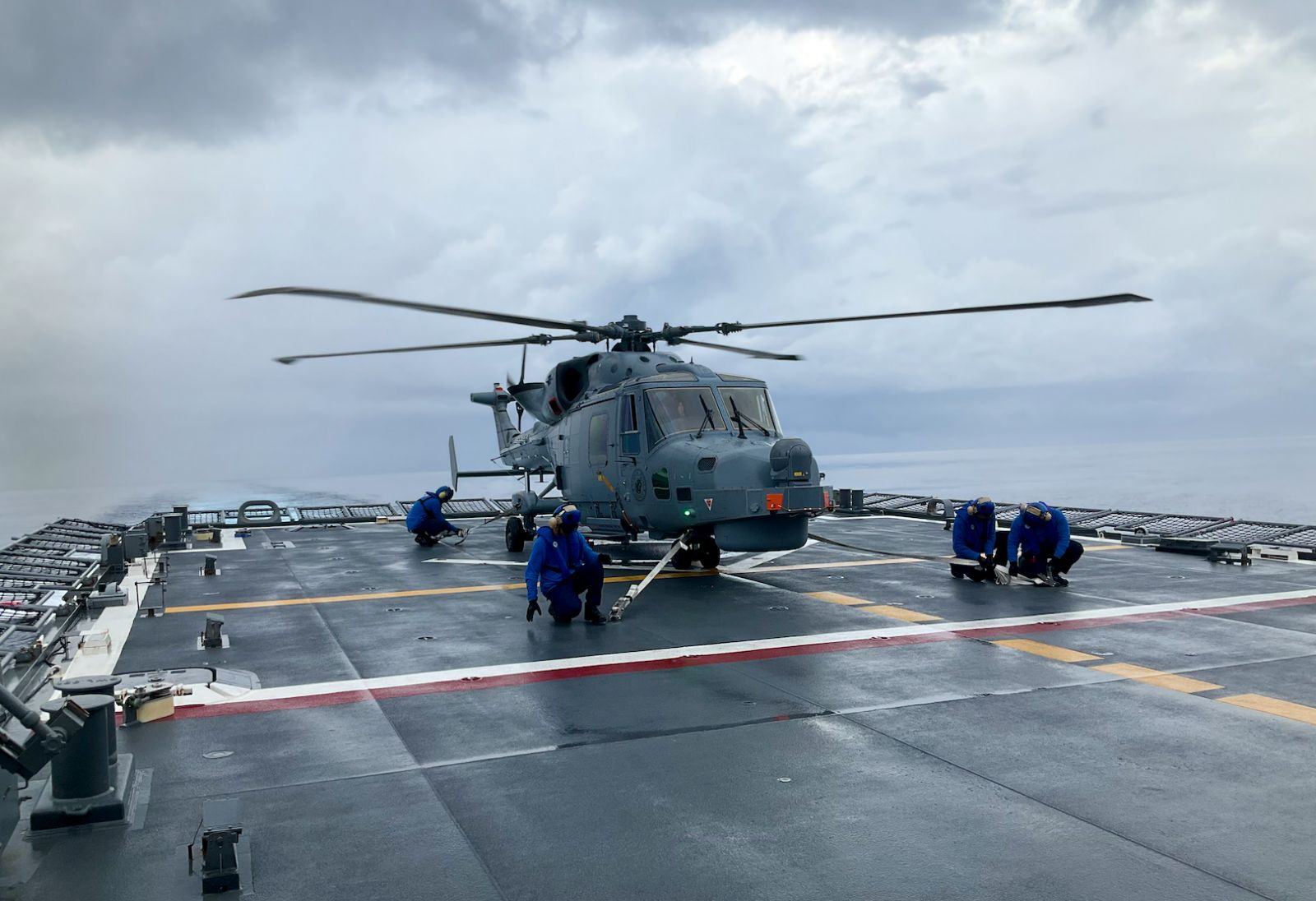
Philippine Navy's AW-159 Wildcat on board the BRP Antonio Luna FF-151.

In 2014, it was reported that the AW159 was being considered by the Philippine Navy. In March 2016, AgustaWestland signed a €100 million contract with the Department of National Defense for two helicopters along with training and support. The project aims to provide anti-submarine warfare (ASW) and anti-surface capabilities to the Navy. Prior to the introduction of the Wildcat, the Philippines lacked any ASW capabilities in a region where the number of submarines being operated by other nations was reportedly set to grow.

On 7 May 2019, the two AW159 anti-submarine helicopters arrived in the Philippines. The helicopters are purchased as units assigned on board the Jose Rizal-class Frigates.

=== Bids ===
In 2016, Malaysia reportedly considering increasing the number of helicopters operated by the Royal Malaysian Navy by procuring either the AW159, Sikorsky MH-60R Seahawk or the Airbus Helicopters H225M. On 20 April 2016, Finmeccanica (now Leonardo) signed a teaming agreement with Global Komited, a Malaysian defence company, to jointly promote and distribute the AW159 Wildcat to the Malaysian government.

In 2024 Leonardo signed MoUs with a range of companies in New Zealand around the potential supply of AW159 helicopters to the New Zealand Defence Force. At the time, the NZDF was aiming to replace its eight remaining Super Seasprite helicopters with ASW & ASuW capable helicopters in the late 2020s. In August 2025 the New Zealand government selected MH-60R Seahawk helicopters to fill this requirement.

== Variants ==
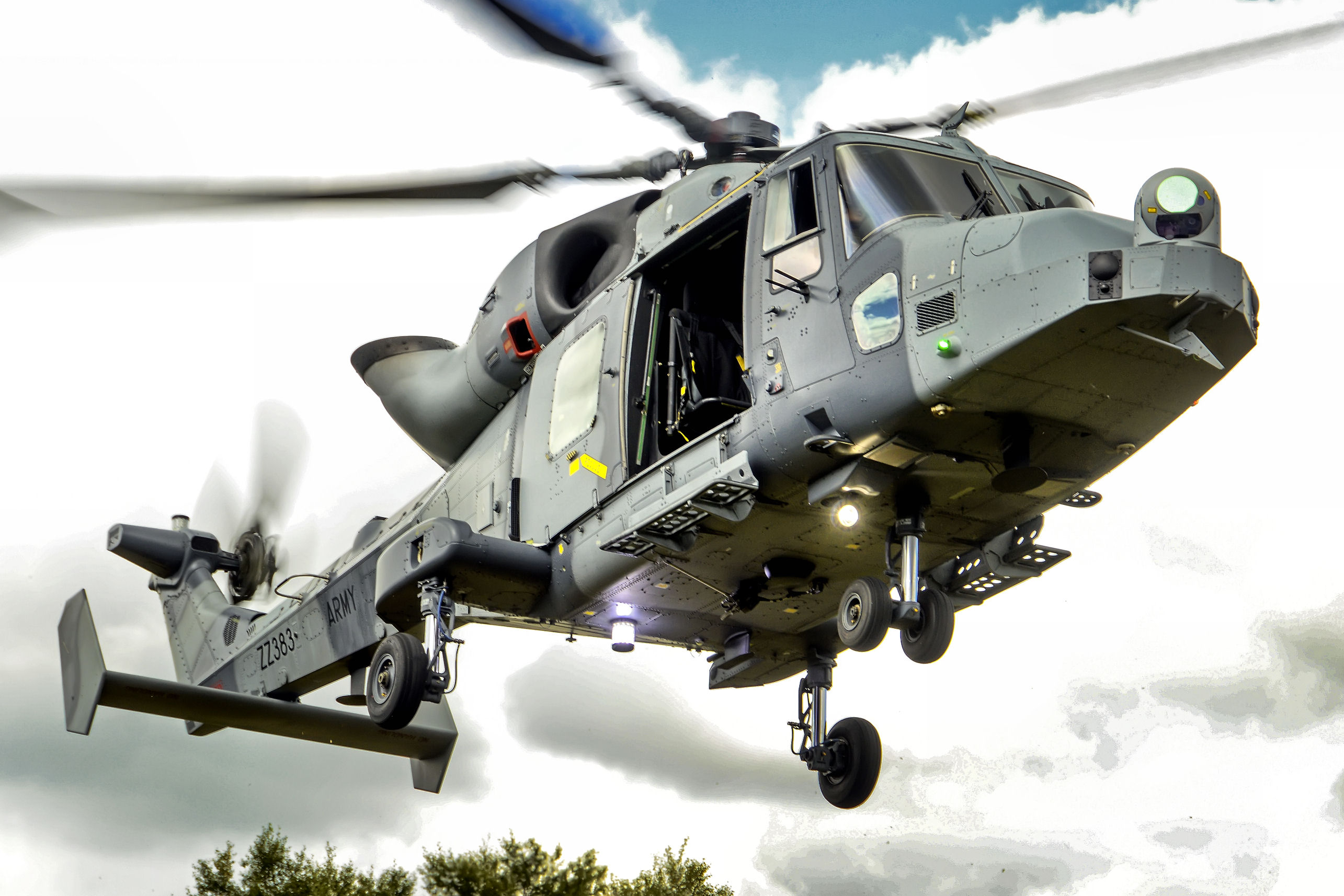
Wildcat AH1 of British Army Air Corps 652(OC) Sqn

Wildcat AH1
Initial battlefield reconnaissance model, total of 34 ordered for the Army Air Corps.
Wildcat HMA2
Initial maritime model, total of 28 ordered for the Royal Navy.

== Operators ==
=== Current operators ===
Philippines

- Philippine Navy: 2 AW159s in service with 6 more on order.
  - 42nd Anti Submarine Helicopter Squadron

South Korea

- Republic of Korea Navy: 8 AW159s in service
  - 62nd Maritime Helicopter Group
    - 622 Flight Squadron
    - 627 Flight Squadron

United Kingdom

- Army Air Corps: 34 AH1 in service
  - 1 Regiment
    - 652 Squadron
    - 659 Squadron
    - 661 Squadron
- Royal Navy: 28 HMA2 in service
  - 815 Naval Air Squadron
  - 825 Naval Air Squadron
  - 847 Naval Air Squadron

=== Future operators ===
Algeria

- Algerian Navy (3 on order)

== Specifications (AW159) ==
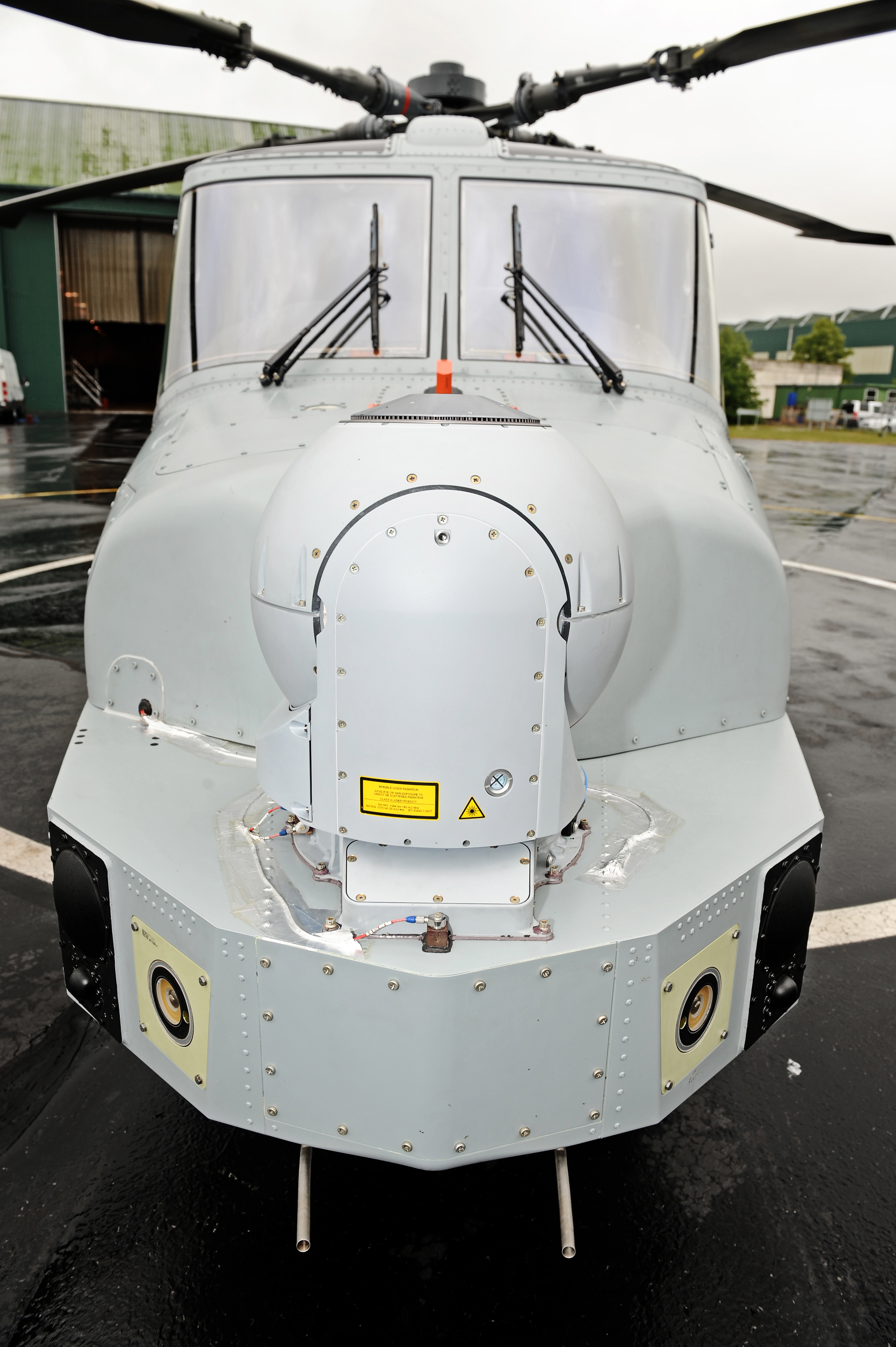
Head-on view of an AW159 Wildcat. Note the nose-mounted optical sensor which is stowed so the window is not seen.

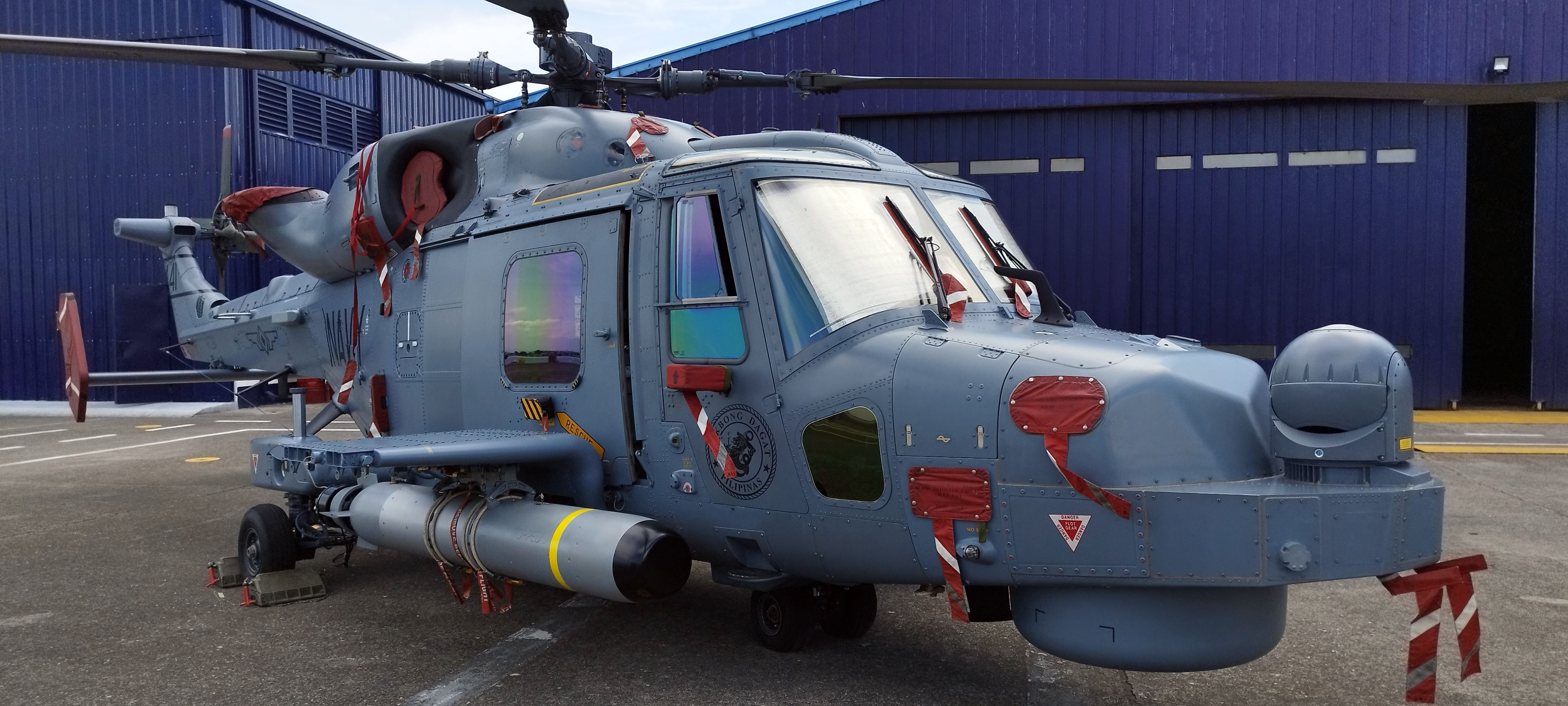
AW159 Wildcat helicopter of the Philippine Navy armed with K745 Blue Shark torpedoes taken at the Philippine Fleet Defense Expo (PFDX) 2023

External videos
- Inflight video of AW159

Data from AgustaWestland

General characteristics

- Crew: 2 pilots
- Capacity: 6 passengers, including door gunner
- Length: 15.24 m (50 ft 0 in)
- Height: 3.73 m (12 ft 3 in)
- Empty weight: 3,300 kg (7,275 lb)
- Max takeoff weight: 6,000 kg (13,228 lb)
- Powerplant: 2 × LHTEC CTS800-4N turboshaft, 1,015 kW (1,361 hp) each
- Main rotor diameter: 12.8 m (42 ft 0 in)
- Main rotor area: 128.7 m^{2} (1,385 sq ft)

Performance

- Maximum speed: 311 km/h (193 mph, 168 kn)
- Range: 777 km (483 mi, 420 nmi)
- Ferry range: 963 km (598 mi, 520 nmi)
- Endurance: Two hours and 15 minutes (Four hours and 30 minutes with auxiliary fuel tanks)

Armament

- Pintle-mounted machine gun, e.g. FN MAG (Army) or Browning M3M (Navy).

Air-to-surface missile systems and ASW weapons (Naval HMA2 variant):

- up to 20× Thales Martlet (Lightweight Multirole Missile), formerly Future Anti-Surface Guided Weapon (Light). or
- up to 4× MBDA Sea Venom, formerly Future Anti-Surface Guided Weapon (Heavy), to disable or destroy vessels up to 1000 tonnes (initial operating capability from October 2025; projected for full operating capability in 2026). or
- Sting Ray torpedo and Mk.11 depth charges. (sub-surface targeting for U.K. HMA2 variant provided by other platforms)

South Korean and Philippine naval loadout

- K745 Blue Shark torpedoes
- Spike NLOS ATGM-based antiship missiles

Avionics

- Thales Underwater Systems Compact FLASH dipping sonar array (not deployed on U.K. HMA2 variant)
- Seaspray 7400E AESA X band air-to-surface multifunction radar
- Wescam MX-15Di EOIR cameras
- Sonobuoys (not deployed on U.K. HMA2 variant)
- TDL-16 (?)

== See also ==
Related development

- Westland Lynx/Super Lynx
- Westland 30

Aircraft of comparable role, configuration, and era

- Sikorsky SH-60 Seahawk
- Bell UH-1Y Venom
- Eurocopter AS565 Panther
- HAL Dhruv
- Kaman SH-2G Super Seasprite
- NH90
- Airbus Helicopters H175
- Ka-52K "Katran"

Related lists

- List of active United Kingdom military aircraft
- List of aircraft of the Army Air Corps (United Kingdom)
