= Sea Venom (missile) =

Sea Venom Anti-Navire Léger
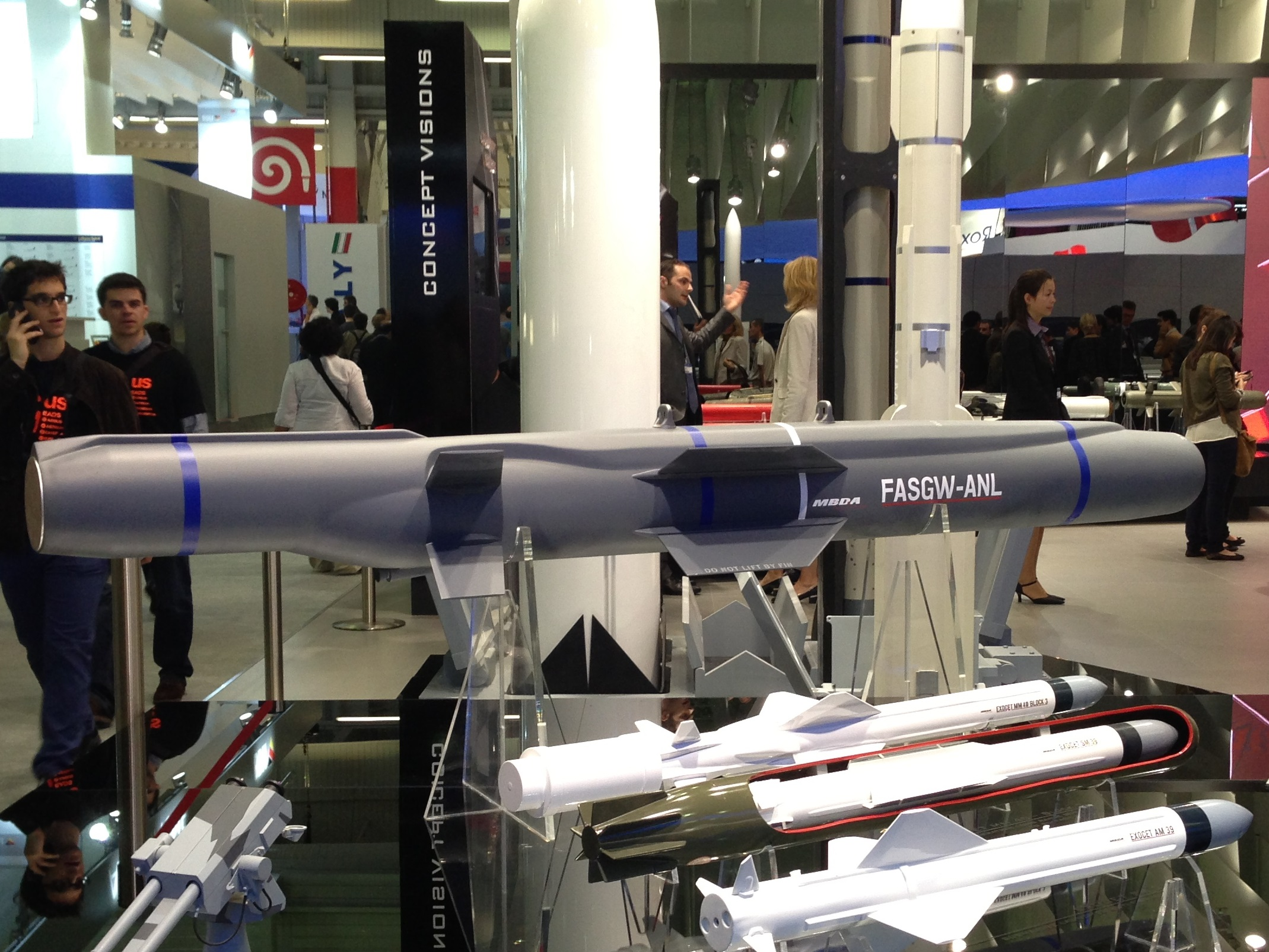
- Type: Anti-ship missile
- Place of origin: United Kingdom; France

Service history
- In service: October 2025 (initial operating capability); 2026 (projected full operating capability)
- Used by: Royal Navy; French Navy (undergoing trials)

Production history
- Manufacturer: MBDA

Specifications
- Mass: 120 kg (260 lb)
- Length: 2.5 m (8 ft 2 in)
- Diameter: 200 mm (7.9 in)
- Warhead: HE semi‐armour piercing blast/fragmentation
- Warhead weight: 30 kg (66 lb)
- Detonation mechanism: Impact, time delay
- Engine: Two‐stage solid‐propellant rocket motor
- Operational range: > 20 km (11 nmi; 12 mi)
- Maximum speed: Mach 0.85 (289 m/s; 949 ft/s; 1,040 km/h)
- Guidance system: INS, IIR
- Launch platform: AgustaWestland AW159 Wildcat; Eurocopter AS565 Panther; NHIndustries NH90; Airbus H160M
- References: Janes

Sea Venom is an Anglo-French lightweight anti-ship missile developed by MBDA to equip the French Navy and the Royal Navy. The missile is known as Anti-Navire Léger (ANL) in France and Sea Venom (formerly "Future Anti-Surface Guided Weapon (Heavy)") in the United Kingdom. While initial operating capability had been expected with the Royal Navy in 2022, it was reported in 2023 that, due to "on-going integration challenges", the Royal Navy's Wildcat helicopters would only achieve full operational capability with the missile in 2026. The first test launch, from an AS365 Dauphin helicopter of the French DGA, was successfully conducted on 21 June 2017.

Initial operating capability for the missile with the Royal Navy was declared in October 2025.

== Design ==
Sea Venom is designed as a successor to the French Navy's AS 15 TT and Royal Navy's Sea Skua missiles. When in service, Sea Venom will equip Eurocopter Panther and NH90 helicopters in the French Navy and Wildcat helicopters in the Royal Navy. Due to shared characteristics with its predecessors, MBDA claims Sea Venom will be able to readily integrate onto platforms that are already carrying Sea Skua and AS 15 TT.

Much like its predecessors, Sea Venom is designed to attack surface targets, such as fast in-shore attack craft ranging in size of between 50 and 500 tonnes, as well as larger surface targets of up to corvette size. With its 30 kg warhead, the missile is also capable of inflicting significant damage to larger vessels through precision aim point selection, and can also attack static land-based targets. Whilst its precise range is currently unknown, MBDA has stated that the missile has a "long" stand-off range enabling it to be launched from beyond the reach of most modern air defence systems. The missile is capable of several attack modes including sea skimming and "pop up/top attack." Sea Venom uses an infrared seeker with the option of "person in the loop" track-via-missile guidance via data-link; the high speed two-way data-link transmits the images "seen" by the seeker back to the operator, enabling them to remain in control of the missile throughout its flight in addition to having an autonomous engagement capability.

MBDA is also working on a surface-launched variant of the missile.

== History ==
The Royal Navy declared Sea Venom an initial operating capability in May 2021 when it deployed them as part of the United Kingdom Carrier Strike Group 21 on its maiden deployment to the Pacific. The missile equipped four Wildcat HMA2 helicopters embarked on the strike group's accompanying destroyers. However, in 2023 it was reported that integration challenges were ongoing and, as a result, full operating capability would be delayed until 2026. In October 2024, a Royal Navy Wildcat helicopter conducted a test-firing of the missile.

The British share of the lifetime cost of the system was given as £945 million in 2022.

== See also ==
- Martlet (missile) - the "Future Anti-Surface Guided Weapon (Light)" equivalent
