= Eurocopter AS565 Panther =

Military utility helicopter

AS565 Panther
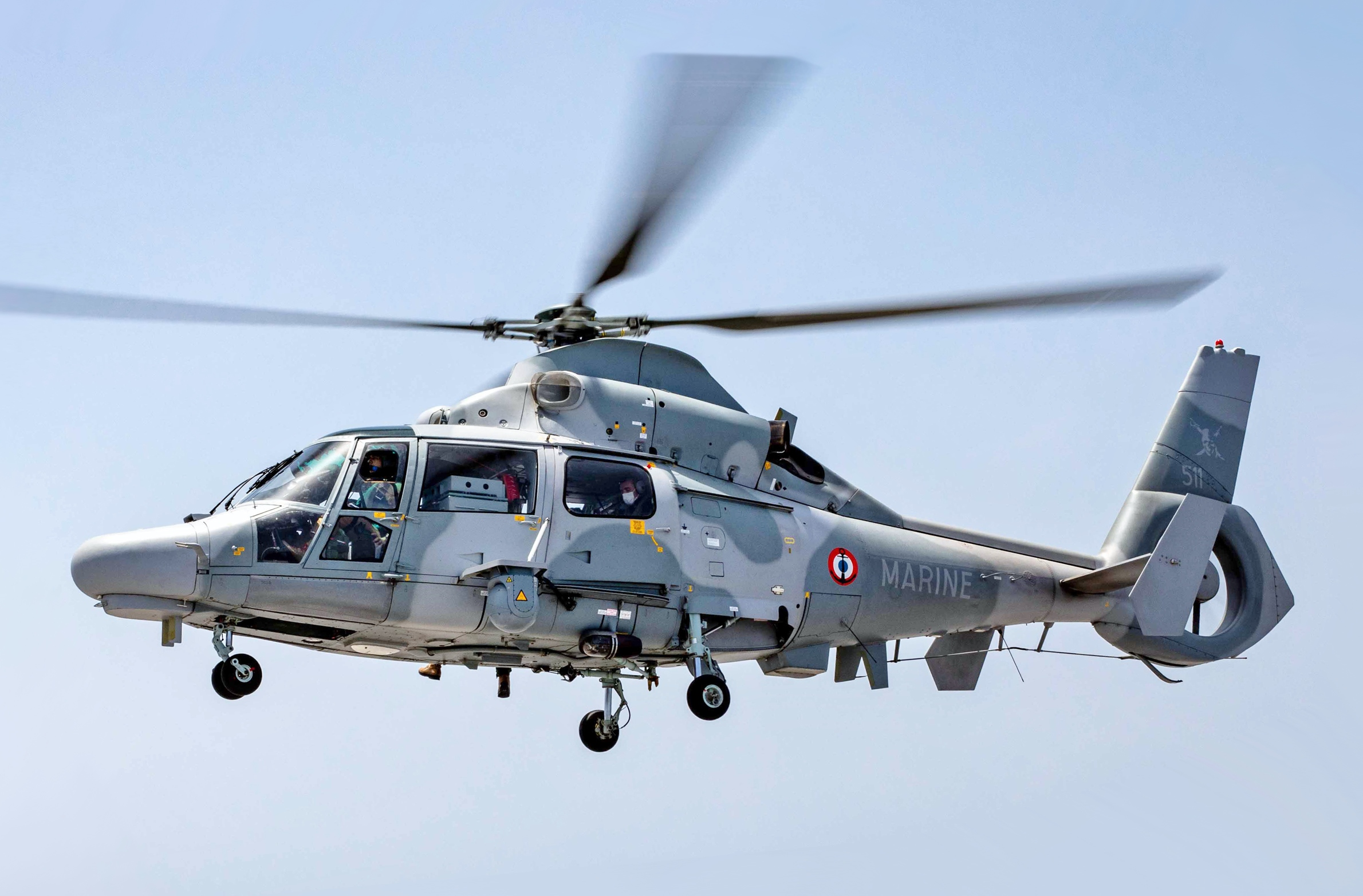
- An AS565 Panther of the French Navy

General information
- Type: utility military helicopter
- National origin: France
- Manufacturer: Aérospatiale; Eurocopter; Airbus Helicopters
- Status: In service
- Primary users: French Naval Aviation Brazilian Army; Israeli Air Force; Indonesian Navy

History
- Manufactured: 1984–2021
- Introduction date: 1986
- First flight: 28 February 1984
- Developed from: Eurocopter AS365 Dauphin
- Variant: Harbin Z-9

The Airbus Helicopters AS565 Panther (formerly Eurocopter AS565 Panther) is the military version of the Airbus Helicopters AS365 Dauphin medium-weight multi-purpose twin-engine helicopter. The Panther is used for a wide range of military roles, including combat assault, fire support, anti-submarine warfare, anti-surface warfare, search and rescue, and medical evacuation.

== Development ==
During the 1980s, French aerospace firm Aerospatiale decided to develop a purpose-built military version of their Eurocopter AS365 Dauphin. The civil SA365 N variant of the Dauphin was used as the starting point for the project; the new rotorcraft was designed to perform utility, anti-tank, troop-transport, and maritime operations. On 28 February 1984, the military variant prototype, designated as the AS365M and later named Panther, conducted its first flight. A total of three prototypes were built.

In May 1986, Aerospatiale formally launched production of the AS365M, at which point the firm anticipated more than 400 Panthers to be sold in the long term. The first production model, which was initially designated as the AS365 K, was shortly re-designated and became widely known as the AS565 Panther. Early models were powered by a pair of Turbomeca Arriel 1M1 turboshaft engines; in 1995, Eurocopter began offering higher powered versions of the Panther that used the new Turbomeca Arriel 2C engine instead.

In February 2016, Airbus Helicopters promised to relocate the global production line for the AS565 Panther to India if it is selected by the Indian Navy for a proposed utility helicopter acquisition. In April 2016, the production rate of the AS565 Panther was announced to have been substantially increased following a switch from a static production line to a task flow line, as well as a 30 per cent reduction in component lead times.

== Design ==
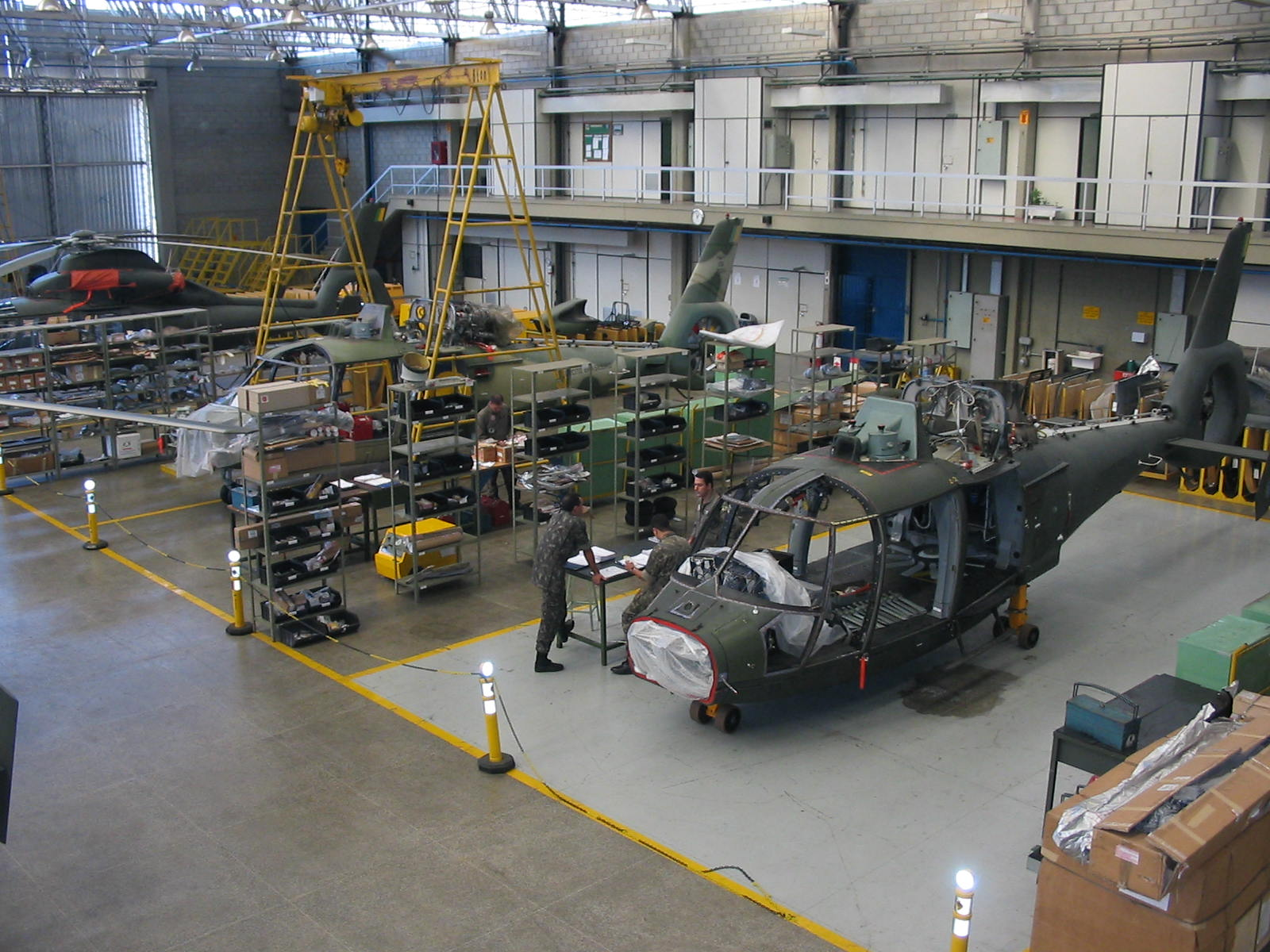
Multiple Helibras HM-1 Pantera in various states of assembly in Brazil, 2004

The AS565 Panther is a twin-engine medium-sized multi-mission rotorcraft. It is capable of performing various naval and land-based missions, such as maritime security, search and rescue (SAR), casualty evacuation (CASEVAC), vertical replenishment, surveillance, special forces operations, anti-submarine warfare (ASW) and Anti-surface warfare (ASuW). The Panther is powered by a pair of Turbomeca Arriel turboshaft engines, which drives the rotorcraft's main rotor as well as the fenestron anti-torque tail rotor device. The flight profile of the Panther has been described as being easy to manoeuver, possessing generous g-force limitations and a high level of stability.

In the commando-transport configuration, the Panther may carry up to 10 fully armed soldiers on board at a time in addition to the two pilots flying the aircraft. The main cabin can be rapidly reconfigured to conduct various roles, such as troop-transport, SAR, and MEDIVAC missions; optional equipment includes a full medical suite, forward-looking infrared (FLIR) camera, emergency flotation, loudspeaker, variable-speed hoist, cargo sling, search light, and a stretcher-support structure.

Various avionics are present upon the Panther; some variants are fitted with the advanced human-machine interface (HMI) glass cockpit. It features the vehicle and engine multifunction display (VEMD), integrated electronic standby instrument (ESI), usage monitoring system (UMS), traffic collision avoidance system (TCAS), terrain awareness and warning system (H-TAWS), and dedicated mission display coupled with a multi-sensor processor, a 4-axis automatic flight control system (AFCS), flight management system (FMS), and an advanced search radar. The design of the cockpit and avionics systems, such as the engine management system, provides a high level of automation as part of an effort to reduce workload upon the pilots. The cockpit was deliberately designed with extra panel space to accommodate future upgrades and additional instrumentation that may be installed.

The principle element of ASW-configured Panthers is the Helicopter Long-Range Active Sonar (HELRAS), a dipping sonar equipped with a descending array of seven projection elements and a receiving array equipped with eight extending arms, which is capable of detecting submarines up to 500 meters below the water's surface. According to Airbus Helicopters, the Panther family has been qualified to operate from the flight decks of over 100 classes of NATO vessels, and complies with NATO standardization agreements. The compact size of the Panther has enabled the type to be operated from smaller ocean-going vessels such as corvettes. To aid in shipboard landings under rough sea conditions and high winds, some variants can be furnished with the hydraulic Harpoon deck-lock securing device.

The Panther can be armed with several different sets of munitions and armaments, dependent upon the intended role. Munitions include 20mm pod-mounted cannons, 68mm rocket pods, a maximum of eight Mistral air-to-air missiles, or a maximum of eight HOT anti-tank missiles; all of which can be mounted onto a universal weapon support beam. The weapon systems are integrated with a Crouzet HDH-2A electronic sight and the autopilot, the latter of which provides automatic flight handling assistance during weapons deployment to avoid negative tendencies such as nose droop. For improved survivability, the radar signature is reduced due to the use of composite materials across the airframe and the use of the fenestron tail rather than a conventional tail rotor; low infrared paints are also typically applied to the exterior surfaces and jet exhaust dilution devices are installed on the engines to reduce the Panther's infrared signature. Damage resistance is increased by the adoption of self-sealing fuel tanks and armor-plated crew seating.

== Operational history ==
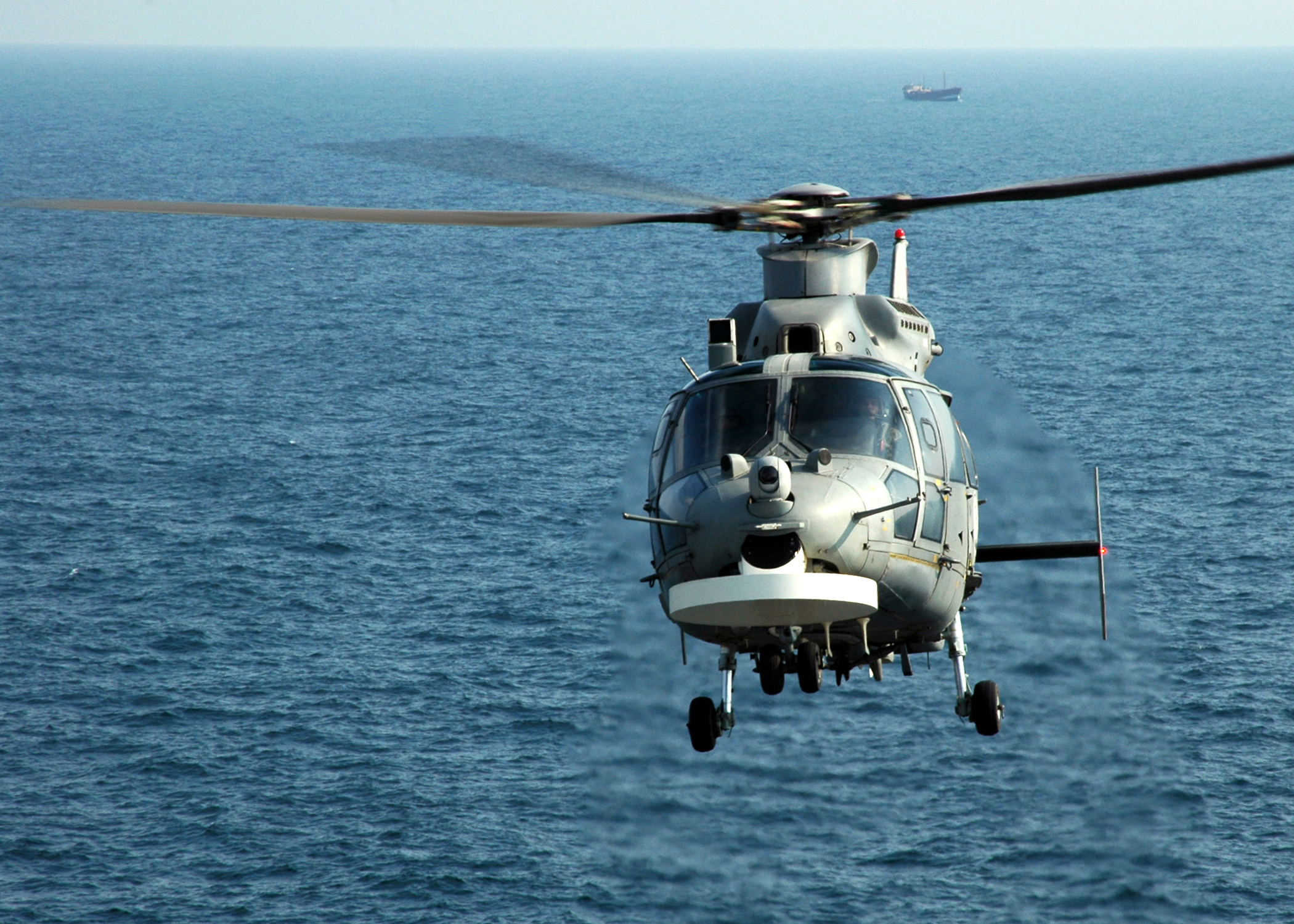
Panther in flight; note the surface search radome under the nose

The French Naval Aviation took delivery of 15 Panthers between 1993 and 1998 for maritime operations. As a response to increasing acts of piracy in the Gulf of Aden, since 2008, Panthers have been routinely dispatched upon multiple French frigates that have conducted deployments in support of Operation Atalanta, a long term pan-European counter-piracy operation. In the Aden, the Panther has been typically used for maritime patrol, surveillance and troop-transport missions, such as the transportation of strike teams and the retrieval of detainees.

In May 2009, France announced a major mid-life upgrade program for the Aeronavale's Panther fleet, focused on cockpit upgrades and improved defensive/offensive equipment. The additions and alterations include a new glass cockpit compatible with night vision goggles (NVG), electro-optical sensors, a new anti-jamming radio, Link 11 data-link, and a self-protection system based on that used on the Eurocopter Tiger. On 31 May 2011, the first of 16 Standard 2 Panthers was delivered back to the French Navy.

In 1988, Brazil's Army Aviation took delivery of its first Panther helicopter, which was produced locally by Helibras. In January 2010, Helibras was awarded a contact to upgrade 34 AS365K Panthers to the new AS365 K2 standard. Changes on the Panther K2 include new Turbomeca Arriel 2C2CG engines which produce 40% more power, a glass cockpit containing new avionics and radio systems, a four-axis autopilot, a new weather radar, NVG-compatibility, and measures to reduce pilot workload, and shall extend the airframe's service life for a further 25 years. In March 2014, the first two Panther K2 rotorcraft were delivered to the Brazilian Army. In September 2014, the Panther K2 passed its technical operation evaluation, having reportedly demonstrated a 98% availability rating throughout the trial period, clearing the way for the full modernisation program to proceed.

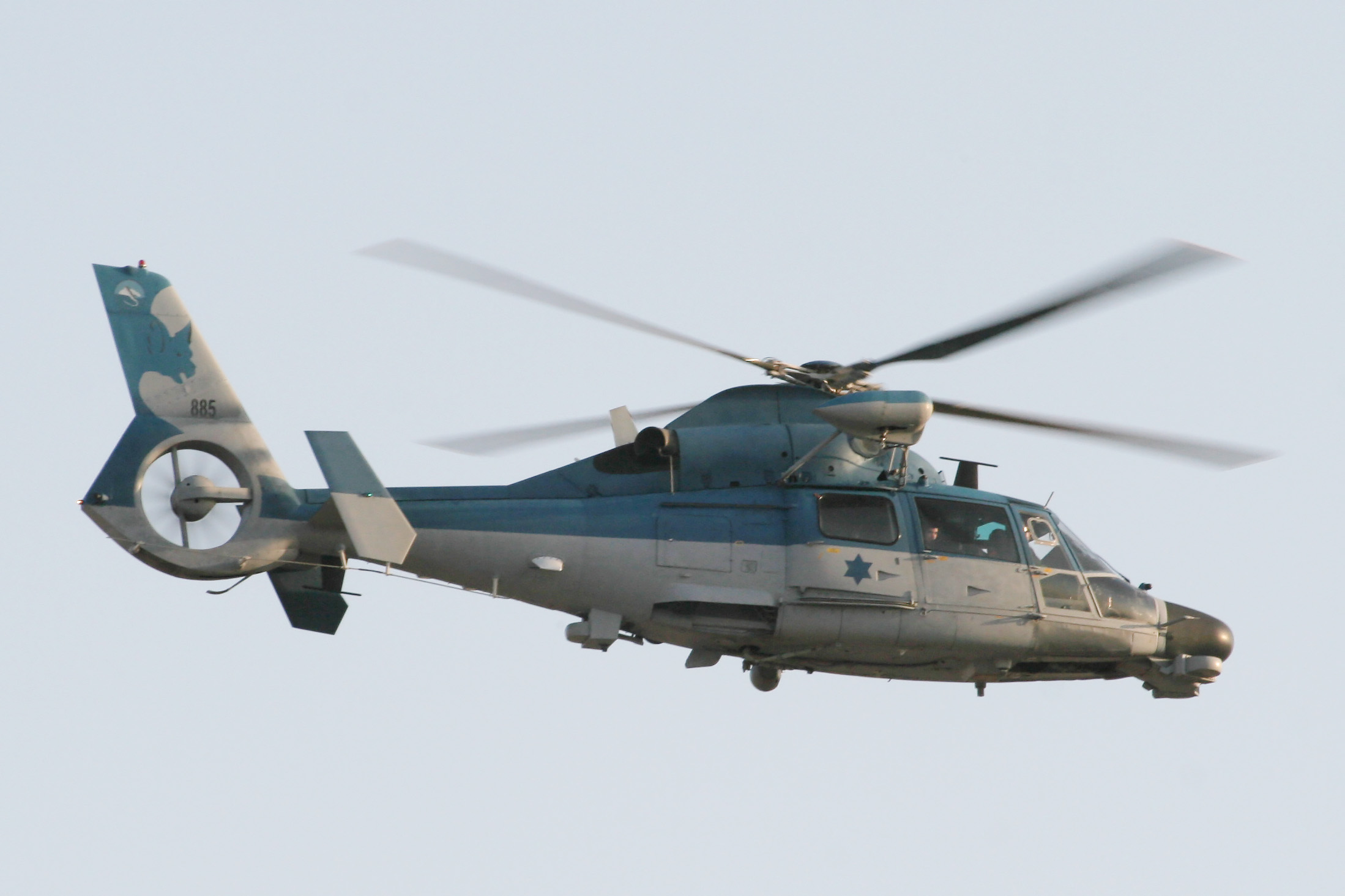
Israeli AS565MA Atalef, 2007

Following positive experiences of operating a pair of Aerospatiale SA366G Dauphins, the Israeli Air Force opted to procure five AS565MA helicopters, locally designated as Atalef. Their mission is to extend the naval reach of Israel's defense forces, they can be deployed on board the Israeli Navy's Sa'ar 5-class corvettes when required; the rotorcraft are equipped with long range sensors to identify targets in the Mediterranean and a datalink to convey sensory data to the corvettes, their combined sensory capability has reportedly helped foil several attempted terrorist attacks. The AS565MA is the only rotorcraft in Israeli service capable of locating people at sea during day or night conditions, and can operate in nearly all sea conditions.

During the Gulf War, the Royal Saudi Navy engaged five Iraqi patrol boats using a number of Panther helicopters, a total of 15 AS 15 TT Anti-ship missiles were fired. As of 2015, more than 250 navalised variants of the AS 565MB Panther have been in service with operators across 20 nations.

In 2014, the Indonesian Navy opted to procure 11 ASW-equipped Panthers through Indonesian Aerospace (PTDI); Airbus Helicopters shall produce the base rotorcraft and deliver them to PTDI's facility in Bandung, Indonesia and separately install mission systems such as the ASW suite. In the Asian market, the European-built Panther has had limited sales mainly due to export competition from the Chinese-built Harbin Z-9, itself a license-built derivative of the Dauphin alike to the Panther.

== Variants ==
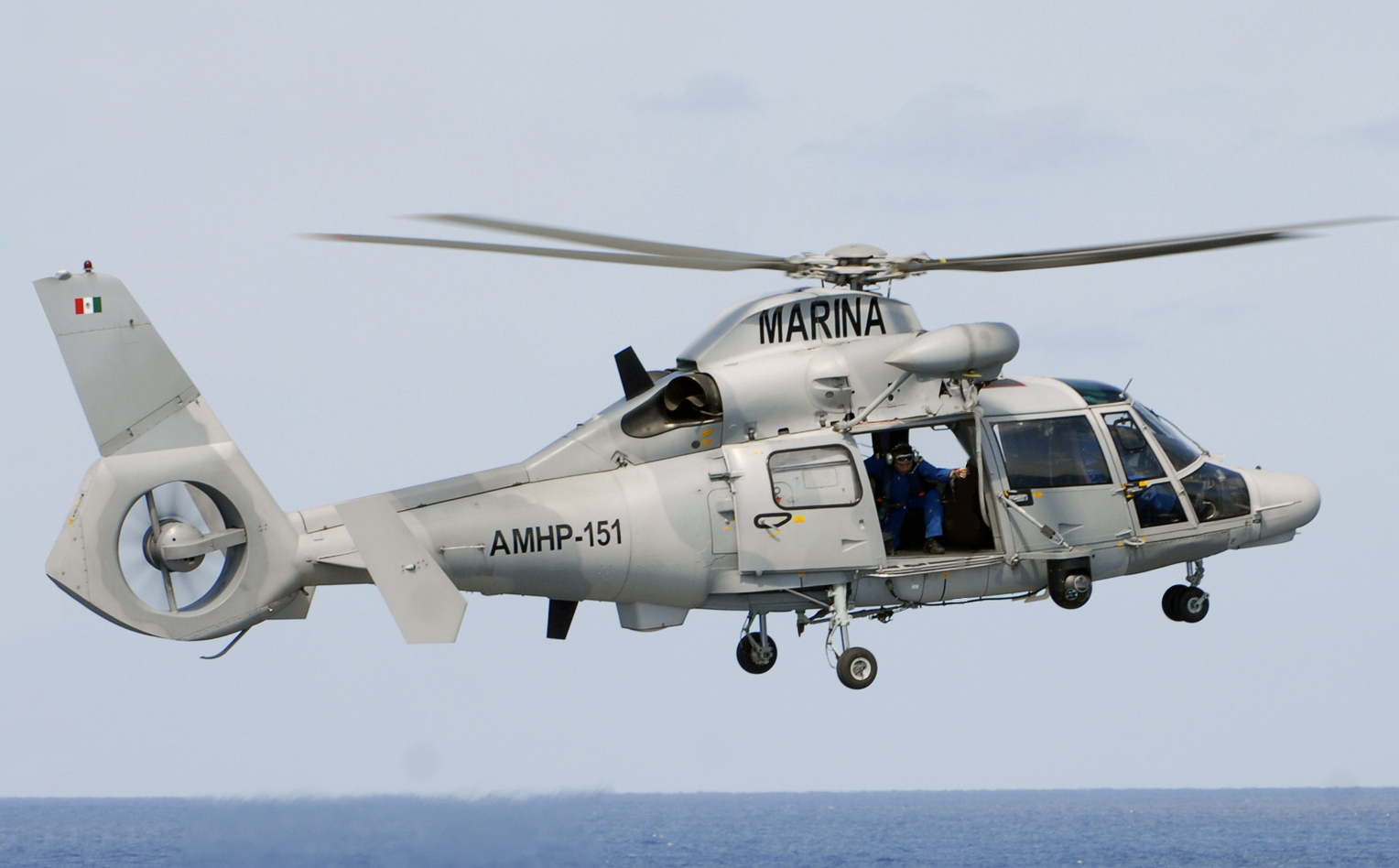
A Mexican marine AS565 hovers over the deck of Frankfurt Am Main during multi-national exercise

SA 365M Panther
Prototype military variant first flown on 29 February 1984.

SA 365 FK
Original designation of SA 365 K.

SA 365 K
The first version of the Panther, based on the AS365 N2. Offered with various armaments, including podded Giat M621 20 mm cannon, 2.75 in Forges de Zeebrugge (FZ) rockets (in pods of 19) or 68mm Thales Brandt rockets (in pods of 22).

AS565 UA
Unarmed military utility variant for reconnaissance, transportation and search and rescue. Can use either Arriel 1M1 or 2C turboshaft engines.
AS565 UB
Utility version of the AS365 N3, currently in production. This version is powered by two Turbomeca Arriel 2C turboshafts, which are equipped with full authority digital engine control (FADEC). The main missions of this version are transport of 8 to 10 fully equipped troops, casualty evacuation and logistic support.

AS565 AA
Armed military battlefield variant, can be armed with air-to-air weapons including 20-mm canon pods, rockets or up to eight Mistral air-to-air missiles. Can use either Arriel 1M1 or 2C turboshaft engines.

AS565 AB
Attack version of the AS365 N3.

AS565 MA
Multi-purpose unarmed naval variant for maritime patrol, search & rescue (fitted with a hoist) or a surveillance. Can use either Arriel 1M1 or 2C turboshaft engines.

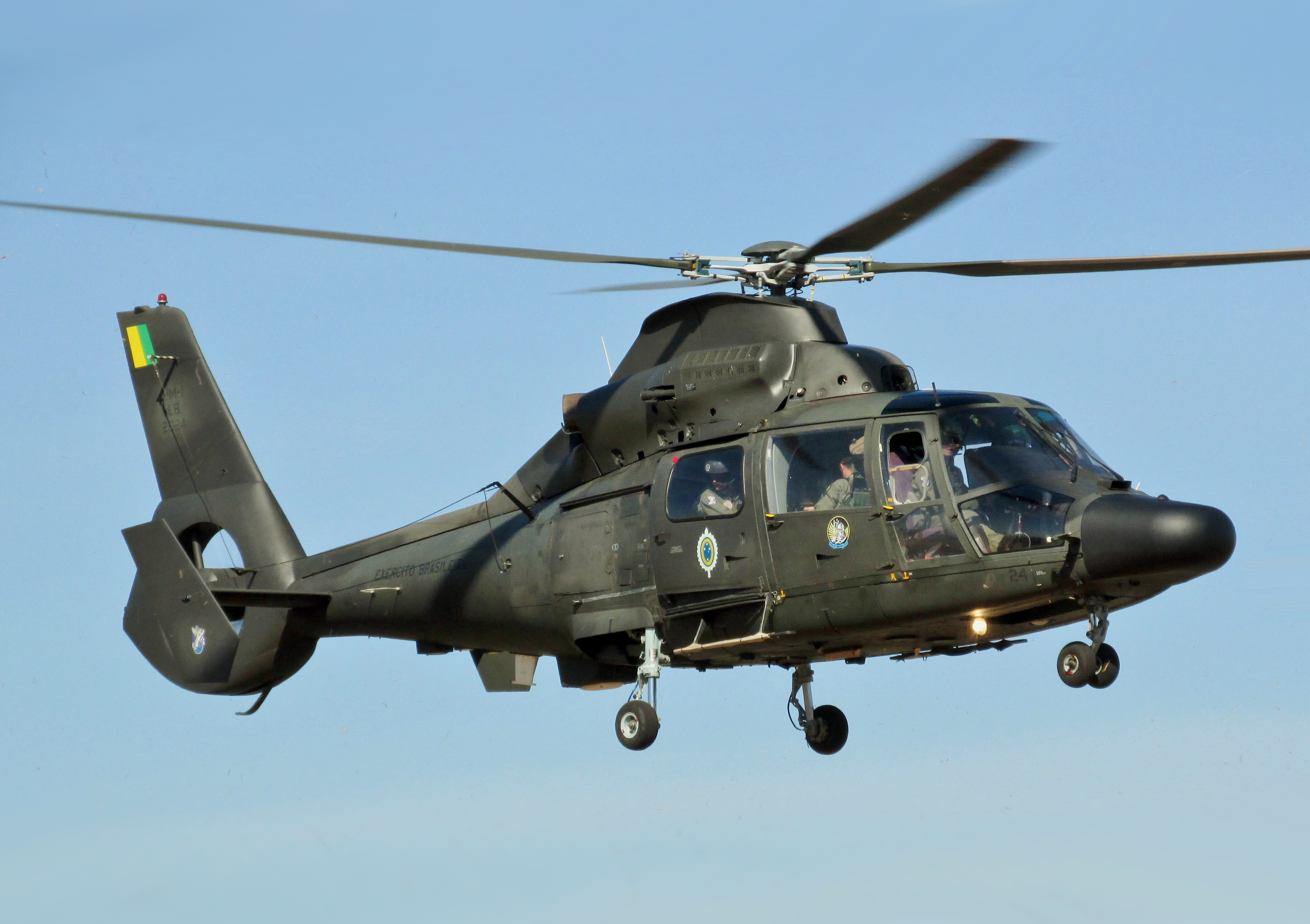
A Brazilian Army Panther

AS565 MB
Maritime transport and search & rescue version of the AS365 N3. Offered with various armaments, including cabin-mounted 20mm cannon, AS 15 TT anti-ship missile, Mark 46 torpedo and Whitehead A.244/S torpedo.

AS565 SA
Multi-purpose armed naval variant for anti-submarine warfare using either Sonar or MAD, search and rescue and surveillance roles. Can use either Arriel 1M1 or 2C turboshaft engines.

AS565 SB
Surveillance and ASuW version of the AS365 N3.

AS565 CA
Armed military anti-armour variant with roof-mounted sight and HOT missiles. Can use either Arriel 1M1 or 2C turboshaft engines.

AS565 N3
Maritime patrol and surveillance version of the AS365 N3 for the Hellenic Coast Guard

AS565 SC
Search and rescue version for Saudi Arabia.

AS565 MBe
Improved MB with an increased payload, folding main rotors and tailfin, Arriel 2N engines and new avionics. Initially for the Mexican Navy.

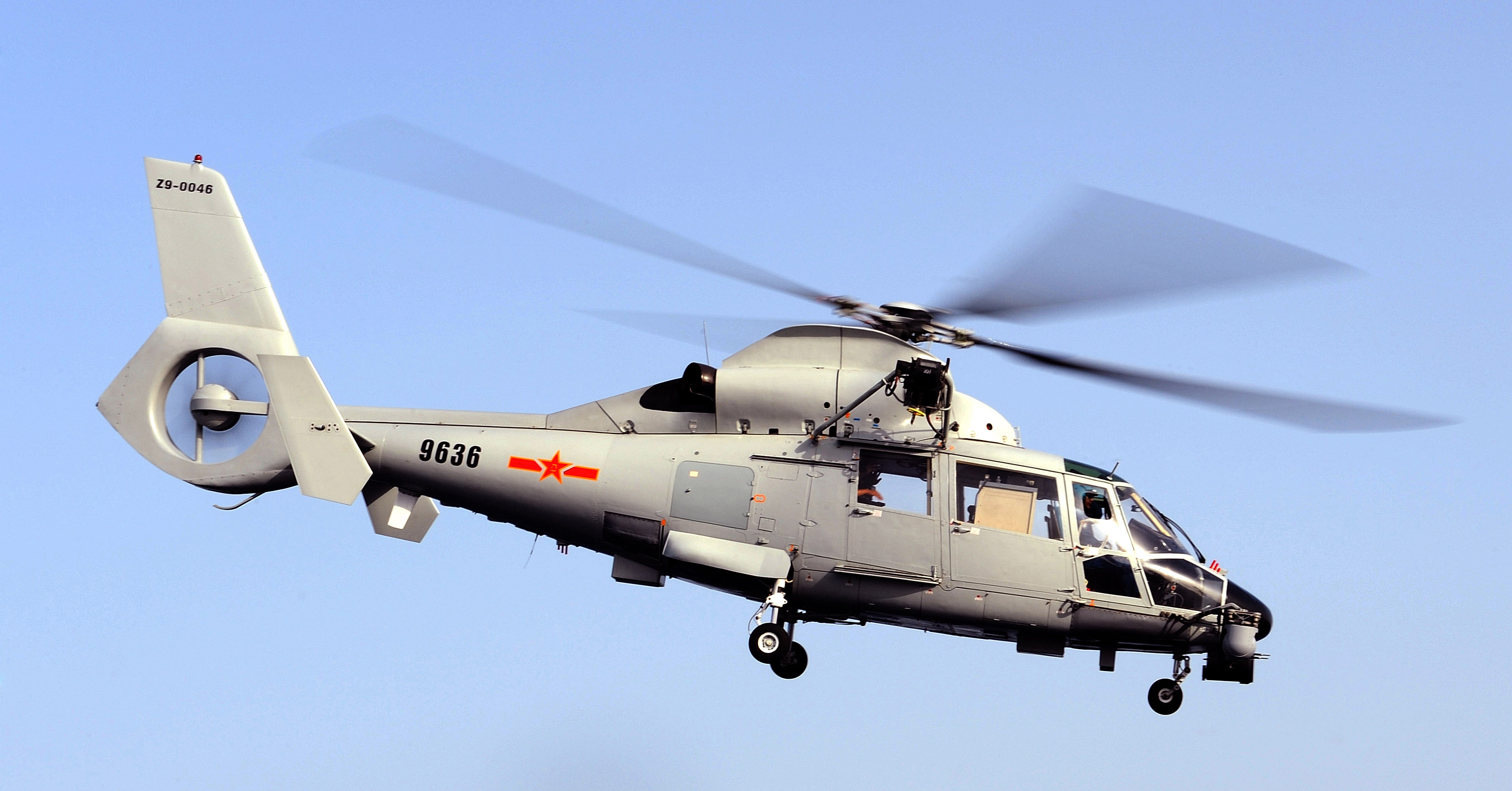
A Chinese Harbin Z-9 lands on HMS Cornwall

HM-1 Pantera
Based on the AS565 AA, manufactured by Airbus Helicopters subsidiary Helibras for the Brazilian Army.

Panther 800
Version offered for the US Army's Light Utility Helicopter program as a replacement for the UH-1 Huey, with 2 LHTEC T800 turboshafts. Test flown only.

Harbin Z-9
The Harbin Z-9 and its variants are license-built by Harbin Aircraft Manufacturing Corporation for the Chinese People's Liberation Army.

== Operators ==
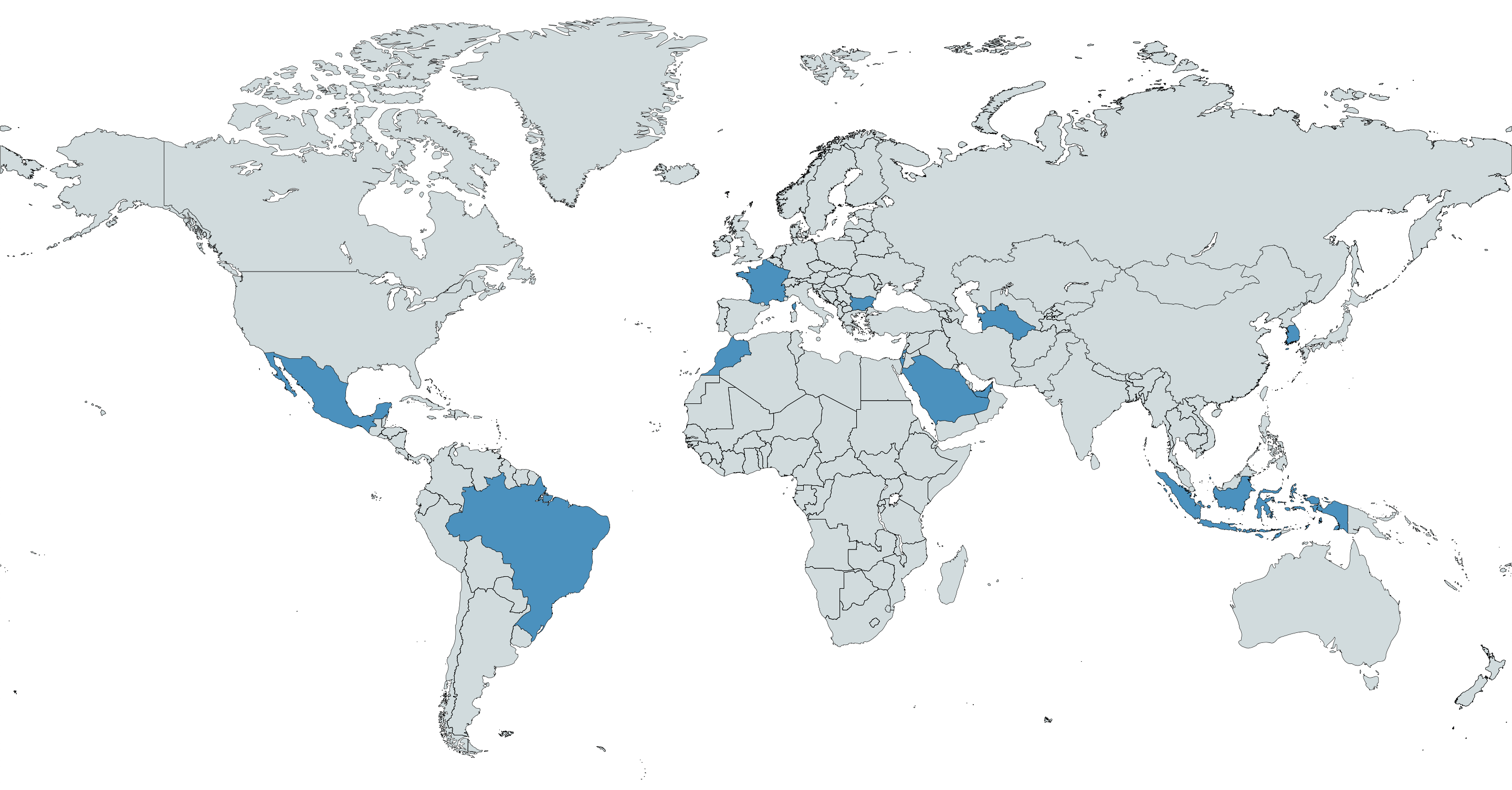
Map with AS565 Panther operators in blue

Brazil

- Brazilian Army

Bulgaria

- Bulgarian Navy

France

- French Naval Aviation

Indonesia

- Indonesian Navy

Israel

- Israeli Air Force (used by the Israeli Navy). To be replaced by the SH-60 Seahawk.

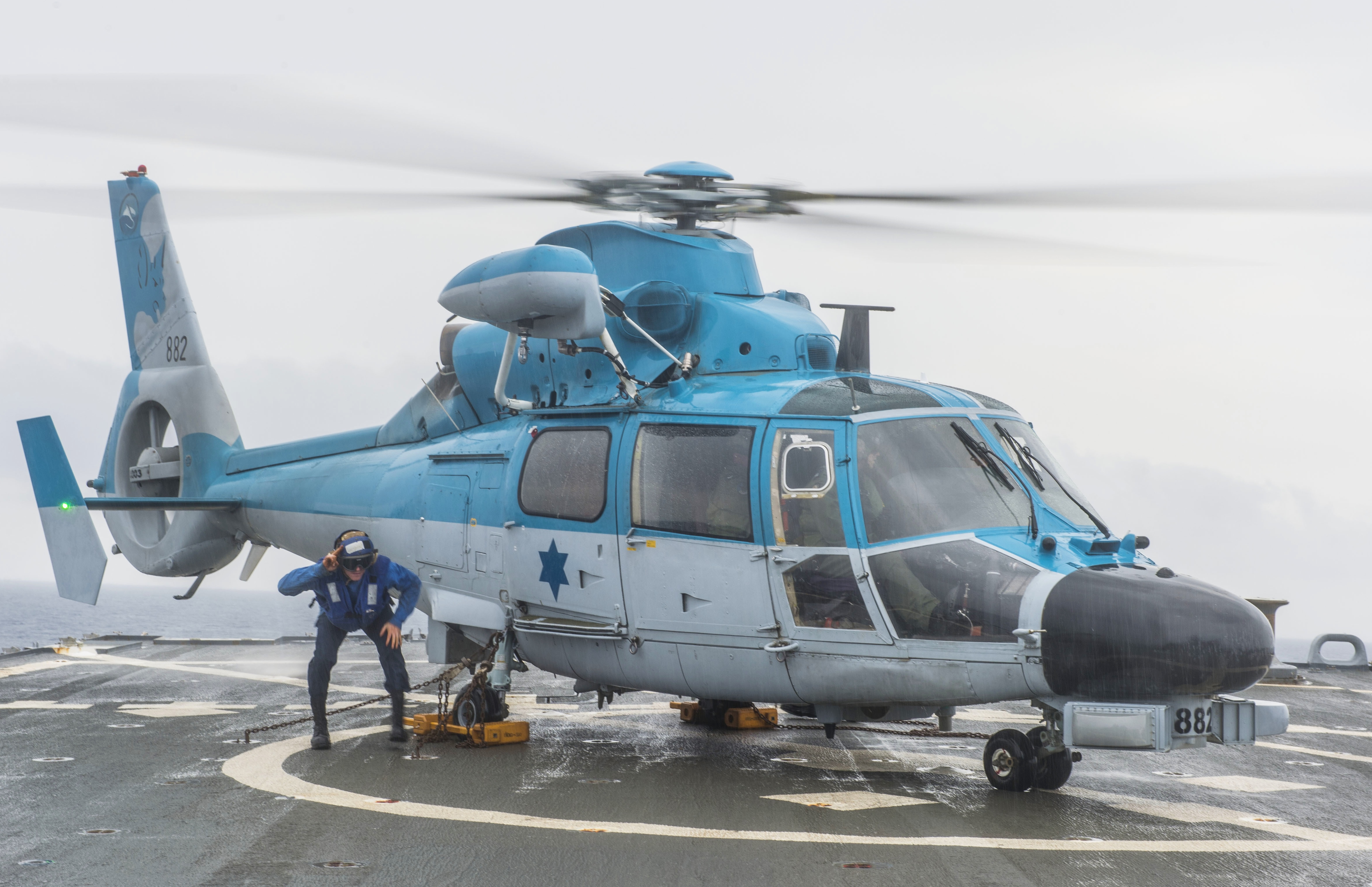
Israeli Air Force AS565 is secured down to the deck of USS Laboon

Mexico

- Mexican Navy

Morocco

- Royal Moroccan Navy

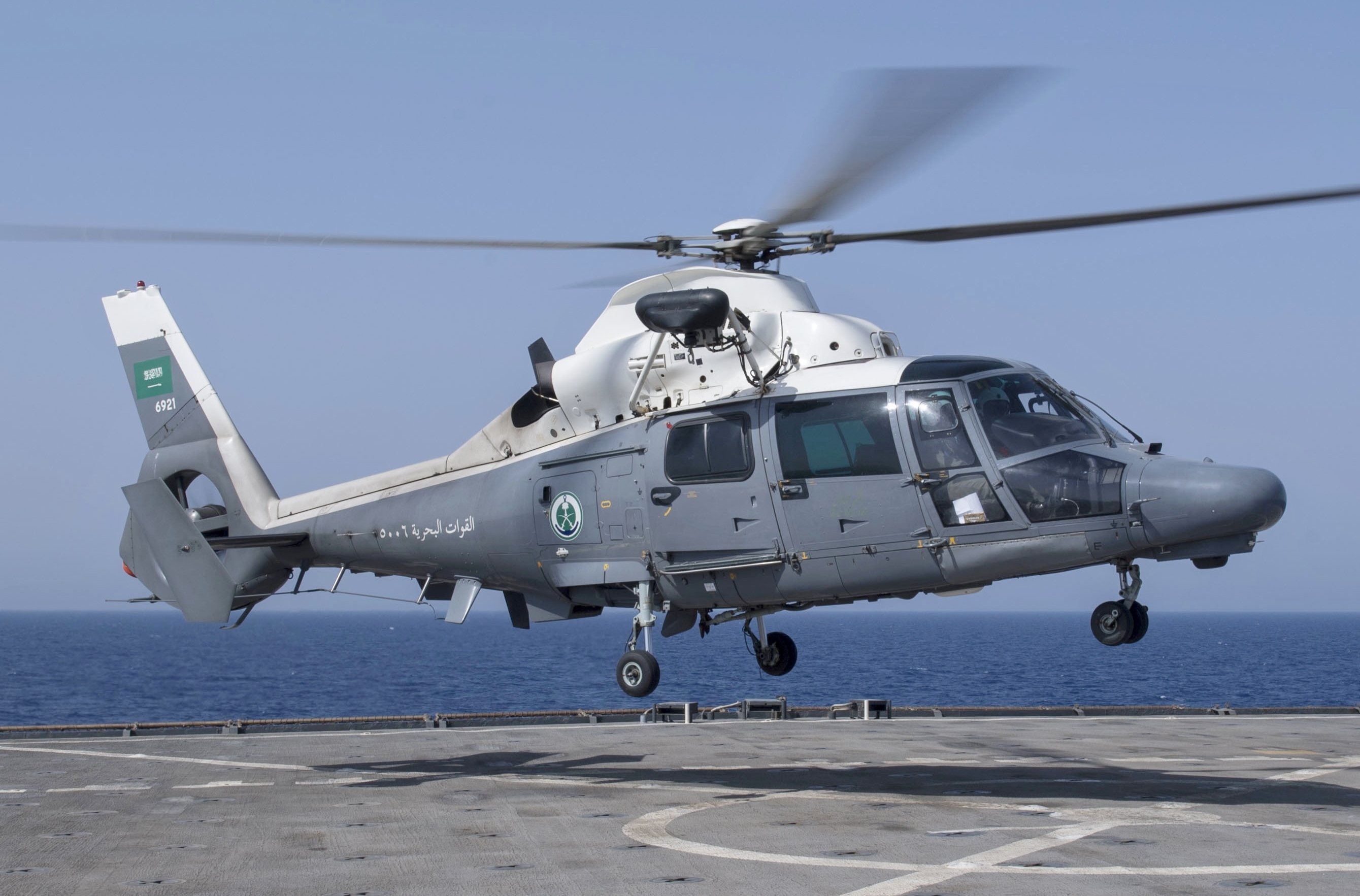
An AS565 of the Royal Saudi Naval Forces

South Korea

- Korea Coast Guard

Saudi Arabia

- Royal Saudi Naval Forces

Turkmenistan

- Turkmen Air Force

United Arab Emirates

- United Arab Emirates Air Force

== Specifications (AS365 MB Panther) ==

External videos
- French Navy Panther taxiing and taking off
- Footage of Panther operations
- AS565 Panther overview

Data from

General characteristics

- Crew: 1 or 2 pilots
- Capacity: 10 troops
- Length: 13.68 m (44 ft 11 in)
- Height: 3.97 m (13 ft 0 in)
- Empty weight: 2,380 kg (5,247 lb)
- Max takeoff weight: 4,300 kg (9,480 lb)
- Powerplant: 2 × Turboméca Arriel 2C turboshaft, 635 kW (852 hp) each
- Main rotor diameter: 11.94 m (39 ft 2 in)
- Main rotor area: 111.98 m^{2} (1,205.3 sq ft)

Performance

- Maximum speed: 306 km/h (190 mph, 165 kn)
- Range: 827 km (514 mi, 447 nmi)
- Endurance: 4.1 hours
- Service ceiling: 5,865 m (19,242 ft)
- Rate of climb: 8.9 m/s (1,750 ft/min)

Armament

- Guns: M621 cannon 20 mm (0.787 in) cannon pods.
- Rockets: 68 mm (2.677 in) or 70 mm (2.756 in) unguided rockets.
- Missiles:
  - Matra Mistral air-to-air missiles.
  - AS 15 TT anti-ship missiles.
  - HOT anti-tank missiles.
  - Mk46 or Whitehead A.244/S anti-submarine warfare torpedoes.

== See also ==
Related development

- Eurocopter AS365 Dauphin
- Eurocopter EC155
- Eurocopter MH-65 Dolphin

Aircraft of comparable role, configuration, and era

- AgustaWestland AW159 Wildcat
- Bell 412
- Bell UH-1Y Venom
- HAL Dhruv
- HAL LUH
- Harbin Z-9
- Kaman SH-2G Super Seasprite
- Kamov Ka-27
- Sikorsky SH-60 Seahawk
- Westland Lynx

Related lists

- List of rotorcraft
