= AS.15TT =

AS.15 TT
- Side view of an AS 15 TT missile
- Type: Anti-shipping missile
- Place of origin: France

Service history
- In service: 1985 -
- Used by: Saudi Arabia (main user)
- Wars: Gulf War

Production history
- Designed: mid 1970s
- Manufacturer: Aérospatiale
- Unit cost: $295 000 (1992)
- Produced: 1985-
- No. built: 306

Specifications
- Mass: 96 kilograms (212 lb)
- Length: 2.16 metres (7 ft 1 in)
- Width: 0.564 metres (1 ft 10.2 in)
- Diameter: 0.185 metres (7.3 in)
- Warhead: HE, semi-perforating
- Warhead weight: 30 kilograms (66 lb)
- Detonation mechanism: impact fuze
- Engine: Two SNPE Anubis CMDB booster (launch); One SNPE Acis CDB sustainer motor (cruise)
- Operational range: 15,000 metres (49,000 ft)
- Flight altitude: Sea-skimming
- Maximum speed: 1,008 kilometres per hour (626 mph)
- Guidance system: Radio command guidance (remote control guidance)

The AS.15 and AS.15TT (in French: "Tous Temps", meaning "All weather") are French anti-ship missiles. It was developed as a replacement for the AS-12 missile.

== Development ==
In the 1970s two Aerospatiale programs were started to examine potential replacements for the AS.12 missile. These were the radar guided AS 15 TT and the AM 10 LASSO (Light anti-surface semi-automatic optical), which were both publicly revealed in 1976 and 1977 respectively. Development of the AM 10 was halted in 1978 when it became apparent that the optically tracked missile had less potential than the radar-guided one.

The first live firing was conducted in 1981. Helicopter integration began in 1982 and was completed in the second half of 1983. Development was completed in June 1985.

A ship launched version of the missile, designated MM 15 was shown at the 1984 Farnborough Air Show, and later the 1992 Singapore air show, firing trials were reportedly conducted in 1993. A coastal defense version of the missile has also been offered by Aerospatiale.

== Description ==
The missile consists of a long cylindrical main body ending in a pointed nose, with four fins arranged in a cruciform cross-section. Each fin has a pod on the tip containing either a radar receiver or a battery. From front to back the missile consists of the warhead and impact fuse and safety and arming mechanism. Next is the autopilot (EOP), altimeter, gyro, and radar receiver and a battery. Following that is the SNPE Acis CDB solid rocket sustainer motor, which exhausts through a small central nozzle. Behind the sustainer are the two solid rocket SNPE Anubis CMDB booster motors, which exhaust through two large nozzles. On the rear underside of the missile is a radar altimeter. On the rear of the missile are four inline control fins.

The guidance system of the missile is actually command guidance, as the missile doesn't have its own radar. It only follows orders provided by the onboard radar of the carrier/launcher helicopter, the Thomson-CSF I/J-band "Agrion 15". When this radar detects and identifies a suitable target, it switches to automatic tracking mode. Once the target is inside the missiles range it launches, the booster motors accelerate the missile to its cruise speed of 280 meters per second, after which the sustainer motor cuts in. The missile immediately begins descending to an altitude of around 3 to 5 meters. The rocket motors have a combined burn time of around 45 seconds.

Bearing corrections are transmitted to the missile via the Agrion 15 radar and are picked up by the rearward-facing receiver units in two of the wing pods. The directional nature of the receivers makes jamming the command link difficult. On final approach to the target (about 1000 ft remaining to target), the missile descends to an altitude of around two meters. Its powerful warhead is able to perforate a 40 millimetres (1.6 in) thick steel armoured hull.

The Agrion 15 radar is capable of detecting a large ship at a range of 150 kilometres (93 mi) and a smaller attack boat at a range of 100 kilometres (62 mi).

== Service ==
The missile entered service with Saudi Arabia in 1985, and 365 of the missiles were ordered.

The AS-15TT missile was relatively similar to the British Sea Skua missile; both were meant to replace the AS-12, both were very small anti-ship missiles, and up to four examples were used with small helicopters (Lynx and Dauphin). The AS-15TT, with a characteristic red colour (Sea Skua was often white), was, in comparison to the British rival, smaller, slimmer, lighter and with a different type of guidance. However, unlike Sea Skua, its only guidance was by the Agrion 15 radar, without the flexibility of the other system, and was, therefore, less successful in the market. Both the missiles were also offered unsuccessfully as surface-surface models (the Kuwaiti Navy being the only operator of either missile in the surface-to-surface role, using Sea Skuas aboard its fast attack craft).

Sea Skua also had the advantage of being 'combat proven' (Falklands) and in service with the Royal Navy, while the French Navy did not have it in service, so it was produced apparently only for Saudi Arabia.

== At war ==
During the Gulf War, the Royal Saudi Navy reported firing 15 missiles against 5 Iraqi patrol boats.

== Operators ==
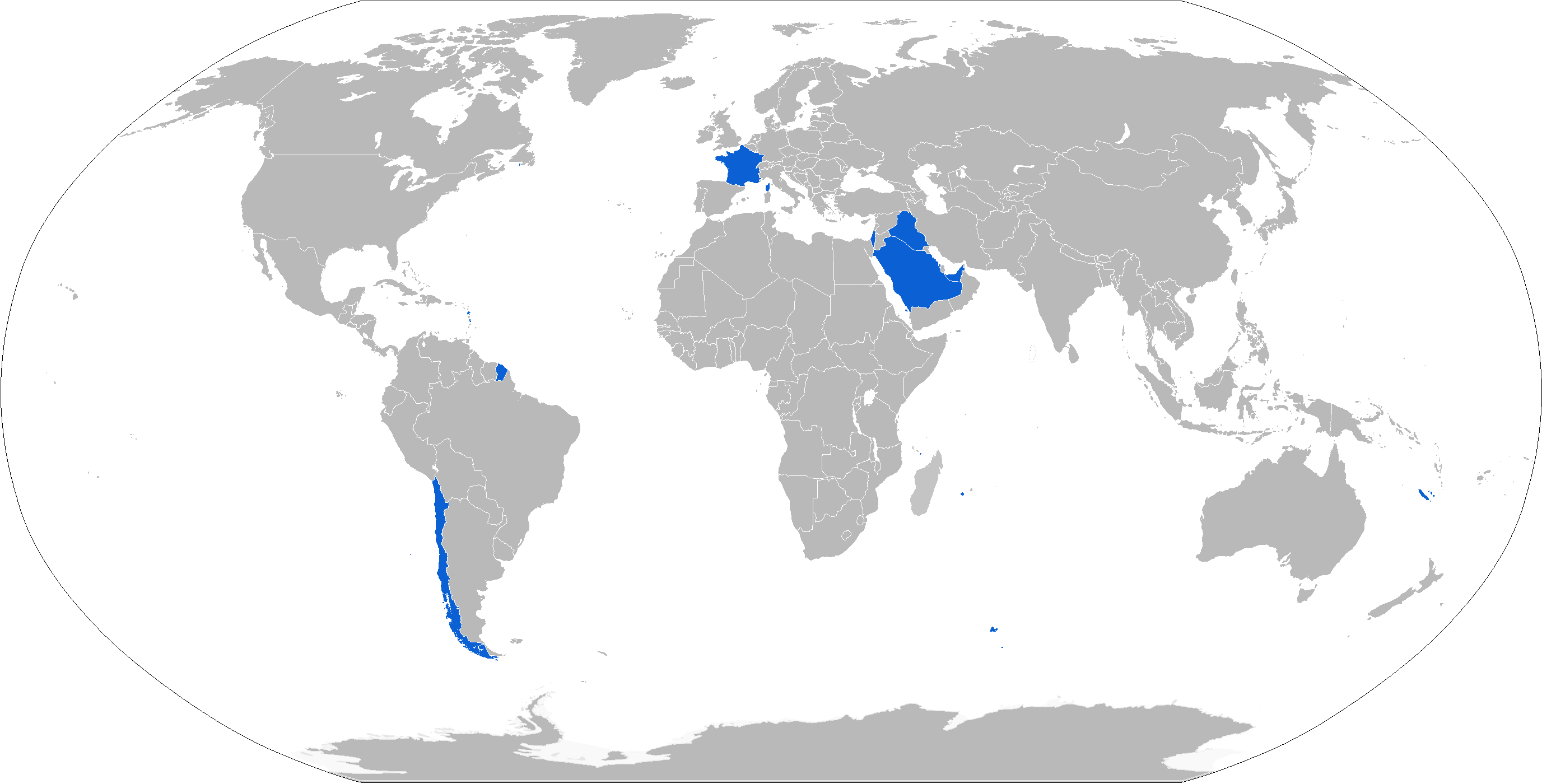
Map with AS 15 TT operators in blue

=== Current operators ===
Bahrain
20 missiles, for Dauphin helicopters aboard fast attack crafts.
Chile
For Dauphin helicopters.
France
The missile never entered service in its country of origin. Only about 32 missiles were bought for the French Navy, for trials.
Iraq
60 missiles ordered in 1989, probably never delivered.
Israel
For Dauphin helicopters.
Saudi Arabia
First order for 221 missiles in 1988, with a total delivery of 254. Used on AS565 Panther helicopters, aboard Al-Madinah-class frigates and shore bases.
United Arab Emirates
New order in 1994, to equip seven AS565 Panther helicopters.
