= Seaspray (radar) =

British airborne radar series

Seaspray is series of a British airborne maritime radar systems, initially developed by Ferranti for the Lynx helicopter, built in Edinburgh. It is used primarily as an air-to-surface-vessel (ASV) radar in the anti-submarine and anti-missile-boat roles. The combination of Lynx and Seaspray has been an export success and operates in numerous armed forces around the world, often along with the related Sea Skua short-range missile.

A new series, Seaspray 7000, was launched in 2002. This is an all-new design sharing only the name with the original design.

== History ==
=== Original Seaspray ===
In 1967, Egyptian missile boat sank the Israeli destroyer Eilat, immediately revealing the serious threat these new weapons presented. When the Royal Navy considered the problem, it appeared that there was no simple ship-mounted solution. Although the Seacat missile had been designed with a secondary anti-shipping role, it lacked the range needed to attack the boats while still too far to launch their missiles. Sea Dart could also be used in this role and had a much longer range, but was too large to fit on the frigates and smaller ships which made up much of the fleet.

The solution was to move the weapons off the ships and mount them on helicopters instead. This would mean the missile needed only enough range to keep the helicopter out of range of the guns on the boats, which were typically short-range systems with perhaps 2 to 3 kilometres (1.2 to 1.9 mi) effective range. A longer range would be useful as it would hide the helicopter's approach. The result was the Sea Skua missile, with a maximum range of about 25 kilometres (16 mi).

Because the missile boats are small, they can hide under the radar horizon of the ships while closing the range. Detecting these targets before they moved into the range of their anti-ship missiles would require the helicopters to carry an air-to-surface-vessel radar and patrol the area around their ships out to the approximate 40 kilometres (25 mi) range of its primary target, the P-15 Termit missile, or Styx as it was known in the west.

The contract for the radar system was given to Ferranti in July 1969. Development was overseen by Sir Donald McCallum. Adrian Hope, 4th Marquess of Linlithgow worked on the system. The design traces many of its design features to the pioneering AIRPASS radar developed for the English Electric Lightning, the first production all-digital radar. The first models were produced as ARI.5979 Mk. 1 version in 1971. Trials of the Seaspray radar system began in 1974.

Seaspray is a monopulse radar that produces 90 kW in the I band (formerly known as the X-band). The semi-parabolic reflector was made of lightweight foam with a wire mesh to make the system as light as possible. The system scanned 180° in azimuth by rotating the reflector and feed horn together and scanned vertically by moving the reflector with the feed horn.

=== Doppler Seaspray ===
In the late 1980s, improved versions were developed, adding doppler radar techniques. These were introduced in the early 1990s as the Seaspray 2000 and 3000 and found use on a variety of aircraft, including the Lynx, Lockheed C-130 Hercules, Westland Sea King, Bell 212 and Fokker F27.

=== AESA Seaspray ===
A completely redesigned Seaspray 7000E version was launched in July 2002 by BAE System Avionics. This replaced the mechanically scanned feed horn with an active electronically scanned array that provided the elevation scanning and fine pointing of the azimuth using beam steering.

Two larger versions were also built using the same electronics. Seaspray 5000E equips the Sikorsky S-92, Embraer EMB-111 patrol conversions, and Canadair CL-604 Challenger. The even larger Seaspray 7500E is used on US Coast Guard C-130s.

The division of Ferranti that developed Seaspray became GEC-Marconi, then BAE Systems, then Selex ES, and is today part of Leonardo. Seaspray 7500E V2 is an enhancement of the operationally proven 7500E

== Operations ==
The Royal Danish Navy bought the system in the late 1970s. 709 Naval Air Squadron were the first to have Seaspray-equipped Lynx helicopters in 1978. 24 Royal Navy Lynx HAS.2s were sent to the Falklands War, and 16 of these were equipped with Seaspray. In 1992, the Seaspray 2000 was sold to the Scottish Fisheries Protection Agency for £0.5m. In January 1999, the German Navy (Deutsche Marine) bought the system for £15m for its Lynx helicopters. In August 2005, the United States Coast Guard bought the Seaspray 7500E radar system for £69m for its 22 HC-130 Hercules aircraft.

== See also ==
- Searchwater
