= Sea Skua =

British lightweight short-range anti-ship missile

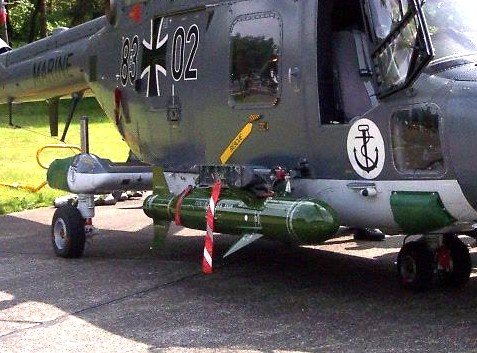
- Sea Skua missile on a Westland Lynx of the German Navy
- Type: Air-to-surface missile, anti-ship missile
- Place of origin: United Kingdom

Service history
- In service: 1982
- Used by: See operators
- Wars: Falklands War; Gulf War

Production history
- Designer: British Aircraft Corporation
- Designed: 1972
- Manufacturer: British Aircraft Corporation (1972–1977); BAe Dynamics (1977–1999); MBDA (UK) Ltd (since 1999)
- Produced: 1975

Specifications
- Mass: 145 kg
- Length: 2.5 m
- Diameter: 0.25 m
- Wingspan: 0.72 m
- Warhead: 30 kg semi armour piercing, 9 kg RDX
- Detonation mechanism: Impact fuze, delayed detonation
- Engine: Solid fuel booster / solid fuel sustainer
- Operational range: 25 km
- Maximum speed: Mach 1+
- Guidance system: Semi-active radar homing
- Steering system: Control surfaces
- Launch platform: Westland Lynx, Combattante BR-42 FAC

The Sea Skua is a British lightweight short-range air-to-surface missile (ASM) designed for use from helicopters against ships. It was primarily used by the Royal Navy on the Westland Lynx. Although the missile is intended for helicopter use, Kuwait employs it in a shore battery and on their Umm Al Maradem (Combattante BR-42) fast attack craft.

The Royal Navy withdrew the missile from active service in 2017. Its replacement, Sea Venom was considerably delayed with full operating capability not expected until 2026.

== Development ==
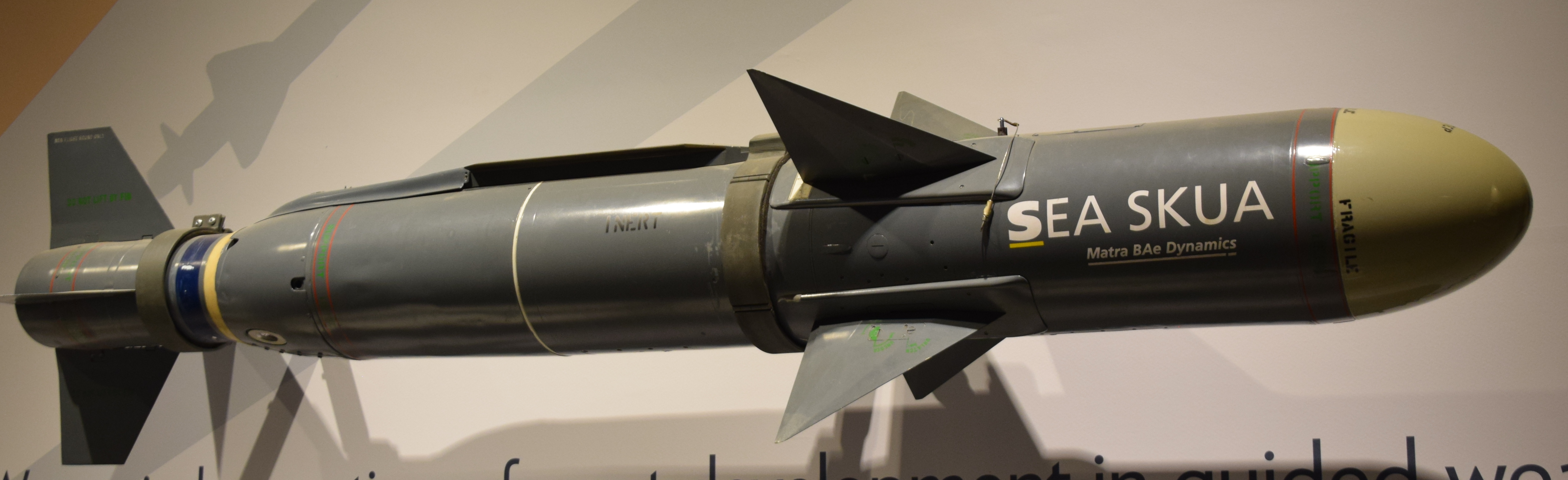
Sea Skua missile on display

=== Dual-use missile development ===
Sea Skua traces its history, indirectly, to the immediate post-war era. Growing increasingly concerned about the threat of aircraft, especially after the introduction of glide bombs during the war, the Royal Navy was convinced that all ships required some form of surface-to-air missile (SAM) for defence. These systems tended to be relatively large, especially in the era before vertical launch, and it was difficult to mount both a useful SAM and a conventional gun on smaller ships.

This led to a series of experiments to produce a dual-use missile capable of both anti-air and anti-ship use, thereby removing the need for a gun. The original Navy guided-missile sets, Seaslug and Seacat, both had secondary anti-shipping roles. Seaslug was a large system and could only be carried by larger ships, while Seacat could be fitted to almost any ship but had a relatively short-range and small warhead suitable only for use against small boats. Neither filled the goal of replacing guns in any meaningful way.

In October 1960, the Navy launched a project with the goal of once again producing a single weapon that could fit on a 3,000-ton frigate and able to attack bombers, anti-shipping missiles, and other ships up to frigate size. This led to the Small-Ship Guided Weapon and ultimately to Sea Dart, which was tested in the anti-shipping role against a Brave-class patrol boat. It also ended up being too large for the smallest ships and was ultimately only fit for destroyers and larger ships. So, by the late 1960s, the role of a widely available dual-purpose weapon remained unfilled.

=== Short-range weapon ===
The sinking of Eliat in 1967 led to the realization that small fast-attack boats carrying medium-range anti-shipping missiles were a serious immediate threat. A weapon was needed that could destroy any such craft before it could approach within the launching range of its missiles, which was longer-ranged than any light gun. Seacat did not have anywhere near the required range. Sea Dart did, but could not be fitted to the majority of RN ships. A new dedicated anti-shipping missile could fill the role, but it would have to be roughly the same size as those being aimed against it in order to reach the required range, which would make it take up too much room on a ship carrying many other weapons systems. This turn of events was the final nail in the idea of having a dual-purpose weapon.

The entire concept was reevaluated and led to the decision to launch a new weapon from helicopters. Long-range was not required, it only had to travel far enough to keep the helicopter out of range of any anti-aircraft weapons the boats might carry. Because the boats were small, these would be light weapons with limited range. The missile would be carried by the new Westland Lynx and its targets detected by a new lightweight radar, Seaspray. Its combat effectiveness was further improved by the addition of the Racal "Orange Crop" ECM suite, which allowed the helicopter to track the boats who were using radar to attempt to approach their target ships, allowing the helicopters to approach without turning on their Seaspray until the last moment.

The British Aircraft Corporation (BAC) began development in May 1972. The British Government authorised its production in October 1975. At the time, the missile was known as CL.834. The first launches took place in November 1979 at the Aberporth Range in Cardigan Bay. Three missiles were launched from the ground and three by helicopters. Further tests were made and in July 1981, full-scale production was ordered of the new missile, now called "Sea Skua".

== Design ==
Sea Skua missile

With the missile weighing only 320 pounds (150 kg) at launch, a Lynx helicopter can carry up to four, two on each wing pylon. The booster is a Royal Ordnance (now Roxel UK) "Redstart" steel body, while the sustainer is a Royal Ordnance "Matapan" light alloy body. The missile flies at high subsonic speed to a range of up to 15.5 miles (24.9 km). The official range is declared to be 15 km, but this is widely exceeded. The missile has two sensors: a semi-active radar homing system by Marconi Defence Systems, and a Thomson-TRT AHV-7 radar altimeter (which is also used by the Exocet missile), built under licence by British Aerospace Defence Systems.

The missile is launched into a cruise at a preselected altitude, with four settings for different surface conditions. The launching helicopter illuminates the target with its radar, normally the Seaspray. As it approaches the pre-programmed location of the target, the missile climbs to a higher altitude in order to acquire the radar signal for final homing. This allows it to fly below the horizon for much of the journey, reducing the chance it will be noticed and allow the target to attempt to escape. On impact it penetrates the hull of a ship before detonating the 62 pounds (28 kg) blast fragmentation warhead. A semi armour piercing (SAP) warhead is also available; this contains 9 kilograms (20 lb) of RDX, aluminium and wax. The fuze is an impact-delayed model.

The illuminating radar aboard Lynx helicopters is the Seaspray, developed by Ferranti, now GEC, specifically for this role. This weighs only 64 kilograms (141 lb). It operates in the I band with a power of 90 kW, with two modes (three in the improved model) and a 90° observation field. The Seaspray Mk. 3 had a rotating antenna with a 360° field of view. It is capable of operating in a track while scan (TWS) mode. The missile flight ends after 75–125 seconds, during which time the helicopter can manoeuvre at up to 80° from the missile path.

== Service ==
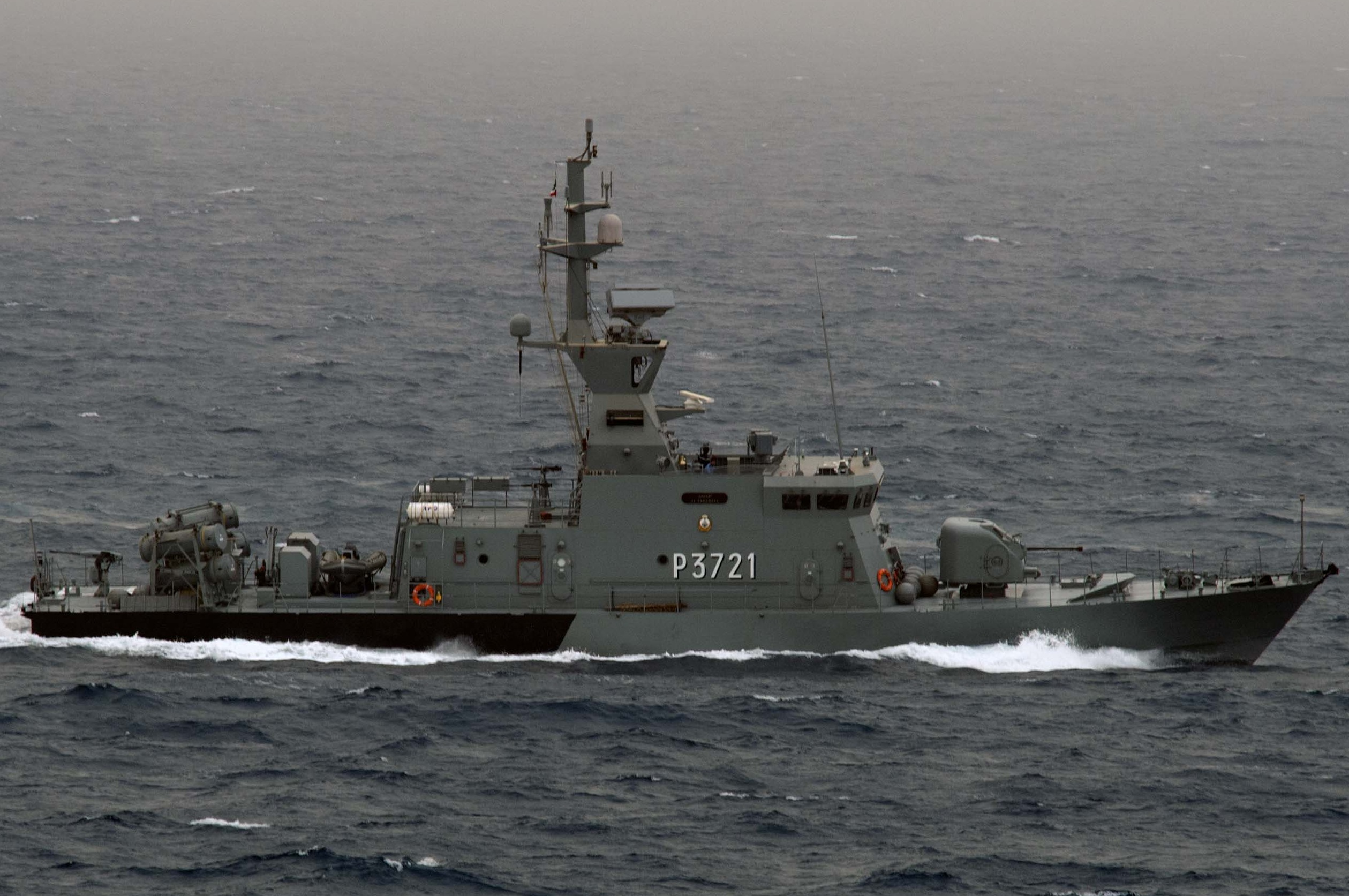
Four Sea Skua canisters can be seen on the stern of the Kuwaiti fast attack craft Al Fahaheel in May 2013

In addition to serving with the United Kingdom, the Sea Skua has been exported to Germany (where it will be replaced from 2012 onwards), India, Kuwait and Turkey. It was generally preferred to the similar rival, the French-built AS 15 TT, even though the two missiles had similar performance. The guidance of AS-15TT was radio-command, and it required the Agrion 15 radar, unlike the more flexible British missile. Sea Skua's success in active service and its adoption by the Royal Navy resulted in considerable success in the international market.

=== Falklands War ===
Sea Skuas were launched eight times during the Falklands War, occasionally in extremely poor weather, and achieved a high hit rate.

On 3 May at 01:30, a Sea King helicopter from HMS Invincible (R05) detected a target on radar and closed to identify it. The helicopter came under fire and withdrew to a safe distance to shadow the vessel. Lynx helicopters from HMS Coventry (D118) and HMS Glasgow (D88) were dispatched to engage the target.

Coventry's Lynx located the target and was fired on by a medium-calibre gun, responding with two Sea Skuas. One missile missed, while the other struck a small boat and wounding a crewman manning a 20 mm gun. Glasgow Lynx (XZ247) was delayed by radio problems but arrived twenty minutes later, launching two additional Sea Skuas, at least one of which hit the bridge.

The target was later identified as the 800-ton patrol boat and rescue tug Alferez Sobral, formerly USS Salish, which retreated with eight crew killed, including the ship's captain, Lieutenant Commander Sergio Gómez Roca, eight wounded, and severe structural damage. Alferez Sobral returned to Puerto Deseado and remained in service with the Argentine Navy until 2018. Its damaged bridge is now displayed at the Naval Museum in Tigre.

A further four Sea Skuas were used to destroy the wrecks of the cargo ship Río Carcarañá (8,500 grt) and PNA Río Iguazú, a patrol boat of the Argentine Naval Prefecture.

=== First Gulf War ===
During the Gulf War, six naval Lynx helicopters were deployed to the Gulf on four frigates and destroyers of the Royal Navy. On 24 January 1991 one Lynx engaged and sank two Iraqi minesweepers near Qurah Island. A third was scuttled.

A larger engagement took place on 29 January 1991. A force of seventeen Iraqi landing craft and escorting fast attack craft and minesweepers were detected moving south near Failaka island, as part of the Iraqi attack which resulted in the Battle of Khafji. Two vessels were sunk by Sea Skuas fired by four Lynx helicopters. The remaining vessels were damaged, destroyed or dispersed by American carrier-based aircraft and Royal Navy Sea King helicopters.

The next day, another convoy of three Polnocny-class landing ship, three TNC-45 fast attack craft (taken over by Iraq from the Kuwaiti Navy) and a single T43-class minesweeper, was detected in the same area. Sea Skuas fired from four Lynx helicopters destroyed the three fast attack craft, and damaged the minesweeper and one landing ship; the landing ship was later destroyed by RAF Jaguars.

During several engagements in February, Lynxes with Sea Skuas destroyed a Zhuk-class patrol boat, a salvage vessel and another Polnocny-class landing ship and damaged another Zhuk patrol boat.

=== Royal Malaysian Navy service ===
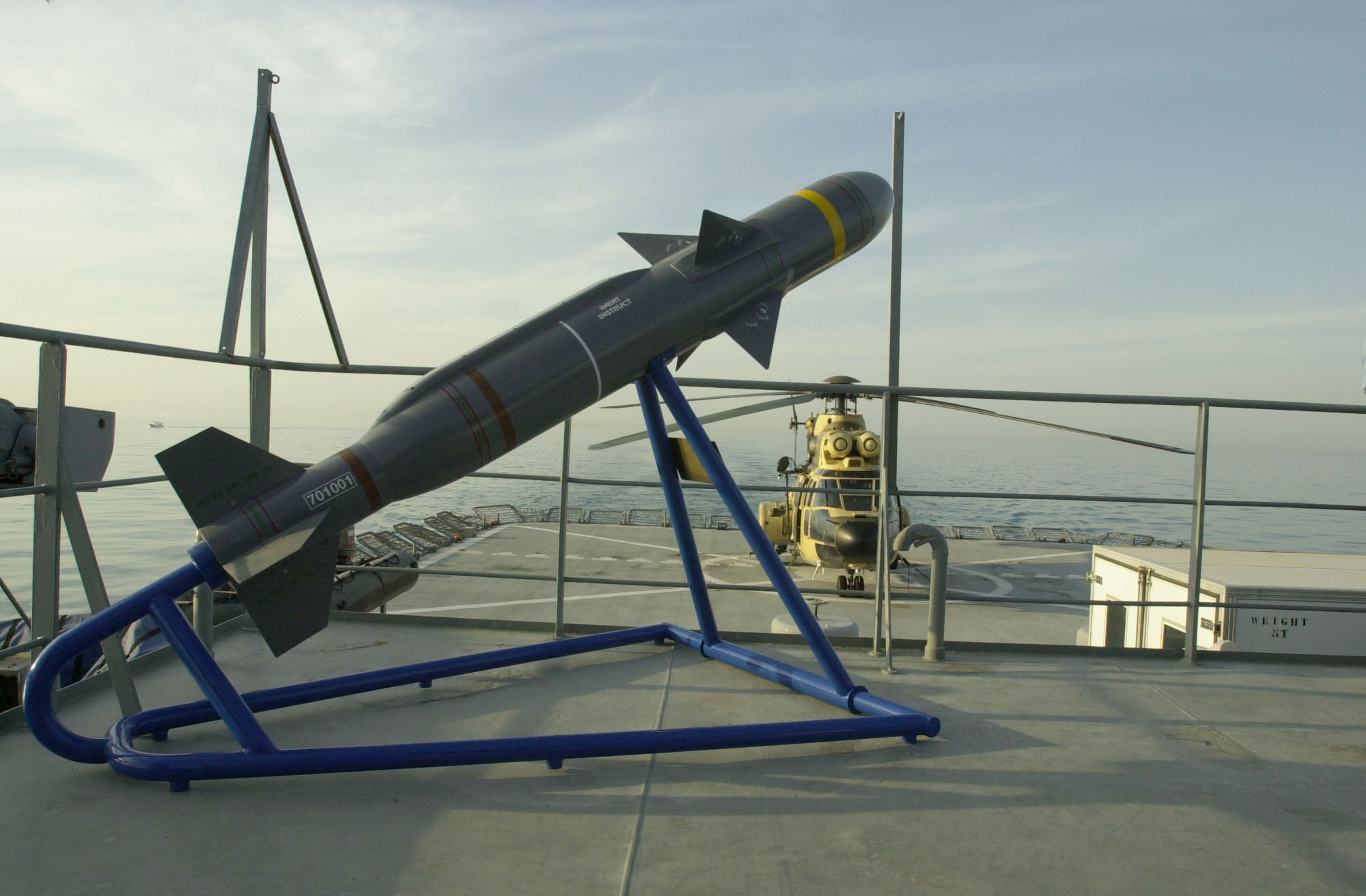
An inert Sea Skua on the deck of a Kuwaiti ship

The Sea Skua entered service with the Royal Malaysian Navy as part of the package for the purchase of six AgustaWestland Sea Lynx 300 helicopters. The missiles supposedly cost RM104 million.

On 16 March 2006, the Royal Malaysian Navy test-fired the Sea Skua missile as part of a contractual Firing exercise. The missile was fired eight miles downrange from the 40m Surface Target Barge. The Sea Skua failed to hit its target and failed to explode. The fault was believed to have been traced to a faulty connecting pin wire that ignites the rocket motor. The missile fell into the sea and was not recovered. The Royal Malaysian Navy ordered Matra Bae Dynamics (MBDA) to take back the missiles to conduct system checks and re-tested.

On 12 February 2008, the Royal Malaysian Navy successfully conducted a second firing. The missile was fired from maximum range and hit a surface target.

== Future ==
Sea Skua is planned to be replaced in UK service by the Sea Venom. The Royal Navy conducted its final Sea Skua live firing in March 2017.

== Operators ==
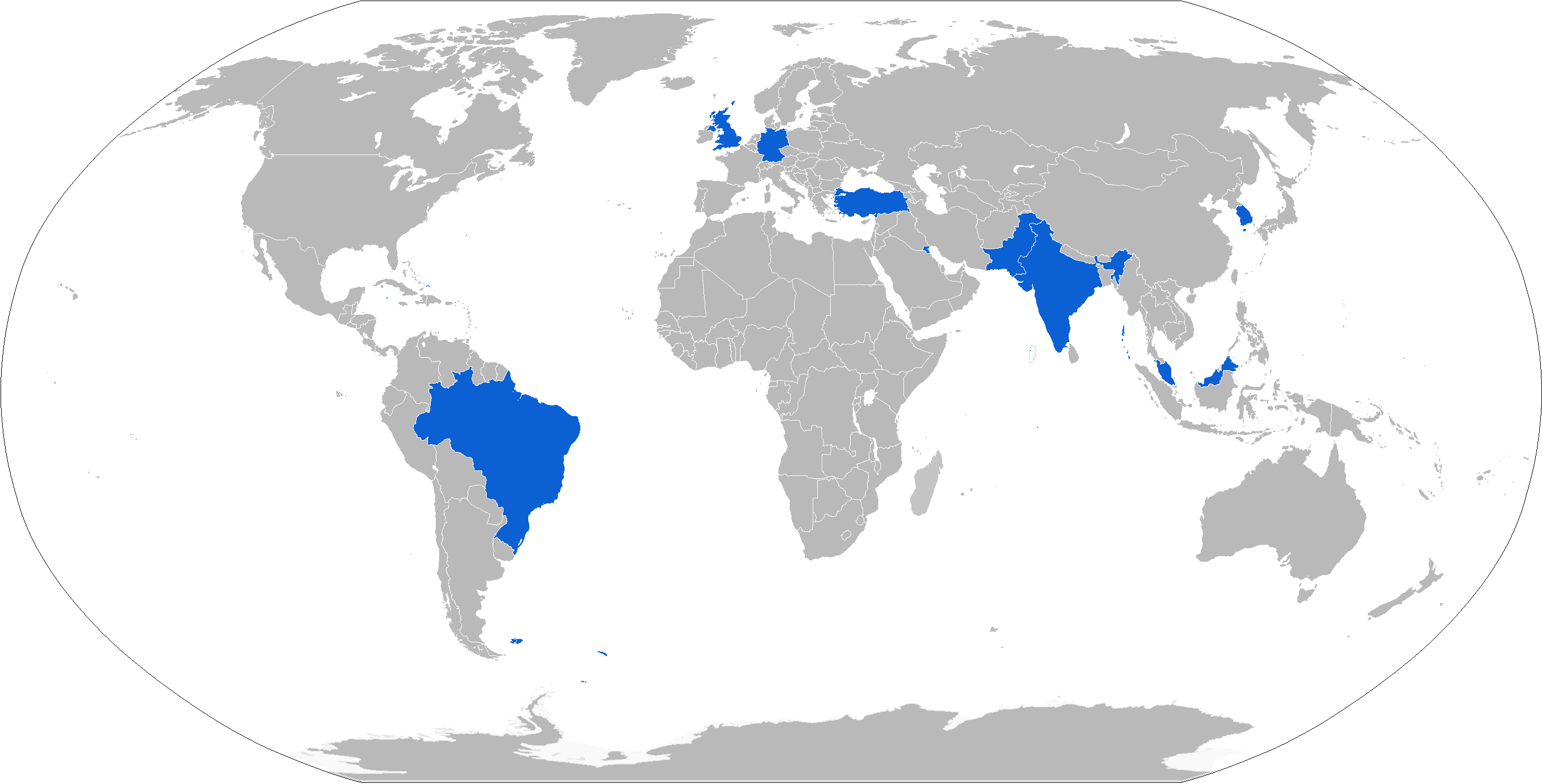
Map with Sea Skua operators in blue

=== Current operators ===
Brazil
Germany
India
Kuwait
Malaysia
Royal Malaysian Navy
Pakistan
South Korea
Republic of Korea Navy
Turkey

== See also ==
- Skua - the bird the missile is named after
- Penguin (missile) – (Norway)
- AS.15TT – (France)
- Exocet – (France)
- Sea Killer / Marte – (Italy)

== Sources ==
Fischer, Johann. "Sea Skua, the hurricane from the Sea". RiD Magazine, Genova, March 1993.
