= KAI LAH-1 Miron =

South Korean armed helicopter

LAH-1 Miron
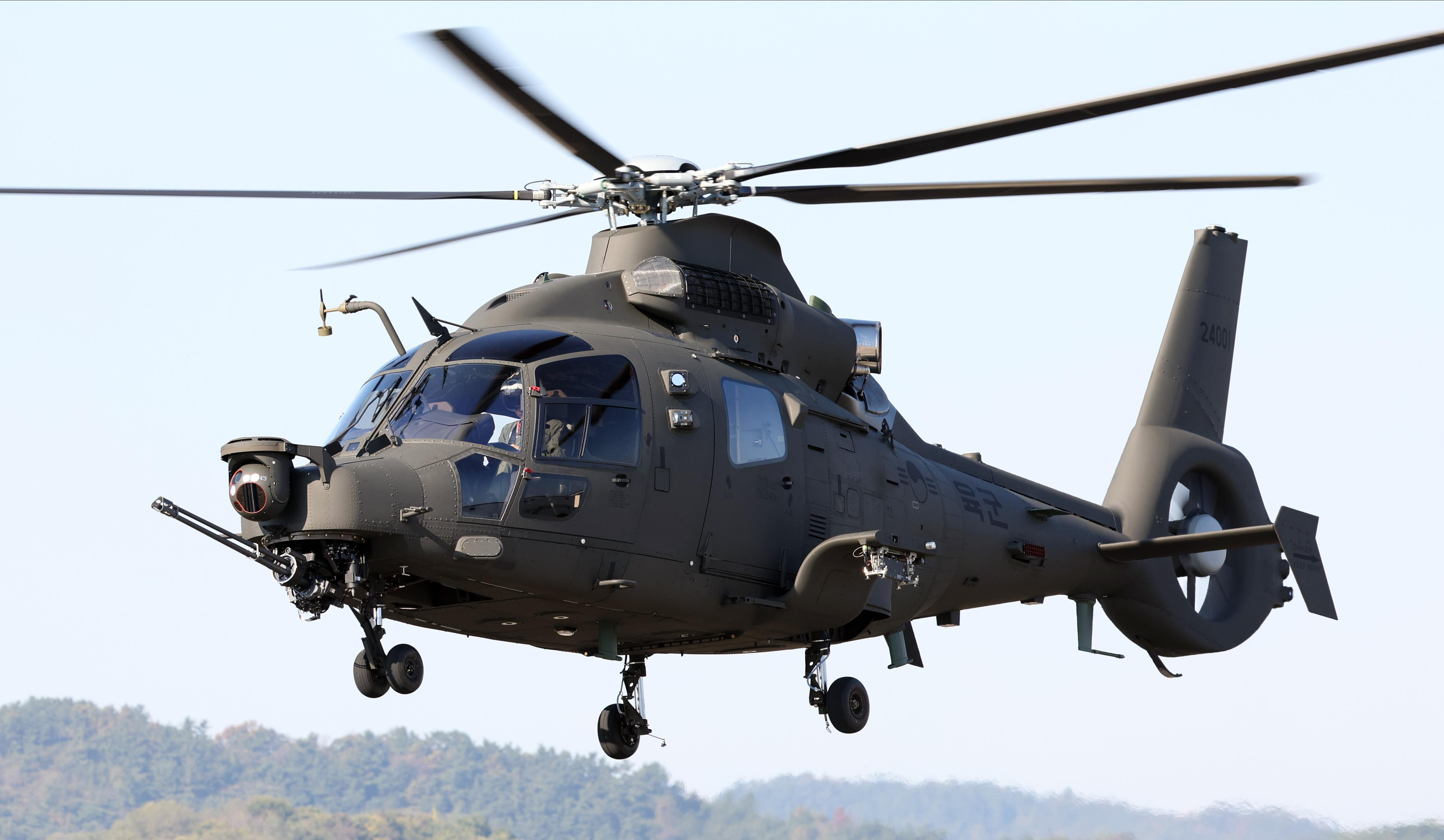
- LAH-1 Miron mass-produced model

General information
- Type: Armed helicopter
- National origin: South Korea
- Manufacturer: Korea Aerospace Industries; Airbus Helicopters
- Designer: Agency for Defense Development
- Status: In service
- Primary user: Republic of Korea Army
- Number built: 4

History
- First flight: 4 July 2019
- Developed from: Airbus Helicopters H155

The KAI LAH-1 Miron (Korean: LAH-1 미르온), or simply LAH (Light Armed Helicopter; Korean: 소형무장헬기; Hanja: 小型武裝直升機), is a compact twin-engine armed helicopter developed by Korea Aerospace Industries (KAI). The LAH-1 Miron has been developed from the Eurocopter EC155 following an agreement between the multinational manufacturer Airbus Helicopters and KAI made in 2015. It is capable of performing multiple mission roles including light attack, close air support, escort, and troop transport duties, replacing both the MD500 Defender and AH-1S Cobra helicopters of the Republic of Korea Army (ROKA).

On 4 July 2019, the LAH conducted its maiden flight, KAI reportedly aims to complete its development during 2022. The company has prompted several conceptual variants of the LAH, including an unmanned aerial vehicle (UAV) and a troop-transport Light Utility Helicopter (LUH) model.

LAH was officially given the name LAH-1 Miron after the initial production unit was delivered to the Republic of Korea Army in December 2024.

== Development ==
=== Background ===
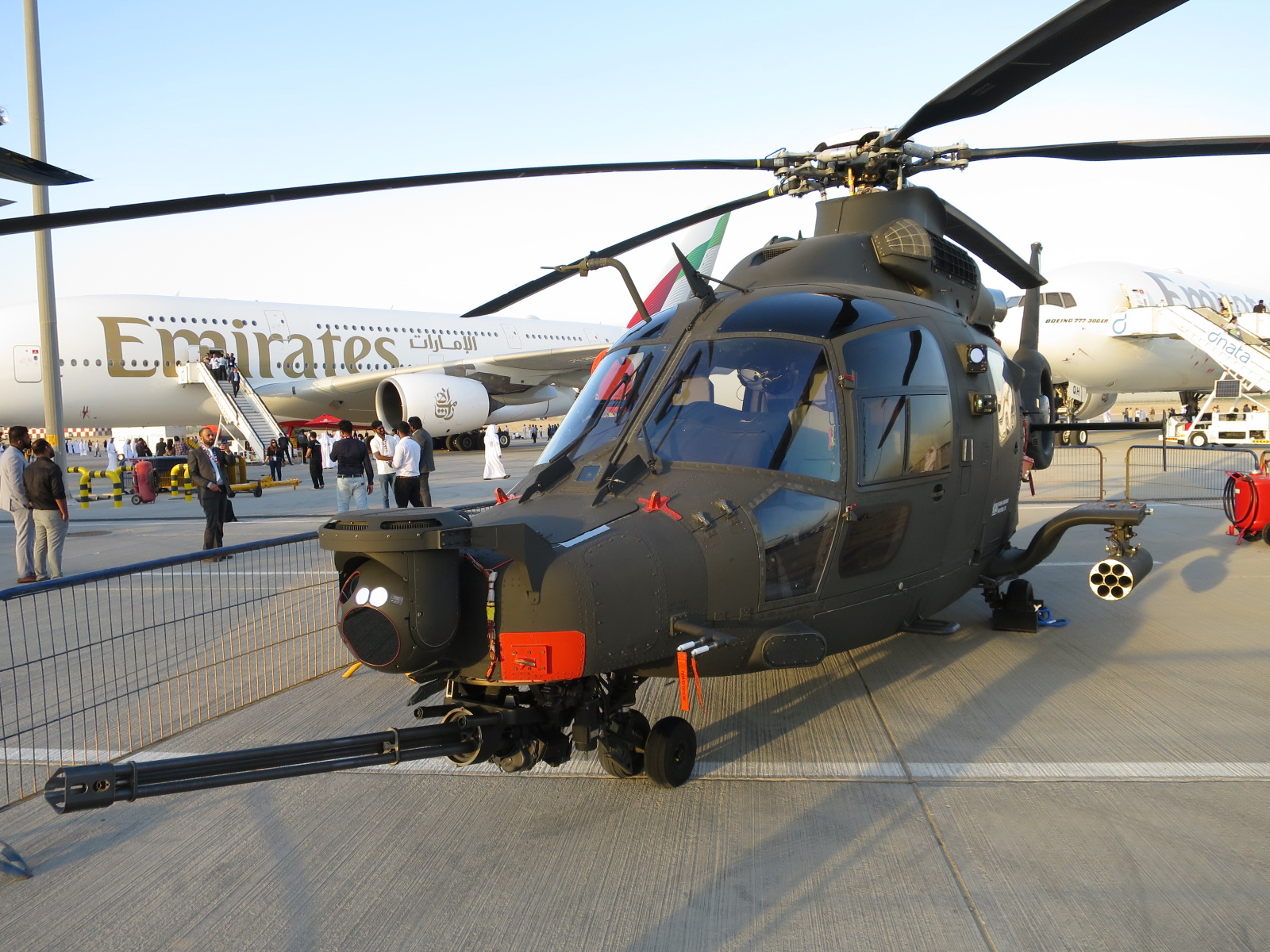
LAH fuselage front quarter view with target acquisition designation sights and 20 mm M197 rotary gun

The origins of the LAH can be traced back to the Eurocopter EC155, a mid-sized civil utility helicopter produced by the multinational manufacturer Airbus Helicopters. During 2015, Airbus Helicopters and Korean Aerospace Industries (KAI) jointly announced an agreement to transfer principle manufacturing activity of the EC155 to South Korea; under this arrangement, KAI would become the sole manufacturer of the type after 2018, and both firms shall be jointly involved in the international marketing and further development of the type. Furthermore, the EC155 served as the basis for two programmes headed by KAI: The Light Civil Helicopter (LCH) and Light Armed Helicopter (LAH).

At the time of the agreement, Airbus stated that it foresaw demand within South Korea for 100 LCHs and 214 LAHs, and estimates an international market of 300–400 LAH versions to replace legacy attack helicopters. The LAH is expected to replace both the MD Helicopters MD 500 Defender and Bell AH-1J/S Cobra helicopters operated by the Republic of Korea Army. Furthermore, KAI has declared its hope to sell the LAH overseas. In addition to KAI, South Korea's Defense Acquisition Program Administration (DAPA) along with several other South Korean agencies have given their support to the project. Furthermore, numerous European suppliers are also involved in the programme; in June 2016, the French firm Safran Group were selected to provide the Turbomeca Arriel powerplant for both the LAH and LCH.

=== Design ===
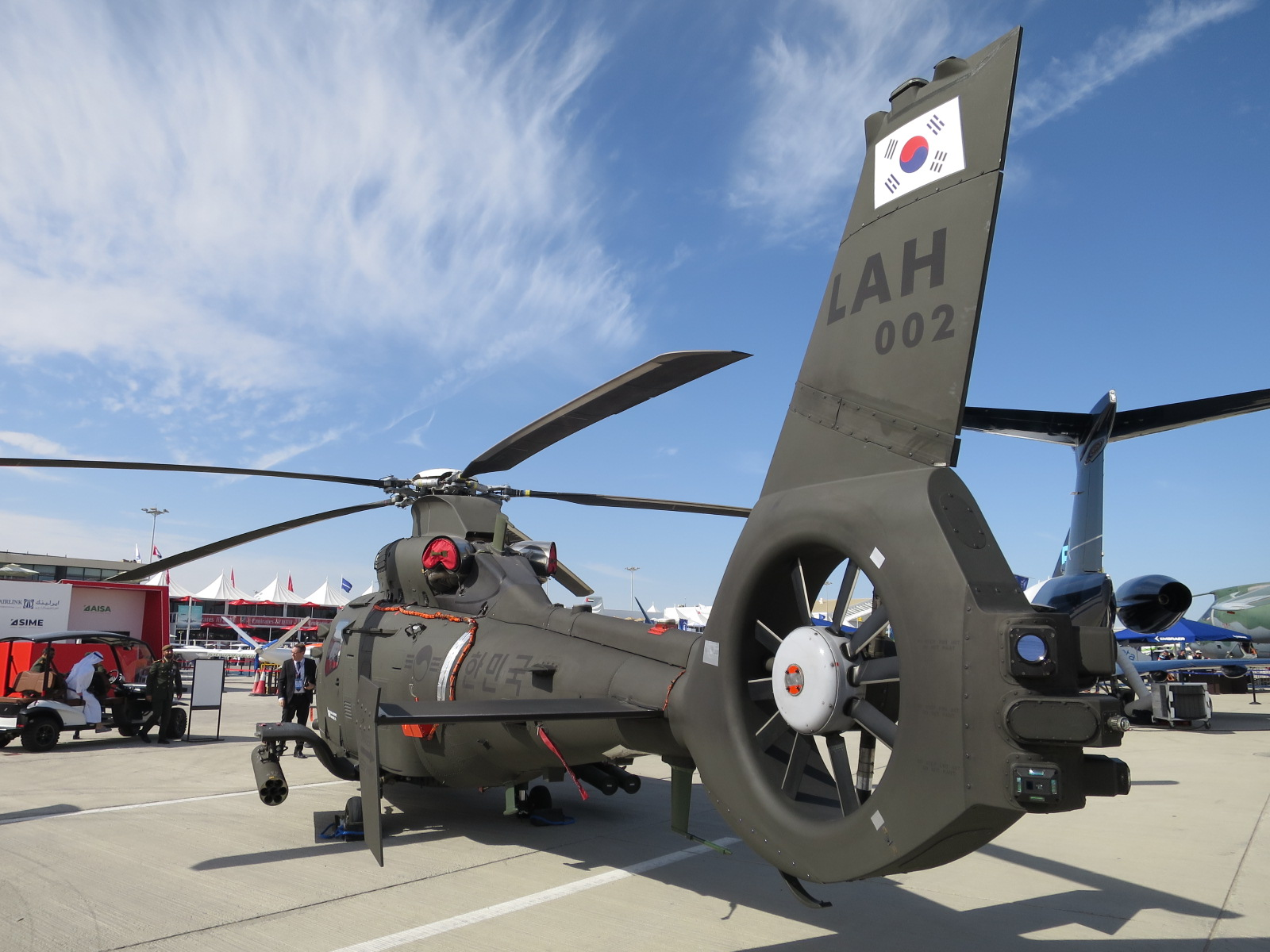
LAH Miron rear view

The LAH features numerous changes from the EC155 it is derived from, these include a new cockpit, improved gearbox, and redesigned rotor blades. Furthermore, LAH is capable of using multiple new armaments, has been furnished with survivability equipment, and has the ability to carry up to ten fully-equipped troops. The LAH has been designed to perform both attack and reconnaissance missions. The flight system include a 4-axis automatic flight control system (AFCS), while the dynamic systems are designed to minimise both noise and vibration. Crashworthy self-sealing fuel tanks are also fitted.

The LAH has been equipped with various avionics and apparatus to support its operations; these include a nose-mounted electro-optic/infrared sensor package, a target acquisition designation system (TADS), and a self-protection/electronic warfare suite, which includes a radar warning receiver (RWR), laser warning receiver (LWR), missile warning receiver (MWR), and chaff/flare dispensers. Its self-protection systems are reportedly designed to guard against man-portable air-defense systems (MANPADS). A precision navigation system has been included, which is reportedly resistant to hostile GPS jamming. The pilots are provided with helmet-mounted displays integrated with the fire control system.

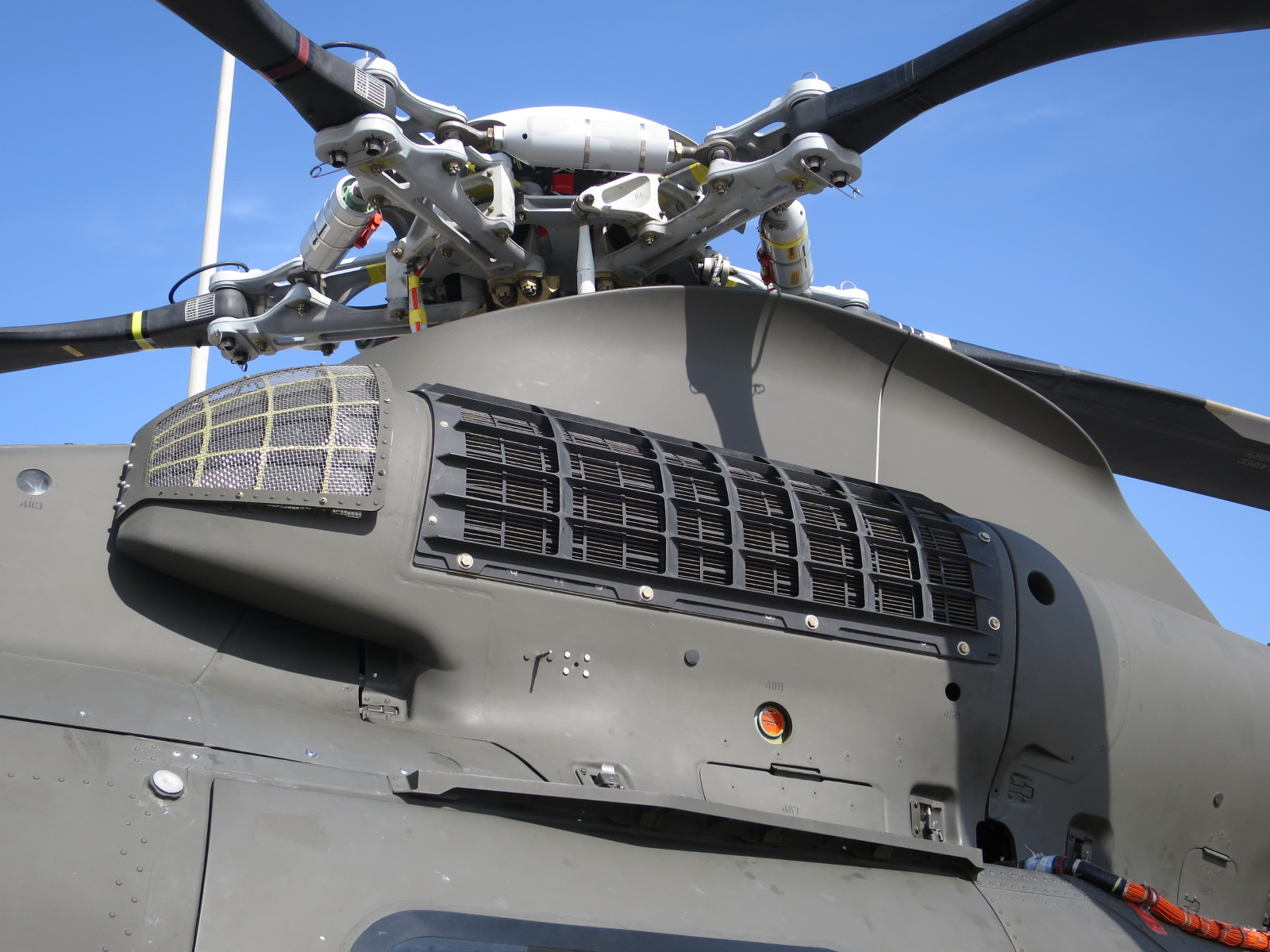
LAH engine and rotorhead

The LAH is armed with a single chin-mounted 20mm three-barreled turret gun and fitted with stub wings for carrying both 70 mm (2.8 in) non-guided rockets and air-to-ground anti-tank missiles. The Agency for Defense Development (ADD) and Hanwha developed a new anti-tank missile, initially referred to as the TAipers (Tank Snipers) or Light Armed Helicopter Air-to-Ground Missile (LAH-AGM), as the LAH's primary weapon. Guided by a dual CCD TV and imaging infrared (IIR) seeker delivering a fire-and-forget capability as well as a fire, observe and update mode using a fiber-optic data-link, it provides an anti-armor capability up to 8 kilometres (5.0 mi) away. Serial production of the missile is expected sometime in 2023, coinciding with the LAH's introduction. Later renamed Cheongeom (Korean: 천검), the missile is 120 mm (4.7 in) in diameter, weighs 16 kg (35 lb), can fly at 200 m/s (720 km/h; 450 mph), and is equipped with a tandem shaped-charge warhead with impact or time delay fuses. The LAH can carry four Cheongeoms, two on each side. Development of the missile was completed in December 2022. In 2021, KAI and Israel Aerospace Industries (IAI) signed a separate memorandum of understanding to develop loitering munitions that may be used on the LAH.

=== Flight test program ===
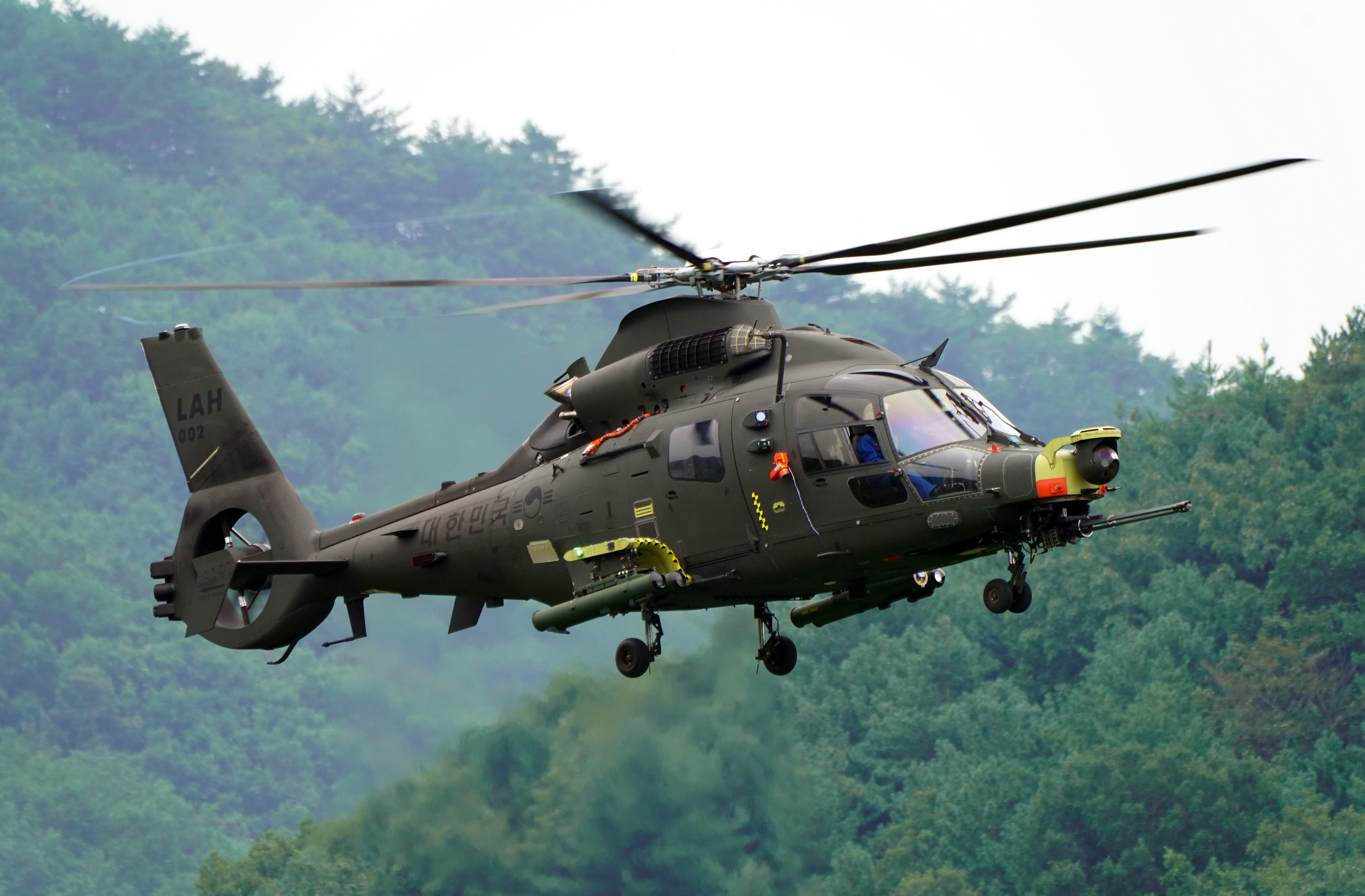
LAH prototype 002

In December 2018, the first prototype was unveiled. In April 2019, the LCH performed its first engine ground test.

On 4 July 2019, the first prototype performed its maiden flight; on 10 December 2019, it was followed by the second prototype. During December 2020, the LAH was declared to be fit for combat on a provisional basis by DAPA. In April 2021, KAI stated that both the 20mm cannon and 70mm rockets had been integrated with the LAH's target acquisition designation sight, and that testing of the air-to-ground missile would proceed within the year.

Between December 2021 and February 2022, cold weather testing of the LAH was conducted at Yellowknife, Canada, performing over 40 flights and testing 165 items over the course of nine weeks. DAPA announced on 18 February 2022 that these tests had successfully verified the helicopter's ability to withstand cold weather conditions without impacting either its manoeuvrability and general performance.

The company has also conceptualised an unmanned version of the LAH, which it promoted as intended to work in coordination with a manned LAH. In October 2021 the South Korean government issued a contract for development of the unmanned LAH. During 2022, the LAH's manned-unmanned teaming capability was formally evaluated. KAI has stated its intention to equip the helicopter with a canister-launched unmanned aerial vehicle (UAV).

In September 2022, KAI unveiled a new variant, the Light Utility Helicopter (LUH), which is intended to support operations by special forces; it is based on the LAH, but has been stripped of non-essential equipment and its troop-carrying capability maximised, not only using the internal cabin but also outboard benches akin to those used on the Boeing MH-6M Little Bird.

On 23 December 2022, DAPA signed a 302 billion won (US$235 million) deal with KAI to begin producing 10 LAH units and start deliveries in December 2024. Airbus Helicopters and KAI agreed to start serial production in August 2023.

On 26 December 2024, the Korean Army received the first model of the homegrown Light Armed Helicopter.

== Operators ==
=== Current operators ===
South Korea

- Republic of Korea Army

== Specifications ==
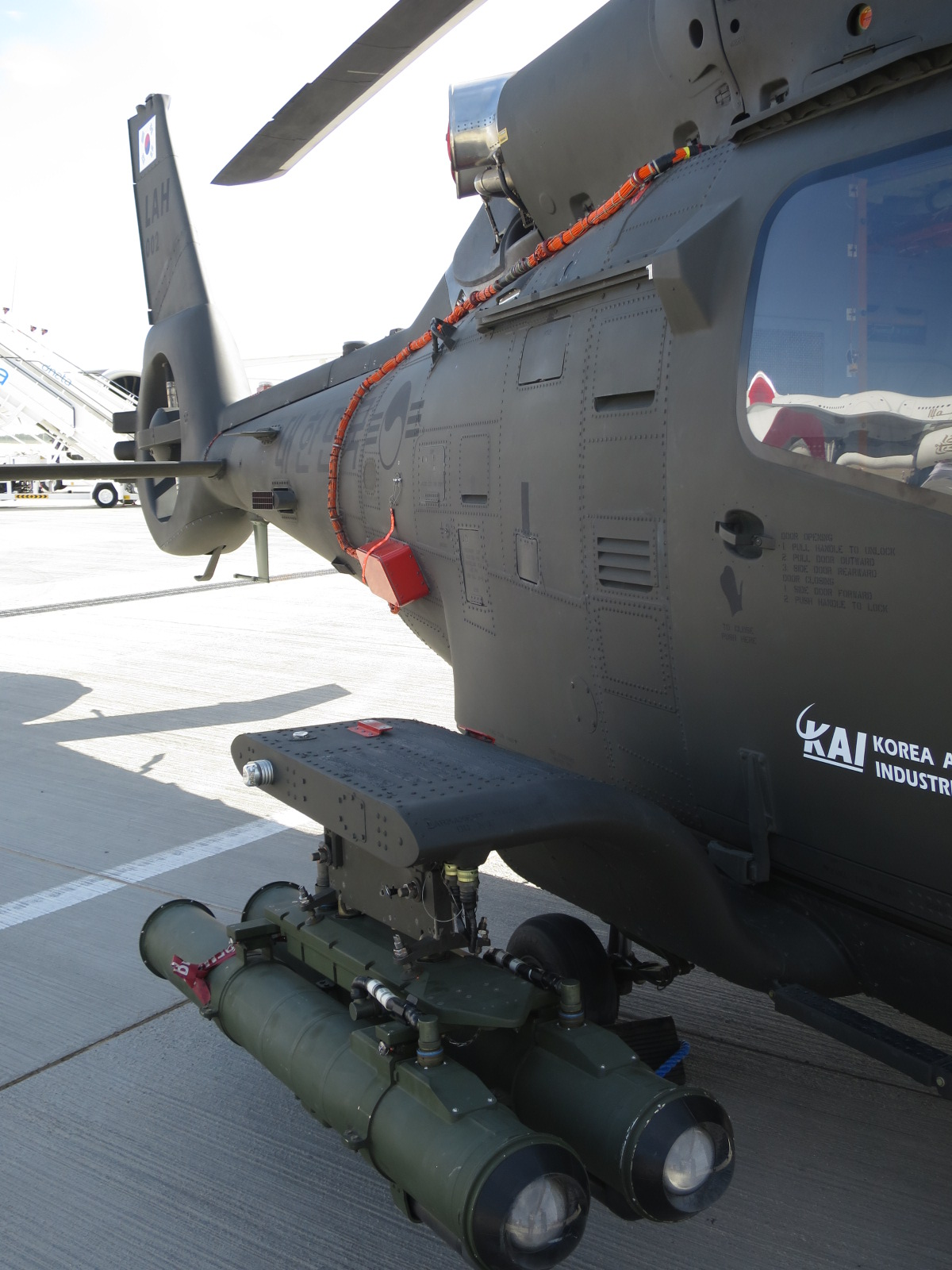
LAH weapons pylon and Cheongeom (TAipers) anti-tank guided missiles

Data from Korea Aerospace Industries, Hanwha Systems

General characteristics

- Crew: 2 (pilots)
- Capacity: 2 x 20mm Magazines (Cabin)
- Length: 14.3 m (46 ft 11 in)
- Width: 3.9 m (12 ft 10 in) (fuselage)
- Height: 4.3 m (14 ft 1 in)
- Empty weight: 3,400 kg (7,496 lb)
- Gross weight: 4,950 kg (10,913 lb)
- Max takeoff weight: 4,920 kg (10,847 lb)
- Powerplant: 2 × HAS-Arriel 2L2 turboshaft engines, Take-off Power, 770 kW (1,030 hp) each
- Main rotor diameter: 12.6 m (41 ft 4 in)
- Main rotor area: 124.7 m^{2} (1,342 sq ft)

Performance

- Maximum speed: 243 km/h (151 mph, 131 kn)
- Range: 857 km (533 mi, 463 nmi)
- Ferry range: 985 km (612 mi, 532 nmi)
- Service ceiling: 4,572 m (15,000 ft)
- Rate of climb: 8.9 m/s (1,750 ft/min)

Armament

- Guns: 1× 20mm M197 electric cannon three-barreled electric Gatling-type rotary cannon
- Hardpoints: 4 , with provisions to carry combinations of:
  - Rockets:
    - 2 × seven-shot rocket launcher Hydra 70 (1 launcher on each side)
  - Missiles:
    - Air-to-surface missiles:
      - 4 × TAipers Air-to-surface missile (2 on each side)

Avionics

- Hanwha Target Acquisition Designation System (TDAS)
- Hanwha electronic warfare system
  - Radar Warning Receiver (RWR)
  - Laser Warning Receiver (LWR)
  - Missile Warning Receiver (MWR)
- Hanwha control display unit
- Hanwha audio interface unit
- Korean Variable Message Format (KVMF) data link

== See also ==
- HAL Rudra
- HAL Prachand
- Eurocopter Tiger
- Harbin Z-19
