= KAI LCH =

South Korean civil helicopter

LCH (Light Civil Helicopter)
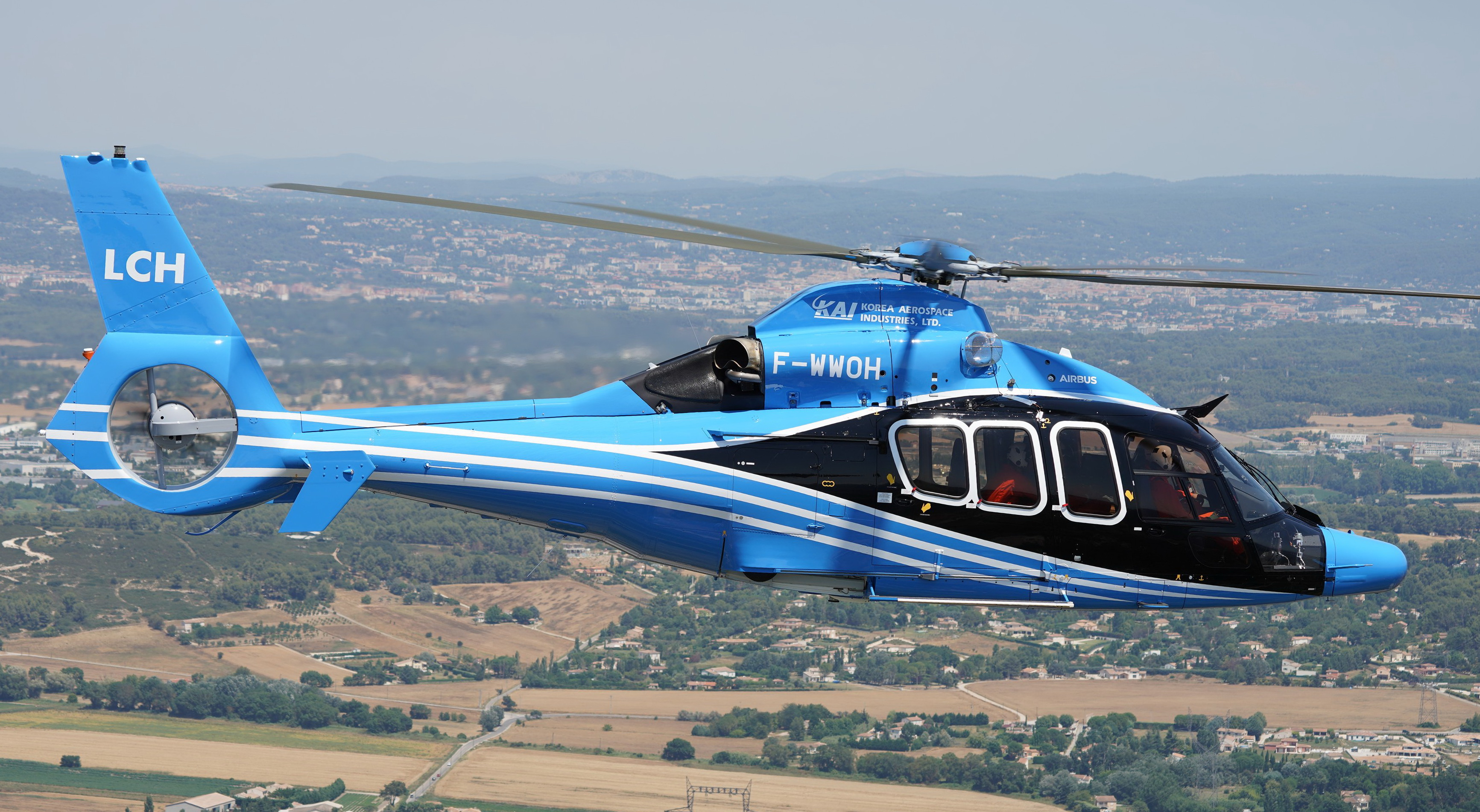
- LCH prototype

General information
- Type: Civil transport helicopter
- National origin: South Korea
- Manufacturer: Korea Aerospace Industries
- Designer: Korea Aerospace Industries; Airbus Helicopters
- Status: During test flight
- Number built: 2

History
- First flight: 24 July 2018
- Developed from: Airbus Helicopters H155

The KAI LCH (Light Civil Helicopter, Korean: 소형민수헬기) is a medium-sized twin-engined civil helicopter manufactured by the South Korean aerospace manufacturer Korea Aerospace Industries (KAI). It is derived from the Eurocopter EC155 and is closely related to the Light Armed Helicopter (LAH), a militarised rotorcraft intended for battlefield operations.

Development of the LCH commenced in June 2015 with an agreement between the multinational rotorcraft manufacturer Airbus Helicopters and KAI under which the former committed to transferring production of the EC155 to the latter, while the two companies would jointly market, sell, and develop the type for the international market. On 24 July 2018, the first prototype LCH made its maiden flight in Marignane, France. On 5 December 2019, the second prototype made its first flight from Sacheon, South Korea. During September 2022, type certification for the LCH was received from the South Korean aviation authorities; the first production rotorcraft was delivered in the following month.

== History ==
During June 2015, it was announced that the multinational rotorcraft manufacturer Airbus Helicopters and the South Korean aerospace giant Korean Aerospace Industries (KAI) had signed contracts for the transfer principle manufacturing activity for the Eurocopter EC155, a medium-sized helicopter, from France to South Korea. Under the terms of the agreement between the two companies, KAI shall become the sole manufacturer of the type after 2018, while both companies shall be jointly engaged in the international marketing, sales, and further development of the rotorcraft. Furthermore, the EC155 would be become the basis for two new helicopters produced by KAI: the Light Civil Helicopter (LCH) and Light Armed Helicopter (LAH), which shall feature numerous improvements, including a new cockpit, improved gearbox, and redesigned rotor blades.

Reportedly, the development of the LCH had $460 million of funding allocation, $293 million of which was sourced from the South Korean government while the remainder has been provided by the various private companies involved in the programme. At the time of the partnership announcement, the LCH had an anticipated in-service date of 2020. The initiative incorporates some technologies, and a level of commonality, with that of the earlier KAI KUH-1 Surion utility helicopter programme. One specific technology shared is the digital four-axis autopilot, which is fitted upon both the Surion and the EC155; it provides relatively stable hover performance even under extreme conditions, along with precision settings for altitude, speed and headwind. The latest technologies of the EC155 family have been made available for incorporation into both the LCH and LAH. The powerplant for the LCH (and LAH) is the Arriel 2L2 turboshaft engine, which was co-developed by Safran Helicopter Engines and Hanwha Techwin, the latter producing the engine under license from the former at its facility in Changwon, South Korea.

On 24 July 2018, the first prototype LCH conducted its maiden flight in Marignane, France. According to Airbus, this flight had taken place two months ahead of the contracted schedule, and that early flight testing would be performed by Airbus in France as part of their agreement with KAI to provide technical support for the programme. Airbus is to undertake a full technology transfer to KAI so that it would be capable of developing its own indigenous rotorcraft. On 5 December 2019, the second prototype made its first flight from KAI's headquarters in Sacheon, South Korea; unlike the first prototype, this one was assembled locally. The helicopter is reportedly equipped with 80 components and/or systems that were produced in South Korea, including the rotor blades, automatic flight control system, and active vibration damping system. In September 2020, it was announced that the transfer of EC155 production from France to South Korea would take place during the following year.

During September 2022, type certification for the LCH was received from the South Korean aviation authorities. It has been designed to be fully compliance with the standards of the European Union Aviation Safety Agency (EASA), facilitating its use with many international operators. In the following month, the first production standard LCH was delivered to a local operator, Gloria Aviation, which will use it to provide emergency medical services (EMS) around Jeju Island from December 2022 onwards. It is envisioned that the type will perform in mission roles such as search and rescue (SAR), air ambulance, utility, law enforcement, and aerial firefighting.

== Specifications ==
Data from Korea Aerospace Industries

General characteristics

- Crew: 2
- Capacity: 15 passengers
- Length: 12.7 m (41 ft 8 in)
- Width: 3.5 m (11 ft 6 in) (fuselage)
- Height: 4.4 m (14 ft 5 in)
- Max takeoff weight: 4,919.6 kg (10,846 lb)
- Powerplant: 2 × HAS-Arriel 2L2 turboshaft engines, Take-off Power, 703.2 kW (943.0 hp) each

Performance

- Maximum speed: 265 km/h (165 mph, 143 kn)
