= Eurocopter AS365 Dauphin =

Multi-role helicopter family by Aérospatiale

SA 365 Dauphin 2 AS365 Dauphin
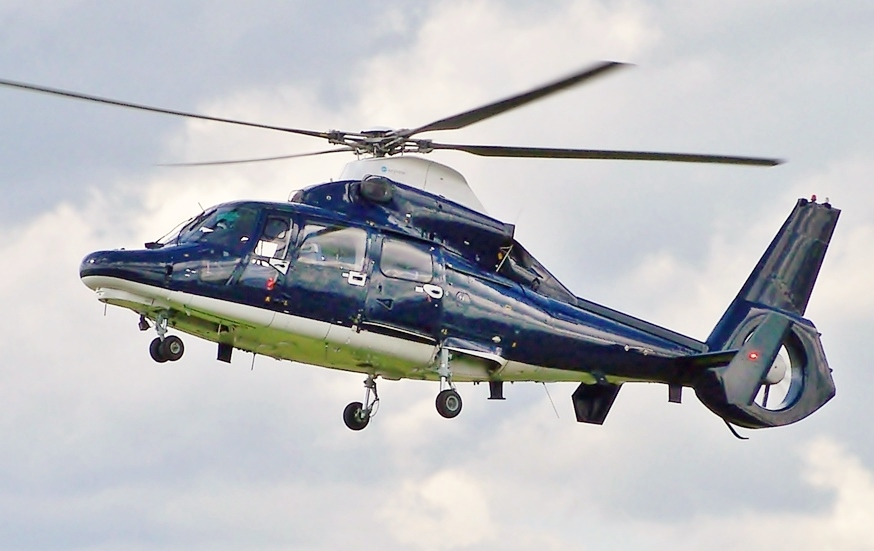
- A British Army Air Corps Dauphin 2 landing at Glasgow Airport, Scotland

General information
- Type: Medium utility helicopter
- National origin: France
- Manufacturer: Aérospatiale; Eurocopter; Airbus Helicopters
- Status: In service
- Primary user: Pawan Hans
- Number built: 1,098

History
- Manufactured: 1975–2021
- Introduction date: December 1978
- First flight: 24 January 1975
- Developed from: Aérospatiale SA 360 Dauphin
- Variants: Eurocopter HH-65 Dolphin; Eurocopter AS565 Panther; Harbin Z-9
- Developed into: Eurocopter EC155; Eurocopter X3

The Eurocopter, later Airbus Helicopters AS365 Dauphin, originally known as the Aérospatiale SA 365 Dauphin 2, is a medium-weight multipurpose twin-engine helicopter produced by Airbus Helicopters. It was originally developed and manufactured by French firm Aérospatiale, which was merged into the multinational Eurocopter company during the 1990s, and since 2014 Eurocopter was renamed Airbus Helicopters. Since entering production in 1975, the type has been in continuous production for more than 40 years, with the last delivery in 2021. The intended successor to the Dauphin is the Airbus Helicopters H160, which entered operational service in 2021.

The Dauphin 2 shares many similarities with the Aérospatiale SA 360, a commercially unsuccessful single-engine helicopter; however the twin-engine Dauphin 2 did meet with customer demand and has been operated by a wide variety of civil and military operators. Since the type's introduction in the 1970s, several major variations and specialised versions of the Dauphin 2 have been developed and entered production, including the military-oriented Eurocopter Panther, the air-sea rescue HH/MH-65 Dolphin, the Chinese-manufactured Harbin Z-9, and the Eurocopter EC155.

== Development ==
The SA 365/AS365 Dauphin 2 is a twin-engine development of the commercially unsuccessful single-engined Aérospatiale SA 360 Dauphin; only a year after the SA 360's entry into service, Aerospatiale had recognized that a platform powered by two engines rather than one was better suited to both civil and military operations, thus a redesign program was initiated. On 24 January 1975, the first twin-engine Dauphin prototype performed its first flight; the prototype soon demonstrated an airspeed of 170 knots in level flight and set multiple speed records, among them the Paris-London trip at an average of 321 km/h.

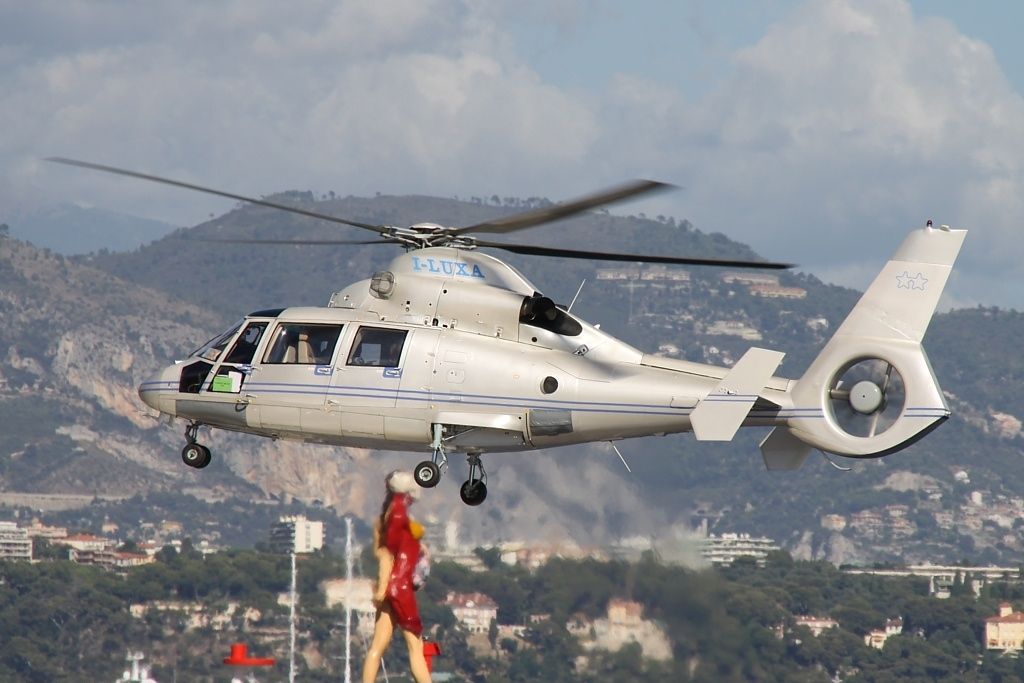
A Dauphin in flight, 2010

The initial production variant entered service under the original designation of SA 365C; French certification of this model was received in July 1978, with US FAA and British CAA certification following later that year. Deliveries to customers began in December 1978. In 1982, the SA 356C Dauphin was succeeded by the more capable SA 365 N. Amongst several major design changes and improvements, the SA 365 N featured more powerful engines, greater use of composite materials, a better cabin arrangement, and retractable landing gear.

Further improvements were made with the introduction of the SA 365 N1, which had a substantially redesigned Fenestron anti-torque device, and with the SA 365 N2, which was equipped with more powerful Turbomeca Arriel 1C2 turboshaft engines. In January 1990, the overall type was formally redesignated as the AS365. The AS365 Dauphin is one of Eurocopter's more successful helicopter designs; and has been widely used as a corporate transport, airborne law enforcement platform, emergency medical services (EMS) helicopter, electronic news gathering platform, and search and rescue helicopter.

The base Dauphin has been further developed into several purpose-built variants. During the 1980s, the SA 365 N was used as the basis for a militarised version of the Dauphin, initially designed as AS 365 K, which was used to perform utility, troop-transport, and maritime operations, widely known as the Eurocopter Panther. A variant of the Dauphin was specifically developed for and operated principally by the United States Coast Guard under the designation HH/MH-65 Dolphin. The SA 365 M model of the Dauphin has also been manufactured under licence in China as the Z-9 by the Harbin Aircraft Manufacturing Corporation; the Z-9 was subsequently developed into the armed Z-9W and Z-19 attack helicopter.

== Design ==
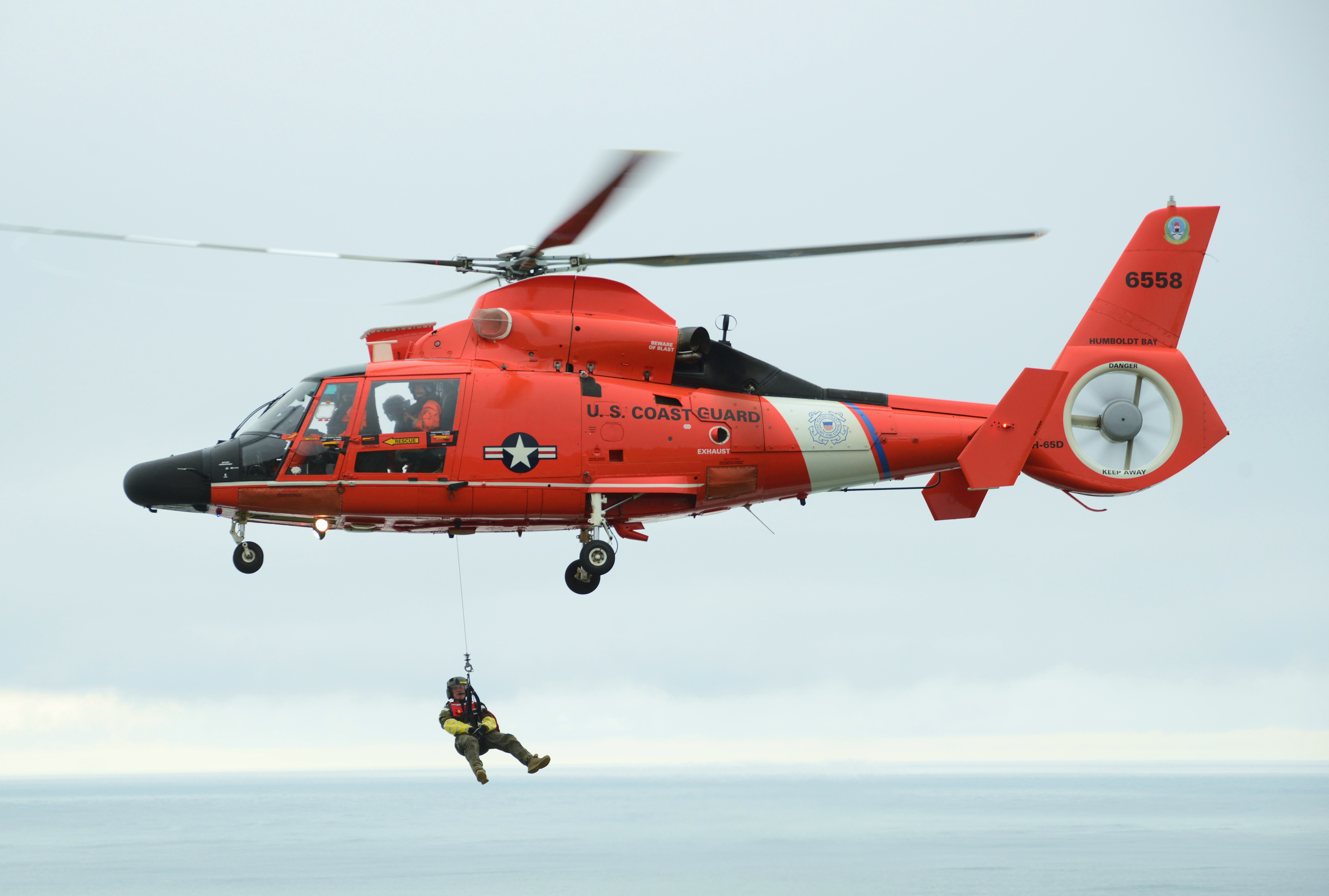
Dauphin rescue version, shown here on training exercise

The AS365 Dauphin is a twin-engine helicopter capable of travelling long ranges, and well suited to operating in climates of a high ambient temperature or at locations of significant altitude. The Dauphin is typically powered by a pair of Turbomeca Arriel turboshaft engines; on later variants, these are equipped with FADEC units, which provide additional functionality such as an automated start-up sequence and a training mode. The engines drive the rotorcraft's foldable Starflex main rotor and its Fenestron anti-torque tail rotor via two separate transmissions; these gearboxes are also connected to two separate hydraulic systems as well as a stand-by hydraulic system for emergency use, such as deployment of the landing gear. Electrical power is provided by a pair of starter generators and a NiCad (Nickel-Cadmium) main battery; an emergency battery is also present. The combination of the rotorcraft's Starflex main rotor and Fenestron tail provides a low-noise and low-vibration flight experience for those on board; Airbus Helicopters has claimed the sound emissions of the AS365 N3 to be 3.1 decibels below International Civil Aviation Organization (ICAO) standards, making it the quietest helicopter in its class. The Dauphin can take off under a full load from sea level under Category A conditions.

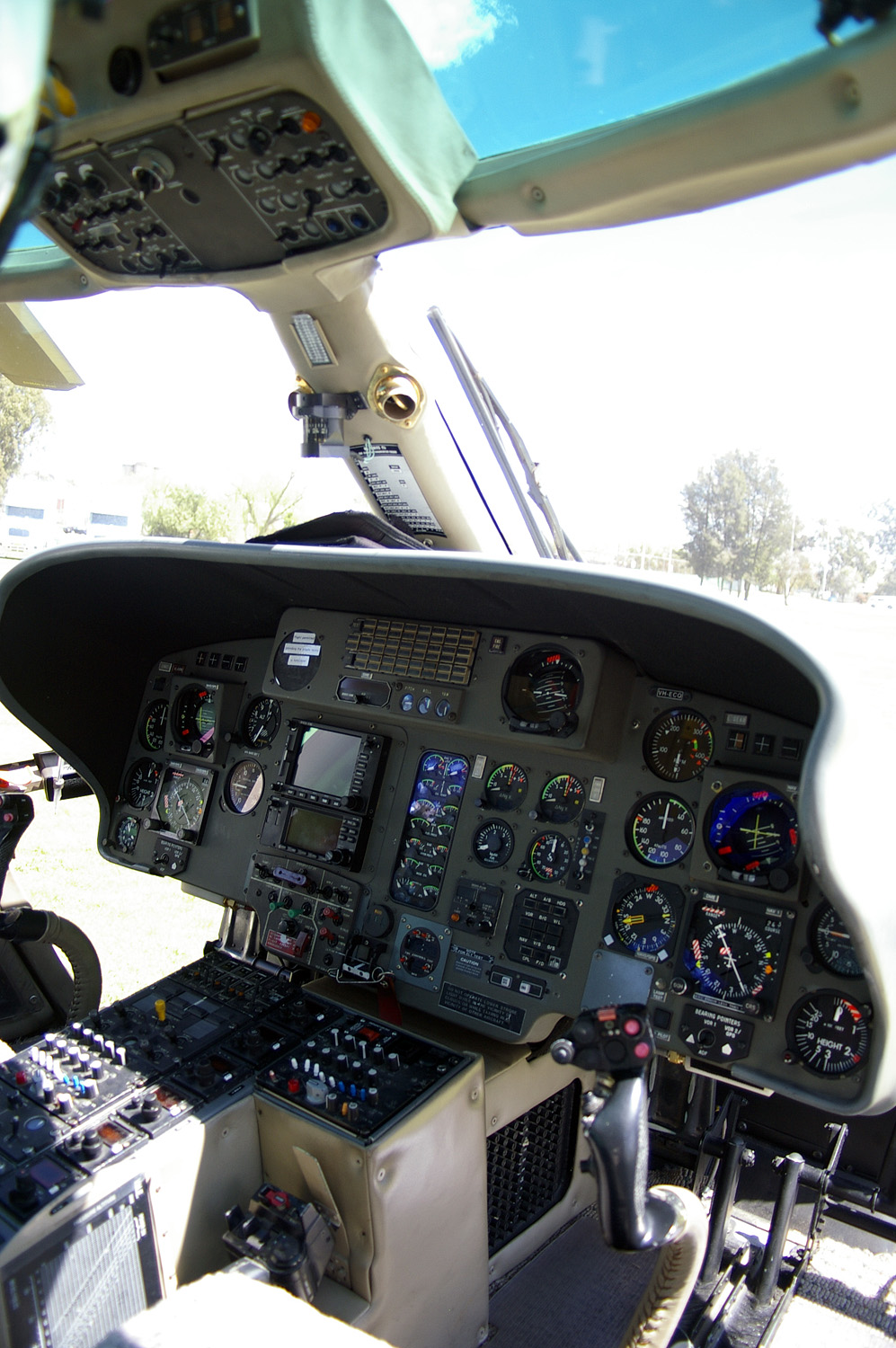
Cockpit of an AS365 N2

The main fuselage of the rotorcraft comprises the cabin area, a separate luggage compartment, and a retractable tricycle landing gear arrangement; a total of four conventional doors to access the main cabin are typically installed, which can be optionally replaced by a single clamshell air stair entrance instead. Various portions of the rotorcraft are made from composite materials, such as the rotor blades that made of carbon fiber, other materials are used in portions of the fuselage. The fuselage features anti-corrosion protection and is structurally reinforced for an optional hoist or cargo sling to be installed, various other mooring and gripping points are also fitted on the rotocraft's exterior surface. Various types and models of radar can be installed in the Dauphin's nose.

The main cabin area is designed to be reconfigurable, a feature which is promoted to emergency medical service (EMS) and search and rescue (SAR) operators. In a regular passenger transport layout, the cabin can accommodate up to 12 passengers in addition to the two pilots; up to seven passengers can be accommodated in a VIP layout. Access to the cabin is via large sliding doors on either side of the helicopter, built-in boarding steps are typically installed to ease the boarding of passengers.

While the cockpit is typically equipped with dual flight controls for two-man operations, the Dauphin can be readily flown by a single pilot while operating under instrument flight rules; this was achieved in part by avionics such as the 4-axis Dual Digital Automatic Flight Control System (older production aircraft use a 3-axis flight control system with integrated autopilot instead) to reduce crew workload. The principal flight control system are connected to a total of 3 dual-chamber primary servo-units for cyclical and collective pitch control, and a single dual-chamber rear servo-unit for tail rotor pitch control. Other major avionics include 10.4-inch (26 cm) multi-mission touch screen displays, weather radar, global positioning system (GPS) receiver, traffic alert and collision avoidance system (TCAS), automatic voice alarm device (AVAD), health and usage monitoring system (HUMS), quick access records for helicopter flight data management, and digital audio communication system (DACS).

== Operational history ==
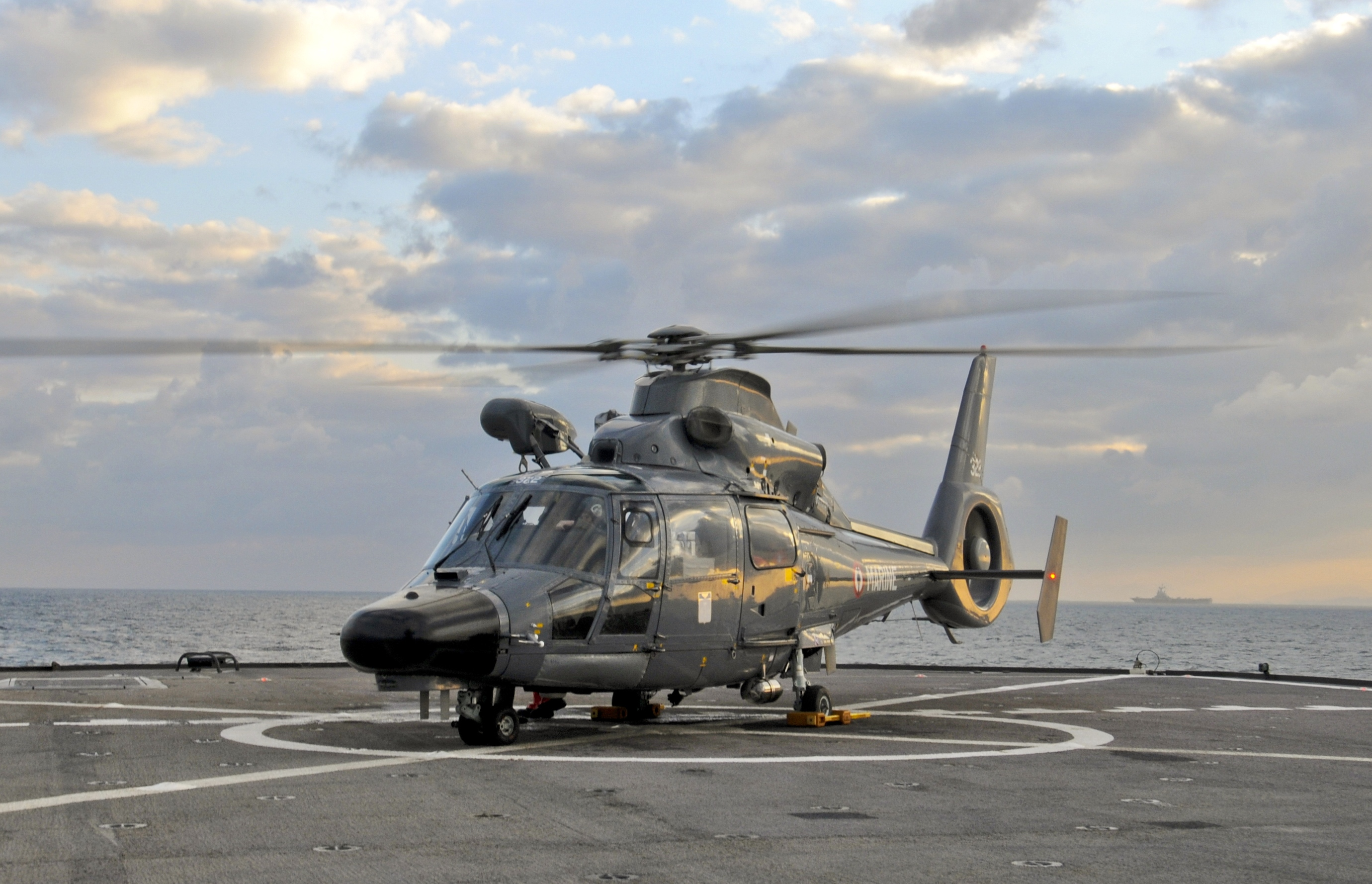
A French Navy AS365 F Dauphin aboard USS Mount Whitney during Opération Harmattan, 2010

In February 1980, the first series production Dauphin was used to break three separate speed-related world records in separate journeys between Battersea, London, United Kingdom and Issy-les-Moulineaux, Paris, France. In 1985, a new model of the Dauphin, the AS365 F, became the first rotorcraft in the world to fly with flight instruments being displayed in electronic displays, which replaced the traditional instrumentation; this variant was first procured by the Irish Air Corps for SAR operations.

The French Navy operated the Dauphin, in addition to the dedicated military-orientated Panther variant, to conduct various missions such as the Dauphin Service Public which involves various duties from seaborne SAR, maritime monitoring, and responding to distress calls. French Navy Dauphins are commonly deployed on board the aircraft carrier Charles de Gaulle as well as onboard other vessels of the French Navy and allies; they are fitted with a haul-down Harpoon in order to ease shipboard landings in rough weather.

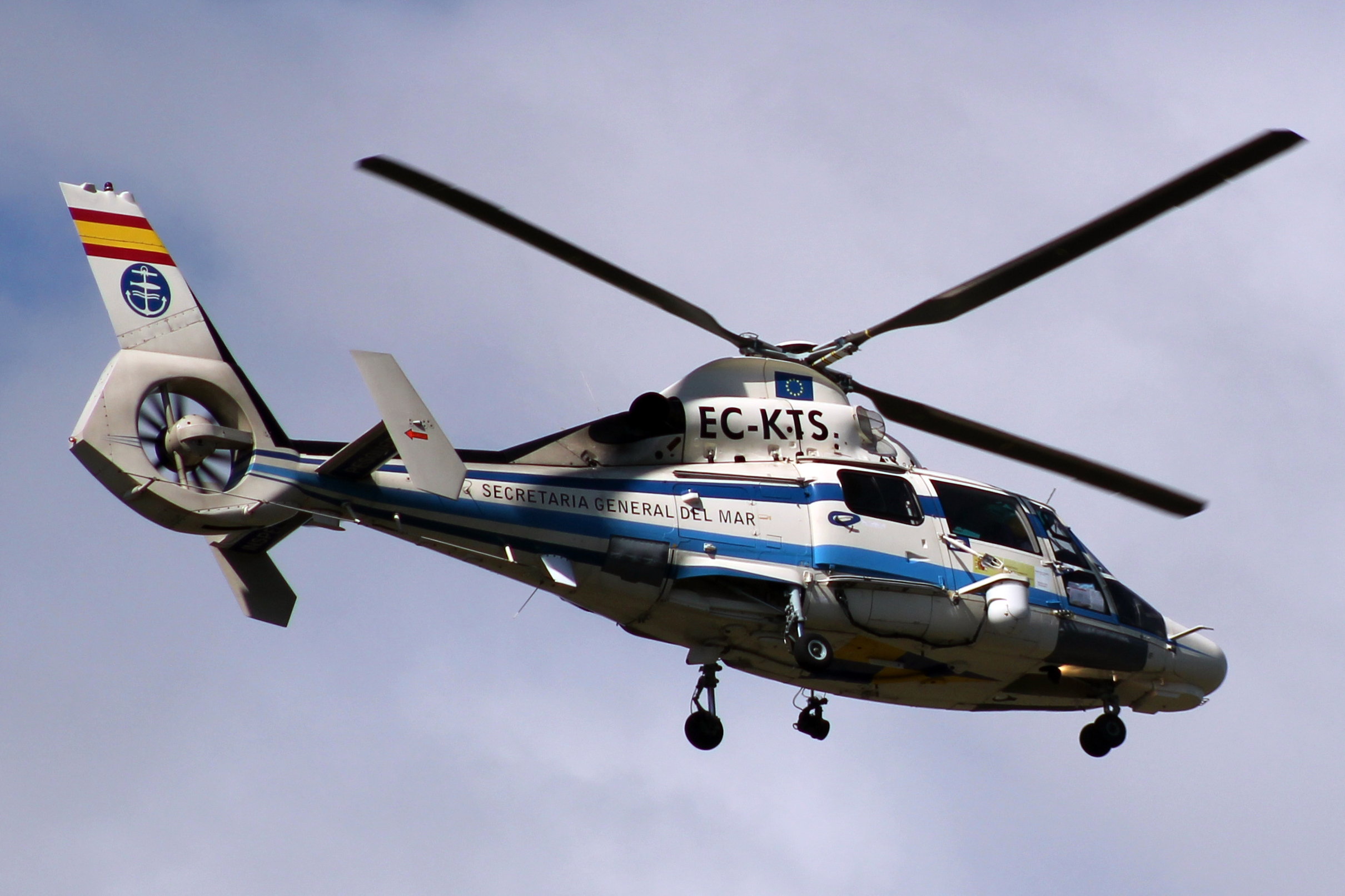
Dauphin AS365 N3, 2014

By 1980, a total of 265 AS360/361/365 Dauphins had been delivered, 90% of these deliveries were to foreign customers in a total of 23 different nations. Amongst the biggest early customers for the type was Saudi Arabia, which ordered 24 Dauphins, and Angola, with an order for 17 Dauphins. The largest civil customers of the type has been Indian operator Pawan Hans, who by 2003 had a fleet of 19 Dauphins (nearly two-thirds of their total rotary fleet) and were in the process of procuring another 1 Dauphins to allow older aircraft to be phased out; they have been frequently used to support offshore oil extraction activities.

In February 1991, it was announced that the 500th Dauphin had been delivered to Bond Helicopters, who at that time operated a total of 15 of the type, with additional Dauphins on order. By 1991, the Dauphin was being operated by 138 customers across casi 45 nations. In December 2006, Eurocopter president Fabrice Brégier stated that between 30 and 40 Dauphins were being delivered each year. By 2012, more than 1,000 AS365/366/565 versions had been produced; Pawan Hans took delivery of the 1,000th Dauphin produced in April 2011, at which point the type was reportedly in service with over 300 operators worldwide.

Prior to the 2004 Summer Olympics, five AS 356N3 Dauphins were procured for the Hellenic Coast Guard for harbor surveillance purposes. Between 2009 and 2012, the Army Air Corps of the United Kingdom took delivery of five Dauphins, these were assigned to No. 658 Squadron AAC to replace four AgustaWestland A109 helicopters being used to support Special Air Service (SAS) operations.

As of 2014, the AS365 N variant of the Dauphin holds the world speed record for a 3-kilometre (1.9 mi) course, set at 372 km/h (231 mph) in 1991.

== Variants ==
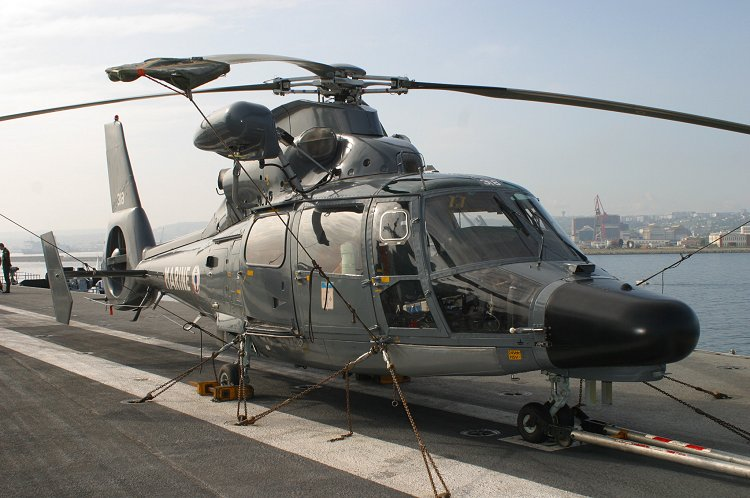
A French Navy AS365 F Dauphin rescue helicopter on the deck of the aircraft carrier Charles de Gaulle in June 2004

=== Civilian variants ===
SA 365 C
A twin-engined version of the original Dauphin, designated as the Dauphin 2, was announced in early 1973. The first prototype's first flight took place on 24 January 1975; production model deliveries began in December 1978. In comparison with the earlier model, the SA 365 C featured twin 470 kW (630 shp) Arriel 1 turboshafts in a new engine fairing, a Starflex main rotor hub and a higher maximum take-off weight (3,400 kg; 7,496 lb). Its Fenestron anti-torque device featured 13 metal blades. Production of both the SA 360 and SA 365 C ceased in 1981, by which time approximately 40 SA 360s and 50 SA 365 C/C1s had been built; both were replaced by the SA 365 N.

SA 365 C1
Variant powered by Arriel 1A1 certified in March 1979.

SA 365 C2
Variant powered by Arriel 1A2 certified in February 1980.

SA 365 C3
Variant powered by Arriel 1C certified in January 1982.

SA 365 N
A much improved version of the SA 365 C Dauphin 2, the first prototype flying on 31 March 1979. This version introduced the uprated 492 kW (660 shp) Arriel 1C turboshafts, a retractable tricycle undercarriage, enlarged tail surfaces, and revised transmission, main rotor, rotor mast fairing and engine cowlings. The aircraft's initial M.T.O.W. of 3,850 kg (8,490 lb) was later raised to 4,000 kg (8,800 lb). Deliveries of the production model began in 1982.

SA 365 N1
Incorporating many of the improvements developed for the SA 366 G1 (HH-65 Dolphin), this version introduced upgraded 526 kW (705 shp) Arriel 1C1 turboshafts, an improved 11-blade Fenestron with wider-chord blades (which reduced the AS365 N1's noise signature), movable undercarriage doors replaced by simplified fairings and a higher gross weight of 4,100 kg (9,000 lb).

AS 365 N2
This version – designated AS365 N2 from the outset – introduced the upgraded 549 kW (736 shp) Arriel 1C2 turboshafts, an uprated gearbox, increased maximum take-off weight of 4,250 kg (9,370 lb), redesigned cabin doors and revised interior, enlarged tail fin with all composite Fenestron. Deliveries of this version started in 1990. Licensed versions were assembled in China as the Z-9, Z-19 and AVIC AC312.

AS365 N3
The high-performance AS365 N3 was developed for operations in 'hot and high' climates, and introduced 635 kW (852 shp) Arriel 2C turboshafts equipped with a single channel DECU (Digital Engine Control Unit) with manual reversion, mated to an uprated main transmission for better single engine performance. The AS365 N3 also features a redesigned ten blade composite Fenestron anti-torque device with asymmetric blade distribution, offering a further reduction in noise signature. The AS365 N3's gross weight is 4,300 kg (9,500 lb). Production deliveries began in December 1998. The last one was delivered on 21 January 2022.

AS365 N3+
This version was presented at the 2009 Paris Air Show and differs mainly in new avionics including 4-axis auto-pilot This version is currently still in production.

AS365 N4
Produced as the EC155.

AS365 X
Better known as the DGV 200 or Dauphin Grand Vitesse (High Speed Dauphin), the AS365 X was developed from the X-380 DTP (Developpement Technique Probatoire or Probatory Technical Development) testbed, first flown on 20 March 1989. The aircraft was first flown in the AS365 X configuration two years later in March 1991, and featured a smaller Fenestron, a new main rotor with five high-inertia blades with swept tips, a composite rotor hub/mast and 624 kW (837 shp) Turbomeca Arriel IX turboshafts. On 19 November 1991, this aircraft set a Class E1e (3,000 to 4,500 kg; 6,600 to 9,900 lb) speed record of 201 knots (372 km/h; 231 mph) over a 3 km (1.9 mi) triangular course.

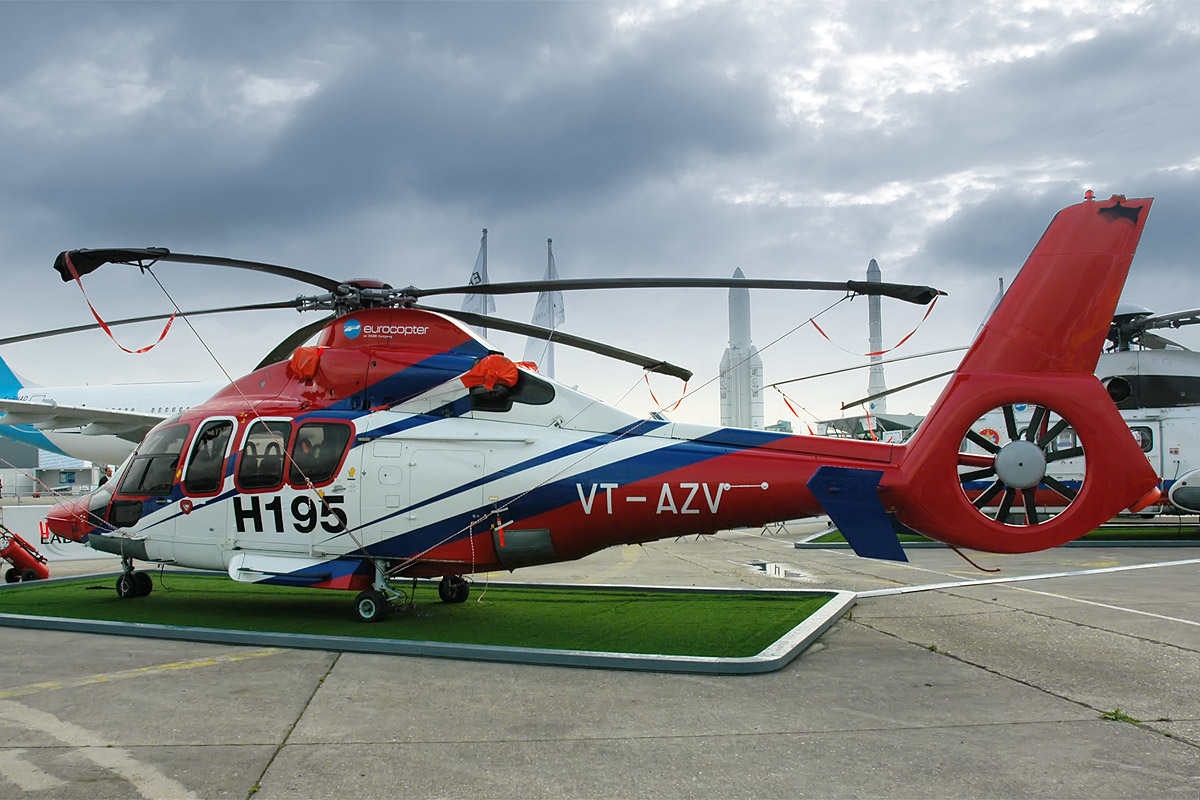
Eurocopter EC155 B1 at Paris Air Show 2007

EC155 B/B1

This version was originally to follow the N3 as the AS365 N4, and was announced at the 1997 Paris Airshow before being redesignated as the EC155 B. As with the N3 version, it has two Arriel 2C/2C2 turboshafts equipped with FADEC as well as a five blade Spheriflex main rotor (derived from the AS365 X DGV). It also features a 30% larger main cabin (achieved with bulged doors and cabin plugs). The first flight of the first prototype took place on 17 June 1997 and this version is currently in production (as the EC155 B1).

=== Military variants ===
AS565 Panther

- See Eurocopter AS565 Panther

SA 366 G1 Dauphin
The SA 366 G1 Dauphin version was selected by the US Coast Guard (USCG) in 1979 as its new air-sea rescue helicopter and given the designation HH-65A Dolphin. In total 99 helicopters, optimized for the USCG's short-range recovery (SRR) search and rescue role, were initially acquired, with additional aircraft later procured.

SA 365 N Dauphin
A much improved version of the SA 365 C Dauphin 2, the first prototype flying on 31 March 1979. This version introduced the upgraded 492 kW (660 shp) Arriel 1C turbo-shafts, a retractable tricycle undercarriage, enlarged tail surfaces, and revised transmission, main rotor, rotor mast fairing and engine cowlings. The aircraft's initial M.T.O.W. of 3,850 kg (8,490 lb) was later raised to 4,000 kg (8,800 lb). Deliveries of the production model began in 1982.

SA 365 F Dauphin
The SA 365 F is a variant of the SA 365 N for the French Navy. It has been used since 1991 for general duties and for backup purposes aboard an aircraft carrier. A helicopter with rescue divers is always in the air during flight operations to be able to assist the pilot in case of an accident. First experiments were successfully carried out in 1990 on board the French aircraft carrier Clemenceau. The variant 365F is used since 1999 with Flottille 35F called AS365F Dauphin Pedro.

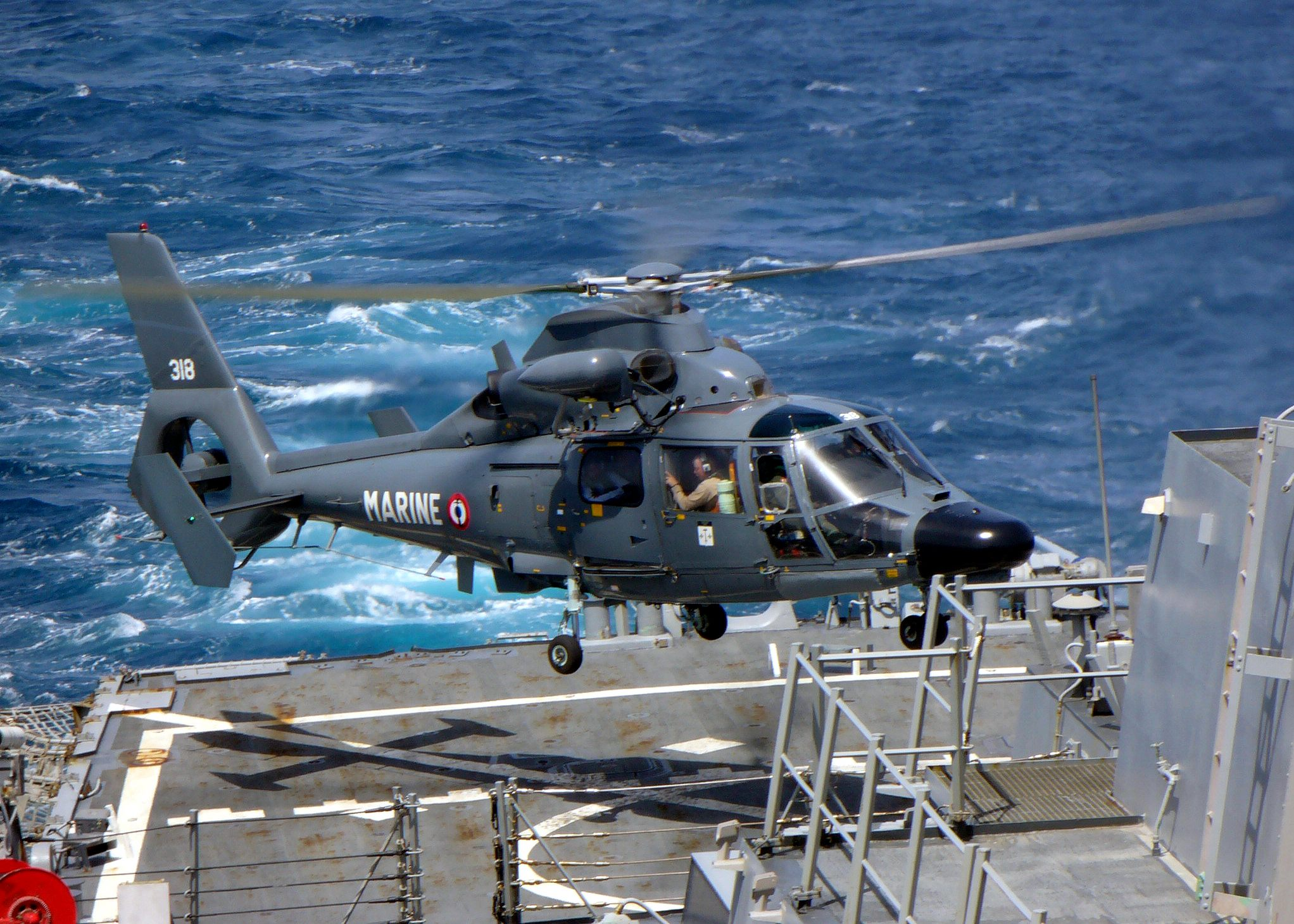
French Navy SA 365 F

AS365 N3 Dauphin
The high-performance AS365 N3 was developed for operations in 'hot and high' climates, and introduced 635 kW (852 shp) Arriel 2C turbo-shafts equipped with a single channel DECU (Digital Engine Control Unit) with manual reversion, mated to an upgraded main transmission for better single engine performance. The AS365 N3 also features a redesigned ten blade composite Fenestron anti-torque device with asymmetric blade distribution, offering a further reduction in noise signature. The AS365 N3's gross weight is 4,300 kg (9,500 lb). Production deliveries began in December 1998.

AS365 N3+
This version was presented by Eurocopter at the 2009 Paris Air Show and differs mainly in new avionics including a 4-axis auto-pilot.

== Operators ==
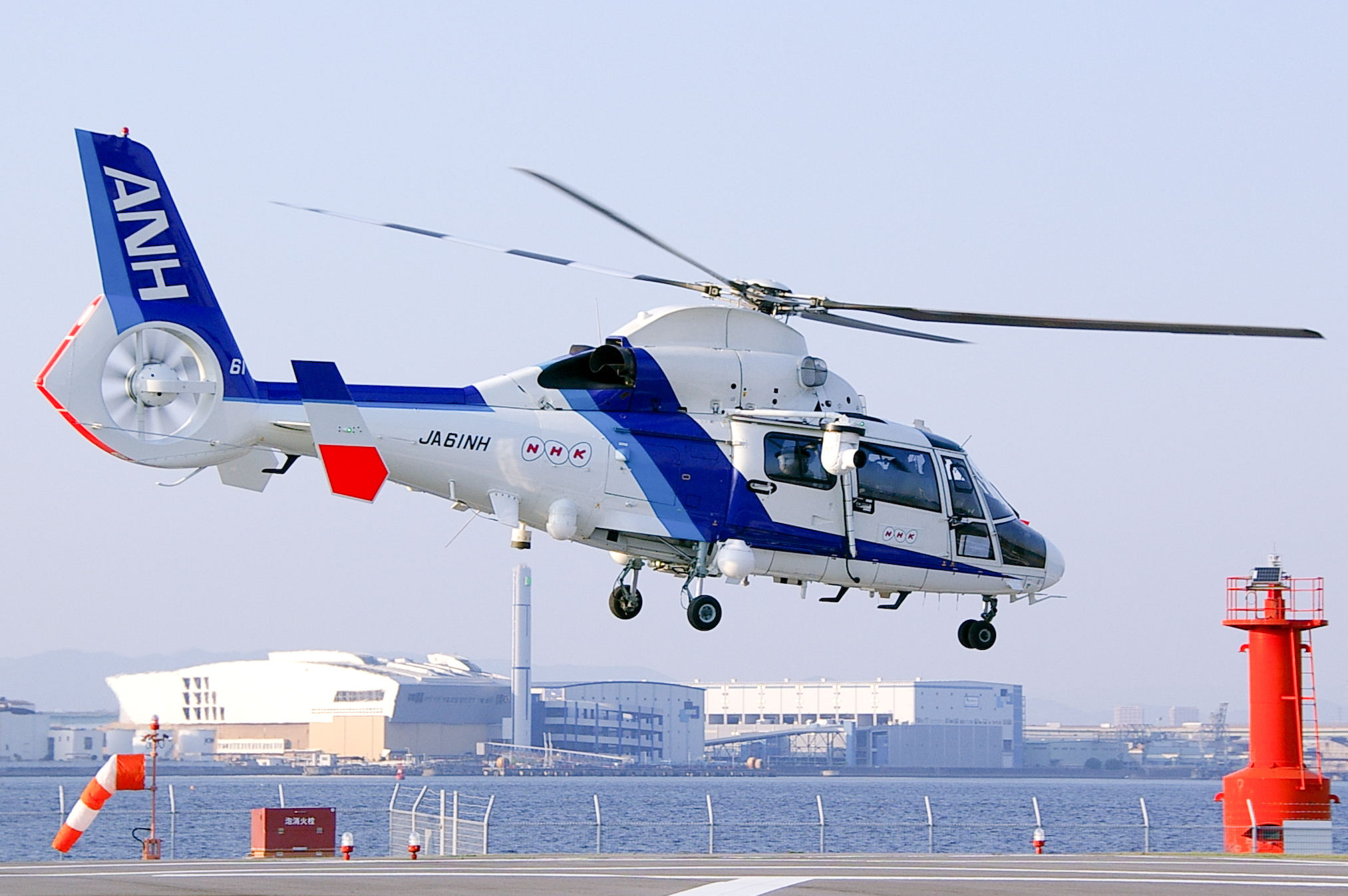
All Nippon Helicopter AS365 N2

The Dauphin is flown by a range of private operators, companies, emergency services, government agencies and air charter companies.

=== Government operators ===
Argentina

- Argentine Coast Guard

Australia

- Victoria Police
- Western Australia Police

France

- Sécurité Civile

Greece

- Hellenic Coast Guard

Iceland

- Icelandic Coast Guard

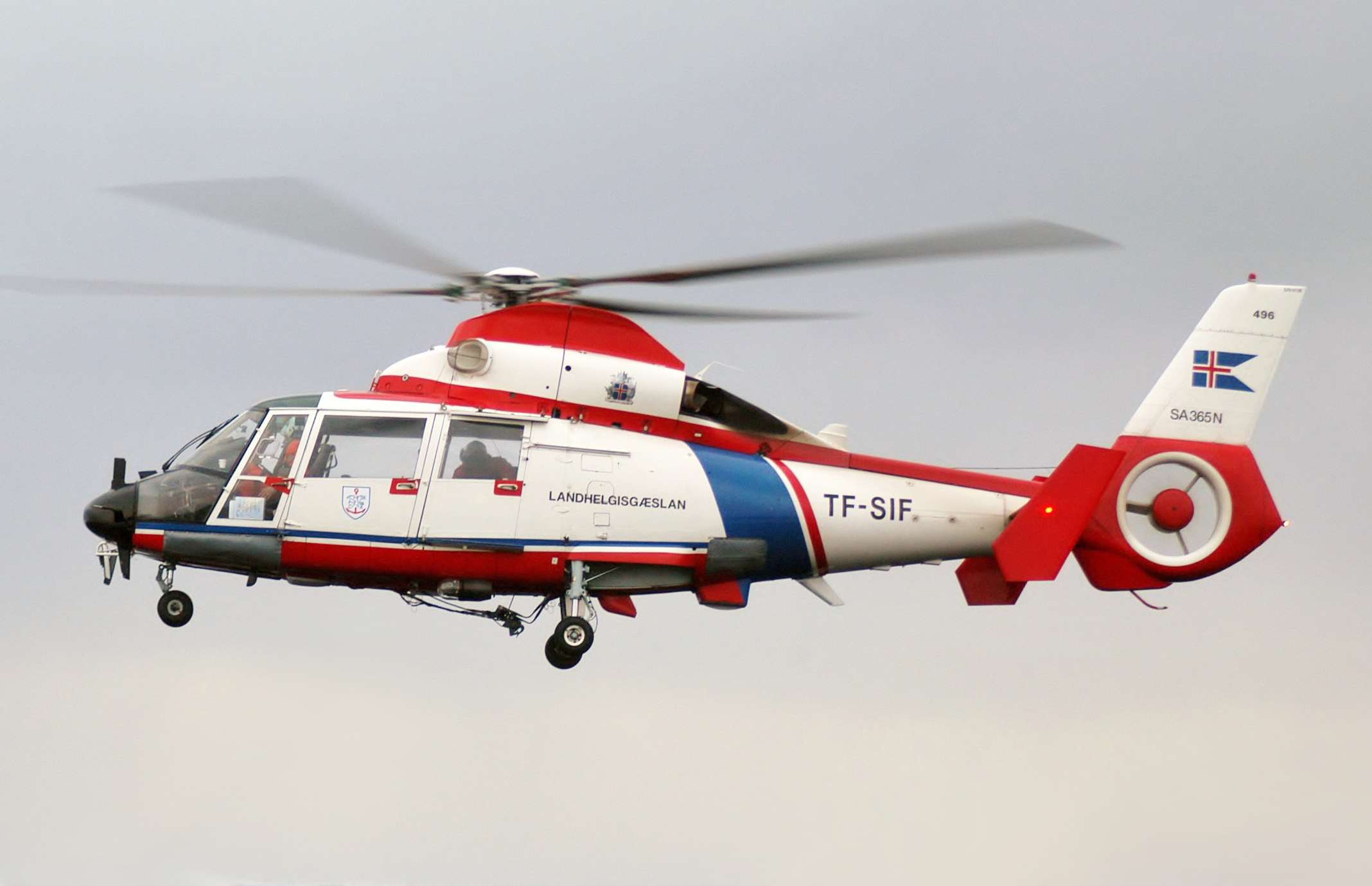
AS365 N2 Dauphin 2, TF-SIF, of the Icelandic Coast Guard

Indonesia

- Indonesian National Police
- National Search and Rescue Agency
- National Agency for Disaster Countermeasure

Japan

- Tokyo Fire Department
- Tokyo Metropolitan Police Department

Kuwait

- Kuwait Police

Malaysia

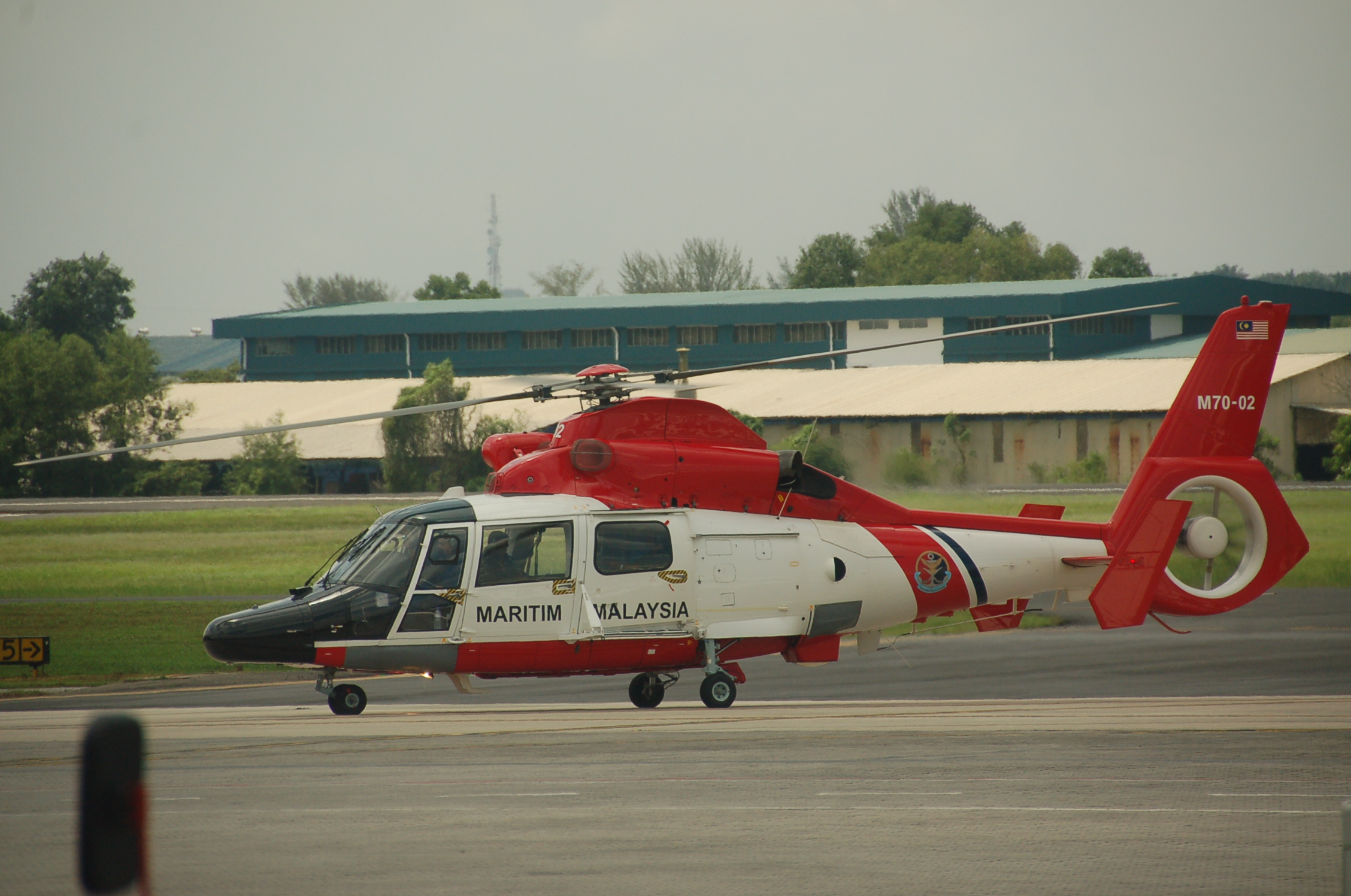
M70-02 of the Malaysian Coast Guard

- Malaysian Maritime Enforcement Agency

Netherlands

- Netherlands Coastguard

Spain

- Guardia Civil
- Servicio de Vigilancia Aduanera

Sweden

- Akademiska sjukhuset

Taiwan

- National Airborne Service Corps

=== Military operators ===
Angola

- FAPA/DAA

Bangladesh

- Bangladesh Army

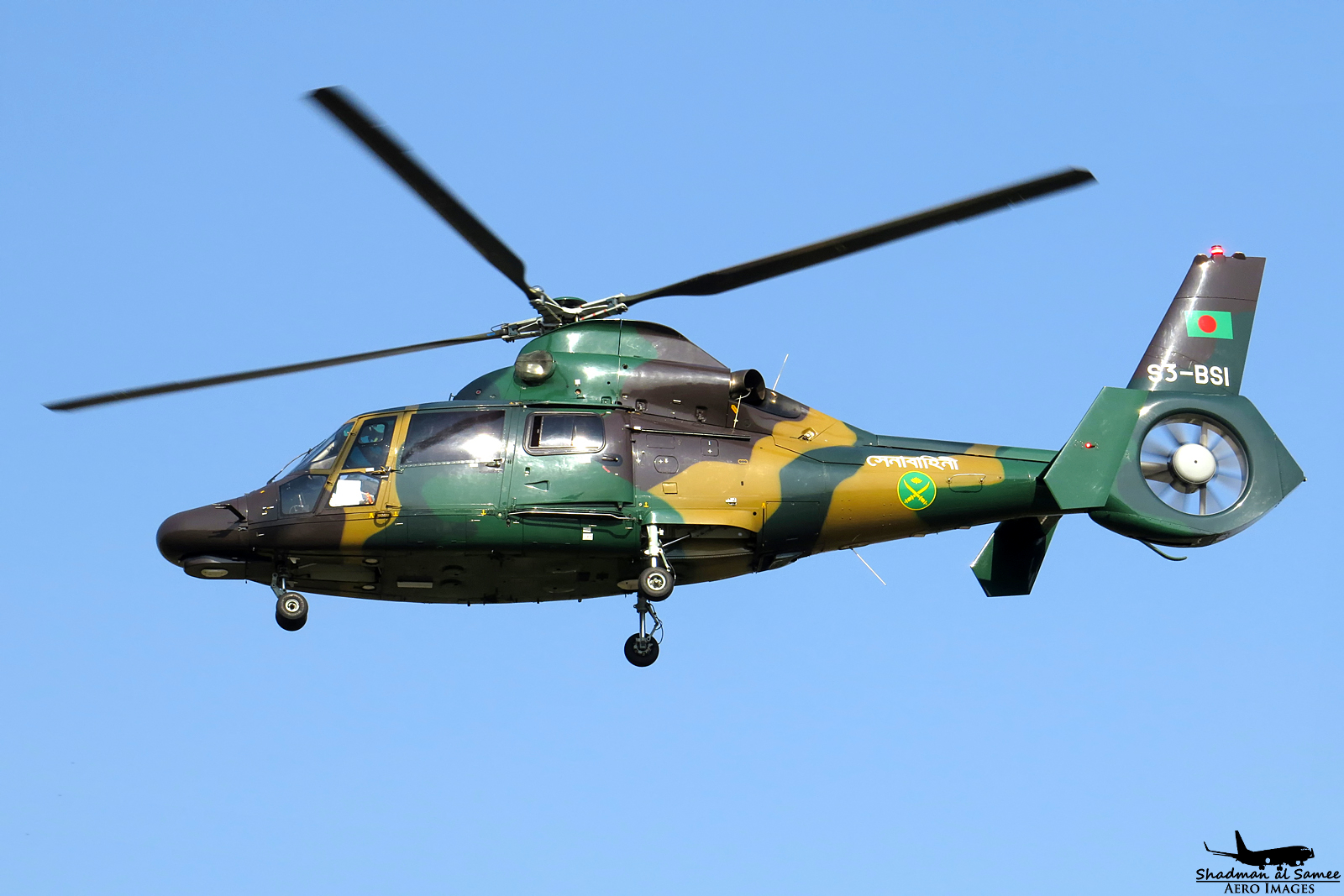
Bangladesh Army Eurocopter AS365 N3+ Dauphin

Bulgaria

- Bulgarian Navy

Chile

- Chilean Navy

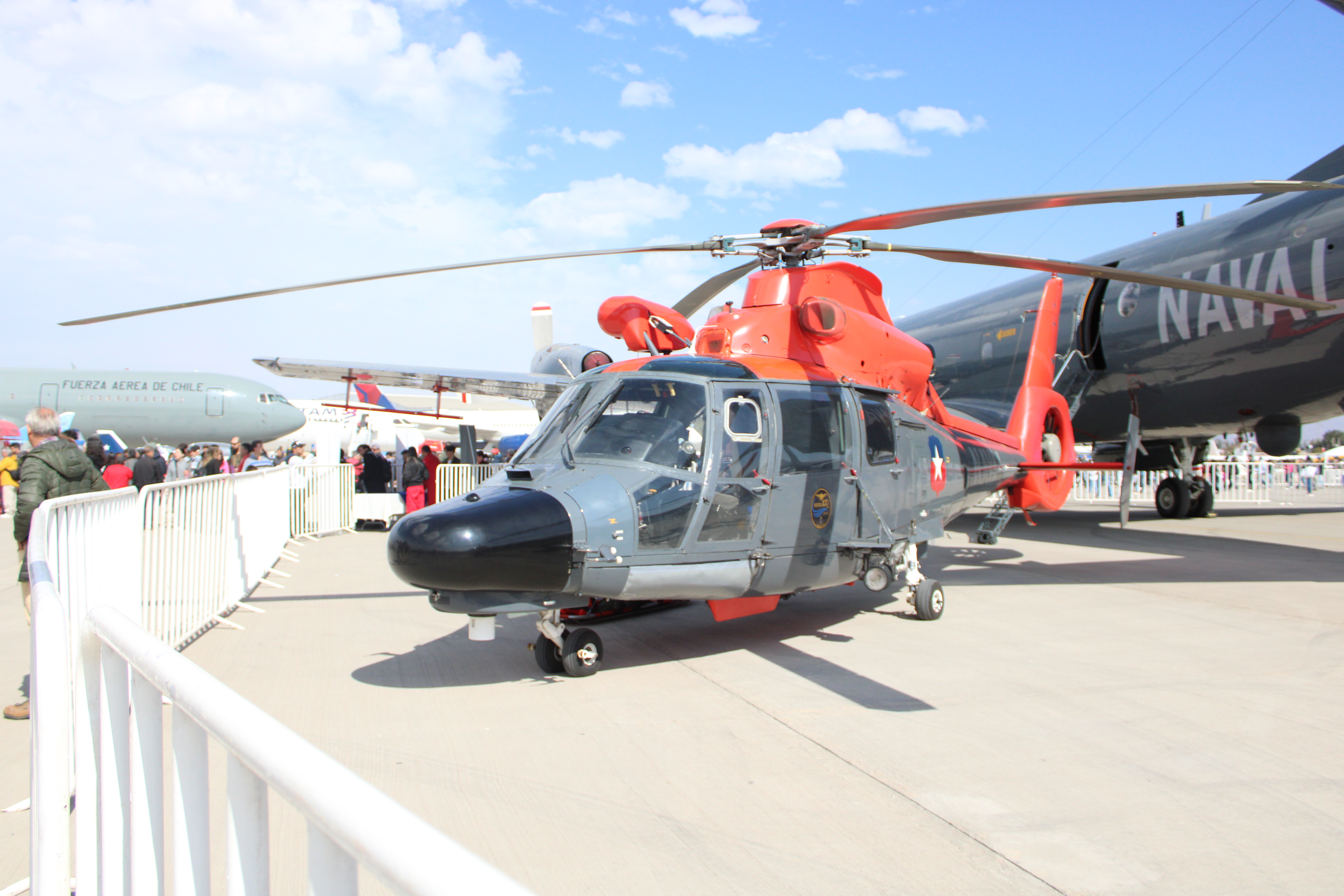
A Chilean Navy SA365F

Colombia

- Colombian Navy

Republic of the Congo

- Congolese Air Force

Djibouti

- Djibouti Air Force

France

- French Navy

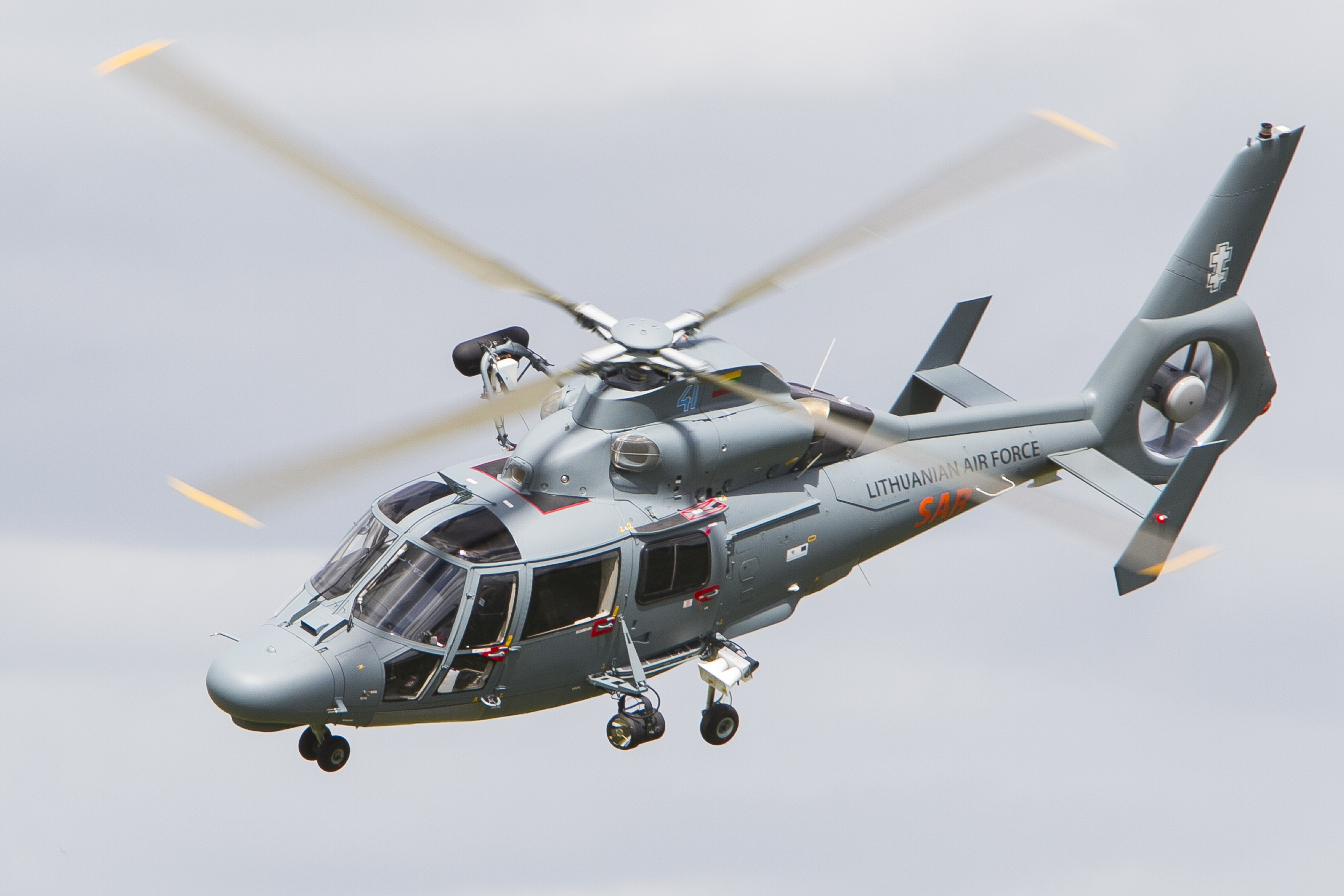
Lithuanian Air Force Eurocopter AS365+ Dauphin

Ivory Coast

- Force Aérienne de Côte d'Ivoire

Lithuania

- Lithuanian Air Force

Myanmar

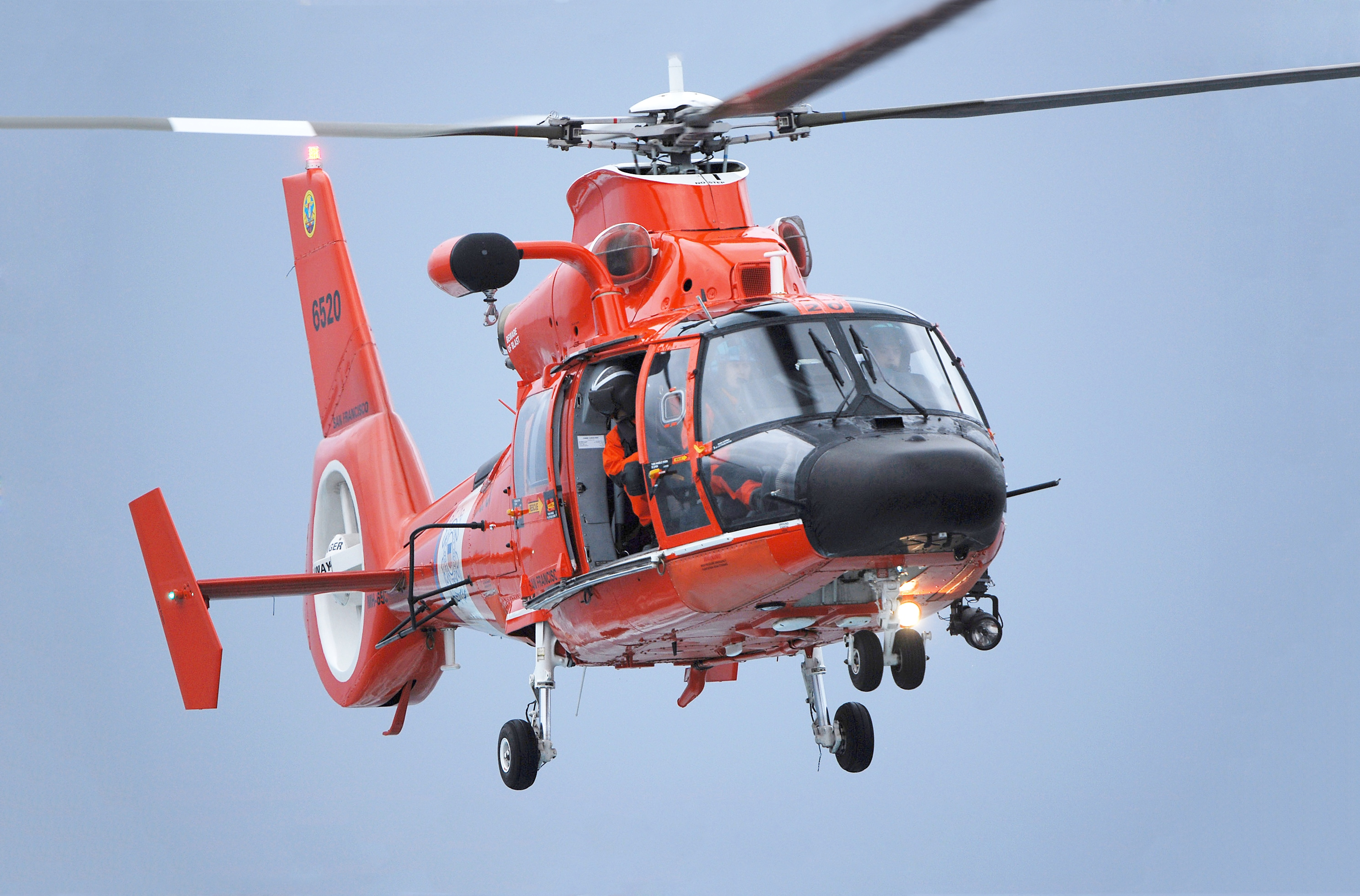
US Coast Guard HH-65 Dolphin

- Myanmar Air Force

Nigeria

- Nigerian Air Force

Saudi Arabia

- Royal Saudi Naval Forces

United Kingdom

- Army Air Corps

Uruguay

- Uruguayan Air Force

=== Former operators ===
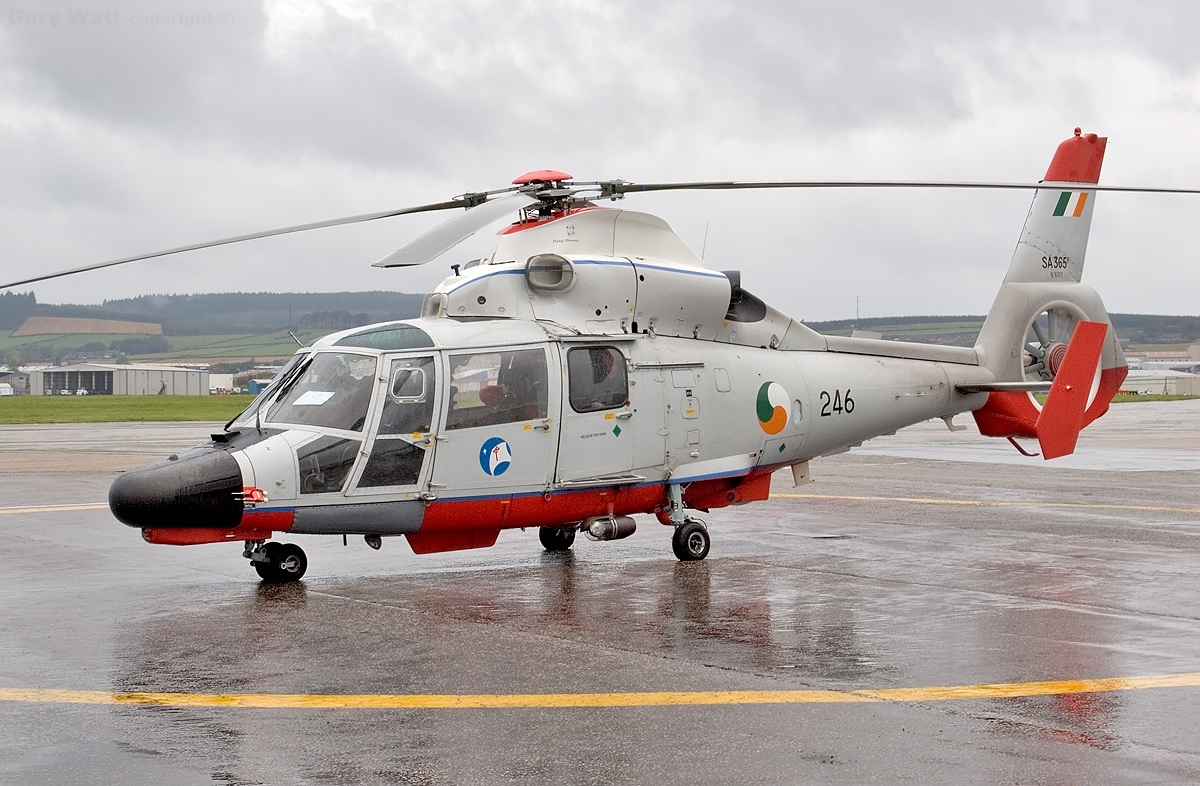
A 365F Dauphin 2 of the Irish Air Corps, which were retired in 2006

Ireland

- Irish Air Corps

South Africa

- South African Air Force

Sri Lanka

- Sri Lanka Air Force

United States

- Maryland State Police

== Aircraft on display ==
- SA365N Dauphin, F-WQAP, at The Helicopter Museum, Weston-super-Mare, United Kingdom.
- SA365C1 Dauphin 2, VH-PVF at Moorabbin Air Museum (Victoria, Australia).

== Accidents and notable incidents ==
On 2 July 1999, an AS365F operated by the Irish Air Corps hit a sand dune in thick fog in Tramore while returning from a successful mission off the Waterford coast. The four crew members were killed in the collision.

On the evening of 2 September 2008, Trooper 2, an AS365N1 operated by the Maryland State Police on a medical evacuation mission, crashed in Walker Mill Regional Park near Walker Mill, Maryland. Four of the five people aboard were killed, including one of the two patients. The National Transportation Safety Board determined that the probable cause of the crash was the pilot's attempt to regain visual conditions by performing a rapid descent and failure to arrest the descent at the minimum descent altitude during a non-precision approach.

On 4 April 2015, an AS365 owned by Orion Corridor Sdn Bhd, crashed in Semenyih near Kajang, Malaysia. All six people on board, including the ex-ambassador of Malaysia to the US and Rompin MP, Jamaluddin Jarjis, and others were killed. The helicopter was coming from a wedding party of the Malaysian Prime Minister's daughter.

== Specifications (AS365 N3) ==

External videos
- Official Dauphin AS365 History video
- Recording of Dauphin landing and taxiing
- Cockpit view of engine startup and takeoff

Data from Eurocopter.com

General characteristics

- Crew: 1 or 2 pilots
- Capacity: 11 or 12 passengers
- Length: 13.73 m (45 ft 1 in)
- Height: 4.06 m (13 ft 4 in)
- Empty weight: 2,389 kg (5,267 lb)
- Max takeoff weight: 4,300 kg (9,480 lb)
- Powerplant: 2 × Turboméca Arriel 2C turboshaft, Take-off Power, 625 kW (838 hp) each
- Main rotor diameter: 11.94 m (39 ft 2 in)
- Main rotor area: 111.98 m^{2} (1,205.3 sq ft)

Performance

- Maximum speed: 306 km/h (190 mph, 165 kn)
- Ferry range: 827 km (514 mi, 447 nmi)
- Service ceiling: 5,865 m (19,240 ft)
- Rate of climb: 8.9 m/s (1,750 ft/min)

== See also ==
Related development

- Aérospatiale SA 360 Dauphin
- Airbus Helicopters H160
- Eurocopter AS565 Panther
- Eurocopter EC155
- Eurocopter HH-65 Dolphin
- Harbin Z-9

Aircraft of comparable role, configuration, and era

- AgustaWestland AW109
- Bell 222/230/430
- Kamov Ka-60
- Sikorsky S-76

Related lists

- List of rotorcraft
