= TAipers =

South Korean anti-tank guided missile

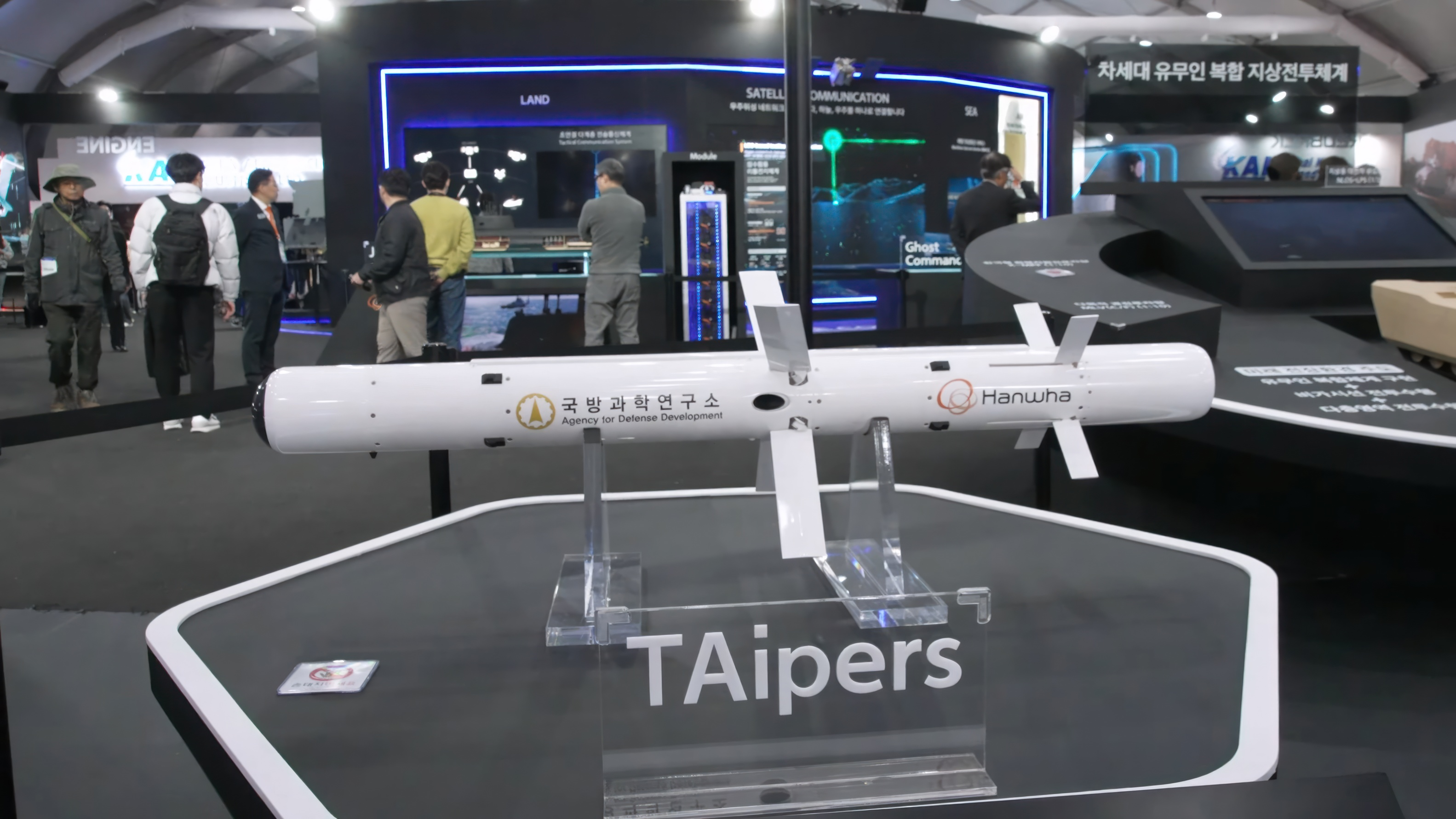
- TAipers missile on display at ADEX 2023
- Type: Anti-tank guided missile
- Place of origin: South Korea

Service history
- In service: 2024–present
- Used by: Republic of Korea Army; Republic of Korea Marine Corps

Production history
- Designer: Agency for Defense Development
- Designed: 2015–2022
- Manufacturer: Hanwha Aerospace
- Produced: 2024–present

Specifications
- Mass: Missile: 35 kilograms (77 lb); Launch pad: 9 kilograms (20 lb)
- Length: Missile: 1,735 millimeters (5 ft 8.3 in); Launch pad: 1,855 millimeters (6 ft 1.0 in)
- Diameter: 150 millimeters (5.9 in)
- Effective firing range: 8 km (5.0 mi)
- Maximum firing range: 10 km (6.2 mi)
- Warhead: Tandem-charge HEAT
- Blast yield: 1,000 mm (39 in) RHA
- Propellant: Smokeless solid-propellant
- Maximum speed: 200 m/s (720 km/h; 450 mph; Mach 0.59)
- Guidance system: Fire-and-forget dual-mode seeker with fiber-optic datalink MITL
- Launch platform: LAH-1 Miron; MAH Marineon

The TAipers (lit. 'Tank Snipers'), or Cheongeom (Korean: 천검, lit. 'Heavenly Sword'), is an air-launched anti-tank guided missile (ATGM) developed by the Agency for Defense Development (ADD) and manufactured by Hanwha Aerospace.

== Development ==
The TAipers was developed to replace air-launched TOW missiles in the inventory of the ROK Armed Forces but could be exported. It was presented to potential customers at the Black Sea Defense & Aerospace 2024.

The cost of development is KRW724.8 billion (USD550.5 million).

The TAipers was introduced as the primary armament of the Republic of Korea Army LAH-1 Miron armed helicopter, which began service in December 2024.

== Design ==
The missile has two modes. The fire-and-forget mode autonomously guides the missile using a dual-mode seeker that combines visible and infrared homing imagery.

The Artificial intelligence (AI) algorithm of the missile system was trained with deep learning on more than 800,000 frames of potential targets. The fire-and-update mode allows the operator to guide the missile from the launch vehicle though fiber-optic datalink.

=== Launch platforms ===
- LAH-1 Miron armed helicopter
- MAH Marineon attack helicopter
- ground vehicles

== Specifications ==
- Mass: 35 kg (77 lb)
- Length: 1,735 mm (5.692 ft)
- Diameter: 150 mm (5.9 in)
- Effective range: 8 km (5.0 mi)
- Maximum range: 10 km (6.2 mi)
- Maximum speed: 200 m/s (720 km/h; 450 mph; Mach 0.59)
- Warhead: Tandem-charge HEAT
- Propellant: Smokeless solid-propellant
- Guidance: INS/Fiber-optic datalink MITL (midcourse guidance), IIR/Fire-and-forget (terminal guidance)

== Variants ==
=== TAipers-L ===
Light variant of the TAipers. Intended primarily for ground platforms. Maximum range has been reduced to 5,500 m (3.4 mi).

== Operators ==
A map of operators of the TAipers

=== Current operators ===
South Korea

- Republic of Korea Army
- Republic of Korea Navy
  - Republic of Korea Marine Corps

== See also ==
- Spike ER – (Israel)
