= Eurocopter EC155 =

Passenger transport helicopter

EC155 H155
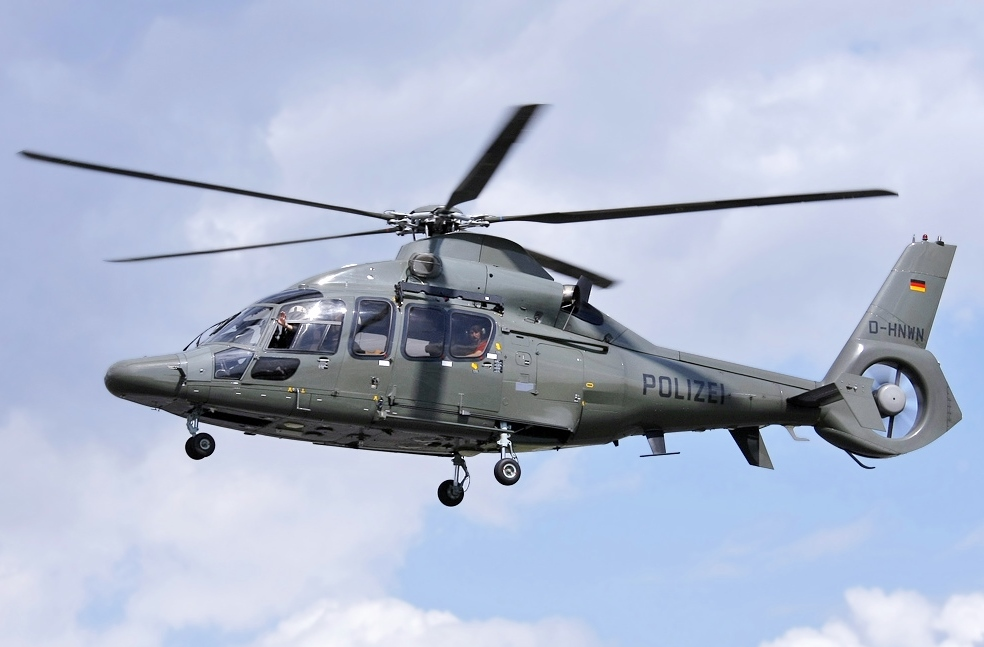
- An Airbus Helicopters H155 with NRW Police (Germany)

General information
- Type: Passenger transport helicopter
- National origin: Multinational
- Manufacturer: Eurocopter; Airbus Helicopters
- Status: Active

History
- Manufactured: 1997–present
- Introduction date: March 1999
- First flight: 17 June 1997
- Developed from: Eurocopter AS365 Dauphin
- Variant: KAI LCH
- Developed into: Eurocopter X³; KAI LAH-1 Miron

The Airbus Helicopters H155 (formerly Eurocopter EC155) is a long-range medium-lift passenger transport helicopter developed by Eurocopter from its Dauphin family for civil aviation use. It is a twin-engined aircraft and can carry up to 13 passengers along with 1 or 2 crew, depending on customer configuration. The helicopter is marketed for passenger transport, offshore support, VIP corporate transport and casualty transport duties. In 2015, the EC155 was formally renamed to the H155, in line with Eurocopter's corporate rebranding as Airbus Helicopters. It was succeeded in the product line by the Airbus Helicopters H160.

== Development ==
Originally designated AS365 N4, the EC155 was developed from the Eurocopter AS365 N3 Dauphin 2 with the aim of significantly increasing the cabin space of the Dauphin. Development began in September 1996 with the helicopter officially announced by Eurocopter at the Paris Air Show in June 1997. The first EC155 helicopter, a modified Dauphin airframe, made its maiden flight at Marignane on 17 June 1997 and the first pre-production EC155 B flew on 11 March 1998. The aircraft received safety certification by the French and German civil aviation authorities on 11 December 1998 and went into production soon after.

In March 1999, deliveries of the EC155 B commenced, the German Federal Police became the first operator of the type. Between March 1999 and June 2003, roughly 50 EC155 Dauphins were sold, mainly to VIP and off-shore customers.

The EC155 B1 was developed with uprated engines, giving it improved performance at high altitude and in hot temperature conditions; this derivative also features a higher maximum take-off weight (10,846 lb vs. 10,580 lb). Deliveries of this model began in November 2002 with the Hong Kong Government Flying Service becoming the first operator. In early 2003, Eurocopter completed studies for an even more powerful version of the EC155 B1, designed to better compete with new rotorcraft such as the AgustaWestland AW139 and to better meet military customer's requirements.

Several major elements of the EC155, such its rotor system (albeit modified to operate at slower rotational speeds), were used in the Eurocopter X3, an experimental high-speed compound helicopter which set an unofficial speed record of 255 knots (293 mph; 472 km/h) in 2013. In 2015, an EC155 was also used by Airbus Helicopters as a flying testbed for new aerodynamic features, such as the rotor blades, biplane stabilizer and canted fenestron, for the developing Airbus Helicopters H160 helicopter.

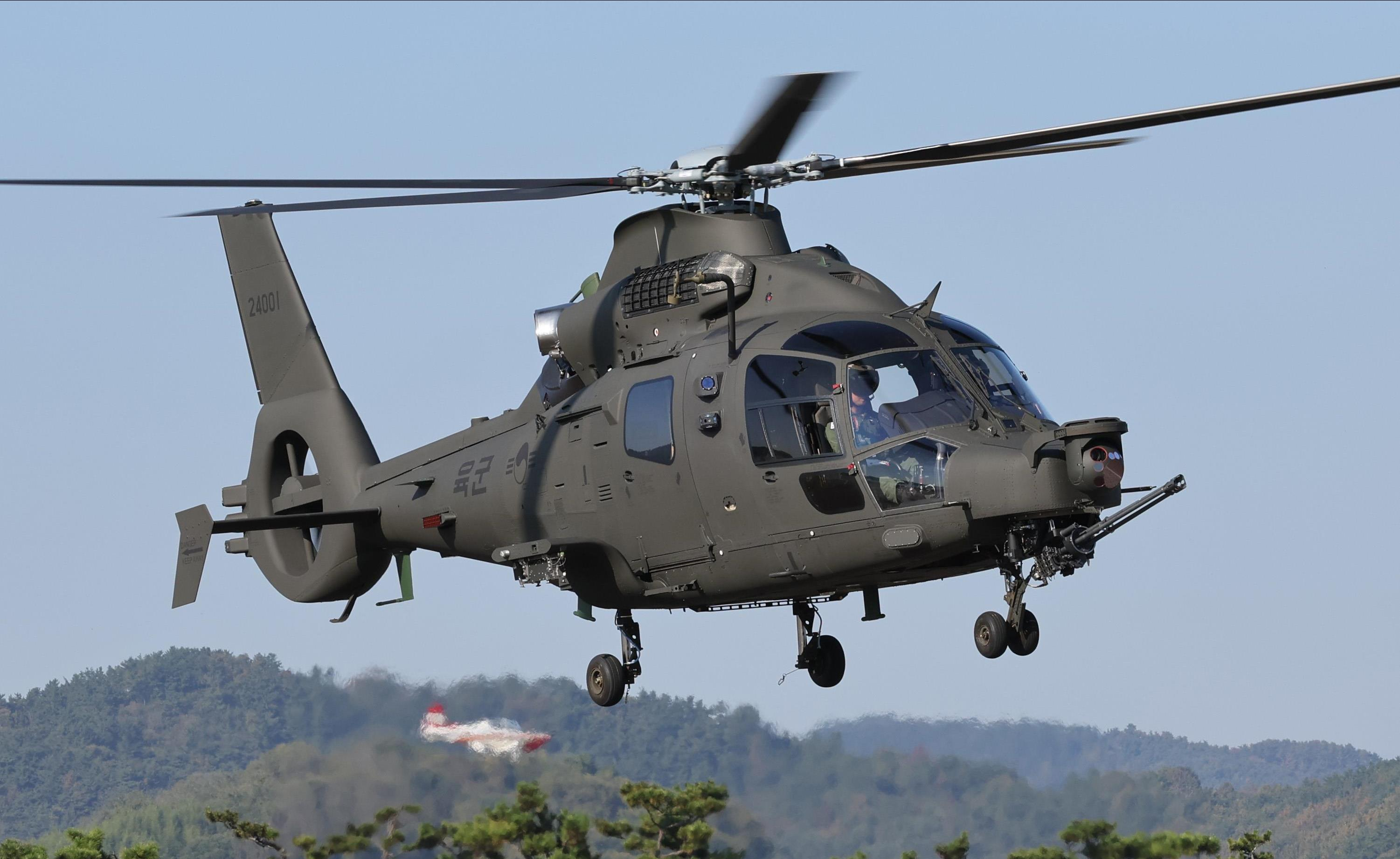
KAI LAH-1 Miron armed helicopter

In 2015, Airbus Helicopters and Korean Aerospace Industries (KAI) formed an agreement to transfer principle manufacturing activity for the EC155 to South Korea; KAI shall become the sole manufacturer of the type after 2018, and both firms shall be jointly involved in the international marketing and further development of the type. The EC155 is to serve as the basis for KAI's Light Civil Helicopter (LCH) and Light Armed Helicopter (LAH), featuring numerous changes including a new cockpit, improved gearbox and rotor blades; the LAH shall have a chin-mounted 20 mm cannon and side-mounted guided rockets, countermeasures systems, and be able to carry 6–10 combat troops. The LCH is to enter service in 2020, and the LAH will follow in 2022 to replace the MD 500 Defender and AH-1J/S Cobra. Airbus foresees a South Korean demand for 100 LCHs and 214 LAHs, and estimates an international market of 300–400 LAH versions to replace legacy attack helicopters.

== Design ==
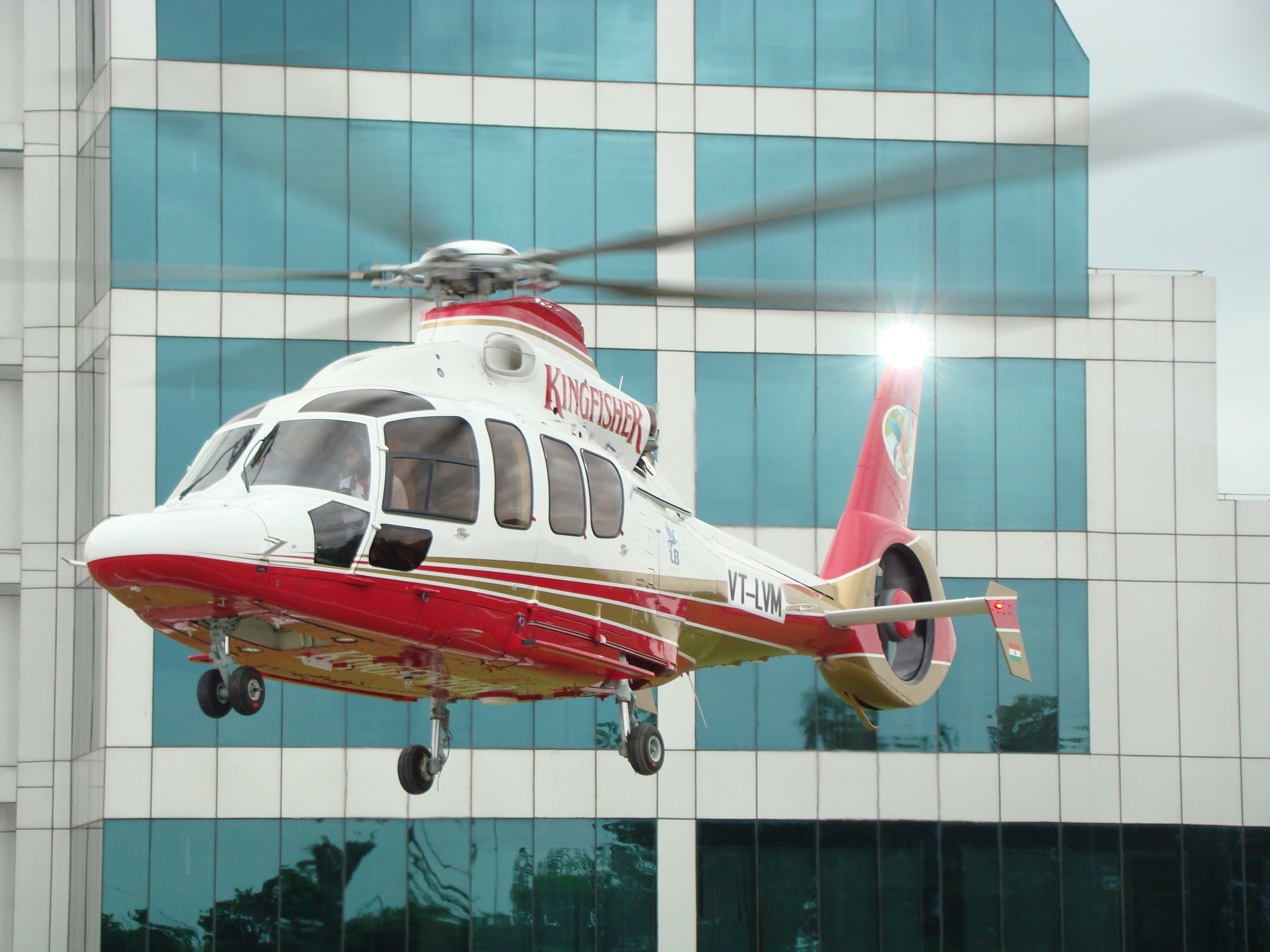
EC155 B1 of Kingfisher Airlines in India

The EC155 B features a completely redesigned cabin providing 30% more passenger space than previous Dauphin helicopter models, plus a 130% increase in baggage hold volume. Other major improvements include a five-blade Spheriflex composite main rotor combined with the familiar shrouded Fenestron tail rotor to reduce vibration levels significantly. The EC155 B is powered by two 635 kW (851 shp) Turbomeca Arriel 2C1 turboshaft engines which feature a dual-channel Full Authority Digital Engine Control (FADEC) system. The EC155 B1 features uprated 697 kW (935 shp) Arriel 2C2s. The helicopter can be fitted with an anti-icing system to enable the aircraft to operate in very cold climates. The all-glass cockpit is equipped with an 'Avionique Nouvelle' integrated digital flight control system featuring Eurocopter's Vehicle and Engine Management Display (VEMD), which utilizes active matrix liquid crystal displays. The EC155 is also equipped with a four-axis digital autopilot, coupled to the engine FADECs for full-envelope protection, and is offered with a Health and Usage Monitoring System (HUMS).

Eurocopter designed the EC155 originally with three configurations, however, another two configurations were added in 2005. The Passenger Transport version can carry 12 passengers in comfort seats or 13 passengers in utility seats, along with 1 or 2 crew. The VIP or Corporate Transport version has a VIP lounge with working space accommodating up to 8 executives. The Casualty Transport version can carry 2 stretchered patients with up to 4 seated medical staff, or 4 patients on stretchers plus 2 seated medical staff. The configurations added in 2005 were for offshore operation and police and parapublic missions ranging from patrol, airborne surveillance, SAR and EMS, the helicopter being fitted with specific mission equipment for these duties.

== Variants ==
- EC155 – The first prototype, built from modifying an existing Dauphin airframe.
- EC155 B – The first production version, powered by two Turbomeca Arriel 2C1 turboshaft engines.
- EC155 B1 – An uprated model equipped with two Turbomeca Arriel 2C2 turboshaft engines and higher M.T.O.W., offering enhanced hot and high performance
- AS565 UC – Designation of early military derivative study
- LCH/LAH – Improved type development by Korea Aerospace Industries. The LCH will enter service in 2020, and the LAH in 2022.

== Operators ==
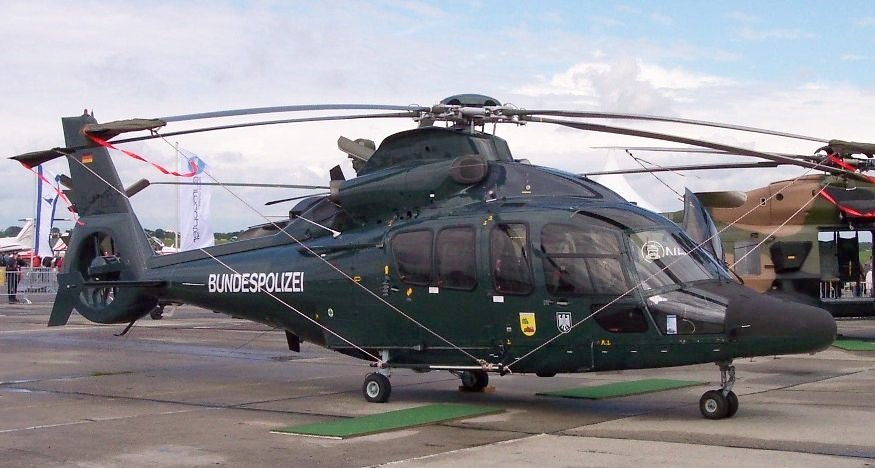
An EC155 of the German Bundespolizei

The aircraft is operated by private individuals, companies and charter operators. It is also operated by government organisations and as an offshore transport for the gas and oil industry.

China

- Shanghai Municipal Public Security Bureau

Dominican Republic

- Dominican Republic Air Force

Germany

- Bundespolizei
- NRW Police

Greenland

- Air Greenland

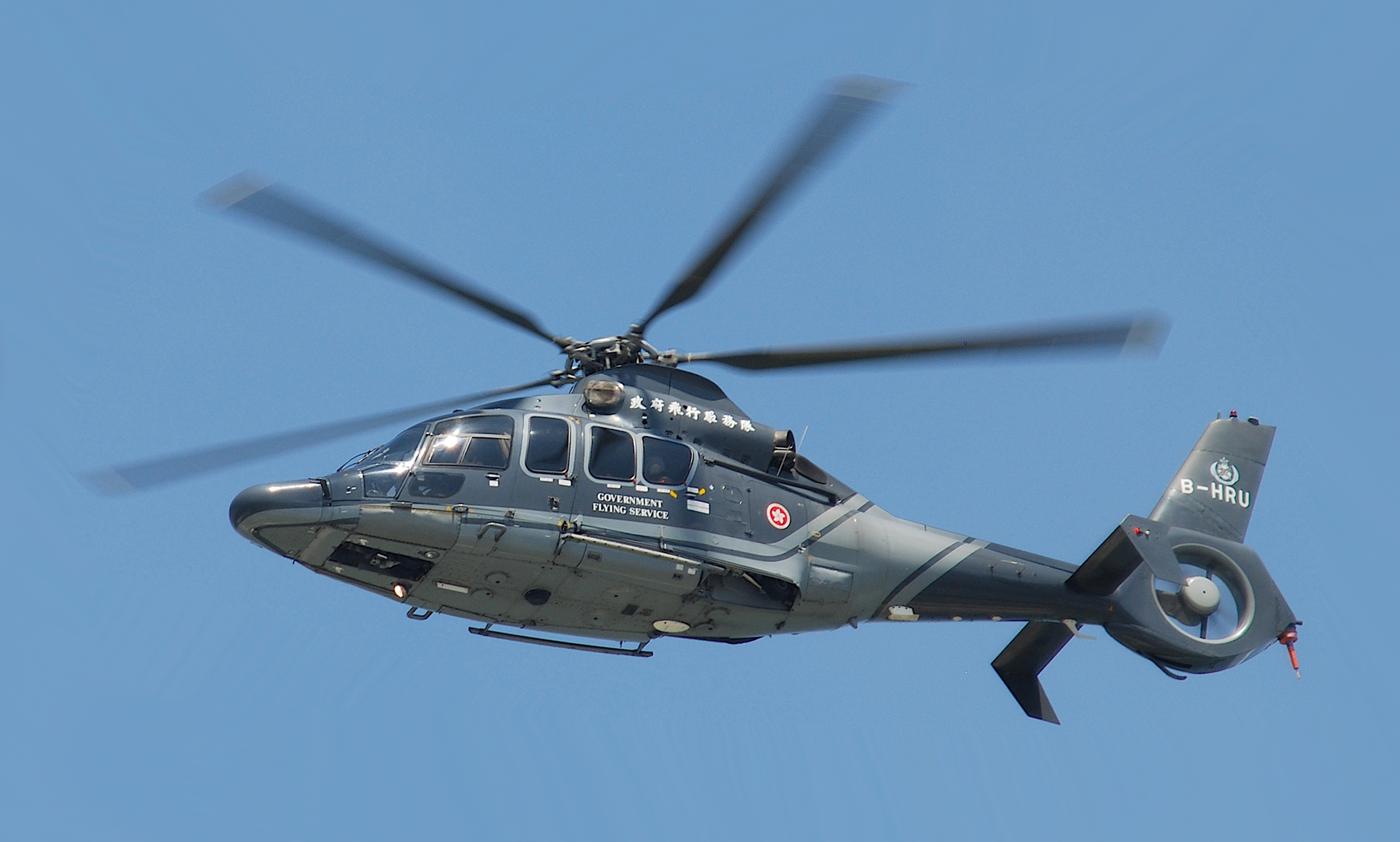
An EC155, operated by the Hong Kong Government Flying Service

Hong Kong

- Government Flying Service

Thailand

- Royal Thai Police

United States

- University of Michigan Survival Flight
- University of Florida ShandsCair

Vietnam

- Vietnam Helicopter Corporation

== Specifications (EC155 B1) ==

Data from {Eurocopter.com}

General characteristics

- Crew: 1 or 2 (pilots)
- Capacity: 13 passengers or 2,301 kg (5,073 lb) payload
- Length: 14.3 m (46 ft 11 in)
- Height: 4.35 m (14 ft 3 in)
- Empty weight: 2,618 kg (5,772 lb)
- Gross weight: 4,950 kg (10,913 lb)
- Max takeoff weight: 4,920 kg (10,847 lb)
- Powerplant: 2 × Turbomeca Arriel 2C2 turboshaft engines, Take-off Power, 697 kW (935 hp) each
- Main rotor diameter: 12.6 m (41 ft 4 in)
- Main rotor area: 124.7 m^{2} (1,342 sq ft)

Performance

- Never exceed speed: 324 km/h (201 mph, 175 kn)
- Range: 857 km (533 mi, 463 nmi)
- Ferry range: 985 km (612 mi, 532 nmi)
- Service ceiling: 4,572 m (15,000 ft)
- Rate of climb: 8.9 m/s (1,750 ft/min)

== See also ==
Related development

- Aérospatiale SA 360 Dauphin
- Eurocopter AS365 Dauphin
- Eurocopter HH-65 Dolphin
- Eurocopter AS565 Panther
- Eurocopter X3
- KAI LAH-1 Miron
- KAI LCH

Aircraft of comparable role, configuration, and era

- Harbin Z-9
- Kamov Ka-60
- AgustaWestland AW139
- Bell 430
- Sikorsky S-76
- TAI T625
- HAL Dhruv
- HAL Rudra

Related lists

- List of rotorcraft
