= Turbomeca Arriel =

French turboshaft engine

Arriel
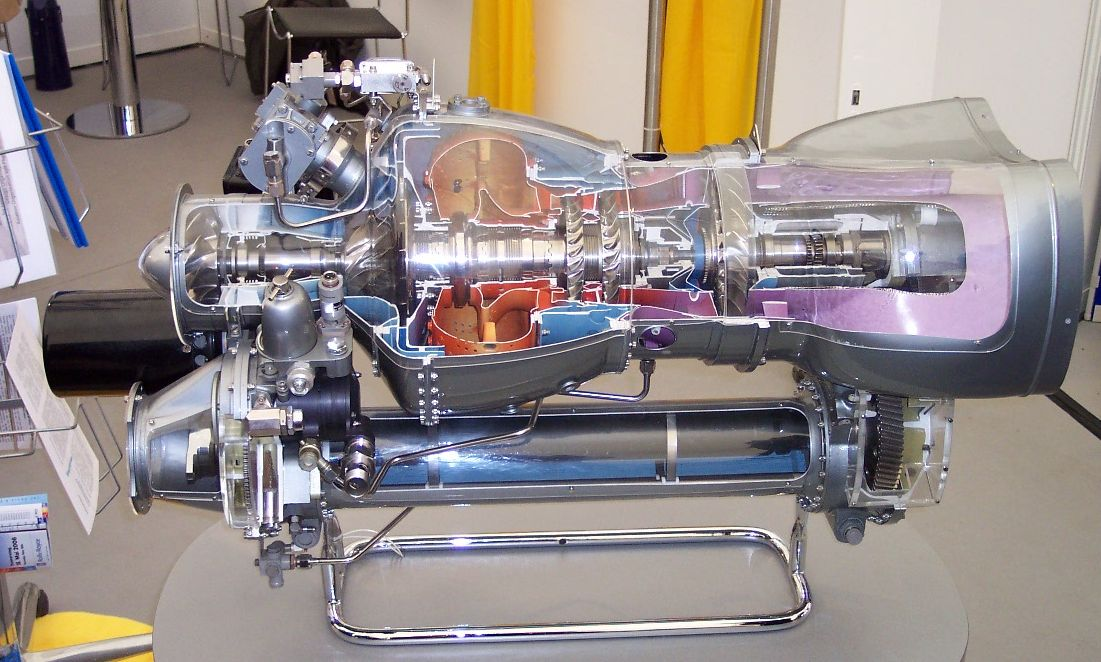
- Cutaway of a Turbomeca Arriel
- Type: Turboshaft
- National origin: France
- Manufacturer: Turbomeca; Safran Helicopter Engines
- First run: 1974
- Major applications: Agusta A109; Eurocopter MH-65 Dolphin; Sikorsky S-76; Harbin Z-9; Harbin Z-19
- Number built: 10,000

The Turbomeca Arriel is a series of French turboshaft engines that first ran in 1974. Delivering 650 to 1,000 hp (480 to 750 kW), over 12,000 Arriel engines have been produced from 1978 to 2018, logging more than 50 million flight hours for 40 helicopter applications. In June 2018, 1,000 Arriel 2D were in service, powering H125 and H130 single-engine helicopters, having logged one million flight hours since 2011. After endurance tests and fleet data analysis, their TBO increased by 25% to 5,000 hours and mandatory inspection rose to 15 years with no hourly limit, lowering maintenance costs.

In 2021 Safran opened a production facility in Grand Prairie, Texas for production of Arriel 2E engines, which had previously only been produced in France.

== Applications ==
- AgustaWestland AW109
- Eurocopter AS365 Dauphin
- Eurocopter AS565 Panther
- Eurocopter MH-65 Dolphin
- Eurocopter EC130
- Eurocopter EC145
- Eurocopter EC155
- Eurocopter AS350 Écureuil
- Harbin Z-9
- Harbin Z-19
- Kopter AW09
- MBB/Kawasaki BK 117
- Robinson R88
- Sikorsky S-76

== Specifications (Arriel 2) ==
Data from EASA Type Certificate Data Sheet for Model 2B.

==== General characteristics ====
- Type: Turboshaft engine
- Length: 1.181 m (3 ft 10.5 in)
- Diameter: 0.616 m (2 ft 0.3 in)
- Dry weight: 134 kg (295 lb)

==== Components ====
- Compressor: Single-stage axial plus single-stage centrifugal
- Combustors: Annular combustion chamber
- Turbine: Single-stage power turbine, two-stage gas generator turbine
- Fuel type: Jet A1

==== Performance ====
- Maximum power output: 747 shp (557 kW)
- Overall pressure ratio: 8:1
- Turbine inlet temperature: 915 °C (1,679 °F)
- Power-to-weight ratio: 4.2 kilowatts per kilogram (2.6 hp/lb) approx

== See also ==
Related lists

- List of aircraft engines
