= Airbus Helicopters H160 =

Medium utility helicopter

H160
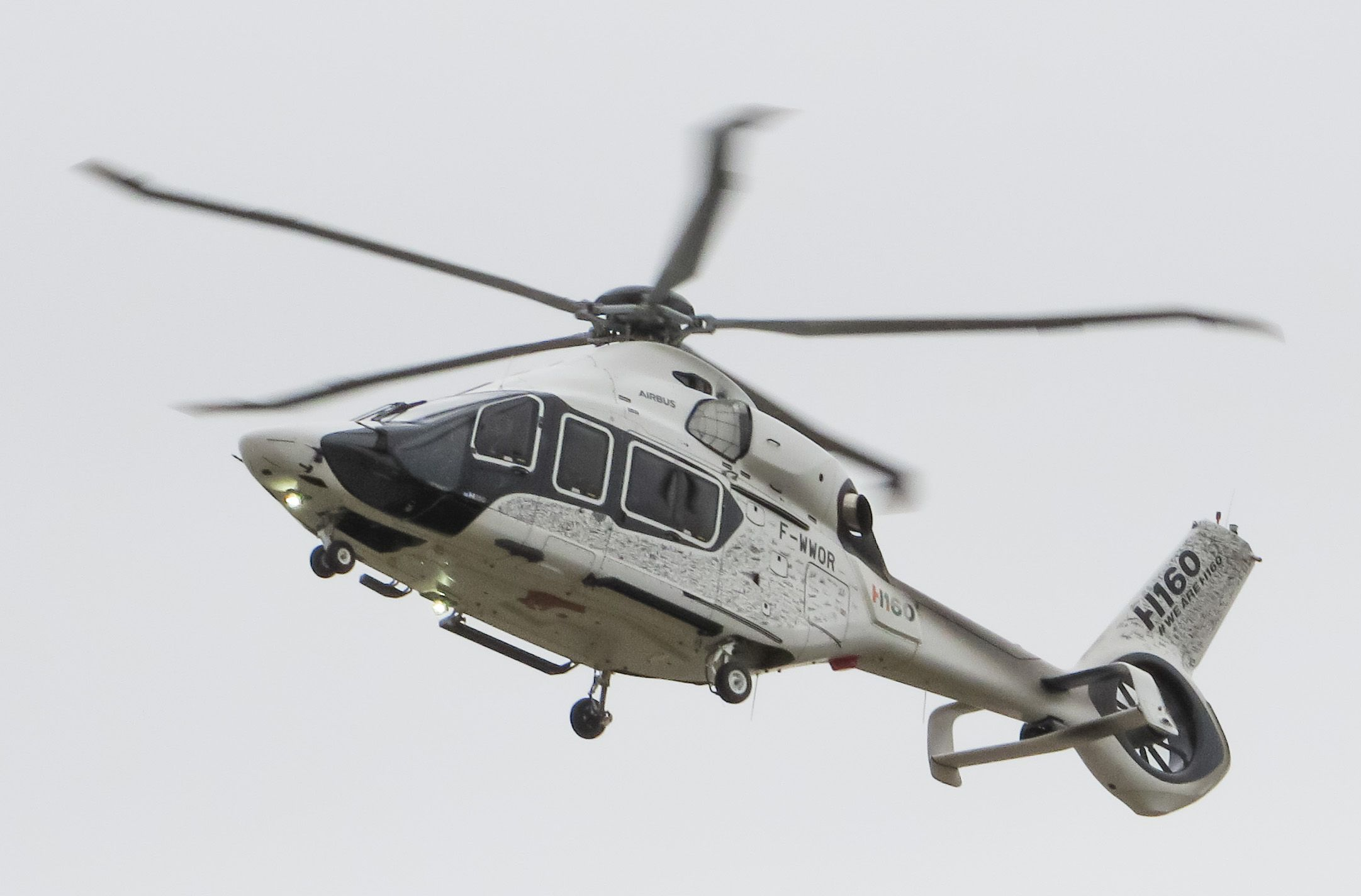
- H160-B civil variant

General information
- Type: Medium utility helicopter
- National origin: Multinational
- Manufacturer: Airbus Helicopters
- Status: In production

History
- Manufactured: 2015–present
- Introduction date: 2021
- First flight: 13 June 2015

The Airbus Helicopters H160 (formerly X4) is a medium utility helicopter developed by Airbus Helicopters. Formally launched at Heli-Expo in Orlando, Florida on 3 March 2015, it is intended to replace the AS365 and EC155 models in the firm's lineup. In June 2015, the first test flight took place. It received its EASA type certification in July 2020, and first deliveries were in December 2021.

== Development ==
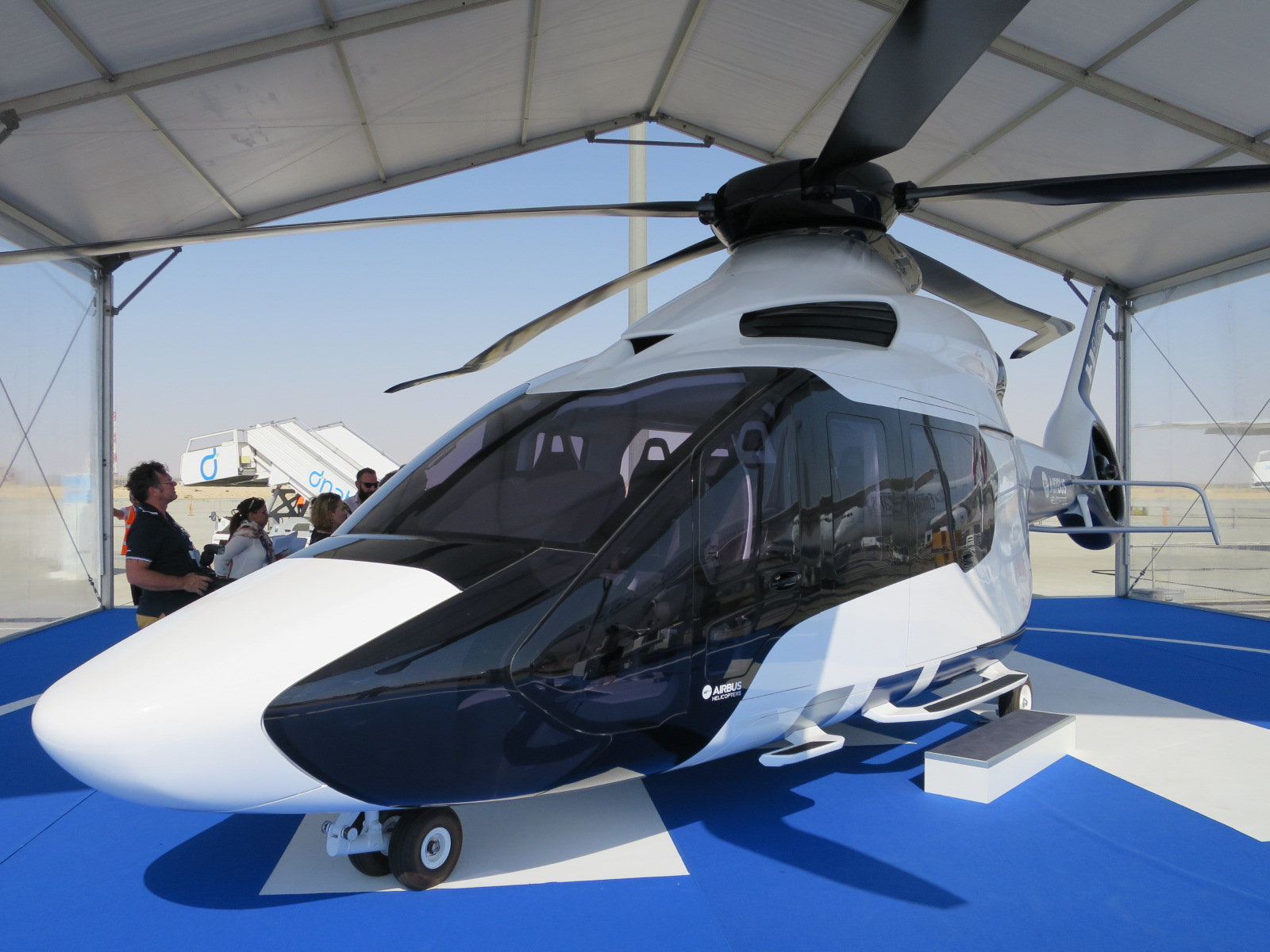
Airbus Helicopters H160 mockup at the 2015 Dubai Airshow.

The Airbus Helicopters H160 was first revealed to the public in 2011, at which point it was referred to by company representatives by the designation X4—a designation which implied it to be a follow-on from the Eurocopter X3, a high-speed hybrid helicopter technology demonstrator. Speaking in early 2011, Eurocopter (later renamed as Airbus Helicopters) chief Lutz Bertling declared that the X4 would be a "game changer", contrasting significance of the innovations it would feature with Airbus' development of fly-by-wire controls. Early features alluded to include Blue Edge active tracking rotor blades, advanced pilot assistance functionality, and reduced vibration to "near-jet" levels of smoothness. The X4 was also described as having a "radically different" cockpit, Bertling stating that "The cockpit as we know it today will not be there". It was also announced that the X4 would be introduced in two stages: an interim model in 2017 with some of the advanced features absent, and a more advanced model following in 2020.

The development program for the X4 cost €1 billion ($1.12 billion). Cutting-edge features, including proposed highly advanced control systems, were toned down or eliminated as too risky or costly. On 3 March 2015, the X4 was formally unveiled under the H160 designation. It has been marketed as a successor to the company's existing Eurocopter AS365 Dauphin and competes with the AgustaWestland AW139, Sikorsky S-76, and Bell 412; Guillaume Faury, Airbus Helicopters Chief Executive, referred to the H160 as being "the AW139 killer". The H160 began Airbus Helicopters' re-branded naming convention; starting 1 January 2016, helicopters in the same range shall bear the 'H' designation, resembling how Airbus names their commercial aircraft.

A design emphasis was placed on using Airbus' production and support techniques as used for advanced fixed-wing aircraft such as the Airbus A350 passenger jet; accordingly, a pair of test rigs were built to separately test the dynamic and system elements respectively to speed up the design process. On 29 May 2015, the first H160 prototype was unveiled at Airbus Helicopters' Marignane facility in France.

=== Flight testing ===
On 13 June 2015, the first prototype performed its first flight from Marignane. By November 2015, the flight envelope of the prototype had been progressively expanded, having attained a maximum altitude of 15,000 feet (4,600 m) and a maximum speed of 175 knots (324 km/h; 201 mph) so far. On 18 December 2015, the second prototype, the first H160 to be equipped with Turbomeca Arrano engines, performed its initial ground run; its maiden flight took place on 27 January 2016.

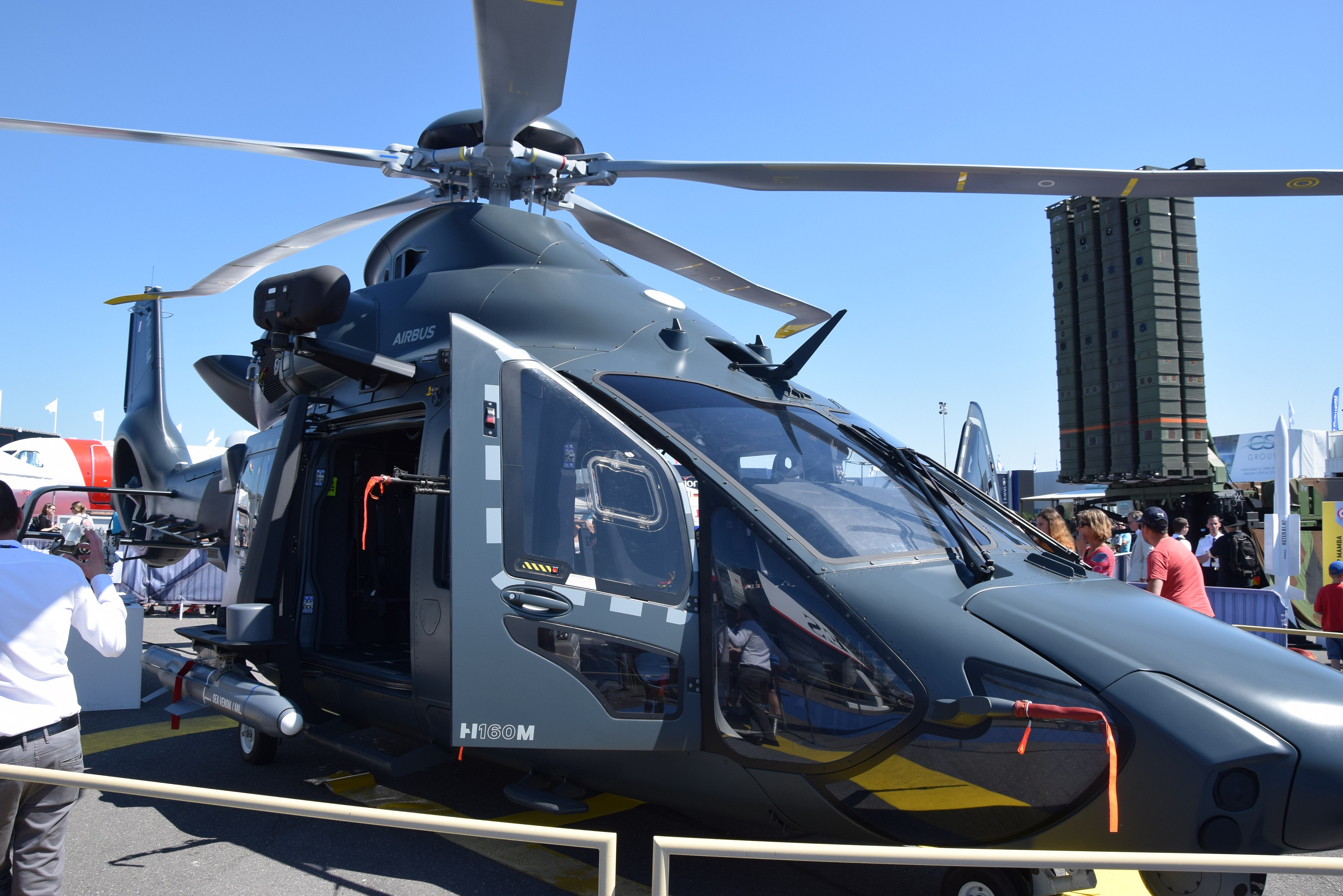
Airbus Helicopters H160M Guépard mock-up at Paris Air Show 2019

In November 2015, it was announced that certification of the H160 and its entry into service with civil operators were both scheduled to take place in 2018; a military-orientated variant, designated H160M, is aimed to enter service in 2022. In March 2016, H160 program chief Bernard Fujarski stated that nearly all milestones set for 2015 had been achieved, save for the second prototype's first flight having been delayed to January 2016, and that the H160's aerodynamic configuration had been validated. Testing had revealed a need to relocate some electronics systems to the rotorcraft's nose from the rear portion of the main fuselage for center of gravity reasons, while the fenestron shrouded tail rotor had reportedly exceeded performance expectations.

In 2015, Airbus estimated that there was a market for 120–150 airframes annually; the company intends to initially increase the manufacturing rate to roughly 50 aircraft per year. In July 2016, it was announced that the aeromechanical configuration of the rotorcraft had been frozen. Manufacturing of the first production H160 is scheduled for 2017; the first delivery may take place in late 2018 or early 2019. A new production scheme, drawing inspiration from the automotive industry, is to be implemented in the H160's construction; it is a stated aim for the final assembly lead time of the new rotorcraft to be half of that of the preceding Dauphin.

In March 2017, French defence minister Jean-Yves Le Drian announced at Marignane that the H160 was selected as the basis for its tri-service light rotorcraft replacement programme, the hélicoptère interarmées léger (HIL), with between 160 and 190 required from 2024 to replace 420 aircraft : French navy's Alouette IIIs, SA 365 Dauphin, and AS565 Panther, the French Air Force's AS555 Fennec and SA330 Pumas; and the French army Pumas, SA341/SA342 Gazelles and Fennec. In May 2019, French Minister of the Armed Forces Florence Parly christened this helicopter as H160M Guépard.

In October 2017, the initial pair of prototypes reached 500h of flight testing while the third should make its maiden flight, the entire flight envelope had been opened leaving hot weather, antennas, optional equipment testing, and certification flights. In 2018, 10 pre-serial helicopters were assembled before certification and deliveries in 2019, production was looking to be increased to 50 per year. The first serial H160 made its maiden flight on 14 December 2018. Its Safran Arrano turboshaft received its type certificate during the June 2019 Paris Air Show, before EASA approval for the H160 planned for the fourth quarter before first delivery to a US customer for corporate transport in May 2020.

After 1500 hours of flight tests and demo flights with three prototypes, the H160 was type certified by the EASA on 1 July 2020, before FAA certification and delivery to a US customer planned for the same year. Japanese certification followed in May 2021 and in Brazil in September, and the first H160 was delivered on 10 December to All Nippon Helicopter for electronic news gathering, starting in 2022.

== Design ==
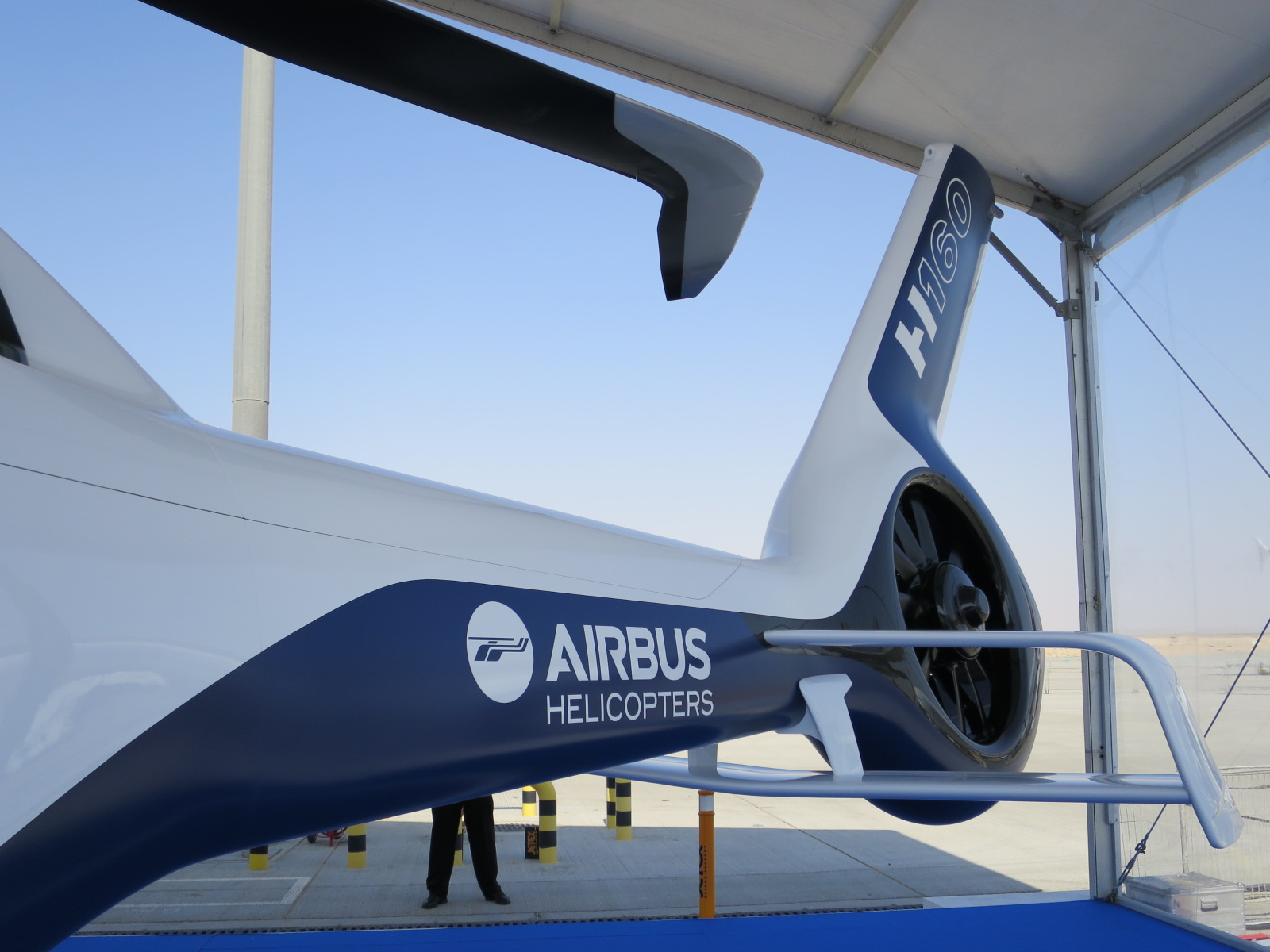
H160 tail showing biplane stabiliser, canted fenestron and rotor tip

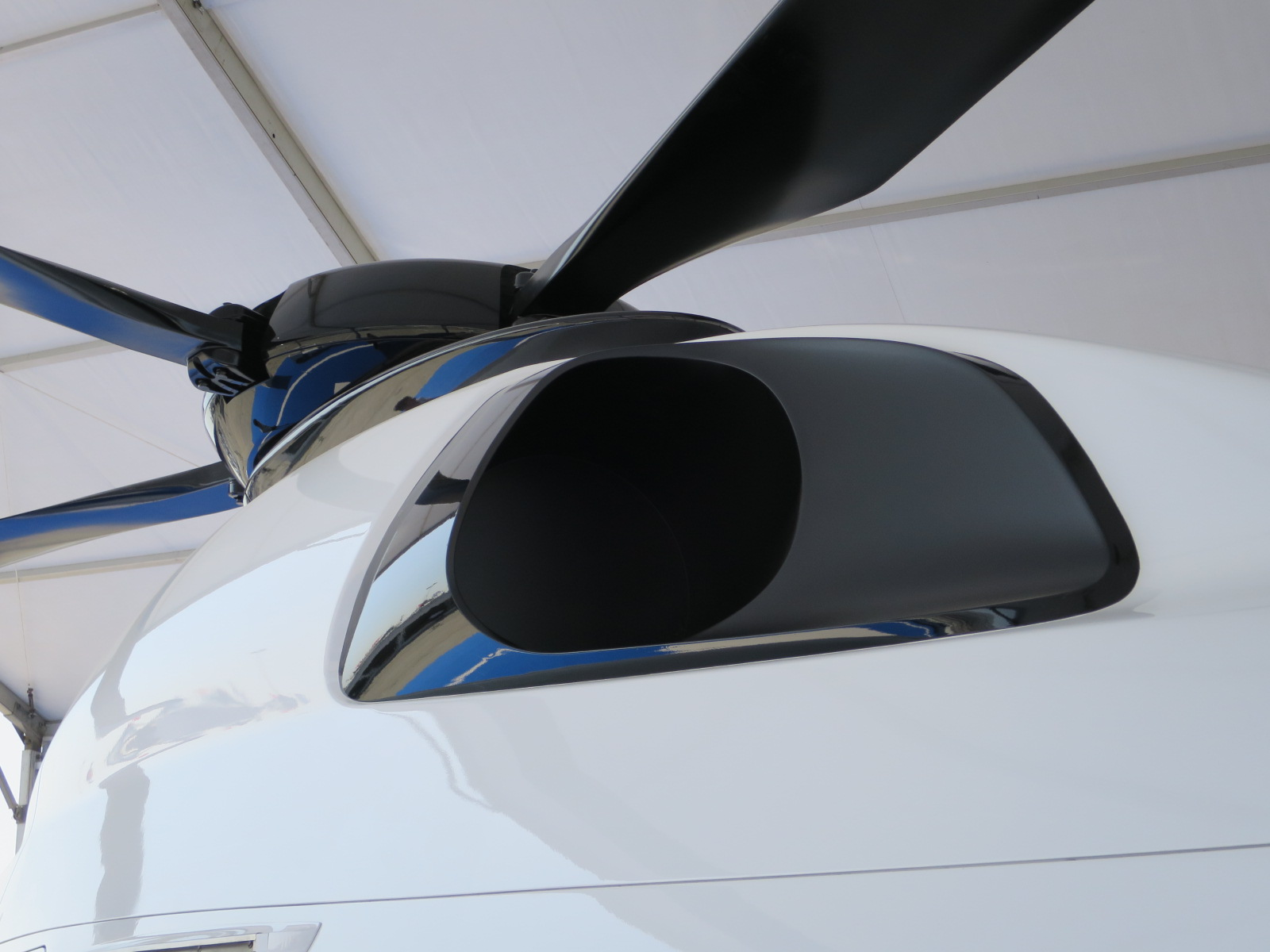
H160 rotor hub and exhaust

The Airbus Helicopters H160 takes advantage of several advanced manufacturing technologies and materials in order to produce a lighter, more efficient design. One weight-saving measure was the replacement of conventional hydraulic landing gear and brakes with electrical counterparts, the first helicopter in the world to do so; according to Airbus the elimination of hydraulic components makes the rotorcraft both lighter and safer. In 2015, Airbus claimed that the all-composite H160 would deliver the same basic performance as the rival AgustaWestland AW139 while being 1 tonne lighter, having a lower fuel consumption and offering 15–20% lower direct operating costs. The composite fuselage also provided for greater design freedom of the rotorcraft's external styling. During the aircraft's development features such as full de-icing equipment and a fly-by-wire control system were deemed too heavy or costly for the benefits they would deliver and were eliminated.

The H160 is the first rotorcraft to feature the Blue Edge main rotor. The main rotor has five blades which incorporate a double-swept shape that reduces the generation of blade–tip vortices. The resulting reduction in blade-vortex interactions, a phenomenon which occurs when the blade impacts a vortex created at its tip, allows for a 3–4 dB noise reduction and raises the effective payload by 100 kg (220 lb) compared with a scaled Eurocopter AS365 Dauphin rotor design. The main rotor is also tilted 4° forward to reduce excessive pitching in forward flight and 2° to the right to compensate for translating tendency from the tail rotor's thrust. Aerodynamic innovations include a biplane tailplane stabiliser for greater low speed stability, and a quieter canted fenestron which combined produce an extra 80 kg of lift. The H160 is the first civilian helicopter to utilise a canted fenestron anti-torque tail rotor. The H160 will be powered by two Safran Arrano turboshaft engines; a second engine, the Pratt & Whitney Canada PW210E, was to be offered as an alternative option, but this was eliminated due to insufficient power output and to reduce design complexity. A redundant backup for the gearbox lubrication system enables in excess of five hours of flight following a primary failure without causing mechanical damage.

In early 2015, Airbus claimed that the H160 is intended to have a "day one" availability rate expectation exceeding 95 percent. The H160 features the Helionix avionics suite, the cockpit being equipped with a total of four 6 in × 8 in (15 cm × 20 cm) multifunctional displays. Airbus Helicopters collaborated with Esterline CMC to develop portions of the avionics, such as the CMA-9000 Flight Management System and the CMA-5024 GPS landing system sensor, to automate the landing process. A full flight simulator has also been developed for the H160, in partnership with Helisim and Thales Group. The avionics provide a level of commonality with the company's earlier Eurocopter EC145 T2 and Eurocopter EC175 helicopters. Commentators have stated that this commonality to be similar to AgustaWestland's rotorcraft family concept.

== Accidents ==
- On Friday, 2 January 2026, at 8:58 a.m. (local time), a Brazilian-registered Airbus Helicopters H160B crashed in the South Atlantic. Using an autorotation maneuver, the pilot successfully made an emergency water landing, activating the flotation systems. The two crew members and six passengers were rescued and escaped unharmed. This is the first recorded crash of the type.

== Variants ==
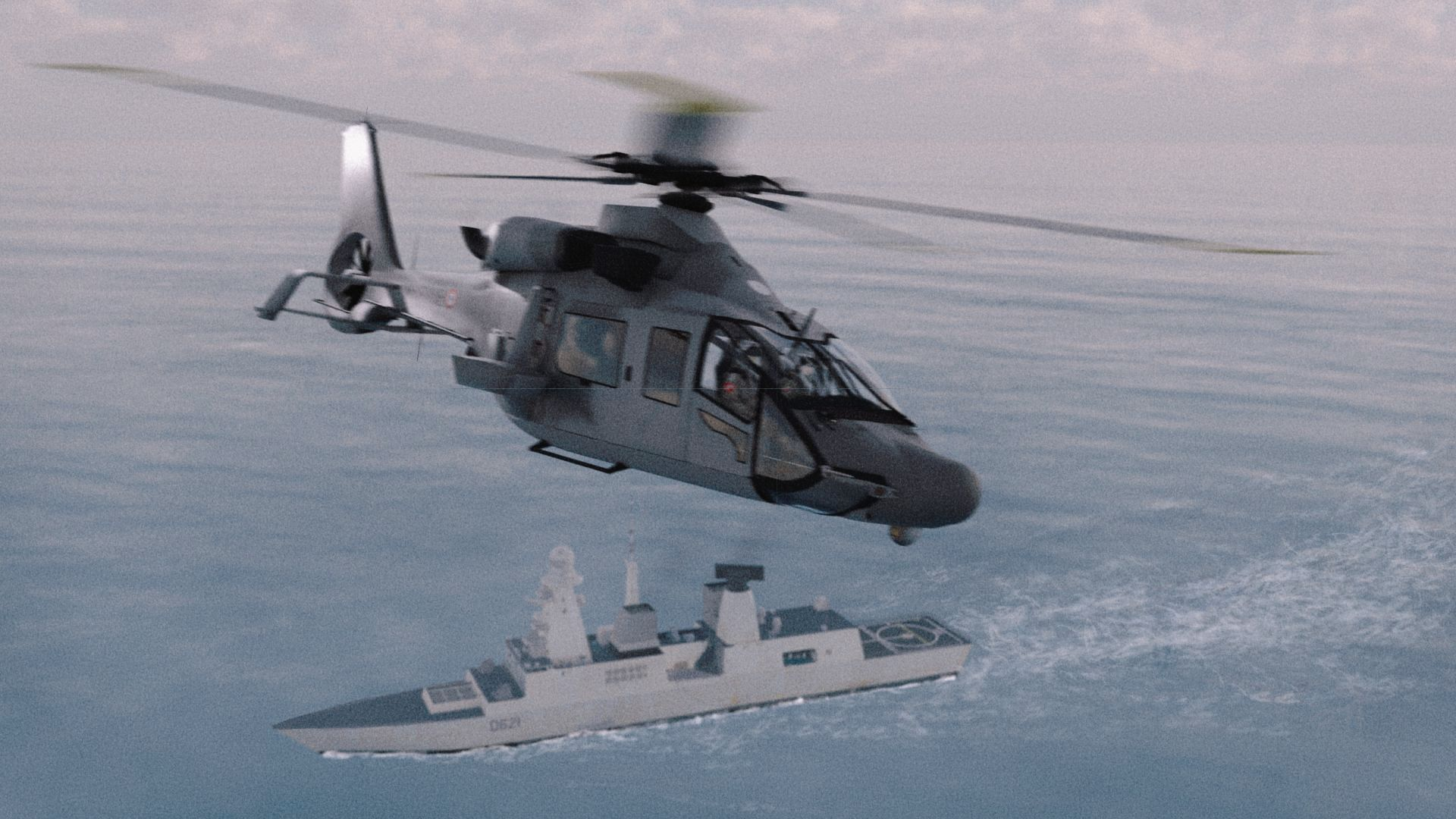
The H160M variant planned for the French Navy, with a prominent radome mounted on the nose of the aircraft, weapon carriers on the sides, and upward-facing exhaust tailpipes for infrared suppression.

=== Civilian ===
H160
Prototype civil-orientated model. 3 built.
- PT1 powered by PWC PT6 engines, first flew 13 June 2015.
- PT2 powered by Safran Arrano engines, first flew 27 Jan 2016.
- PT3 fitted with cabin interior and first flew 13 October 2017

H160-B
Civil production variant, certified in July 2020.

H160FI

Parapublic version derived from the H160-B and used by the French Navy for SAR missions. FI = Force Interim. Leased from the contractor Babcock International.

ACH160
VIP/executive variant with "Airbus Corporate Helicopters" model prefix.

=== Military ===
H160M

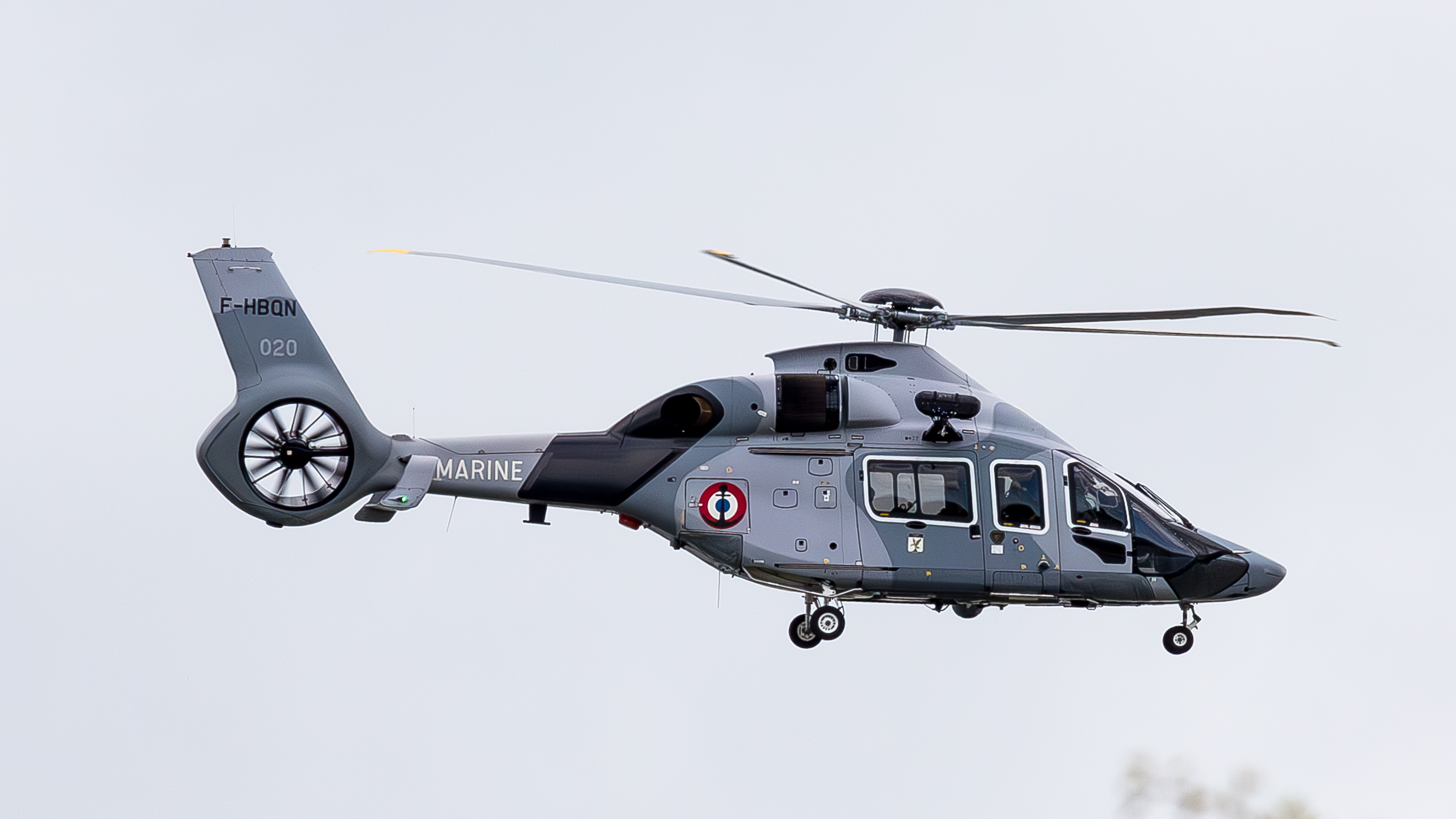
A French Navy H160FI.

Base military-orientated model. Will be armed with anti-ship Sea Venom (missile).
HIL H160M Guépard
(hélicoptère interarmées léger - Joint Light Helicopter) Version developed for the French Armed Forces.

== Operators ==
France
French Army (French army aviation)
- 80 H160M Guépard on order
French Air and Space Force
- 40 H160M Guépard on order
French Navy (French Naval Aviation)
- 6 H160 in service for maritime search and rescue
- 49 H160M Guépard on order
French Gendarmerie
- 1 H160 in service for 10 on order
Ghana
Ghana Air Force
- 1 ACH160 on order
Romania
Ministry of Internal Affairs (General Inspectorate of Aviation)
- 7 H160 on order
United States
New York State Police
- 1 H160 on order
Japan
Japan Fire and Disaster Management Agency
- 1 H160 on order

== Specifications (H160) ==
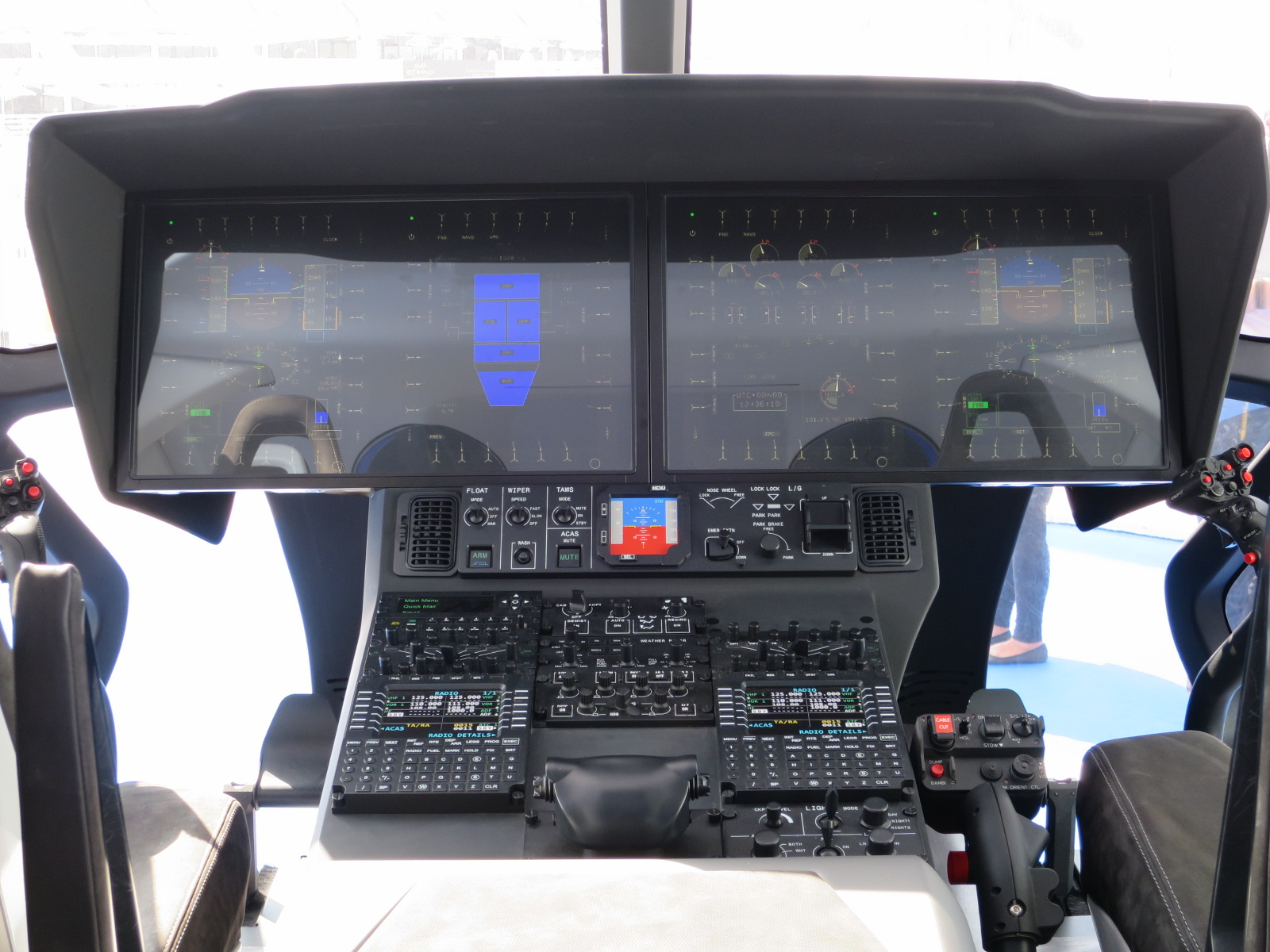
H160 cockpit mockup

Data from Airbus

General characteristics

- Crew: 1/2
- Capacity: 12
- Length: 13.96 m (45 ft 10 in)
- Width: 3.54 m (11 ft 7 in)
- Height: 4.91 m (16 ft 1 in)
- Empty weight: 4,050 kg (8,929 lb)
- Max takeoff weight: 6,050 kg (13,338 lb)
- Useful load: up to 2,000 kg (4,400 lb)
- Fuel capacity: 1,120 kg (2,470 lb)
- Powerplant: 2 × Safran Arrano 1A turboshaft engines, 955 kW (1,280 shp) each
- Main rotor diameter: 13.40 m (43.96 ft)
- Main rotor area: 141 m^{2} (1,520 sq ft)

Performance

- Cruise speed: 255 km/h (158 mph, 138 kn)
- Never exceed speed: 315 km/h (196 mph, 170 kn)
- Range: 880 km (550 mi, 475 nmi)
- Endurance: 4 h 30 min with standard fuel tanks
- Service ceiling: 6,096 m (20,000 ft) , 9,300 ft (2,835 m) hover ceiling IGE
- Disk loading: 42.9 kg/m^{2} (8.8 lb/sq ft)

== See also ==
Aircraft of comparable role, configuration, and era

- AgustaWestland AW139
- HAL Dhruv
- Kamov Ka-60
- Sikorsky S-76
- TAI T625
- KAI LCH
- KAI LAH
- Bell 412
