= Blue Edge =

Helicopter rotor design

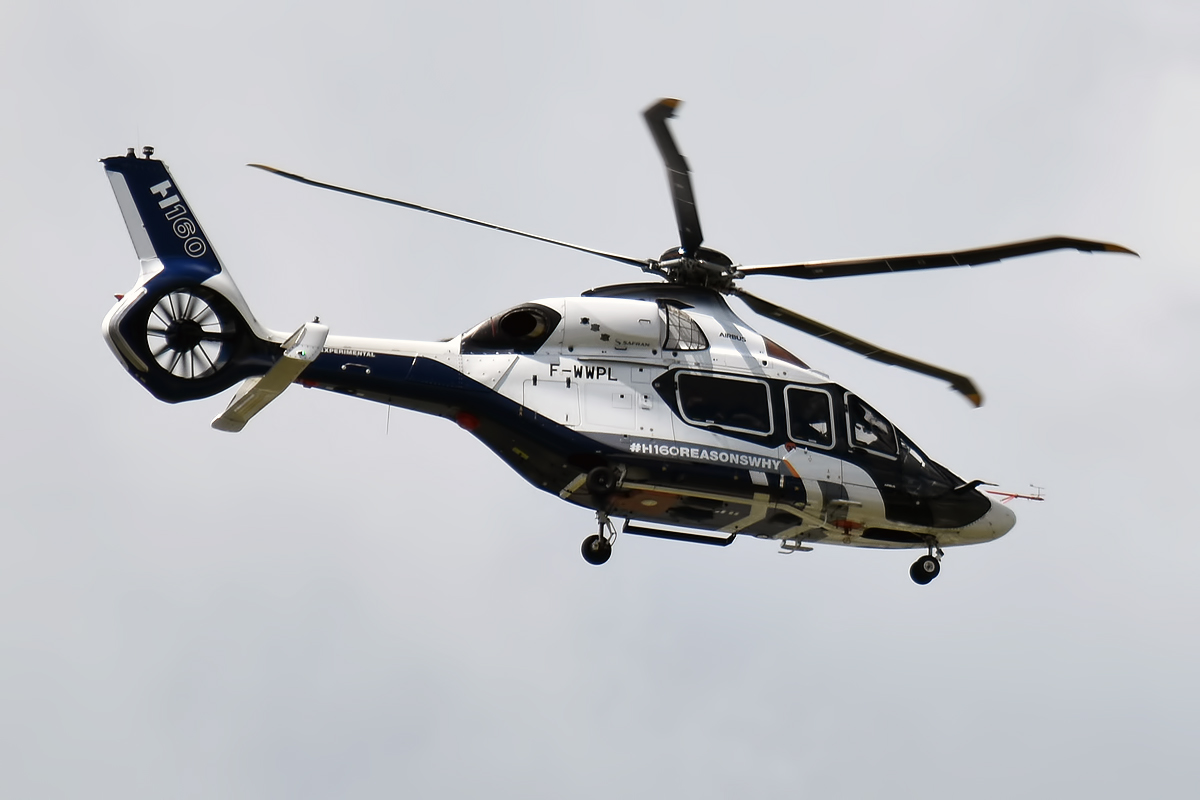
The Airbus Helicopters H160 with the new Blue Edge rotor design.

Blue Edge is an advanced design of rotor blade developed and produced by multinational helicopter manufacturer Airbus Helicopters in cooperation with the French aerospace laboratory ONERA and the German Aerospace Center, purposed to achieve a meaningful reduction in both noise emissions and vibration as well as enhancement in aerodynamic efficiency for helicopters' operations.

Its existence was publicly revealed at the Heli-Expo 2010 in Houston, Texas. During 2014, Airbus Helicopters commenced flight testing of the Bluecopter Demonstrator, equipped with Blue Edge rotor blades amongst several other technologies. It has been incorporated onto several production helicopters, including the Airbus Helicopters H160 and the Airbus Helicopters H145.

== Development ==
The Blue Edge rotor was originally developed at ONERA and the German Aerospace Center under the auspices of the ERATO program. The agencies had a historic partnership with multinational helicopter manufacturer Airbus Helicopters, pooling resources and data on rotorcraft-related research; during 2000, a research agreement between the three parties was signed to develop a full scale rotor blade for flight testing. According to aerospace researcher Yves Delrieux, the design of the Blue Edge rotor blade was defined using tools developed by ONERA from wind tunnel testing to model aerodynamic performance; these tools were claimed to have achieved a reduction in noise emissions and vibration as well as greater aerodynamic efficiency over conventional modes.

During July 2007, flight testing of a five-bladed main rotor incorporating the Blue Edge blade design commenced using a modified Eurocopter EC155. The technology was first announced by Eurocopter at Heli-Expo 2010 in Houston, Texas; at the event, a company spokesperson claimed that tests conducted by the firm have indicated the new rotor blade was able to reduce the noise produced by a helicopter by three to four decibels. Eurocopter had referred to the blades as part of their new range of "Bluecopter" technology; this range also includes the Blue Pulse system of three flaps set into the trailing edge of each rotor blade.

In 2011, the company announced the Airbus Helicopters H160, originally referred to by the designation of X4, promoting its use of advanced technologies. Such features reportedly included the Blue Edge rotor blades, advanced pilot assistance functionality, and reduced vibration to "near-jet" levels of smoothness. Thus, the H160 is the first production rotorcraft be equipped with Blue Edge technology. Its rotor blades incorporates a double-swept shape that reduces the noise generation of blade-vortex interactions (BVI), a phenomenon which occurs when the blade impacts a vortex created at its tip, resulting in a 3–4 dB noise reduction and raising the effective payload by 100 kg (220 lb) compared with a scaled Eurocopter AS365 Dauphin equivalent.

During 2014, Airbus Helicopters commenced flight testing of the Bluecopter Demonstrator, an extensively modified unique model of the Eurocopter EC135. In addition to the presence of the Blue Edge swept rotor blades, the demonstrator was outfitted with numerous other features for the purpose of exploring more efficient design elements, including economy-optimised single-engine operations, a relocated horizontal stabilizer outside the main rotor's downwash, an active rudder, and new water-based external paint; these changes were reportedly aimed at achieving a 40% reduction in overall fuel consumption from the standard model. In December 2014, it was revealed that the single-engine operations portion of the Bluecopter tests had been delayed to summer 2016 to perform necessary avionics changes, reportedly connected to the engine's FADEC systems.

In March 2019, Airbus Helicopters announced that it was developing, in cooperation with Japanese manufacturer Kawasaki, an upgraded model of its existing Eurocopter EC145 helicopter. Chiefly amongst its new features were a new bearingless five-bladed main rotor incorporating Blue Edge technologies, the testing of which had commenced back in April 2018. Furthermore, such changes are able to be retrofitted to existing H145s.

== See also ==
- British Experimental Rotor Programme
