= Helicopter noise reduction =

Reducing the noise caused by helicopters

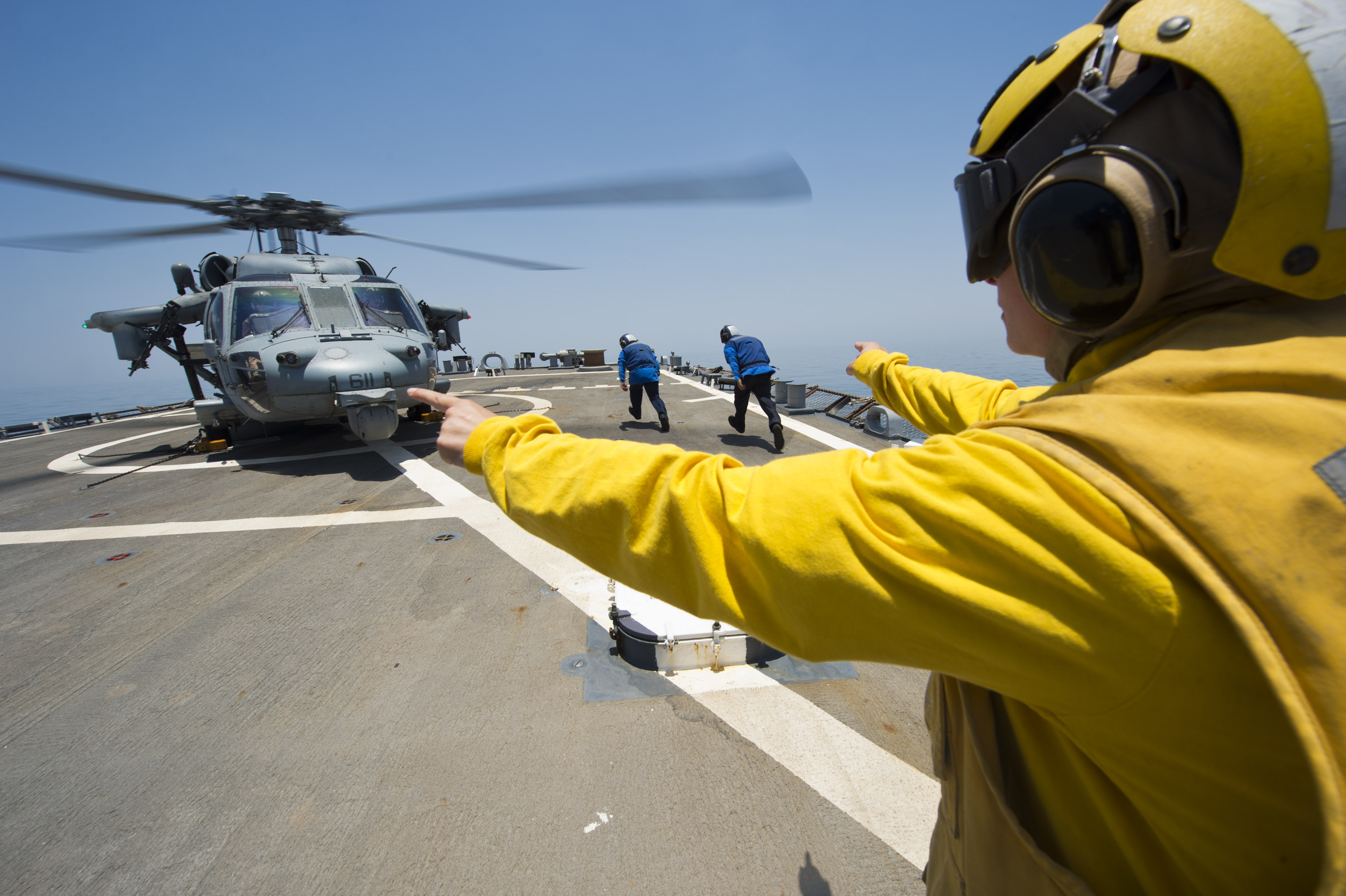
Helicopter marshallers use hearing protection.

Helicopter noise reduction is a topic of research into designing helicopters which can be operated more quietly, reducing the public-relations problems with night-flying or expanding an airport. In addition, it is useful for military applications in which stealth is required: long-range propagation of helicopter noise can alert an enemy to an incoming helicopter in time to re-orient defenses (see acoustic signature).

== Sources of helicopter noise ==
The noise from a rotor can be divided into several distinct sources, which will be described as follows:

=== Thickness noise ===
Thickness noise is dependent only on the shape and motion of the blade, and can be thought of as being caused by the displacement of the air by the rotor blades. It is primarily directed in the plane of the rotor.

=== Loading noise ===
Loading noise is an aerodynamic adverse effect due to the acceleration of the force distribution on the air around the rotor blade due to the blade passing through it, and is directed primarily below the rotor. In general, loading noise can include numerous types of blade loading: some special sources of loading noise are identified separately.

Changes in blade-section motion relative to the observer as the steadily loaded propeller rotates, generally referred to as "loading" noise. This source tends to dominate at low blade speed.

=== Blade-vortex interaction noise ===
Blade vortex interaction (BVI) occurs when a rotor blade passes within a close proximity of the shed tip vortices from a previous blade. This causes a rapid, impulsive change in the loading on the blade resulting in the generation of highly directional impulsive loading noise. BVI noise can occur on either the advancing or retreating side of the rotor disk and its directivity is characterized by the precise orientation of the interaction. In general, advancing side BVI noise is directed down and forward while retreating-side BVIs cause noise that is directed down and rearward. It has been shown that the main parameters governing the strength of a BVI are the distance between the blade and the vortex, the vortex strength at the time of the interaction, and how parallel or oblique the interaction is.

=== Broadband noise ===
Another form of loading noise, broadband noise consists of various stochastic noise sources. Turbulence ingestion through the rotor, the rotor wake itself, and blade self-noise are each sources of broadband noise.

=== High-speed impulsive (HSI) noise ===
HSI noise is caused by transonic flow shock formation on the advancing rotor blade, and is distinct from loading noise. The source of HSI noise is the flow volume around the advancing blade tip, hence it cannot be captured by examining only the acoustic sources on the surface of the blade, HSI noise is typically directed in the rotor plane forward of the helicopter, like thickness noise.

=== Tail rotor noise ===
While most noise from a helicopter is generated by the main rotor, the tail rotor is a significant source of noise for observers relatively close to the helicopter, where the higher-frequency noise of the tail rotor has not yet been attenuated by the atmosphere. Tail rotor noise is particularly annoying to the human listener due to its higher frequency (as compared to the main rotor) which places it directly in the band in which the human ear is most sensitive.

== Methods of noise reduction ==
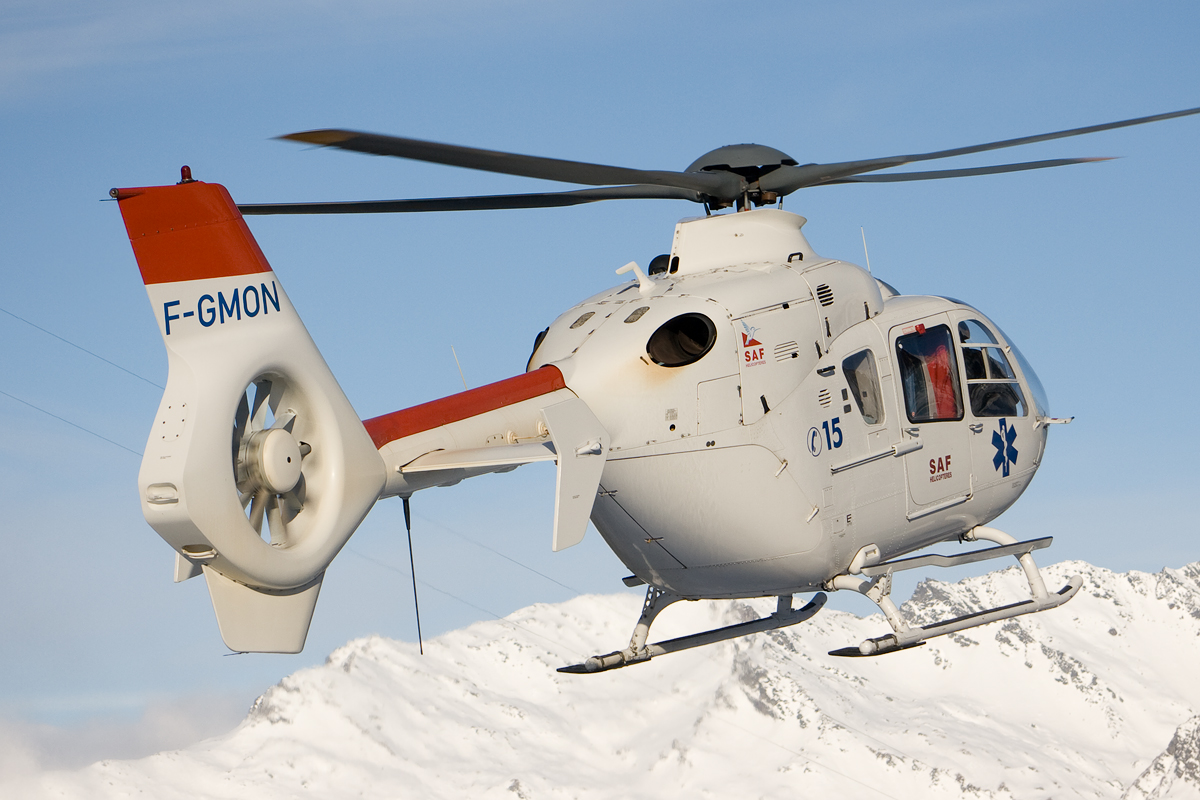
Fenestron of a Eurocopter EC-135.

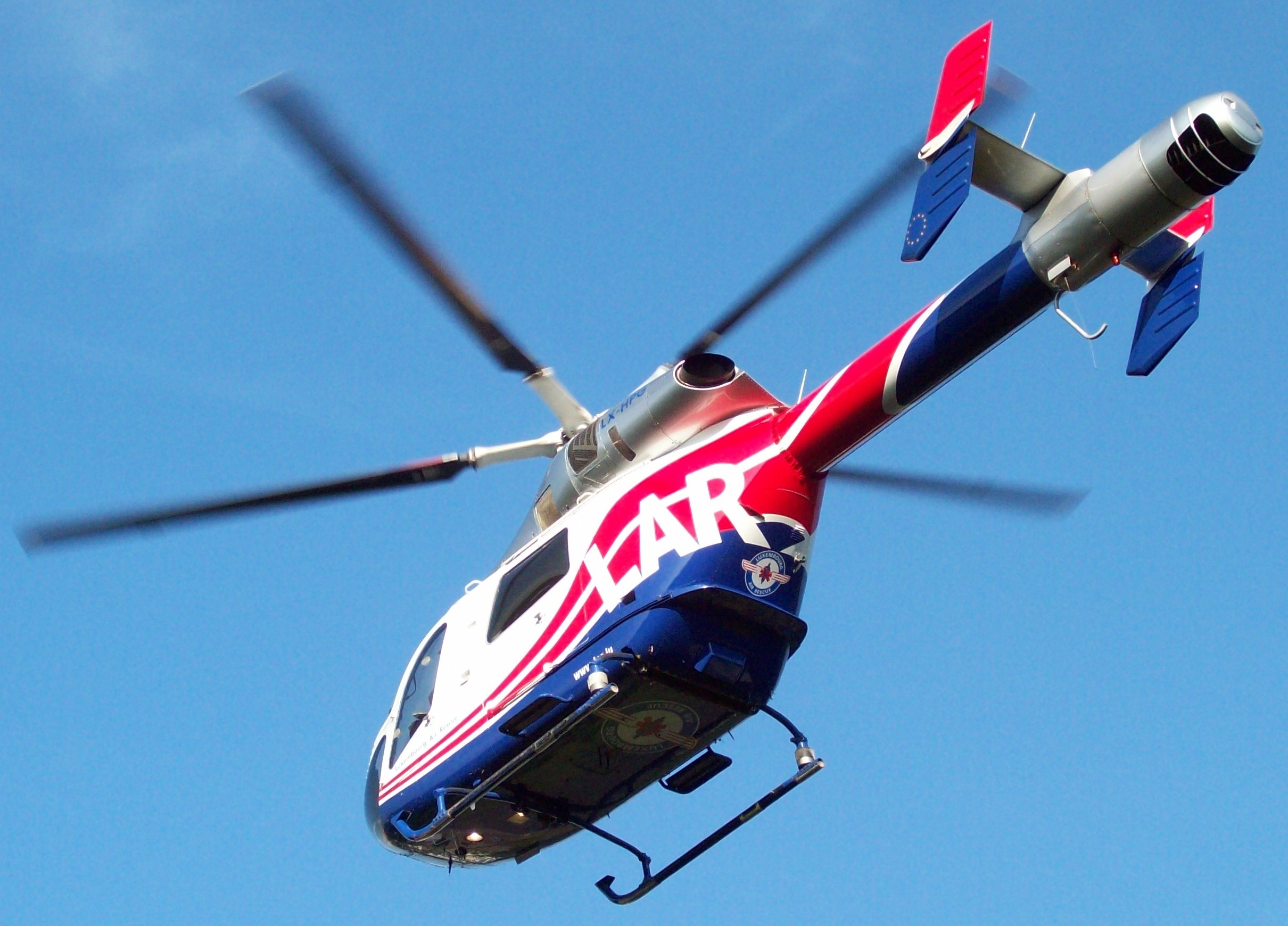
NOTAR of a MD Helicopters MD Explorer.

Almost all helicopter engines are located above the aircraft, which tends to direct much of the engine-noise upwards. In addition, with the advent of the turbine engine, noise from the engine plays a much smaller role than it once did. Most research is now directed towards reducing the noise from the main and tail rotors.

A tail-rotor which is recessed into the fairing of the tail (a fenestron) reduces the noise level directly below the aircraft, which is useful in urban areas. In addition, this type of rotor typically has anywhere from 8 to 12 blades (as compared to 2 or 4 blades on a conventional tail rotor), increasing the frequency of the noise and thus its attenuation by the atmosphere. In addition, the placement of the tail rotor within a shroud can prevent the formation of tip vortices. This type of rotor is in general much quieter than its conventional counterpart: the price paid is a substantial increase in the weight of the aircraft, and the weight that must be supported by the tail boom. For example, the Eurocopter EC-135 has such a design.

For smaller helicopters, it may be advantageous to use a NOTAR (from NO Tail Rotor) system. In this yaw-control method, air is blown out of vents along the tail boom, producing thrust via the Coandă effect.

Some designs have been done to reduce the rotor noise itself, for example the Comanche military helicopter attempted many stealth mechanisms, including attempts to quiet the rotor. One possible technique for reducing helicopter rotor noise is "modulated blade spacing". Standard rotor blades are evenly spaced, and produce greater noise at a particular frequency and its harmonics. Using varying degrees of spacing between the blades spreads the noise or acoustic signature of the rotor over a greater range of frequencies.

== See also ==
- Aircraft noise
- Aviation and the environment
- Acoustic quieting
- Aeronautical engineering
- BERP rotor
- Helicopter rotor
- Noise pollution
- Noise regulation
- QTOL
- Stealth helicopter
