= Acoustic quieting =

Damping unwanted vibrations of machinery

Acoustic quieting is the process of making machinery quieter by damping vibrations to prevent them from reaching an observer. Machinery vibrates, causing sound waves in air, hydroacoustic waves in water, and mechanical stresses in solid matter. Quieting is achieved by absorbing the vibrational energy or minimizing the source of the vibration. It may also be redirected away from an observer.

One of the major reasons for the development of acoustic quieting techniques was for making submarines difficult to detect by sonar. This military goal of the mid- and late-twentieth century allowed the technology to be adapted to many industries and products, such as computers (e.g. hard drive technology), automobiles (e.g. motor mounts), and even sporting goods (e.g. golf clubs).

== Aspects of acoustic quieting ==
When the goal is acoustic quieting, a number of different aspects might be considered. Each aspect of acoustics can be taken alone or in concert so that the result is that the reception of noise by the observer is minimized.

Acoustic quieting might consider:

- Noise generation: by limiting the noise at its source,
- Sympathetic vibrations: by acoustic decoupling,
- Resonations: by acoustic damping or changing the size of the resonator,
- Sound transmissions: by reducing transmission using many methods (depending whether the transmission is through air, liquid, or solid), or
- Sound reflections: by limiting the reflection using many methods, e.g. by using acoustic absorption (deadening) materials, trapping the sound, opening a "window" to let sound out, etc.

By analyzing the entire sequence of events, from the source to the observer, an acoustic engineer can provide many ways to quieten the machine. The challenge is to do this in a practical and inexpensive way. The engineer might focus on changing materials, using a damping material, isolating the machine, running the machine in a vacuum, or running the machine slower.

== Methods of quieting ==
=== Mechanical acoustic quieting ===
- Sound isolation: Noise isolation is isolating noise to prevent it from transferring out of one area, using barriers like deadening materials to trap sound and vibrational energy. Example: In home and office construction, many builders place sound-control barriers (such as fiberglass batting) in walls to deaden the transmission of noise through them.

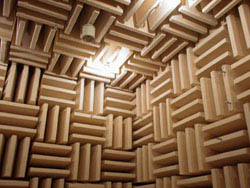
A sound proof room, showing acoustic damping tiles used for noise absorption and soundproofing

- Noise absorption: In architectural acoustics, unwanted sounds can be absorbed rather than reflected inside the room of an observer. This is useful for noises with no point source and when a listener needs to hear sounds only from a point source and not echo reflections. Example: In a recording studio, sound proofing is accomplished with bass traps and anechoic chambers. Wallace Sabine, an American physicist, is credited with studying sound reverberations in 1900, and Carl Eyring revised his equations in 1930 for Bell Labs. Another example is the widespread use of dropped ceilings and acoustical tiles in modern office buildings with high ceilings. Submarine hulls have special coatings that absorb sound.
- Acoustic damping: Vibration isolation prevents vibration from transferring beyond the device into another material. Damping mounts have progressed in the industry to offer vibrational resistance in many degrees of freedom. Recent advances include shock isolators damping in at least six degrees of freedom. Acoustic damping also has uses in seismic shock protection of buildings. Motors and rotating shafts are commonly fitted with these mounts at the points where they contact the building or the chassis of a large machine.
- Acoustic decoupling: certain parts of a machine can be built to keep the frame, chassis, or external shafts from receiving unwanted vibrations from a moving part. Example: Volkswagen has registered a patent for an "acoustically decoupled underbody for a motor vehicle.". Another example: Western Digital has registered a patent for an "acoustic vibration decoupler for a disk drive pivot bearing assembly.".
- Preventing stalls: Whenever a machine undergoes an aerodynamic stall, it will abruptly vibrate.
- Preventing cavitation: When a machine is in contact with a fluid, it may be susceptible to cavitation. The sounds of gas bubbles imploding is the source of the noise. Ships and submarines which have screws that cavitate are more vulnerable to detection by sonar.
- Preventing water hammer: In hydraulics and plumbing, water hammer is a known cause for the failure of piping systems. It also generates considerable noise. A valve that abruptly opens or shuts is the most common cause for water hammer.
- Shock absorption: Just as automotive shock absorbers are used to prevent mechanical shocks from reaching the passengers in a car, they are also important for quieting shocks.
- Reduction of resonance: Essentially any piece of metal or glass has certain frequencies to which it is susceptible to resonate. A machine that resonates would make a tremendous noise. Resonance also occurs in enclosures, such as when echoes reverberate in an ocarina or the pipe of a pipe organ.
- Material selection: By choosing nonmetallic components, the transmission of sound and vibrations can be minimized. For example: instead of using rigid brass fittings, a machine using flexible plastic pipe fittings may be much quieter. In some cases air can be evacuated from a machine and sealed hermetically, the vacuum inside becoming a barrier to sound transmission. In cases where porous plastic materials are used in acoustic applications, the porosity of the plastic is adjusted to either damp specific wavelengths or for minimal sound loss in a speaker grill cover.

=== Quieting for specific observers ===
- Underwater acoustics: All of the above types of acoustic quieting apply to submarines. Additionally, a submarine may employ a tactic that prevent sounds from reaching a listener at a particular ocean depth. Operating below the depth of the sound channel axis, where the speed of sound in water is the lowest, a submarine can prevent detection by surface ships, unless these ships use equipment like a towed array and/or an underwater drone to place hydrophones below the sound channel axis.
- Sound refraction: Just as a submarine can use refraction to hide its acoustic signature from surface vessels, the same principle of sound refraction can be used to prevent certain observers from hearing the noise. For example, an outdoor observer close to the ground will have sound waves refracted toward him when the ground is cooler than the ambient air and away from him when the ground is hotter than the air.
- Sound redirection: One of the obvious ways to reduce the received sound level of an observer is to place the observer out of the path of the highest amplitude sounds. For example, in the area around a jet engine, the sound power levels can be expected to be largest (i.e., loudest) directly in line with the jet's exhaust. Observations perpendicular to the exhaust would be significantly quieter.
- Hearing protection: An observer may be forced to wear ear plugs in areas of high ambient noise levels. This may be the only quieting method available in areas of noise pollution, such as an open-air firing range or an airport.

=== Electronic quieting ===
- Electronic vibration control: Electronics, sensors, and computers are now employed to reduce vibration. Using high speed logic, vibrations can be damped quickly and effectively by counteracting the motion before it exceeds a certain threshold.
- Electronic noise control: Electronics, sensors, and computers are also employed to cancel noise by using phase cancellation which matches the sound amplitude with a wave of the opposite polarity. This method employs the use of an active sound generating device, such as a loudspeaker to counteract ambient noise in an area. See noise-canceling headphone. Workers in noisy environments may favor this method over ear plugs.
- Noise reduction: In sound and video equipment, noise reduction is the process of removing noise from a signal. This is strictly for electronic noise or noise which has been detected and put into electronic form.
- Noise canceling: If both the noise and the signal are received by an electronic or digital medium, noise can be filtered from the signal electronically and retransmitted without the noise. See noise-canceling microphone. Helicopter pilots rely on this technology to speak on the radio.

== See also ==
- Acoustic signature
- Noise reduction, for electronic noise
- Sound masking, for noise masking by saturation
- Pink noise
- Stealth technology, for signature reduction in general
- Longitudinal wave
- Soundproofing
- Mechanical resonance
- Sound masking
- Seismic retrofit
- Helicopter noise reduction
- Muffler
- Deperming
- Degaussing
