= Martin Lowson =

- Born: Martin Vincent Lowson; 5 January 1938; Totteridge, England
- Died: 15 June 2013 (aged 75)
- Occupation: Engineer

Professor Martin Lowson (5 January 1938 – 14 June 2013) was an aeronautical engineer. He held a number of senior academic appointments in UK and US universities, was a co-patentee of the BERP helicopter rotor system, and also made a significant contribution to the development of personal rapid transport systems.

== Biography ==
Martin Vincent Lowson was born in Totteridge, Hertfordshire, on 5 January 1938.

He attended The King's School in Worcester, after which he became an apprentice with Vickers-Armstrong. Lowson gained a PhD in 1963, after which he spent a year in the Institute of Sound & Vibration Research, where he worked on aero-acoustics. In this year he produced a number of important papers on noise generation which are still regarded as fundamental in the field as of 2013.

Lowson married Ann Pennicutt in 1961. They had two children, Sarah and Jonathan. Lowson's interests included squash and bluegrass music.

Lowson died of a stroke on 14 June 2013, at the age of 75.

== Honours and awards ==
- Royal Aeronautical Society Award for contributions to world’s first man powered flight 1961
- Fellow of the Acoustical Society of America 1969
- Fellow of the Royal Academy of Engineering 1991
- Busk Prize of Royal Aeronautical Society for best paper in Aerodynamics 1992.
- Queens Award for Technology received by Westland Team for BERP blade 1994
- Fellow of the American Institute of Aeronautics and Astronautics 1995
- British Wind Energy Association Award for Research 1997
- Altran Prize for Innovations to improve urban quality of life 2001
- Fellow, Chartered Institute of Transport 2003
- Viva Award for Transport Innovation from Worshipful Company of Carmen 2010
