= Safran Arrano =

Turboshaft engine for helicopters

Arrano
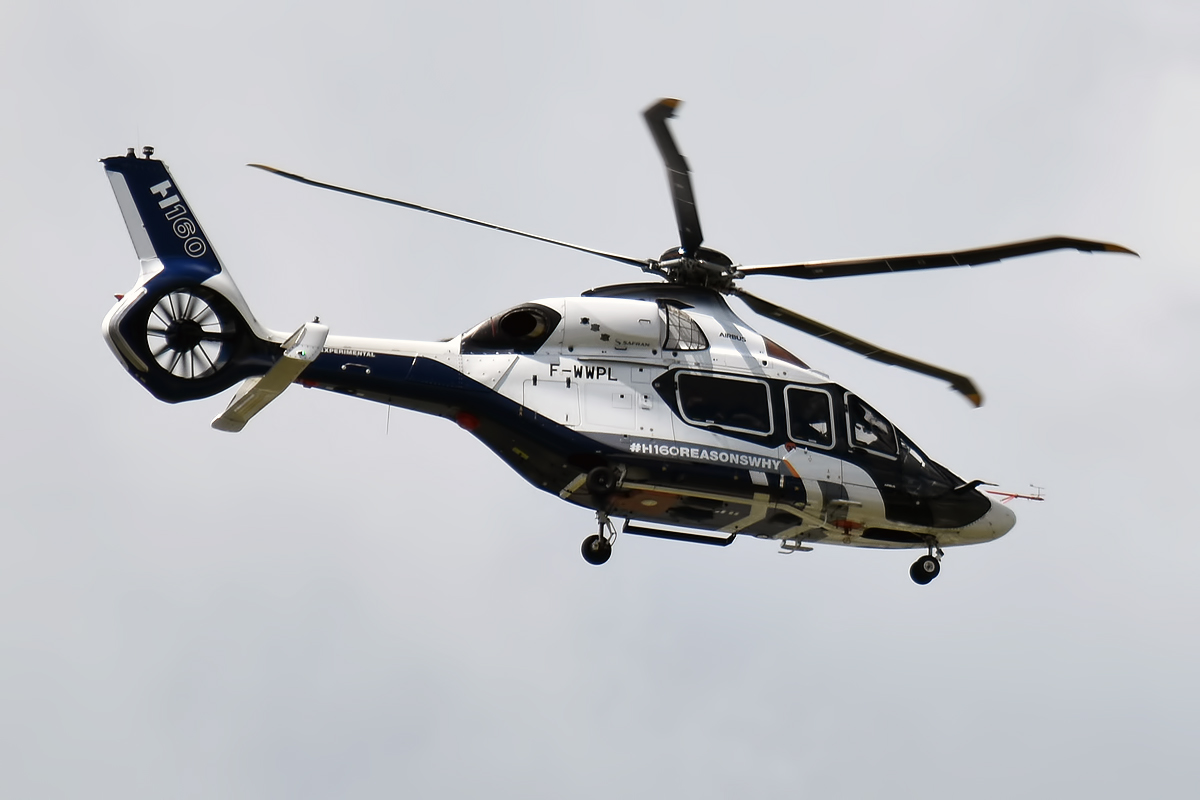
- The Arrano is the default engine option powering the Airbus Helicopters H160
- Type: Turboshaft
- National origin: France
- Manufacturer: Safran Helicopter Engines
- First run: February 2014
- Major applications: Airbus Helicopters H160

The Safran Arrano is a turboshaft engine for two-to-three ton single-engine and four-to-six ton twin-engine helicopters, developed by Safran Helicopter Engines, outputting 1,100 to 1,300 hp (820 to 970 kW).

== Development ==
First bench tested in February 2014 in Bordes, Pyrénées-Atlantiques, its thermodynamic core comes from the Clean Sky Tech 800 demonstrator, first tested in April 2013. It powers the Airbus Helicopters H160 which made its maiden flight in Marignane on 27 January 2016.

By October 2017, it has amassed 4,000h of testing and 700h of flight time, the first production units should be delivered in early 2018 and the H160 should enter service in 2019. It passed blade-out tests, continued operation with no lubrication, altitude trials in 2016 in Saclay and in 2017 endurance should be tested in all operating conditions for certification. By October 2018, the programme had accumulated 7,500h, including 1,500h of flight time, certification testing was close to the end and most of the documentation should be submitted by the end of the year.

The turboshaft received its type certificate during the June 2019 Paris Air Show, before EASA approval for the H160 planned for the fourth quarter and first delivery to a US customer for corporate transport in May 2020.

== Design ==
It should reduce brake specific fuel consumption by 10 to 15% compared to previous engines, contribute to increase new helicopters payload-range performance, with reduced size and is designed to facilitate maintenance and repairs. In cruise, its thermodynamic cycle is improved by variable-pitch inlet guide vanes above the compressor. Direct metal laser sintering (selective laser melting) is used for serial production of the combustion chamber injectors.

== Applications ==
- Airbus Helicopters H160

== Specifications ==
Data from EASA

==== General characteristics ====
- Type: turboshaft
- Length: 1,219 mm (48.0 in)
- Diameter: 817×623.2 mm (32.17×24.54 in)
- Dry weight: 175.1 kg (386 lb)

==== Components ====
- Compressor: annular inlet integrating inlet guide vanes, two-stage centrifugal compressor (44,139 RPM)
- Combustors: reverse flow combustion chamber, controlled by a Full Authority Digital Engine Control
- Turbine: single-stage high pressure turbine and single-stage low pressure turbine (power turbine) driving a reduction gearbox at the front of the engine (7,939 RPM power drive)

==== Performance ====
- Maximum power output: 851 kW (1,141 hp) (at takeoff, 30s one engine inoperative: 1,061 kW (1,423 hp))
- Turbine inlet temperature: 800°C Gas generator exhaust temperature (30s one engine inoperative: 991°C)
- Power-to-weight ratio: 4.86 kW/kg (2.96 hp/lb)

== See also ==
Comparable engines

- Pratt & Whitney Canada PW200
- Pratt & Whitney Canada PT6
- HAL HTSE-1200
