= BERP rotor =

Rotor blade design

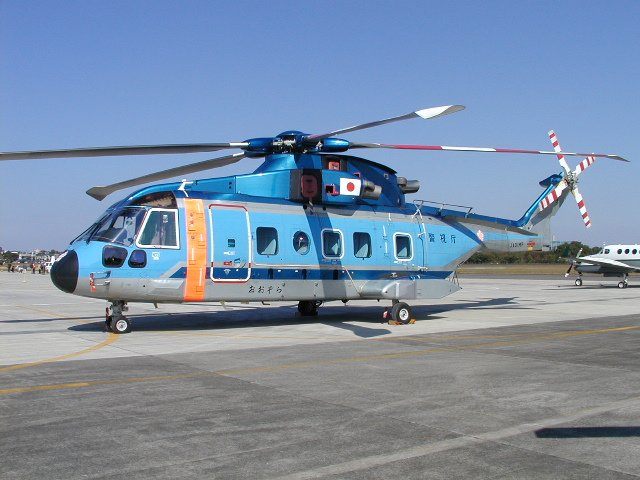
Tokyo Metropolitan Police Department EH101 (AW101)

The BERP rotor blade design was developed under the British Experimental Rotor Programme. The initial BERP rotor blades were developed in the late 1970s to mid-1980s as a joint venture programme between Westland Helicopters and the Royal Aircraft Establishment (RAE), with Professor Martin Lowson as a co-patentee. The program aimed to increase helicopter lift capability and maximum speed through novel rotor-blade designs and advanced composite materials.

== How it works ==
When local airflow exceeds Mach 1, shock waves form on curved surfaces—such as rotor leading edges—causing significant wave drag. This normally occurs on curved areas, like cockpit windows, leading edges of the wing, and similar areas where Bernoulli's principle accelerates the air. These shock waves radiate away a great amount of energy that has to be supplied by the engines, which appears to the aircraft as a whole as a large amount of additional drag, known as wave drag. It was the onset of wave drag that gives rise to the idea of a sound barrier.

Helicopters have the additional problem that their rotors move in relation to the fuselage as they rotate. Even when hovering, the rotor tips may be travelling at a significant fraction of the speed of sound. As the helicopter accelerates, its overall speed is added to that of the tips, meaning that the blades on the forward-moving side of the rotor sees significantly higher airspeed than the rearward-moving side, causing a dissymmetry of lift. This requires changes in the angle of attack of the blades to ensure the lift is similar on both sides, in spite of the great differences in relative airflow.

It is the ability of the rotor to change its lift pattern that puts a limit on the forward speed of a helicopter; at some point the forward speed means the rearward-moving blades are below their stall speed. The point where this occurs can be improved by making the rotor spin faster, but then it faces the additional problem that at high speeds the forward-moving blades are approaching the speed of sound and begin to suffer from wave drag and other negative effects.

One solution to the problem of wave drag is the same that was seen on 1950s jet fighters, the use of wing sweep. This reduces the effect of wave drag without significant negative effects except at very low speeds. In the case of fighters, this was a concern, especially at landing, but in the case of helicopters, this is less of an issue because the rotor tips do not slow significantly, even during landing. Such swept-tips can be seen a number of helicopter types from the 1970s and 80s, notably the UH-60 Blackhawk and the AH-64 Apache.

To prevent undesirable aerodynamic and inertial couplings caused by rearward shifts of the centre of gravity or aerodynamic centre relative to the blade’s elastic axis, the blade tip is designed with a forward area shift. The methodology used in the design of the BERP blade ensures that the effective Mach number normal to the blade remains nominally constant over the swept region. The maximum sweep employed on the large part of the BERP blade is 30 degrees and the tip starts at a non-dimensional radius r/R=cos 30 = 86% radius. The area distribution of this tip region is configured to ensure that the mean tip centre of pressure is located on the elastic axis of the blade. This is done by offsetting the location of the local 1/4-chord axis forward at 86% radius.

This forward offset creates a discontinuity, or ‘notch,’ in the blade’s leading edge, which further attenuates shock-wave strength on the swept tip. For example, recent calculations using a CFD code based on the Navier-Stokes equations, has shown that this "notch" actually helps to further reduce the strength of shock waves on the blade. Thus, an unexpected by-product of the notch over and above the basic effect of sweep is to help to reduce compressibility effects even further.

We must also recognize that a swept tip geometry of this sort will not necessarily improve the performance of the blade at high angle of attack corresponding to the retreating side of the disk. In fact, experience has shown that a swept tip blade can have an inferior stalling characteristic compared to the standard blade tip.

The BERP blade employs a final geometry that performs as a swept tip at high Mach numbers and low angles of attack, yet also enables the tip to operate at very high angles of attack without stalling. This latter attribute was obtained by radically increasing the sweep of the outermost part of the tip (the outer 2% approximately) to a value (70 degrees) where any significant angle of attack will cause leading edge flow separation. Because the leading edge is so highly swept, this leading edge separation develops into a vortex structure which rolls around the leading edge and eventually sits over the upper surface (as on a delta wing aircraft). This mechanism is enhanced by making the leading edge of the aerofoil in this region relatively sharp. As the angle of attack is increased, this vortex begins to develop from a point further and further forward along the leading edge, following the planform geometry into the more moderately swept region. At a sufficiently high angle of attack, the vortex will initiate close to the forward most part of the leading edge near the "notch" region.

Evidence has shown that a strong "notch" vortex is also formed, which is trailed streamwise across the blade. This vortex acts like an aerodynamic fence and retards the flow separation region from encroaching into the tip region. Further increases in angle of attack make little change to the flow structure until a very high angle of attack is reached (in the vicinity of 22 degrees!) when the flow will grossly separate. For a conventional tip planform, a similar gross flow breakdown would be expected to occur at about 12 degrees local angle of attack.

Therefore, the BERP blade manages to make the best of both worlds by reducing compressibility effects on the advancing blade and delaying the onset of retreating blade stall. The net result is a significant increase in the operational flight envelope.

== Programmes ==
The initial programme, BERP I, studied the design, manufacture and qualification of composite rotor blades. This resulted in producing new main rotor and tail rotor blades for the Westland Sea King. Following on from the first, the second programme, BERP II, analysed advanced aerofoil sections for future rotor blades. This fed into the BERP III programme.

BERP III designs have a notch toward the outer end of the rotor blade, with a greater amount of sweepback from the notch to the end of the blade compared to inboard of the notch. BERP III culminated in a technology demonstration on a Westland Lynx helicopter. In 1986, a Lynx specially modified registered G-LYNX set an absolute speed record for helicopters over a 15 and 25 km course by reaching 400.87 km/h (249.09 mph). Following the successful technology demonstration, the BERP III blade went into production.

BERP IV uses: a new aerofoil, revised blade tip shape, and increased blade twist. After 29 hours of testing it has been found to, "improve rotor flight-envelope performance, reduce power needs in hover and forward flight, ... decrease airframe and engine vibration for a range of take-off weights." Additionally "Rotor hub loading has been found to be the same or less than with the BERP III blade now fitted to the EH101" helicopter. To prevent leading edge erosion the blade will use a rubber-based tape rather than the polyurethane used on UK navy Sea Kings. Under test it was found to last five times longer, 195 minutes vs 39 min. The programme ended in August 2007

== Applications of BERP technology ==
Current applications are:

- BERP III:

AgustaWestland AW101
Upgraded Westland Super Lynx

- BERP IV:

AgustaWestland AW101

== See also ==
- Blue Edge rotor blade design
