= Greek frigate Kimon =

Greek frigate

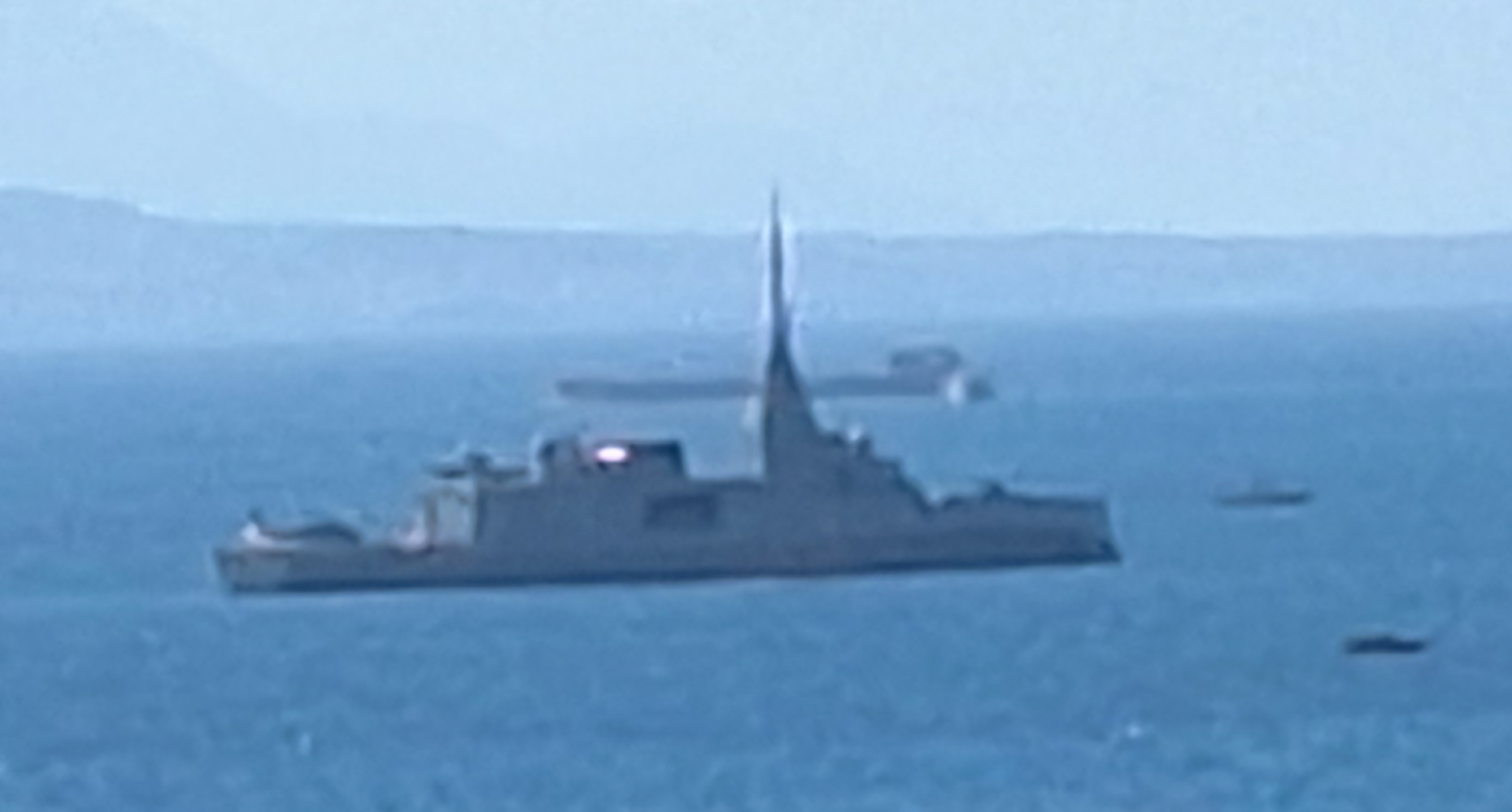
- Frigate Kimon upon arrival in Piraeus, 15 January 2026.

History

Greece
- Name: Kimon
- Namesake: General Cimon
- Builder: Naval Group
- Laid down: 21 October 2022
- Launched: 4 October 2023
- Christened: 18 December 2025
- Completed: 18 December 2025
- Home port: Salamis Naval Base
- Identification: F-601
- Status: In service

General characteristics
- Class & type: Kimon-class frigate
- Displacement: 4,603 t (4,530 long tons)
- Length: 121.6 m (398 ft 11 in)
- Beam: 17.7 m (58 ft 1 in)
- Draught: 6.2 m (20 ft 4 in)
- Propulsion: CODAD (Combined Diesel and Diesel), four Main MTU diesel engines Total output: 32,000 kW (43,000 hp)
- Speed: 27.5 knots (50.9 km/h; 31.6 mph)
- Range: 5,000 nmi (9,300 km; 5,800 mi) at 15 knots (28 km/h; 17 mph)
- Endurance: 45 days
- Complement: 110 main crew; approx. 15 air crew
- Sensors & processing systems: Search & track radar: Thales Sea Fire multi-function active electronically scanned array radar (S-band); Sonar: Kingklip Mark 2 hull-mounted sonar; CAPTAS-4 towed array sonar; Decoys: Sylena Mk1 decoy launching systems for CANTO anti-torpedo decoys
- Armament: Guns: OTO Melara 76 mm Super Rapid gun (mounted in stealth cupola); 2 × Leonardo Lionfish 20 mm RWS; Anti-ship missiles: 8 × Exocet MM-40 Block 3c; Anti-air missiles: 3 × 8 Sylver A50 8-cell VLS for 24 MBDA Aster 15 or 30, 1 × RAM Block 2B surface-to-air missiles; Land attack missiles: 1 × 8 Sylver A50 8-cell VLS for 8 MdCN; Anti-submarine: 2 × dual torpedo tubes with EuroTorp MU90 Impact torpedoes
- Aircraft carried: 1 × MH-60R Seahawk; 1 × Schiebel Camcopter S-100

Kimon (F-601) (Greek Φ/Γ Κίμων) is the lead ship of the Kimon-class frigate (FDI HN), subclass of the French Defence and intervention frigate (FDI). Construction began on 21 October 2022 in the Lorient shipyard operated by Naval Group (with its keel being laid on 21 October 2022,) until 18 December 2025 when it was delivered and commission at the same shipyard where it was built.

Kimon is the first of four frigates of the Kimon class (the four being Kimon, Nearchos, Formion, and Themistokles) ordered by the Greek government. The ship was delivered to the Hellenic Navy on 18 December 2025 and arrived in Greece on 15 January 2026. The ship's crest features an Athenian helmet, as worn by General Kimon. Behind it are depicted an ancient trireme and the words "HS KIMON", set against a background of sky and a wavy sea. The sea is illustrated with nine blue and white waves, exactly like those on the national flag.
