= Kimon-class frigate =

Planned class of frigates

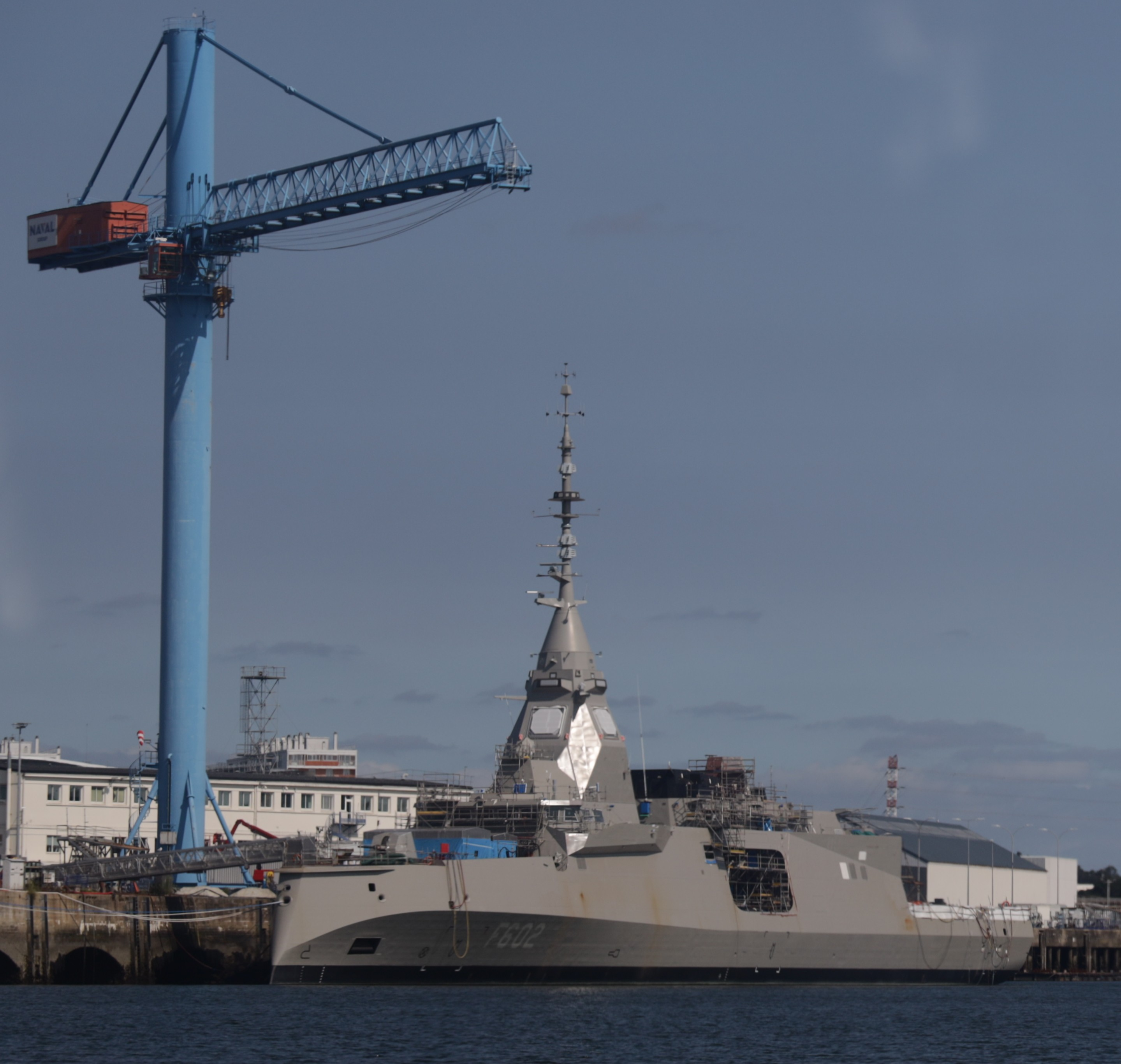
- HS Nearchos F602 under construction in Lorient, 9 August 2025.

Class overview
- Name: Kimon class
- Builders: Naval Group
- Operators: Hellenic Navy
- Preceded by: Elli class; Hydra class
- Built: 2021–
- In commission: 2025–onwards
- Planned: 4
- Building: 2
- Completed: 2

General characteristics
- Type: General purpose frigate
- Displacement: 4.460 t (4.390 long tons)
- Length: 122 m (400 ft 3 in)
- Beam: 17.7 m (58 ft 1 in)
- Installed power: 32,000 kW (43,000 shp)
- Propulsion: Combined diesel and diesel (CODAD) arrangement
- Speed: 27 knots (50 km/h; 31 mph)
- Range: 5,000 nmi (9,300 km; 5,800 mi) at 15 knots (28 km/h; 17 mph)
- Endurance: 45 days
- Complement: 110 main crew; approx. 15 air crew
- Sensors & processing systems: Search & track radar: Thales Sea Fire multi-function Active electronically scanned array radar; S-band; Sonar: Kingklip Mark 2 hull-mounted sonar; CAPTAS-4 towed array sonar; Decoys: SYLENA Mk1 decoy launching systems for CANTO anti-torpedo decoys
- Armament: Guns: Oto Melara 76 mm Super Rapid gun (mounted in stealth cupola); 2 × Leonardo Lionfish 20mm RWS; Anti-ship missiles: 8 × Exocet MM-40 Block 3c; Anti-air missiles: 3 × 8 Sylver A50 8-cell VLS for 24 MBDA Aster 15/30; 1 × RAM Block 2B surface-to-air missiles; Land attack missiles: 1 × 8 Sylver A70 8-cell VLS for 8 MdCN; Anti-submarine: 2 × dual torpedo tubes with EuroTorp MU90 Impact torpedoes
- Aircraft carried: 1 × MH-60R Seahawk; 1 × Schiebel Camcopter S-100

The Kimon class, also known as the FDI HN, is a frigate class for the Hellenic Navy. The FDI HN is a more heavily armed version of the French Defence and Intervention Frigate (FDI). The lead ship, Kimon, was originally expected to be commissioned in early 2025, however the sea trials were completed by late 2025, after which the handover took place on 18 December 2025.

== Development ==
In September 2021, the government of Greece (First Cabinet of Kyriakos Mitsotakis) signed an agreement with France's Naval Group to purchase three FDI HN frigates with an option for one more for the Hellenic Navy as part of a €3 billion ($3.34bn) defence package.

It was reported that the Hellenic Navy ships would eventually carry a more extensive weapons fit, capable of carrying up to 32 Aster-30 air defence missiles. This will permit the Hellenic Navy to operate three ships with 32 air defence missiles plus 21 point defence missiles in a Mk31 21-cell launcher of RAM Block 2B surface-to-air missiles, eight Block 3 Exocet anti-ship missiles, two dual launchers MU90 torpedoes and SYLENA Mk1 decoy launching systems (DLS) for CANTO anti-torpedo decoys. Two of the vessels, destined for the French Navy in 2025, now will be delivered to the Hellenic Navy. The date of the construction agreement was anticipated to be at late 2021 or early 2022.

On 19 September 2024 during the event of launching ceremony for the frigate Nearchos, the Defense Minister announced that Greece is starting procedures to acquire a fourth frigate of the same type. He also revealed that Greece will proceed with the order of strategic MdCN missiles. This was later confirmed by the Prime Minister of Greece Mitsotakis via social media.

=== Construction ===
In December 2021 it was reported that an agreement for construction had been signed by France and Greece with the actual contract for the construction of the ships having been signed on 24 March 2022. In February 2022, documents released by the Hellenic Parliament indicated that initially the first two frigates for the Hellenic Navy would be equipped similar to their French counterparts in a "Standard-1" configuration (with 16 Sylver A50 cells). By 2027 the two ships would be upgraded to a "Standard-2" configuration with 32 A-50 cells as well as with the RAM Block 2B. The third Hellenic Navy frigate would be built from the outset in the "Standard-2" configuration.

Since 2022, 70 contracts have been signed with Greek companies participating in the frigates' construction, involving vessels for both the Greek and French navies. In addition to other contracts, contracts concerning construction of pre-outfitted blocks in Salamis Shipyards and shipment to France for assembly, start from the third Greek frigate and involve both Greek and French frigates. In May 2025, a MoU was signed with Hellenic Aerospace Industry on integrating the latter's counter-unmanned aircraft systems (C-UAS) aboard the frigates.

In 2024 it was decided to adjust the production sequence by reassigning the fourth and fifth vessels in the production series. The fourth vessel (the previous Amiral Louzeau - D661), previously assigned to France, would instead be allocated to Greece, while the fifth ship in the series (the previous Formion - F603), previously assigned to Greece, would be destined for the French Navy instead. Each vessel would be renamed accordingly. It was unclear how this reallocation might impact the original intent to have the third Greek FDI built in an enhanced "Standard-2" configuration.

In October 2025, the Greek parliament ratified the amendment to the original purchase agreement, to include the fourth FDI vessel, named Themistocles

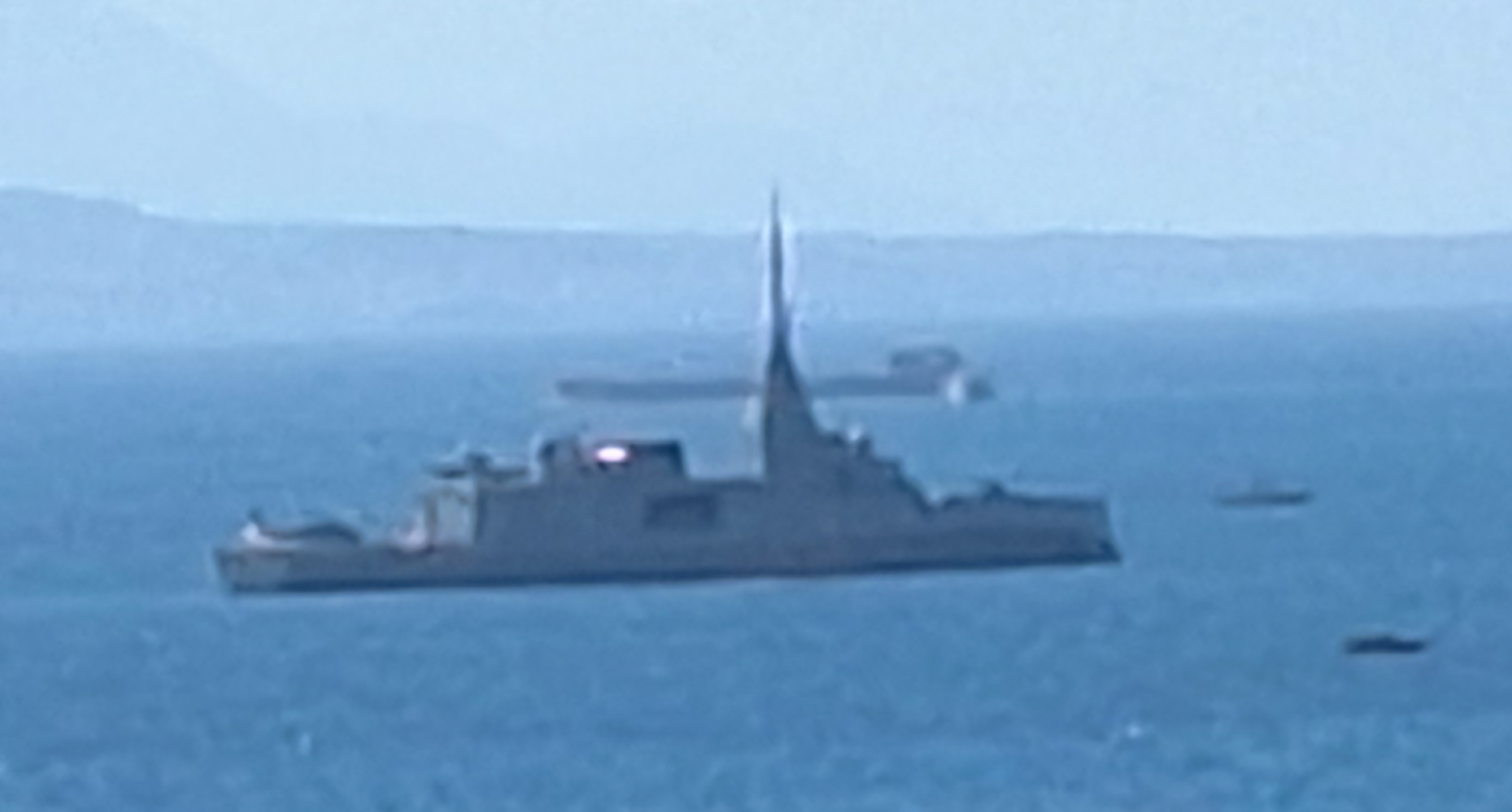
Frigate Kimon upon arrival in Piraeus, 15 January 2026.

The lead ship of the class, Kimon, was officially delivered and commissioned to the Hellenic Navy on 18 December 2025, in a ceremony attended by Greek Minister of Defense Nikos Dendias, his French counterpart, Catherine Vautrin, General Dimitrios Choupis, Chief of the Hellenic National Defense General Staff, and Vice Admiral Dimitrios-Eleftherios Kataras, Chief of the Hellenic Navy General Staff. It travelled to Brest under the Greek flag, for its weapons to be delivered. The ship arrived in Greece and was received on 15 January 2026.

Kimon-class (FDI HN) frigate evolution from Standard 1 to Standard 2++ configuration:

Standard 1 → MN/FR configuration with the addition of a LWS/L-ESM (Saab NLWS), WiMAX/5G, S-100 CAMCOPTER UAS, 76mm MFD, and LIONFISH 20 RWS instead of NARWHAL, along with other configuration differences.

Standard 2 → Addition of two A50 SYLVER VLS modules, AAW DLS (four SYLENA Mk1 launchers), 21-cell RAM launcher.

Standard 2+/2++ → Major software and system upgrades to the SETIS CMS, asymmetric warfare center, sensors (including PASEO and SENTINEL), and other electronic systems, together with full integration of the S-100 CAMCOPTER UAS and enhanced weapon-system integration, including RAM Block 2B/C and 76mm special ammunition.

Standard 2+++ (potential) → Replacement of one A50 SYLVER VLS module with an A70 SYLVER module (potentially SYLVER NG) to accommodate NCM.

Other installations: CENTAUR C-UAS Potential: R-ECM

== Operational history ==
In March 2026, Kimon was deployed to Cyprus to assist in defense against Iranian attacks together with the Hydra-class frigate Psara and four Hellenic Air Force F-16 Fighter jets.

== List of ships ==
No.	Name	Builder	Contract	Status	Steel cut	Laid down	Launched	Comm.	Notes
Hellenic Navy Kimon class (4 ordered)
F-601	Kimon	Naval Group, Lorient, France	24 Mar 2022	In service	Dec 2021	21 Oct 2022	28 Sep 2023	15 Jan 2026	Launch ceremony on 4 Oct 2023. Delivery and Greek flag raised on 18 Dec 2025..
F-602	Nearchos	Naval Group, Lorient, France	24 Mar 2022	Sea trials since 4 Feb 2026	13 Jul 2022	Late 2023	19 Sep 2024	30 Nov 2026	Delivery and Greek flag raised on 30 Oct 2026.
F-603	Formion	Naval Group, Lorient, France	24 Mar 2022	Sea trials since 22 Jun 2026	12 Jul 2023	15 Apr 2024	4 Jun 2025	Apr 2027	Planned to deliver the ship and see the Greek flag raised on 17 Dec 2026.
F-600	Themistokles	Naval Group, Lorient, France	14 Nov 2025	Under construction	30 Jun 2025	–	–	Dec 2028	

Planned dates

=== Naming ===
According to the Hellenic Navy, the ships will be named after three great ancient Greek admirals: Cimon (Greek: Κίμων, romanized: Kímon), Nearchus (Greek: Νέαρχος, romanized: Néarchos) and Phormio (Greek: Φορμίων, romanized: Formíon). The fourth frigate, which was announced to be in the acquisition process on 19 September 2024, will likely bear the name of the fourth great ancient Greek admiral Themistocles (Greek: Θεμιστοκλής, romanized: Themistoklís). These names had previously been used for the ex-US Charles F. Adams-class destroyers in service with the Hellenic Navy from 1991 to 2004.

== See also ==
- Istanbul-class frigate
- Type 26 frigate
