= Amiral Ronarc'h-class frigate =

Class of frigates

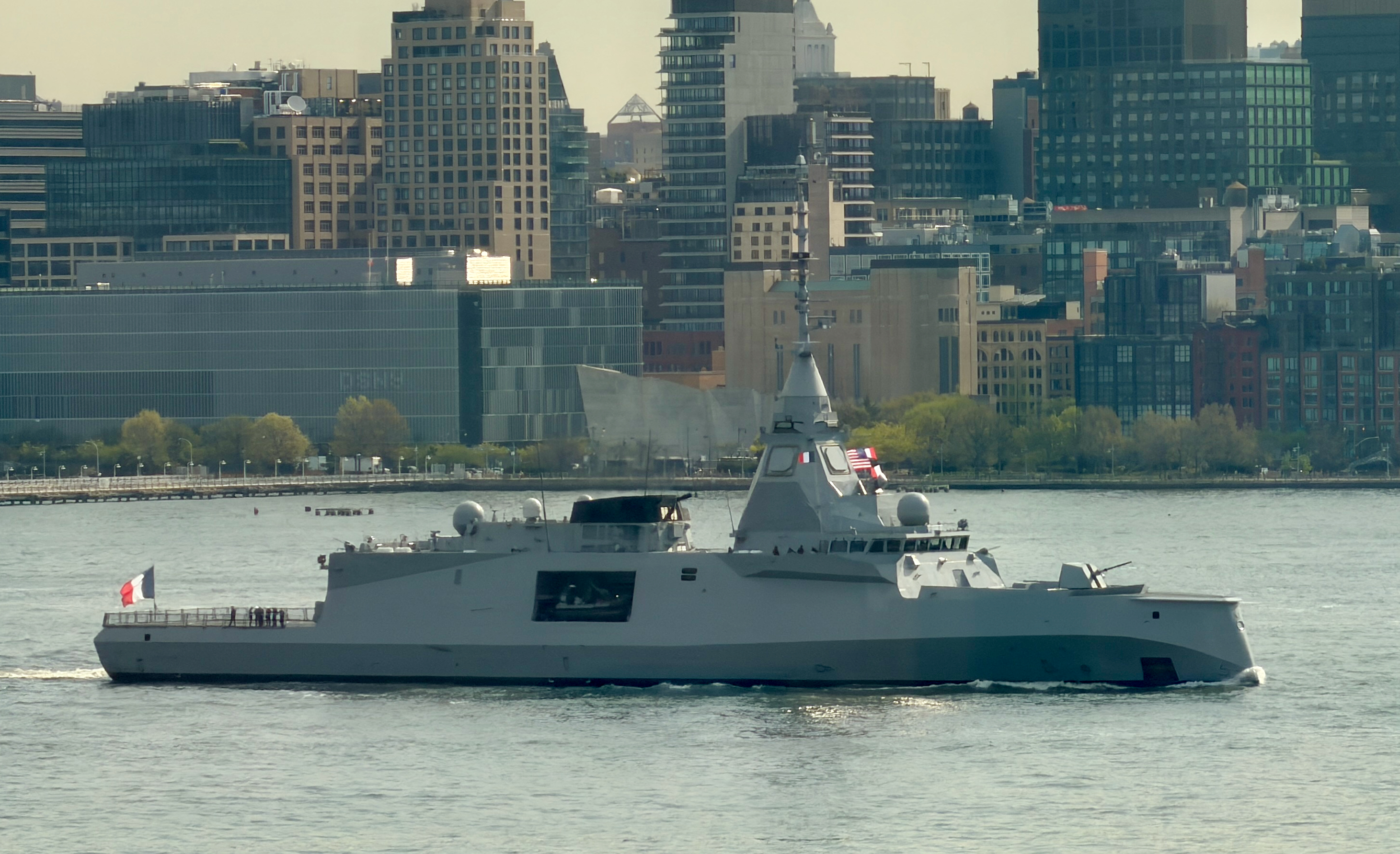
- Amiral Ronarc'h in New York during its Atlantic deployment in April 2026

Class overview
- Name: Frégate de Défense et d'Intervention (FDI)
- Builders: Naval Group, Lorient shipyard; Salamis Shipyards
- Operators: French Navy; Hellenic Navy; Swedish Navy
- Preceded by: Aquitaine class (FN); La Fayette class (FN); Elli class (HN); Hydra class (HN); Visby class (SN)
- Subclasses: Kimon class (HN); Luleå class (SN)
- Cost: 5 × Amiral Ronarc'h class (FN): (Note: The FN orders the weapons separately.); Construction cost for 5 units: €2.1 billion (2017) (equivalent to €2.5 billion in 2025); Total cost (including development costs): €3.5 billion (2017) (equivalent to €4.2 billion in 2025); 4 × Kimon class (HN): (Note: Three ships ordered in September 2021 for a cost of €3 billion (2021) (equivalent to €3.4 billion in 2025). Fourth ship ordered in November 2025 for a cost of €982 million (2025) .); 3 × €3 billion (2021) (equivalent to €3.4 billion in 2025); 1 × €982 million (2025); 4 × Luleå class (SN): €4.3 billion (2026) (Note: Unit cost of €1.1 billion (2026) , 4 ships ordered in total.)
- Built: 2019–present
- In service: From 2025
- In commission: From 2025 (Hellenic Navy)
- Planned: 13 (5 × FN, 4 × HN, 4 × SN)
- Building: 7 (4 × FN, 2 × HN, 1 × SN)
- Completed: 2 (1 x FN, 2 x HN)

General characteristics
- Type: General-purpose frigate
- Displacement: 4,460 t (4,390 long tons)
- Length: 122 m (400 ft 3 in)
- Beam: 17.7 m (58 ft 1 in)
- Installed power: Mechanical power 32 MW (43,000 shp)
- Propulsion: CODAD (Combined diesel and diesel): 2 × 2 MTU 16V 8000 M91L (each line driving two shafts fitted with controllable-pitch propellers via reduction gearboxes)
- Speed: Maximum: 27 knots (50 km/h; 31 mph)
- Range: 5,000 nmi (9,300 km; 5,800 mi) at 15 knots (28 km/h; 17 mph)
- Endurance: 45 days
- Complement: 125 (+ 28 passengers)
- Sensors & processing systems: Systems: Naval Group Setis® 3.0 Combat Management System; Sonars: Thales CAPTAS-4 Compact variable depth, towed array sonar; Thales KingKlip Mk2 hull-mounted sonar; Radars: Thales Sea Fire (3D, S-band (IEEE), AESA, GaN, 4 × panel fixed array) multi-function radar; Thales STIR 1.2 EO Mk2 medium- and long-range tracking radar system for gunfire control; Thales BlueGate E-scan IFF system; E/O / IR sensors: Safran PASEO XLR extra long-range EO/IR and FCS system; Bertin Technologies 360° TV/IR camera surveillance system; Communications: Thales SURFSAT-L SATCOM terminal with Syracuse IV satellite link; Thales Aquilon digital communication system; Navigations: Terma SCANTER X-band navigation radar; Wärtsilä NACOS X-band navigation radar; iXblue Marins inertial navigation system; iXblue Netans navigation data distribution system
- Electronic warfare & decoys: Thales Sentinel-R-ESM system; Thales ALTESSE-H C-ESM / COMINT system; Naval Group CMLS with CANTO anti-torpedo decoys
- Armament: Naval guns: 1 × Oto Melara 76 mm Super Rapid gun (in stealth cupola); 2 × Nexter Narwhal 20B 20 mm RWS; Anti-ship missiles; 2 × 4-cell Exocet MM-40 Block 3c; Air defence missiles: French frigates 1-2 (as built): 2 × 8-cell Sylver A50 VLS for 16 Aster 15 or 30 ; 4 × 8-cell after retrofit in the 2030s; French frigates 3-5 (as built): 4 × 8-cell Sylver A50 VLS for 32 Aster 15 or 30; Torpedoes: 2 × twin torpedo tubes for MU90 Impact
- Aircraft carried: 1 NH90 or H160M Guépard helicopter; 1 Unmanned Air Systems: Camcopter S-100 or SDAM
- Notes: Electric generation: 6 × 500 kWe EMS-Scania gensets (V8 diesel) (+1 for emergency)

The Amiral Ronarc'h-class frigate is a new class of French frigates to complement the Aquitaine class. The program is known as Frégate de Défense et d'Intervention (English: Defence and Intervention Frigate) or FDI, formerly denominated Frégate de Taille Intermédiaire (English: Medium-Size Frigate) or FTI. The programme was launched in 2015 to produce the class. As of February 2022, five ships have been ordered for the French Navy. Amiral Ronarc'h, the lead ship of the class, was commissioned in 2026. In 2021, three units were ordered by Greece for the Hellenic Navy and form the Kimon class. Amiral Ronarc'h, the lead ship of the class, was laid down on 17 December 2021. Commissioning of the warship had been planned from 2024 onwards but it was subsequently reported that delays in the fitting out and sea trials would push that date, as well as its entry into full service of the first French vessel, into 2027.

== Development ==
The Intermediate-size Frigate (FTI) program was a response to the requirement for fifteen first-class frigates to allow the French Navy to operate in a crisis zone, as recommended in the White Paper on Defense and National Security of 2013. This would see the five FTI ships join the ten FREMM multipurpose frigates (Aquitaine class) and Horizon class.

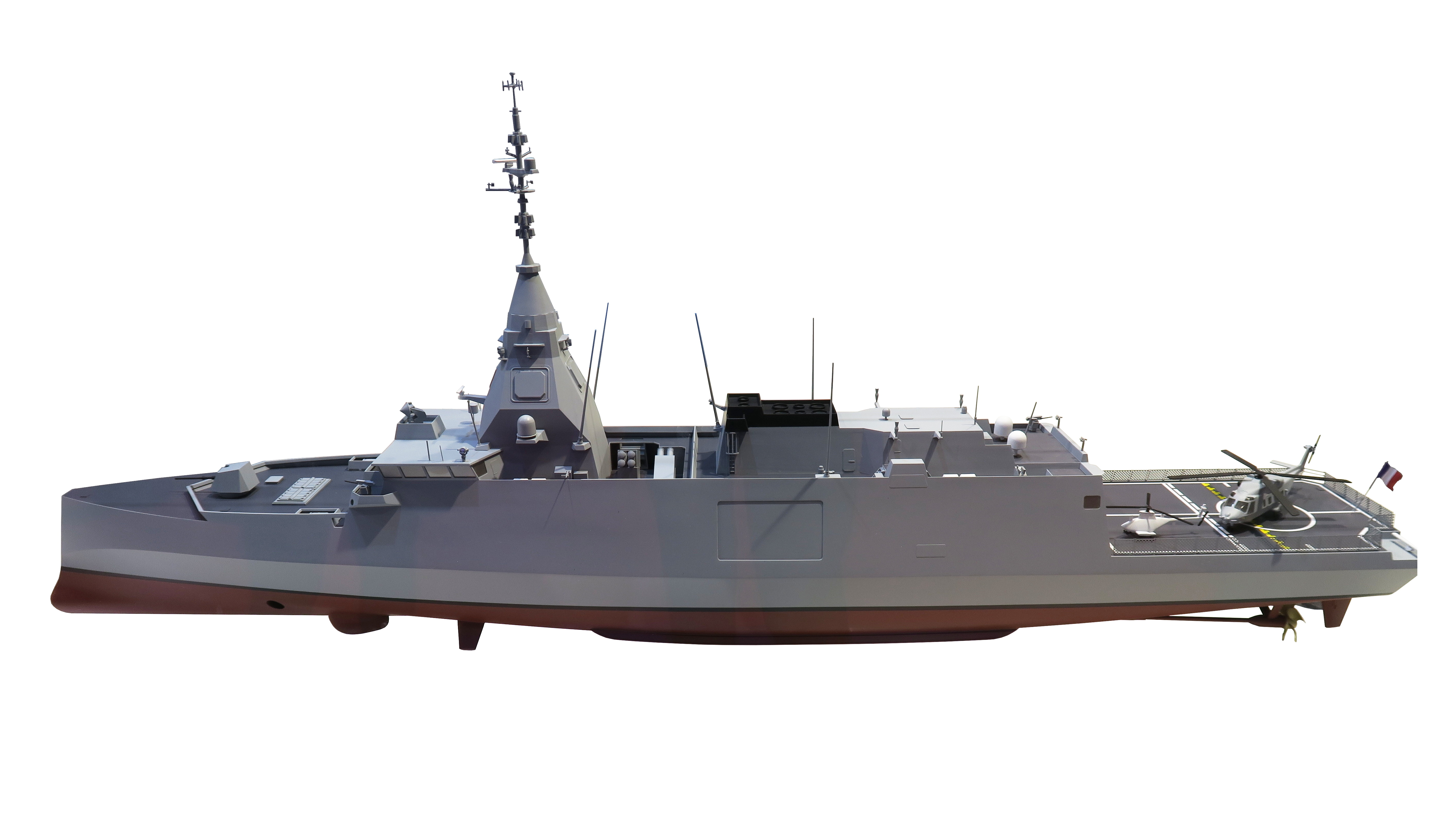
2016 model of a Frégate de défense et d'intervention.

Defence Minister Jean-Yves Le Drian announced the launch of the five-ship program on 29 May 2015 at the naval aviation base in Lann-Bihoué. In 2021 it was reported that work on the second and third frigates in the series would be accelerated with first steel cut for modules of the second ship of the class envisaged for October.

The FTIs, of a contained size, would better correspond to the demands of the export markets according to the Direction générale de l'armement (DGA; English: Directorate General of Armaments) and also make it possible to maintain the development and production capacities of the French shipyards.

These ships will incrementally supersede the La Fayette-class frigates, in the role of first rank frigates, replacing all five frigates of that class by 2035. In the interim, a modernization of three vessels in the La Fayette class is being undertaken to extend their useful lives into the early 2030s. In November 2022 it was announced that the first two FDI frigates (Amiral Ronarc'h and Amiral Louzeau) would be based at Brest.

The FDI will have significant anti-aircraft capabilities with active antenna radar and fixed planes, anti-submarine capabilities (helicopter and towed sonar), and will have a displacement of 4,000 to 4,500 tonnes (3,900 to 4,400 long tons). In 2025, Yannick Chenevard, a member of the National Defence and Armed Forces Committee responsible for the navy budget, indicated that the fourth and fifth French navy FDIs would incorporate enhanced capabilities including 32 Aster surface-to-air missile silos instead of 16 (this objective was later expanded also to incorporate the third ship in the class). This expansion in air defence capability will also be retroffited into the first two French frigates in the 2030s, and that all vessels of the class would receive 2 × 2 Sadral Mistral Simbad-RC point defence SAM (either fit from build or retrofit at a later date) to help deal with the rising threat posed by drones.

The French Defence Ministry announced the award of a contract to DCNS for the development and construction of five intermediate-size frigates (FTIs) intended for the French Navy on 21 April 2017. The frigates will be equipped with electronic systems and sensors developed by Thales and Aster 30 missiles.

- The SEA FIRE fully digital multi-function radar with four fixed antennas, which will meet the requirements of a broad range of missions, from ship self-defence to extended air defence, and can deploy MBDA Aster 15/30. The first SEA FIRE radar was delivered for integration in the first frigate in April 2021.
- The compact version of the CAPTAS-4 towed-array sonar, delivers the same ultra-long-range detection performance as the original version of CAPTAS-4 with 20% lower weight and a footprint almost 50% smaller.
- The Aquilon integrated digital communications system and an IFF (Identification Friend or Foe) associated with the SEA FIRE radar.
- The SENTINEL system, an advanced digital electronic warfare system built around a modular architecture.

The FDI was one of the four final contenders under evaluation by the Royal Norwegian Navy (RNoN) as replacements for its Fridtjof Nansen-class frigates. The RNoN intended to buy five vessels (with an option to purchase a sixth). In August 2025, Norway instead decided to purchase five Type 26 frigates, to be manufactured in the UK.

== Exports ==
=== Confirmed exports ===
==== Greece ====
In September 2021, Greece signed an agreement with France's Naval Group to purchase three FDI HN frigates with an option for one more for the Hellenic Navy as part of a $5 billion defence package. The FDI HN export version is also known as the Belharra-class frigate.

It was reported that the Hellenic Navy ships would carry a more extensive weapons fit, capable of carrying up to 32 Aster-30 air defence missiles. This will permit the Hellenic Navy to operate three ships with 32 air defence missiles plus 21 point defence missiles in a Mk31 21-cell launcher of RAM Block 2B surface-to-air missiles, 8 Block 3 Exocet anti-ship missiles, 2 dual launchers MU90 torpedoes and SYLENA Mk1 decoy launching systems (DLS) for CANTO anti-torpedo decoys. Two of the vessels, destined for the French Navy in 2025, now will be delivered to the Hellenic Navy. The date of the construction agreement was anticipated to be at late 2021 or early 2022.

In December 2021 it was reported that an agreement for construction had been signed by France and Greece with the actual contract for the construction of the ships having been signed on 24 March 2022. In February 2022, documents released by the Greek Parliament indicated that initially the first two frigates for the Hellenic Navy would be equipped similar to their French counterparts in a "Standard-1" configuration (with 16 Sylver A50 cells). By 2027 the two ships would be upgraded to a "Standard-2" configuration with 32 A-50 cells as well as with the RAM Block 2B. The third Hellenic Navy frigate would be built from the outset in the "Standard-2" configuration.

According to the Hellenic Navy, the ships will be named after three great ancient Greek admirals: Cimon (Greek: Κίμων, romanized: Kimon), Nearchus (Νέαρχος, Nearchos) and Phormio (Φορμίων, Formion). These names had previously been used for the ex-US Charles F. Adams-class destroyers in service with the Hellenic Navy from 1991 to 2004.

Since 2022, 70 contracts have been signed with Greek companies participating in the frigates' construction, involving vessels for both the Greek and French navies. In addition to other contracts, contracts concerning construction of pre-outfitted blocks in Salamis Shipyards and shipment to France for assembly, start from the third Greek frigate and involve both Greek and French frigates. In May 2025, a MoU was signed with Hellenic Aerospace Industry on integrating the latter's counter-unmanned aircraft systems (C-UAS) aboard the frigates.

In 2024 it was decided to adjust the production sequence by reassigning the fourth and fifth vessels in the production series. The fourth vessel (the previous Amiral Louzeau - D661), previously assigned to France, would instead be allocated to Greece, while the fifth ship in the series (the previous Formion - F603), previously assigned to Greece, would be destined for the French Navy instead. Each vessel would be renamed accordingly. It was unclear how this reallocation might impact the original intent to have the third Greek FDI built in an enhanced "Standard-2" configuration.

PN1 (F601 Kimon) delivered in a "hybrid" Standard 2 (essentially Standard 1 with the systems installed but not activated) on 18 December 2025 in France. It will become Standard 2 and 2+, two years later on 31 October 2027 and Standard 2++ on 30 September 2029 all in Greece. PN2 (F602 Nearchos) delivered in full Standard 2 on 30 October 2026 in France. It will become Standard 2+ on 31 January 2028 and Standard 2++ on 30 April 2029 in Greece. PN3 (F603 Formion) will be delivered in full Standard 2+ on 30 April 2027 in France and will become Standard 2++ on 30 June 2029 in Greece. PN4 (F600 Themistokles) will be delivered in full Standard 2+ on 31 December 2028 in France and will become Standard 2++ on 31 March 2030 in Greece.

==== Sweden ====
The Swedish Navy is planning to acquire four new surface combatants focused on air-defence and anti-submarine warfare between 2030-2035. The initial plan was for the so-called Luleå-class frigate to be a clean sheet design by Saab, but due to the aggressive timeline for getting the ships into service an "off the shelf" purchase is now being considered. In June 2025 France and Sweden signed a defence cooperation roadmap which positioned the FDI frigate as a contender for the Luleå class. The Swedish Defence Material Administration (FMV) later confirmed that it was evaluating the potential procurement of ships from several different suppliers. In May 2026, Sweden announced that they will purchase FDI frigates with a planned delivery starting in 2030. The contract was signed the 31 August 2026.

Although the ships will be built by Naval Group in France, they will be fitted with many Swedish weapon systems and sensors like Saab RBS 15 anti-ship missile, SLWT torpedo, Giraffe 1X radar and Trackfire remote weapon station, together with BAE systems Bofors 57 and 40 mm naval guns. They will also be armed with MBDA CAMM-ER missiles. They will also be serviced and maintained in Sweden.

=== Potential exports ===
==== Denmark ====
The Danish Navy is planning to acquire three new surface combatants focused on air-defence. In January 2026, the French Navy paid a marketing visit in Copenhagen.

==== Indonesia ====
On 22 May 2024, Naval Group held a seminar in Jakarta to Indonesian defence officials on board French frigate Bretagne to which Naval Group gave a presentation of the frigate and how the frigate necessarily fulfill's the needs of the Indonesian Navy with options to be locally built by PAL Indonesia. Chief of Staff of the Indonesian Navy Muhammad Ali visited Naval Group's shipyard witnessing the construction of Amiral Ronarc'h on 17 May 2024 and commented that the frigate may be an option for the Indonesian Navy to be acquired.

== Ships ==
No.	Name	Builder	Status	Contract	Steel cut	Laid down	Launched	Comm.	Notes
Marine Nationale Amiral Ronarc'h class (5 ordered)
D660	Amiral Ronarc'h	Naval Group, Lorient, France	Sea trials (post acceptance)	Apr 2017	24 Oct 2019	17 Dec 2021	7 Nov 2022	Spring 2027	Delivered 17 Oct 2025.
D661	Amiral Louzeau	Naval Group, Lorient, France	Fitting out	29 Mar 2021	12 Jul 2023	Autumn 2024	16 May 2026	2027	
D662	Amiral Castex	Naval Group, Lorient, France	Under construction	29 Mar 2021	4 Oct 2024	–	–	2029 / 2030	
D663	Amiral Nomy	Naval Group, Lorient, France	On order	24 Dec 2025	–	–	–	2031	
D664	Amiral Cabanier	Naval Group, Lorient, France	On order	31 Mar 2026	–	–	–	2032	
Hellenic Navy Kimon class (4 ordered)
F-601	Kimon	Naval Group, Lorient, France	In service	24 Mar 2022	Dec 2021	21 Oct 2022	28 Sep 2023	15 Jan 2026	Launch ceremony on 4 Oct 2023. Delivery and Greek flag raised on 18 Dec 2025..
F-602	Nearchos	Naval Group, Lorient, France	Sea trials since 4 Feb 2026	24 Mar 2022	13 Jul 2022	Late 2023	19 Sep 2024	30 Nov 2026	Delivery and Greek flag raised on 30 Oct 2025.
F-603	Formion	Naval Group, Lorient, France	Sea trials since 22 Jun 2026	24 Mar 2022	12 Jul 2023	15 Apr 2024	4 Jun 2025	Apr 2027	Planned to deliver the ship and see the Greek flag raised on 17 Dec 2026.
F-600	Themistokles	Naval Group, Lorient, France	Under construction	14 Nov 2025	30 Jun 2025	–	–	Dec 2028	
Swedish Navy Luleå class (4 on order)
TBD	Luleå	Naval Group, Lorient, France	Under construction	31 Aug 2026	1 Oct 2026	–	–	2030	
TBD	Norrköping	Naval Group, Lorient, France	On order	31 Aug 2026	–	–	–	2032	
TBD	Trelleborg	Naval Group, Lorient, France	On order	31 Aug 2026	–	–	–	2033	
TBD	Halmstad	Naval Group, Lorient, France	On order	31 Aug 2026	–	–	–	2034	

Planned dates

NOTE: The French Navy does not use the term "destroyer" but rather classifies these vessels as "first-rate frigates". Nevertheless, they are identified with the NATO "D" designation which ranks them in the destroyer class, instead of ranking them with an "F" designation as frigates. As of 2023, all French warships are having their hull numbers removed in order to reduce the ability to identify individual ships.

== Operational history ==
The FDI saw its first operational deployment during the 2026 Iran war. In March 2026, the Hellenic Navy dispatched its first ship of the Kimon class, Kimon along with the Hydra-class frigate Psara and two pairs of F-16 fighter jets of the Hellenic Air Force to Cyprus, in order to provide air defence against Iranian drone attacks.

== Gallery ==
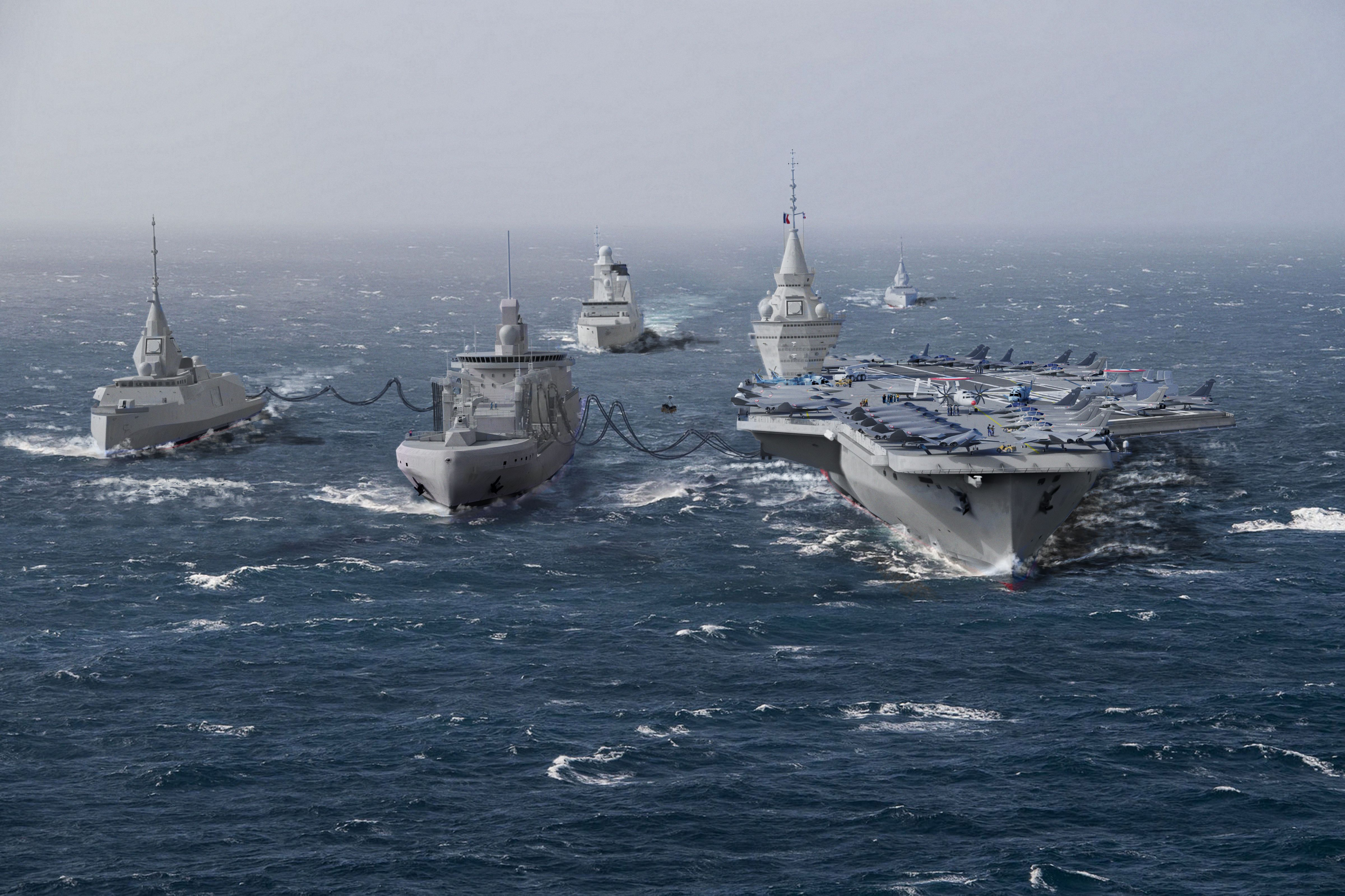
The FDI in planned French Navy of the late 2030s: a Bâtiment ravitailleur de forces conducts simultaneous underway replenishment with the PA-NG nuclear aircraft carrier and with a Frégate de défense et d'intervention.

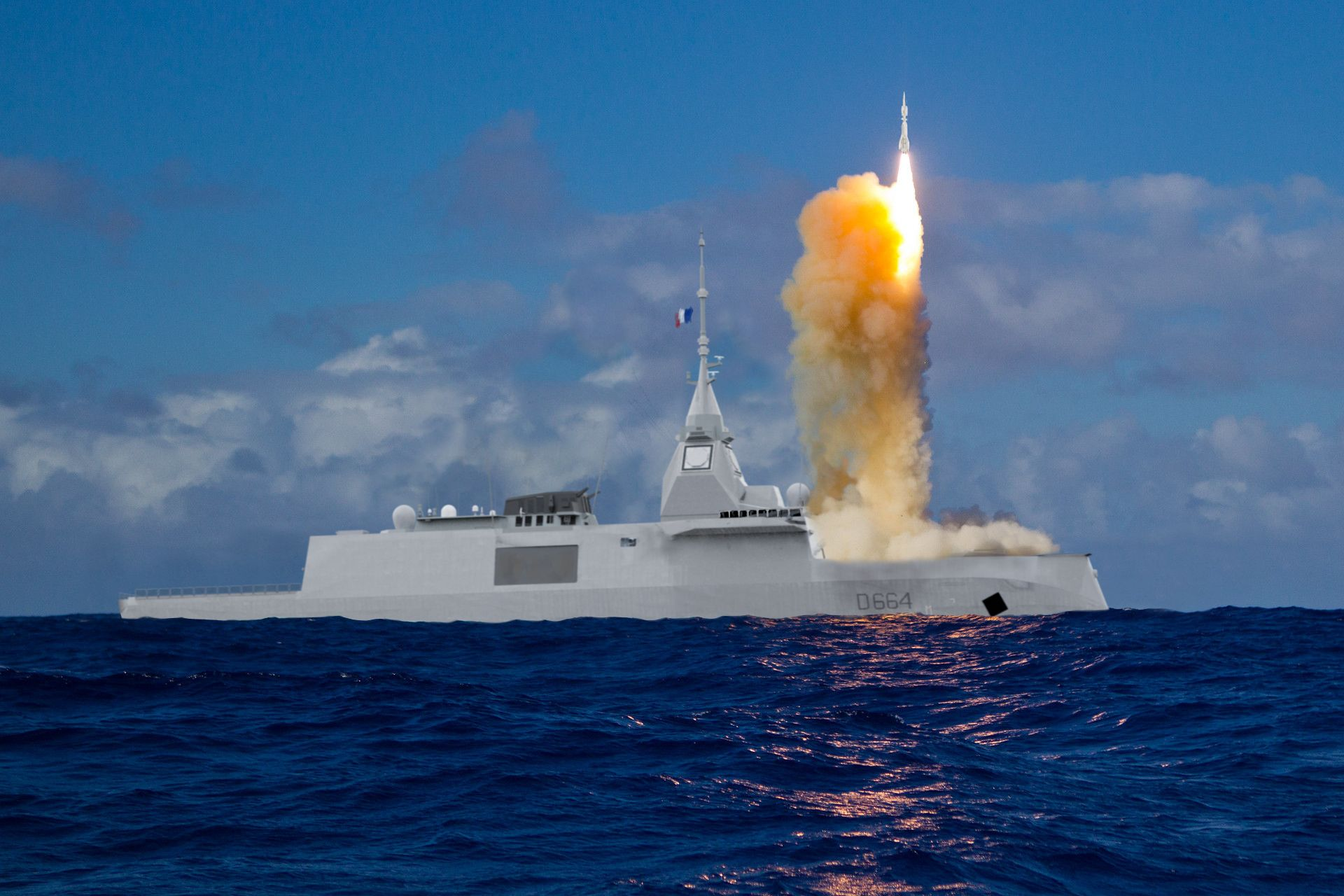
Computer-generated image of a launch of an Aster-30 missile.

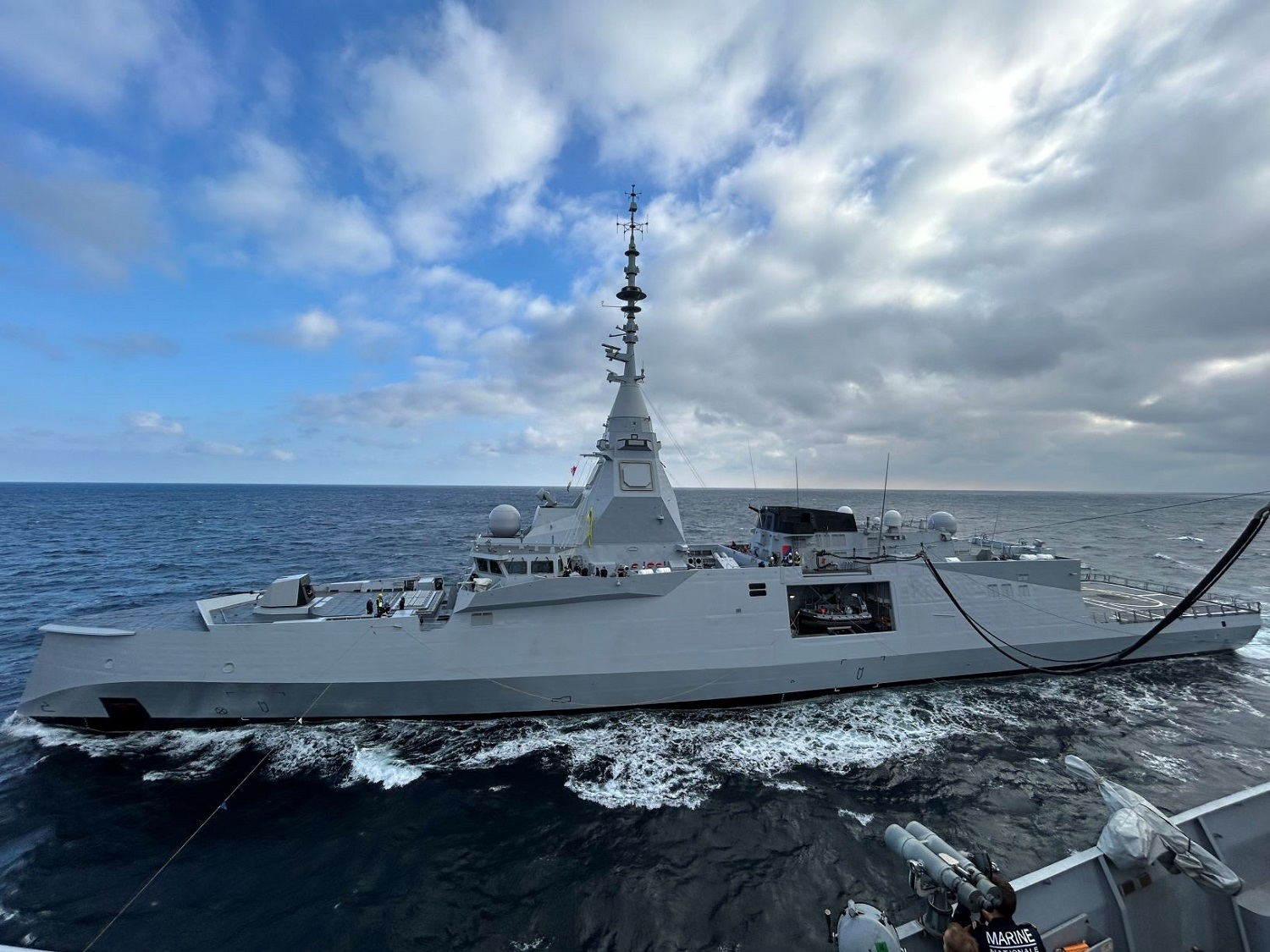
Replenishment at sea (RAS) of the Amiral Ronarc'h, 2025.

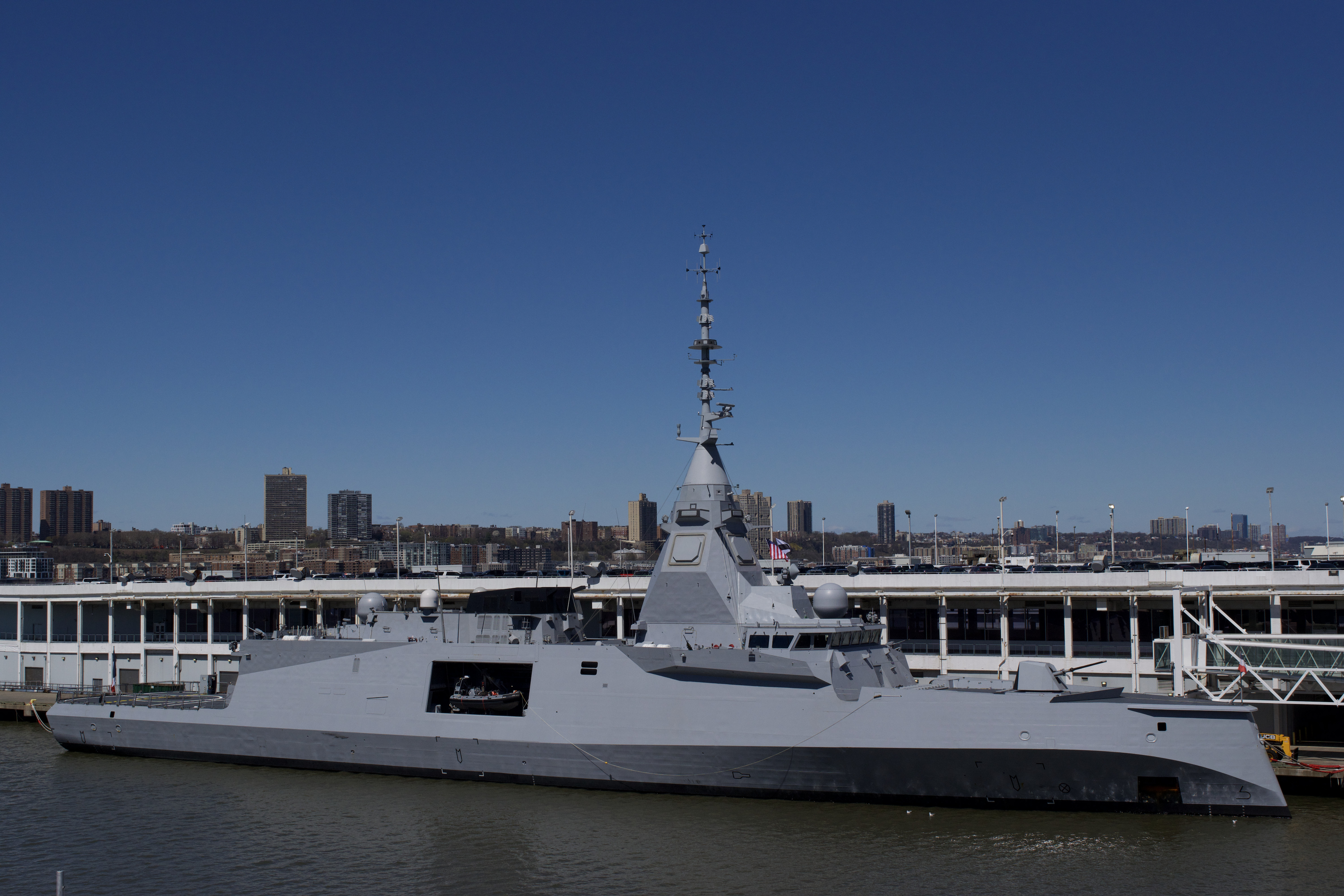
FDI frigate Amiral Ronarc'h docked in New York, 2026.

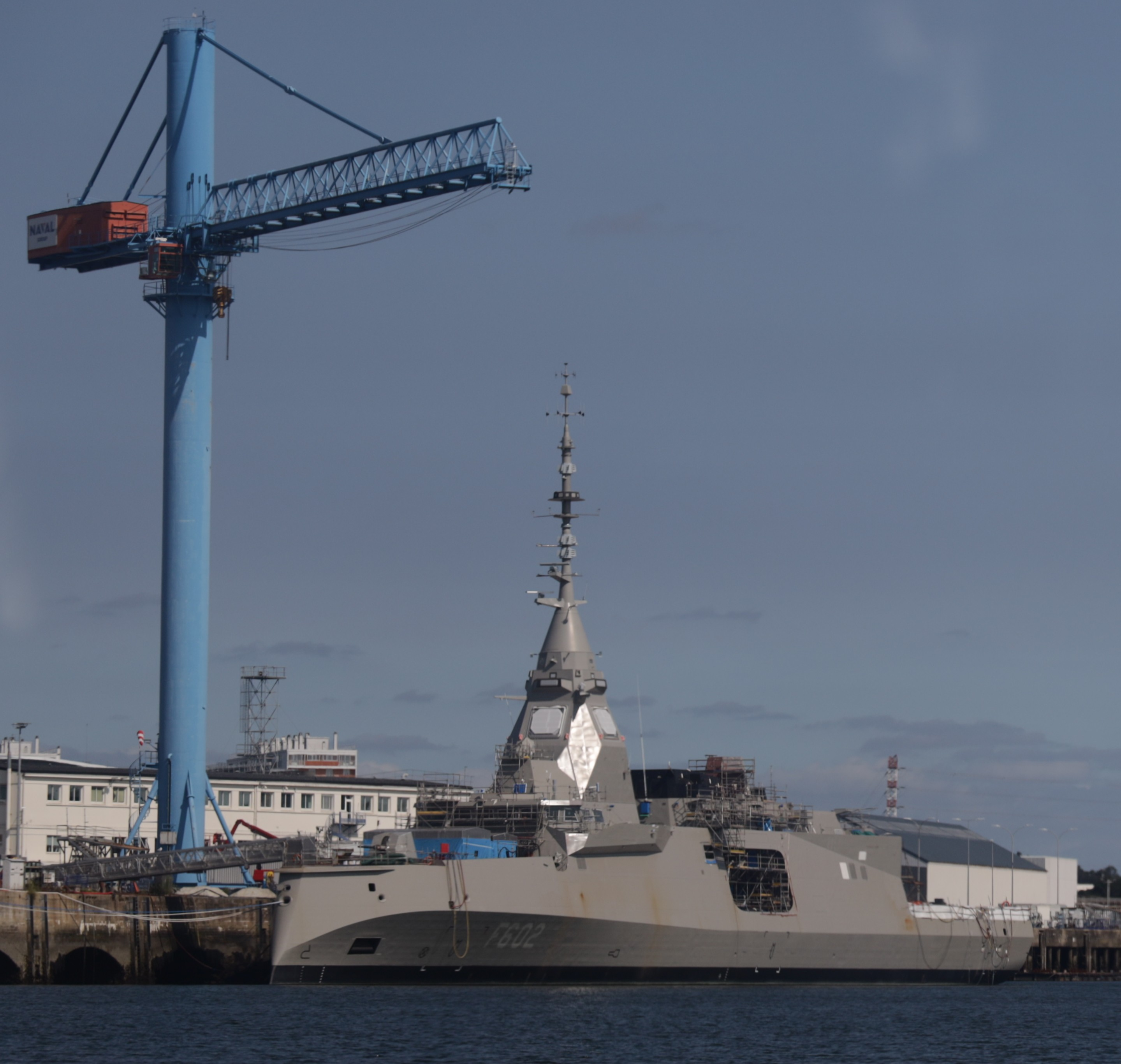
FDI Nearchos under construction in Lorient.

== See also ==
- Future of the French Navy

=== Equivalent modern general purpose frigates ===
- Istanbul class
- F128 class frigate
- Thaon di Revel class
- Type 31 Inspiration class
- Mogami class
  - Upgraded Mogami class
- Chungnam class
- Tamandaré class
- Formidable class
- Pohjanmaa class
