= Emmanuel Chiva =

French Delegate General for Armaments

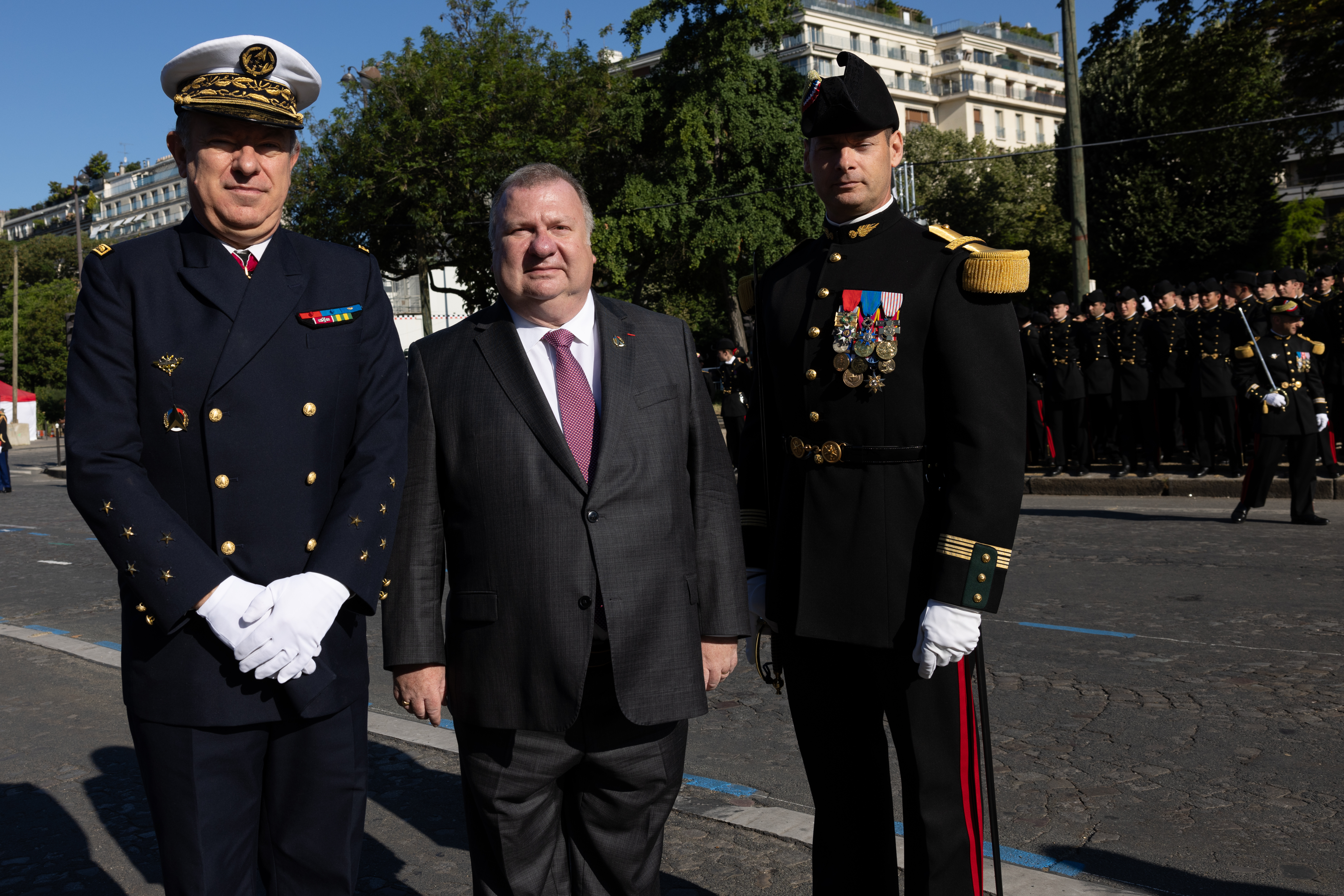
- July 14, 2024 military parade for the École Polytechnique Class of X23

Delegate General for Armaments
- Incumbent
- Assumed office 31 July 2022
- Preceded by: Joël Barre

Personal details
- Education: École normale supérieure
- Occupation: Senior civil servant, biomathematician
- Awards: Knight of the Legion of Honour

Military service
- Rank: Naval captain

Emmanuel Chiva (born 17 June 1969, Paris) is a French senior civil servant. An alumnus of the École normale supérieure, with a doctorate in biomathematics and experience as an entrepreneur, he has served since 31 July 2022 as the Délégué général pour l’armement (Chief Executive of the French Defence Procurement Agency), after previously heading the Defence Innovation Agency (Agence de l’innovation de défense) of the French Ministry of the Armed Forces from 1 September 2018 to 30 July 2022.

== Education and training ==
Born in Paris in 1969, Emmanuel Chiva was educated at the École alsacienne.

After completing preparatory classes at the Lycée Saint-Louis, he entered the École normale supérieure de Fontenay–Saint-Cloud (class of 1989).

During his studies, he spent several periods at Harvard University in the United States, focusing on epistemology and immunology.

He earned a doctorate in biomathematics from the University of Paris VI – Pierre and Marie Curie, with a specialization in artificial intelligence, complex systems, and biomimetics.

Later, in 2013–2014, he attended the 49th national session Armement et économie de défense of the Institut des hautes études de défense nationale (IHEDN), before serving for three years as an academic advisor to the institute.

== Professional career ==
=== Business executive and entrepreneur ===
He began his career in 1997 at MASA (Mathématiques appliquées SA), a company then specializing in applied mathematics, robotics and biology. There he served as deputy managing director and later executive vice-president, while founding and developing the “military simulation” division, notably through the real-time strategy game Conflict Zone, produced with Ubisoft in 2001. That same year, the company also developed SCIPIO, a command-post training system for the French Army.

In 2007, he co-founded the company SILKAN, of which he was a partner. The firm specialized in high-performance computing, embedded technologies and simulation.

From April 2015 to August 2018, he was deputy managing director in charge of strategy and development at AGUERIS, a company spun off from SILKAN and subsidiary of CMI Defence (now John Cockerill Defence), specializing in operational simulation and training for weapons system operators.

=== Roles in professional associations ===
In parallel with his professional activities, between 2014 and 2018 he served as chairman of the Research, Technology and Innovation Committee of GICAT, the French Land Defence and Security Industry Association.

== Ministry of Armed Forces ==
=== Director of the Defence Innovation Agency ===
On 1 September 2018, he was appointed by Minister of the Armed Forces Florence Parly as director of the Defence Innovation Agency (AID), which he was tasked with establishing in order to conduct strategic foresight activities. Parly described him at the time as “the right man for the job: he knows defence, he knows business, he knows innovation, and he has an inexhaustible drive to undertake.”

As the first director of the AID, described as an “institutional innovation,” he set up the agency as a “one-stop shop” for innovation within the Ministry of the Armed Forces, structuring relations between the armed forces, the DGA and the wider innovation ecosystem.

With an initial budget of €720 million, which exceeded €1 billion by 2022, the agency became an interface for identifying “hidden gems,” selecting and supporting innovation projects from both civilian and military sources, in fields such as artificial intelligence, quantum computing, hypersonics and neuroscience.

==== Red Team Défense ====
Under the impetus of Emmanuel Chiva, the Defence Innovation Agency launched the Red Team Défense in 2019, an unprecedented strategic foresight initiative. Inspired by science fiction, it brought together writers, screenwriters, researchers and military experts to imagine future threats in the 2030–2060 horizon. Its aim was to confront the French armed forces with radical scenarios — technological disruptions, hybrid warfare or societal upheavals — in order to inform strategic thinking and capability choices. Conceived as a “writers’ room” integrated into the Ministry of the Armed Forces’ reflection, the Red Team produced three seasons of exploratory scenarios, some of which were published. Presented as a world first in the field of defence, it illustrated cooperation between military, scientific and cultural communities.

Since 2024, the “RADAR” programme has succeeded the Red Team Défense, bringing together actors from diverse backgrounds to anticipate threats and develop appropriate responses.

=== Delegate General for Armaments ===
On 22 July 2022, he was appointed by the Council of Ministers as Délégué général pour l’armement (Delegate General for Armaments), effective 1 August 2022

At the head of an administration of more than 10,000 people, half of them engineers, he is responsible for coordinating, in conjunction with the armed forces, all French armament programmes — including nuclear — in order to support and guide the Defence Industrial and Technological Base (BITD).

In the context of modern geostrategic constraints, and in particular Russia’s war of aggression against Ukraine, he has been one of the main actors in implementing the “war economy” advocated by the President of the Republic Emmanuel Macron.

In this capacity, while supporting innovation and French technological sovereignty, he has worked to accelerate production rates, particularly for munitions and key equipment, and to reduce delays in armament processes. He has initiated efforts to simplify technical specifications, rationalize costs, strengthen subcontracting with SMEs and mid-sized companies, and develop public-private partnerships to reinforce industrial responsiveness and resilience.

== Military officer ==
Emmanuel Chiva is also a reserve capitaine de vaisseau (naval captain) in the French Navy, which he joined in 2007. He has worked on issues related to technological innovation, notably artificial intelligence, for the Navy General Staff.

== Honours ==
- Knight of the Legion of Honour (14 July 2019)
- Aeronautical Medal (2 January 2023)
- Medal for Voluntary Military Service

== Other activities ==
In 2015, Emmanuel Chiva created the blog VMF214, dedicated to technological innovation in defence, which he maintained until he took up responsibilities within the Ministry of the Armed Forces.

== Personal life ==
Emmanuel Chiva is married and has one child. He is particularly passionate about photography and science fiction.

== Publications and research work ==
=== 2020s ===
- (fr) Emmanuel Chiva and Jean-Baptiste Colas, Défendre notre souveraineté: innover ou périr, Revue de la Défense Nationale, February 2022.
- (fr) Emmanuel Chiva, Yvon Erhel and Emmanuel Gardinetti, Le soldat augmenté: Nouvelles technologies au service de l’augmentation des performances du combattant, Défense & Sécurité Internationale, December 2021.
- (fr) Emmanuel Chiva, preface to La guerre à ciel ouvert by Valéry Rousset, Éditions Decoopman, December 2020.
- (fr) Emmanuel Chiva, postface to Innover en plein chaos by Jean-Baptiste Colas, Éditions Nuvis, February 2020.

=== 2010s ===
- (fr) Emmanuel Chiva, L’Intelligence Artificielle: un moteur de l’innovation de défense française, Revue de la Défense Nationale, May 2019.
- (fr) Emmanuel Chiva, Capturer l’innovation de défense: à la découverte de DIUx, Revue Défense & Industries, June 2018.
- (fr) Emmanuel Chiva, Nouvelles technologies et art de la guerre, Questions internationales, April 2018.
- (fr) Emmanuel Chiva, Innovation technologique de défense: ruptures et convergences, Revue Défense & Industries, June 2016.
- (fr) Emmanuel Chiva and Pierre Fiorini, En mesure de … et prêt à…! La simulation et l’entraînement au plus près de l’opérationnel, Revue CAIA, June 2014.
- (fr) Emmanuel Chiva, Comment soutenir et encourager l’innovation technologique de défense en période de réduction des budgets et avec des ressources limitées en Europe et aux États-Unis?, IHEDN AED, in collaboration with the Dwight D. Eisenhower School for National Security and Resource Strategy.
- (fr) Emmanuel Chiva and Philippe Langloit, SCORPION: ce que la simulation va apporter, Défense & Sécurité Internationale, April 2013.
- (fr) Emmanuel Chiva, Jeu Vidéo et Simulation: l’âge de maturité?, Doctrine tactique: revue d'études générales, 2012.

=== 2000s ===
- (fr) Emmanuel Chiva and Richard Roll, Connaître et anticiper: l'apport de la simulation haute performance, Revue de la Défense Nationale, January 2009.
- (fr) Emmanuel Chiva and Richard Roll, Simuler les «hyper-crises», Revue de la Défense Nationale, October 2007.
- (fr) Emmanuel Chiva and Frédéric Morinière, Tout ce qui n’est pas guerre est simulation, Revue de la Défense Nationale, June 2006.
- Emmanuel Chiva, Jérôme Comptdaer and David Bourguignon, A new microscopic approach to crowd modelling applied to urban crisis management training, Behavior Representations in M&S – BRIMS, 2005.
- Emmanuel Chiva, Stéphane Delorme, Stéphane Maruejouls and David Bourguignon, Adaptive Motivational Agents: A new technology for multi-level behaviour simulations, TESI 2005 – Innovation for Human Performance Excellence, 2005.
- Emmanuel Chiva and Pascal Cantot, Transitioning Technologies From Videogames To Wargames: the DirectIA Case, Proceedings of the NATO Modelling & Simulation Group Workshop on Exploitation of Commercial Games for Military Use, The Hague, 2004.
- Emmanuel Chiva and Stéphane Delorme, The Performance of Motivational Command Agents in a Command Post Training Simulation, Conference on Behaviour Representation in Modelling and Simulation (BRIMS), 2004.
- Emmanuel Chiva, Julien Devade, Jean-Yves Donnart and Stéphane Maruéjouls, Motivational Graphs: A New Architecture for Complex Behaviour Simulation, in Rabin, S. (Ed.), AI Game Programming Wisdom 2, Charles River Media, 2003.
- Emmanuel Chiva and Jean-Yves Donnart, An Integrated Platform for Military Simulation Based on the DirectIA Kernel: Tactical Exercise Reconstruction Results, in NATO RTO Meeting Proceedings, Future Modelling and Simulation Challenges, 2002.
- (fr) Emmanuel Chiva, Jean-Yves Donnart and P. Chavannat, Apport de la théorie des systèmes complexes pour la simulation opérationnelle, Proceedings of the International Symposium on Information Superiority, Tools for Crisis & Conflict Management, French Air Naval and Aerospace Association, 2001.

=== 1990s ===
- Emmanuel Chiva, Philippe Tarroux and Nabil Hassoumi, A neural model of preattentional and attentional visual search, Vision Research, 1997.
- (fr) Emmanuel Chiva, Une approche connexionniste et génétique des interactions génotype-phénotype… (doctoral thesis, University Paris VI – Pierre and Marie Curie), 1996.
- Emmanuel Chiva and Philippe Tarroux, Modelling the emergence of coregulated proteins in biological regulation networks, in Computation in Cellular and Molecular Biological Systems, World Scientific Publishing, 1996.
- Emmanuel Chiva and Philippe Tarroux, Evolution of Biological Regulation Networks Under Complex Environmental Constraints, Biological Cybernetics, vol. 73, September 1995.
- Emmanuel Chiva and Philippe Tarroux, Studying Genotype-Phenotype Interactions: a Model of the Evolution of the Cell Regulation Network, Proceedings of the International Conference on Evolutionary Computation, PPSN-III, Lecture Notes in Computer Science no. 866, Springer-Verlag, 1994.
