= Aster (missile family) =

Franco-Italian surface-to-air missile family

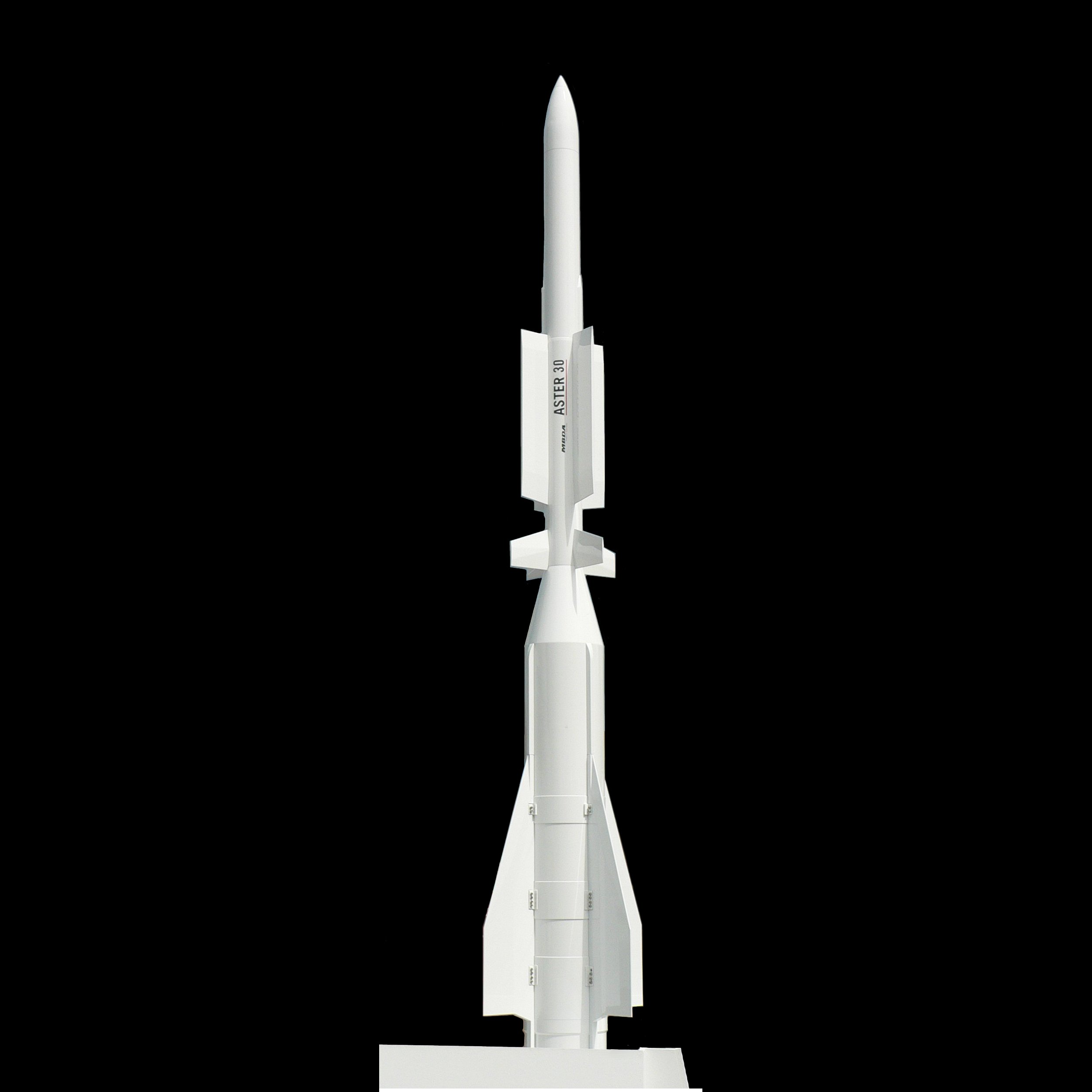
- MBDA Aster 30 on display showing attached booster
- Type: Surface-to-air/anti-ballistic missile
- Place of origin: France; Italy

Service history
- In service: 2001–present
- Used by: See Operators

Production history
- Manufacturer: Eurosam

Specifications
- Mass: Aster 15: 310 kg Aster 30: 450 kg
- Length: Aster 15: 4.2 m Aster 30: 4.9 m
- Diameter: Aster 15 & 30: 180 mm (7.1 in)
- Warhead: 15 kg focused fragmented warhead with 2 m lethal radius
- Detonation mechanism: Calculated delay proximity fuze
- Engine: Solid propellant, two-stage motor
- Operational range: Aster 15: >30 km Aster 30 Block 0 & 1: >120 km Aster 30 Block 1 NT: >150 km
- Flight altitude: Aster 15: 13 km Aster 30 Block 0 & 1: 20 km Aster 30 Block 1NT: 25 km class
- Maximum speed: Aster 15: Mach 3 (1,000 m/s); Aster 30: Mach 4.5 (1,400 m/s)
- Guidance system: Inertial guidance with up-link; Active RF seeker
- Launch platform: Maritime platforms (PAAMS); Land-based platforms (SAMP/T)

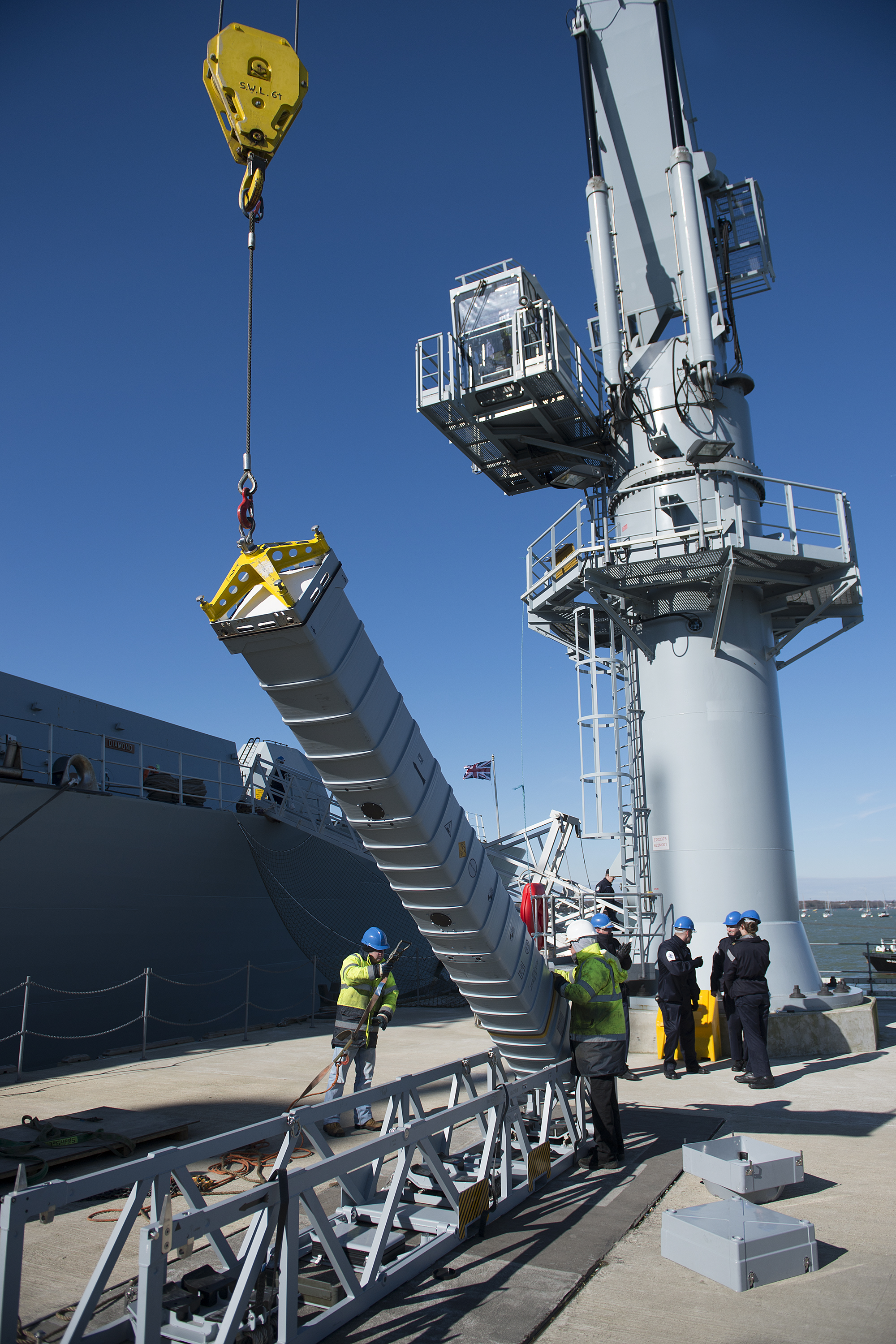
Loading onto HMS Diamond

The Aster 15 and Aster 30 are a Franco-Italian family of all-weather, vertical launch surface-to-air missiles. The name "Aster" stands for "Aérospatiale Terminale", with French company Aérospatiale having been the project's lead contractor before its missile activities were merged into MBDA. It also takes inspiration from the word "aster" (Greek: ἀστήρ), meaning "star" in Ancient Greek. The missiles as well as the related weapon systems are manufactured by Eurosam, a consortium consisting of MBDA France, MBDA Italy and Thales, each holding a 33.3% share.

The Aster missiles were developed to intercept and destroy the full spectrum of air threats from high-performance combat aircraft, UAVs and helicopters to cruise, anti-radiation and even sea-skimming supersonic anti-ship missiles. The Aster 30 Block 1 and Block 1 NT are designed to also counter ballistic missiles.

The Aster is primarily operated by France and Italy, as well as the United Kingdom as an export customer, and is an integrated component of the PAAMS air defence system, known in the Royal Navy as Sea Viper. As the principal weapon of the PAAMS, the Aster equips the Horizon-class frigates in French and Italian service as well as the British Type 45 destroyers. It equips the French and Italian FREMM multipurpose frigates, though not through the PAAMS air defense suite itself but specific French and Italian derivatives of the system.

== History ==
During the 1980s, the predominant missiles in Franco-Italian service were short-range systems such as the French Crotale, Italian Selenia Aspide or American Sea Sparrow, with ranges up to a dozen kilometres. Some vessels were also equipped with the American medium/long range RIM-66 Standard. France and Italy decided to start development of a domestic medium/long range surface-to-air missile to enter service in the first decade of the 21st century, that would give them comparable range but superior interception capability to the American Standard or British Sea Dart already in service.

Thought was given in particular to the new missile's ability to intercept next-generation supersonic anti-ship missiles, such as the BrahMos missile developed jointly by India and Russia. This allowed the actual systems to have the characteristic of being specialised either in short-to-medium range "point defence" for e.g. ships, or in medium-to-long range "zone defence" of fleets.

In May 1989, a memorandum of understanding was signed between France and Italy for the development of a family of future surface-to air-missiles. Eurosam was formed shortly afterwards. By July 1995 development had taken shape in the form of the Aster missile, and test firing of the first Aster 30 took place. The missile successfully intercepted a target at an altitude of 15,000 m (49,000 ft) and at speeds of 1,000 km/h (620 mph). A Phase 2 contract was awarded in 1997 at US$1 billion for pre-production and development of the French-Italian land and naval systems.

During development trials between 1993 and 1994 all flight sequences, altitudes and ranges, were validated. This was also the period during which the launch sequence of Aster 30 was validated. In May 1996, trials of the Aster 15 active electromagnetic final guidance system against live targets began. All six attempts were successful. During 1997 Aster was extensively tested, this time being pitted against targets such as the Aerospatiale C.22 target and first generation Exocet anti-ship missiles.

In numerous engagements Aster scored direct impacts on its targets. During an engagement in November 1997 in a strong countermeasures environment, the Aster was not armed with its military warhead, so that the distance between the Aster and the target could be recorded. The target, a C22, was recovered bearing two strong cuts made by the fins of the Aster missile.

In May 2001, Aster again completed the "manufacturer's validation firing test". It was deployed for the first time on the French nuclear-powered aircraft carrier Charles de Gaulle. In June 2001, the Aster achieved a successful interception of an Arabel missile at low altitude in less than five seconds. In 2001, a target simulating an aircraft flying at speeds of Mach 1 and at an altitude of 100 m (330 ft) was intercepted by an Aster 15. The first ever operational firing of the Aster missile took place during October 2002 on board Charles de Gaulle.

In November 2003, Eurosam was awarded the 3 billion euro Phase 3 production contract. Full production and exports to France, Italy, Saudi Arabia and the United Kingdom started. The resulting Aster surface-to-air missile meets inter-service and international requirements, addressing the needs of the land, air and naval forces of France, Italy and the United Kingdom. The decision to base the missile around a common terminal intercept "dart" to which different sized boosters can be attached, has made it modular and extensible.

From 2002 to 2005, the Italian experimental frigate Carabiniere provided a test bed for live firing trials of the Aster 15 from Sylver A43 launchers with EMPAR and SAAM-it systems, and the trials of Aster 30 from Sylver A50 launchers with EMPAR and PAAMS(E) systems. As of 2012, France had spent €4.1bn at 2010 prices on 10 SAMP/T launchers, 375 Aster 30 missiles and 200 Aster 15 missiles. Another 80 Aster 30 and 40 Aster 15 were purchased for France's Horizon-class frigates under a separate programme.

In January 2023, the Italian and French Minister of Defense signed with MBDA a $2 billion contract for the purchase of 700 Aster missiles.

In January 2026, the Royal Navy began to study the feasibility of integrating Aster-30 into the Mk41 VLS.

== Characteristics ==
There are two versions of the Aster missile family, the short-medium range version, the Aster 15, and the long range version, the Aster 30. The missile bodies are identical. Their difference in range and intercept speed is because Aster 30 uses a much larger booster. Total masses of the Aster 15 and Aster 30 are 310 kg (680 lb) and 450 kg (990 lb) respectively.

The Aster 15 is 4.2 m (13 ft 9 in) long, rising to just under 5 m (16 ft 5 in) for the Aster 30. Aster 15 has a diameter of 180 mm (7.1 in). Given the larger dimensions of the Aster 30, a naval-based system requires the longer tubes of the Sylver A50 or A70 vertical launching system (VLS). The American Mark 41 Vertical Launching System can accommodate Aster 30.

=== Variants ===
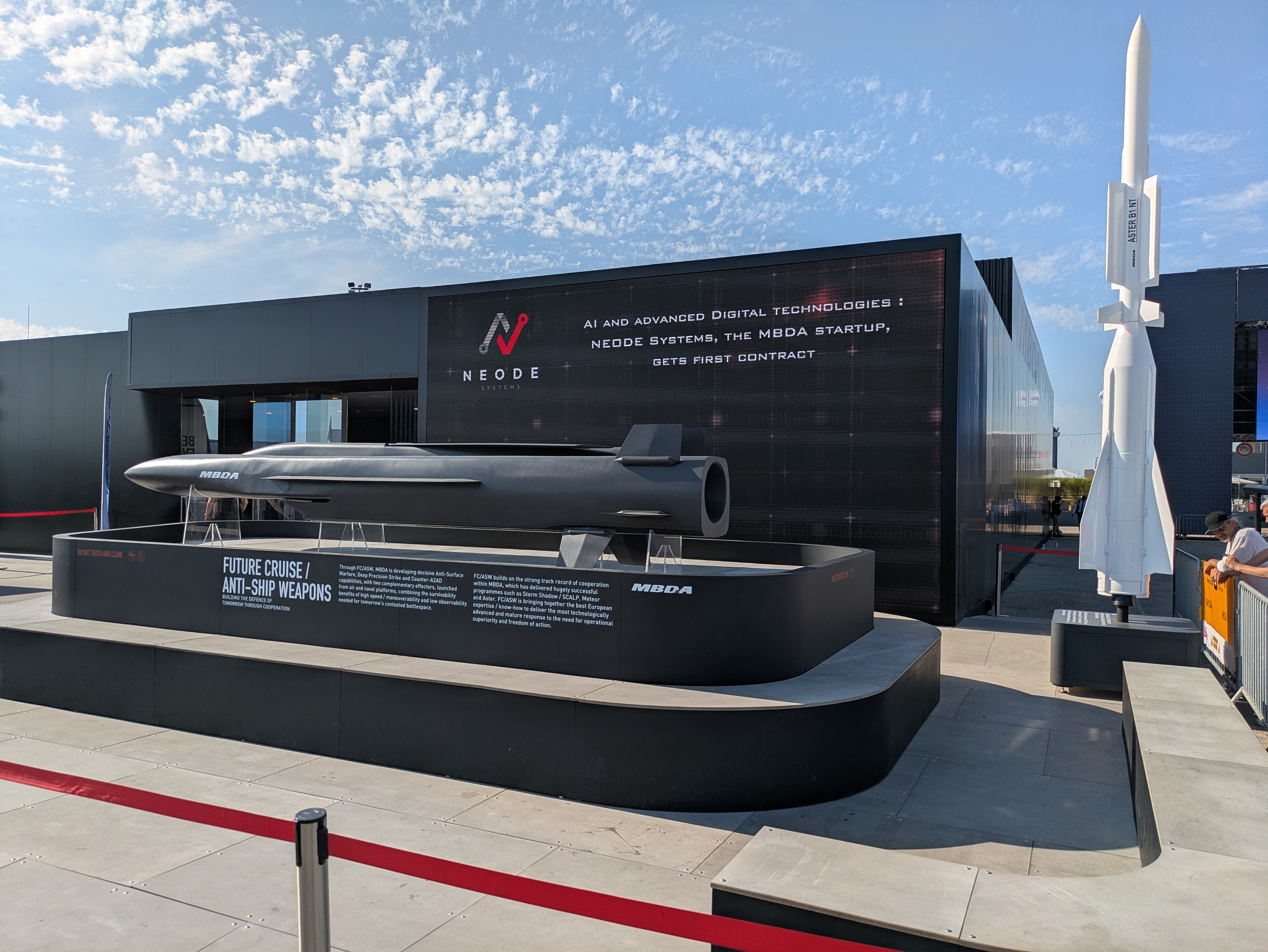
Aster 30 Block 1NT shown on the right.

- Aster 15: Short- to medium-range surface-to-air missile
- Aster 15 EC: New version of the Aster 15 with twice the range (>60 km); under development as of 2023 and expected to be introduced in 2030
- Aster 30 Block 0: Medium- to long-range surface-to-air missile. It can pull manoeuvres in excess of 50g.
- Aster 30 Block 1: Variant with anti-ballistic missile capability; tailored to counter 600 km (370 mi)-class short-range ballistic missiles.
- Aster 30 Block 1NT: NT standing for "New Technology", it is a new variant of the Aster 30 designed to counter short and 1,500 km (930 mi)-class medium-range ballistic missiles.
- Aster 30 Block 2 BMD: Anti-ballistic missile under development and intended to counter up to 3,000 km (1,900 mi)-class ballistic and maneuvering missiles. Following a lack of information surrounding the variant, development is considered to have ceased.

The Aster 30 Block 1 is used on the Eurosam SAMP/T system operated by the French Air and Space Force and the Italian Army. In 2015, France launched the development of the Block 1NT variant, a programme Italy would join in 2016. The same year, the United Kingdom showed interest in acquiring the Block 1NT version for its Type 45 destroyers currently operating the Block 0. In 2022, the United Kingdom announced a series of upgrades to its Type 45 destroyers. This included the implementation of the Block 1 version for anti-ship ballistic missile defense.

== Production ramp-up ==
In December 2024, during a hearing before the French National Assembly, the Delegate General for Armament, Emmanuel Chiva, announced a significant increase in annual production of Aster missiles, across all variants (Aster 15, Aster 30, Aster 30 B1NT). Whereas the production forecast for 2025 had originally been capped at 32 missiles, a "tiger team"—a tightly coordinated group involving the DGA, industry and the military staff—has enabled a ramp-up to an estimated 80–100 units. The stated objective is to reach a sustained production rate of over 300 Aster missiles per year by 2028.

On 13 July 2026, France and Ukraine signed an agreement that would allow it to manufacture under licence Aster air defence missiles.

== Deployment ==
=== Naval systems ===
==== French Navy ====
Current ships:

- 1 × French aircraft carrier Charles de Gaulle (4 × Sylver A43 with 8 × Aster 15 each)
- 2 × Horizon-class frigate (6 × Sylver A50 with 8 × Aster 15 / Aster 30 each)
- 4 × Aquitaine-class frigate (FR-ASW) (2 × Sylver A43 with 8 × Aster 15 each, 2 × Sylver A70 with up to 8 × Aster 30 each)
- 2 × Aquitaine-class frigate (FR-ASW) (2 × Sylver A50 and 2 × Sylver A70 with up to 8 × Aster 15 / Aster 30 each)
- 2 × Aquitaine-class frigate (FR-AAW) (4 × Sylver A50 with up to 8 × Aster 15 / Aster 30 each)

Future ships:

- 3 × Amiral Ronarc’h class (FDI) (2 × Sylver A50 with up to 8 × Aster 15 / Aster 30 each)
- 2 × Amiral Ronarc’h class (FDI) (4 × Sylver A50 with up to 8 × Aster 15 / Aster 30 each)
- 1 × French aircraft carrier France Libre

==== Italian Navy ====
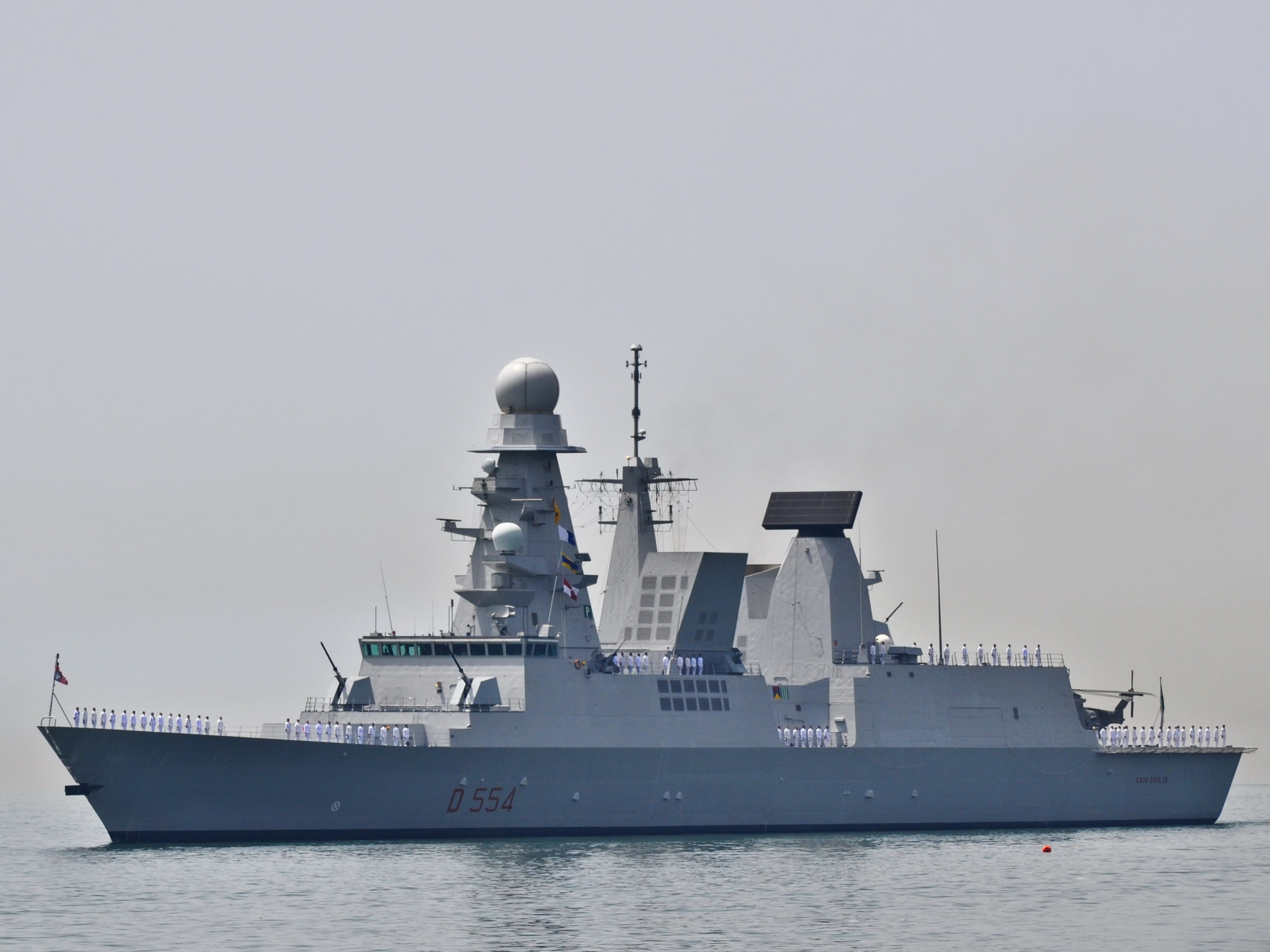
Italian Horizon-class frigate, Caio Duilio equipped with Aster 15 and 30 missiles

Current ships:

- 1 × Italian aircraft carrier Cavour (4 × Sylver A43 with 8 × Aster 15 each)
- 1 × Italian landing helicopter dock Trieste (2 × Sylver A50 with up to 8 × Aster 15 / Aster 30 each)
- 2 × Orizzonte-class destroyer (6 × Sylver A50 with 8 × Aster 15 / Aster 30 each)
- 4 × Bergamini-class frigate (IT-GP) (2 × Sylver A50 with 8 × Aster 15 / Aster 30 each)
- 4 × Bergamini-class frigate (IT-ASW) (2 × Sylver A50 with 8 × Aster 15 / Aster 30 each)
- 2 × Bergamini-class frigate (IT-GP-e) (2 × Sylver A50 with 8 × Aster 15 / Aster 30 each)
- 7 × Thaon di Revel-class offshore patrol vessel (2 × Sylver A70 with 8 × MdCN / Aster 15 / Aster 30 each)

Future ships:

- 2 × DDX guided missile destroyer (12 × Sylver A50 and A70 with 8 × Aster 15 / Aster 30 each)
- 2 × Bergamini class frigate (IT-FREMM-EVO) (2 × Sylver A50 with 8 × Aster 15 / Aster 30 each + 1 × Sylver A70 with 8 × Aster 15 / Aster 30)
- 2 × Thaon di Revel-class offshore patrol vessel (2 × Sylver A70 with 8 × MdCN / Aster 15 / Aster 30 each)
- 8 × MMPC class (1 × Sylver A50 with 8 × Aster 15 / Aster 30 each)

==== Royal Navy (UK) ====
Current ships:

- 6 × Type 45-class destroyer (6 × Sylver A50 with 8 × Aster 30 each) Note: Type 45s are under refit for silos to launch 24 × CAMM missiles, which replace the Aster 15 in their role, and thus the Sylver A50 cells may be equipped with only Aster 30 missiles.

==== Algerian National Navy ====
Current ships:

- 1 × Algerian amphibious transport dock Kalaat Béni Abbès (2 × Sylver A50 with 8 × Aster 15 each)

==== Egyptian Navy ====
Current ships:

- 1 × Aquitaine-class frigate (FR-ASW) (2 × Sylver A43 with 8 × Aster 15 each)
- 2 × Bergamini-class frigate (IT-GP) (2 × Sylver A50 with 8 × Aster 15 / Aster 30 each)

==== Hellenic Navy ====
Current ships:

- 1 × Kimon-class frigate (FDI-class) (3 × Sylver A50 with 8 × Aster 15 / Aster 30 each)

Future ships:

- 3 × Kimon-class frigate (FDI-class) (3 × Sylver A50 with 8 × Aster 15 / Aster 30 each)
- 1 × Bergamini-class frigate (IT-GP) (2 × Sylver A50 with 8 × Aster 15 / Aster 30 each)
- 1 × Bergamini-class frigate (IT-ASW) (2 × Sylver A50 with 8 × Aster 15 / Aster 30 each)

==== Moroccan Navy ====
Current ships:

- 1 × Moroccan frigate Mohammed VI (FREMM FR-ASW) (2 × Sylver A43 with 8 × Aster 15 each)

==== Qatari Navy ====
Current ships:

- 1 × Qatari amphibious transport dock Al Fulk (2 × Sylver A50 with 8 × Aster 30 each)
- 4 × Al Zubarah-class frigate (2 × Sylver A50 with 8 × Aster 30 each)

==== Republic of Singapore Navy ====
Current ships:

- 6 × Formidable-class frigate (La Fayette-class) (2 × Sylver A43 with 8 × Aster 15 each and 2 × Sylver A50 with 8 × Aster 30 each)

Future ships:

- 6 × Victory class (evolved arrowhead class) (2 × Sylver A50 with 8 × Aster 15 / Aster 30 each and 2 × Sylver A70 with 8 × Aster 30 each)

==== Royal Saudi Naval Forces ====
Current ships:

- 3 × Al Riyadh-class frigate (La Fayette-class) (2 × Sylver A43 with 8 × Aster 15 each)

=== Land systems ===
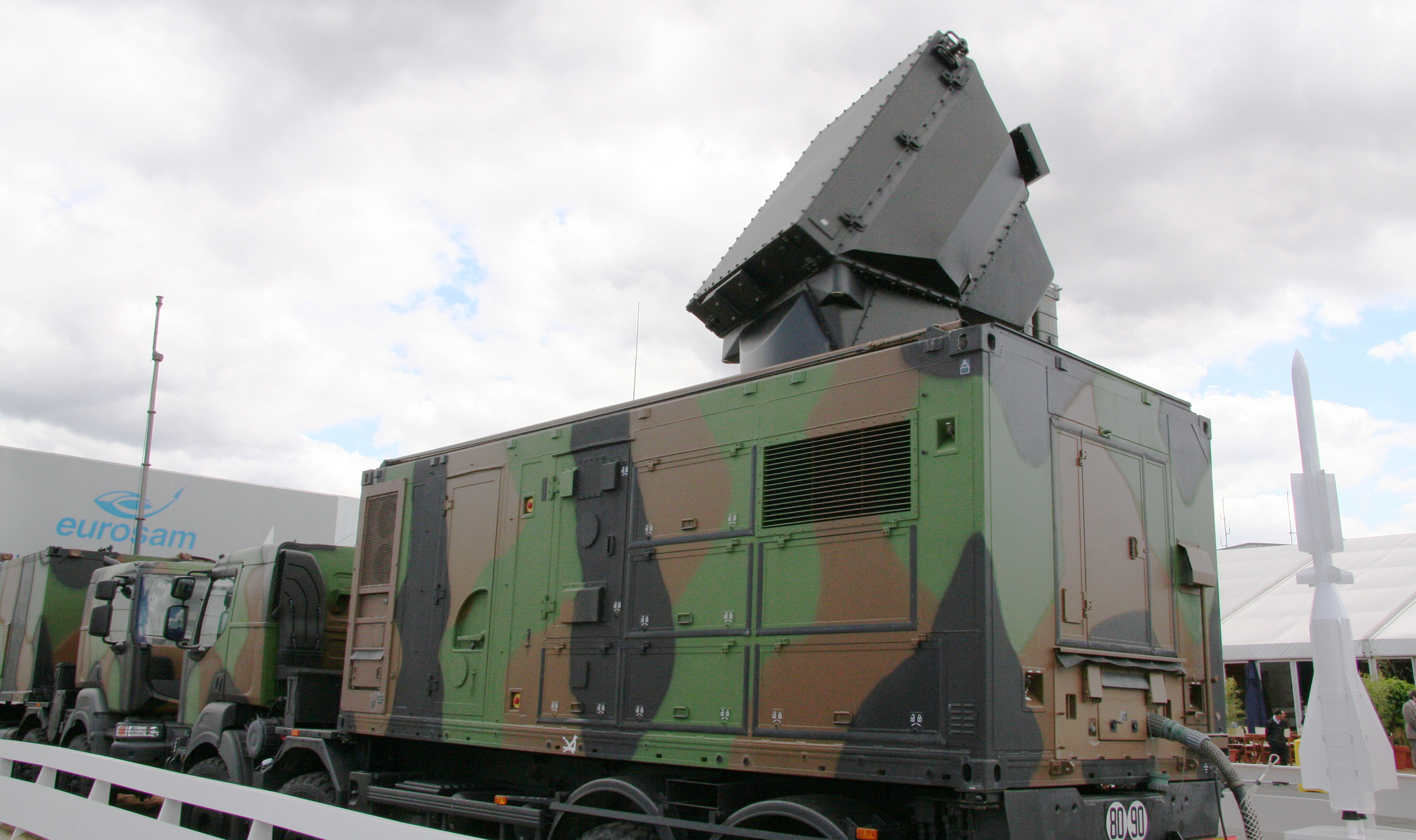
The "radar module" (featuring the Arabel) of the SAMP/T ground-based air defence system

The Aster 30 has been incorporated by Eurosam into a mobile HIMAD system, fulfilling the ground-based theatre air defence/protection requirement. It comes in the form of the Sol-Air Moyenne-Portée/Terrestre (French for "Surface-to-Air Medium-Range/Land-based"), commonly known as SAMP/T. The system uses a network of radars and sensors, enabling it to be effective against various air threats such as aircraft, tactical ballistic missiles, standoff missiles, cruise missiles or anti-radiation missiles.

The SAMP/T originally used an upgraded version of the aging Arabel 3D phased array radar, developed under the Aster 30 Block 1 upgrade program, and later the Ground Master 200 3D AESA radar, in order to extend the system's capability against higher speed and higher altitude targets. The Aster 30 Block 1 can intercept 600 km (370 mi)-range (short-range ballistic missiles).

The SAMP/T was further developed into the SAMPT/NG in the face of new and ever-increasing threats. The system notably features vastly superior radar performance with new-generation radars (Thales' Ground Fire 300 AESA radar in French service and Leonardo's Kronos Grand Mobile High Power in Italian service), extended engagement ranges and a fully digitized command architecture, and now enables a multi-layer air defense integration (such as linking with short-range VL MICA and VL MICA NG air defense systems). The SAMP/T NG integrates the enhanced Aster 30 Block 1 NT interceptor, meant to significantly boost its capability against complex, high-speed, and maneuvering ballistic/hypersonic threats. It is expected to be delivered from 2025 onwards.

== Operational history ==
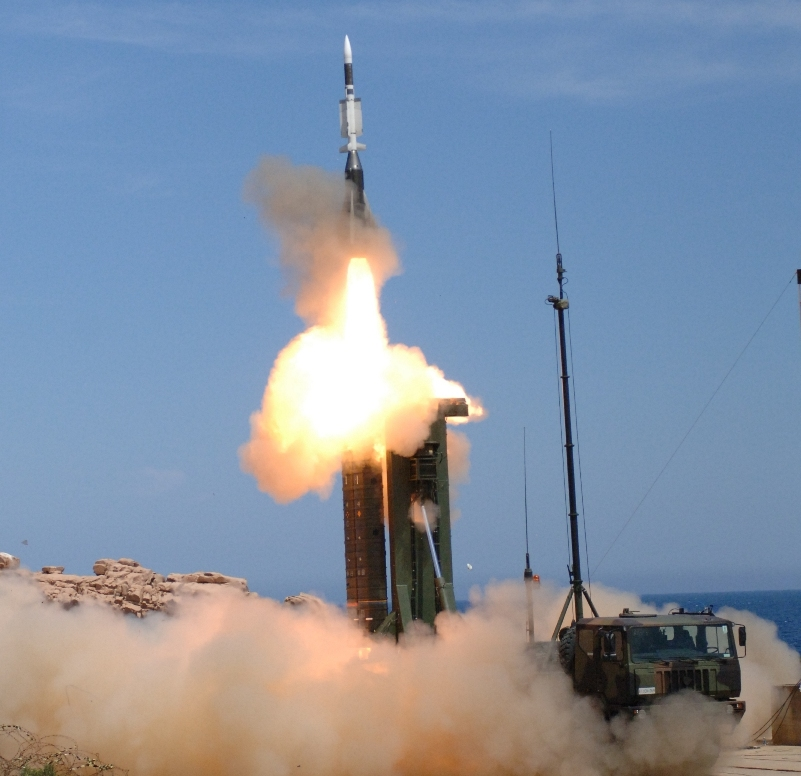
Italian Army – 4th Anti-aircraft Artillery Regiment "Peschiera" firing a SAMP/T Aster missile

=== Testing ===
- In April 2008, RSS Intrepid, a Formidable-class frigate of the Republic of Singapore Navy, shot down an aerial drone off the French port of Toulon during a naval exercise. Then again in 2010, a frigate of the same class, RSS Supreme fired an Aster 15 and shot down an aerial drone off the coast of Hawaii as part of exercise RIMPAC 2010. The RSN conducted 6 successful live-firings of the Aster missile over 11 years.
- Beginning with HMS Dauntless in September 2010, all of the Royal Navy's Type 45 destroyers have successfully intercepted Mirach drones with Aster missiles at the Benbecula ranges off the Outer Hebrides, Scotland. Mirach is a 13 ft (4.0 m) jet which flies at speeds of up to 600 mph (970 km/h) at altitudes as low as 10 ft (3.0 m) or as high as 39,000 ft (12 km).
- In December 2011, an Aster 30 missile downed an Israeli Black Sparrow ballistic missile target, the first time an Aster missile had attempted such an engagement.
- In April 2012, the Horizon-class frigate, Forbin, of the French Navy downed a target simulating a sea-skimming supersonic anti-ship cruise missile flying at an altitude of less than 5 metres. It was the first time a European missile defence system destroyed a supersonic sea-skimming missile. The trial was described as a complex operational scenario.
- In 2021, during the Exercise At-Sea Demo: Formidable Shield 2021, the Horizon-class frigate Forbin, intercepted a supersonic sea skimming target flying at more than 3000 km/h using an Aster 30 missile.
- In Oct 2025, French frigate Alsace shot down a modified MICA air to air missile launched by the Rafale M jet using an Aster 30 missile.

=== Russian invasion of Ukraine ===
In May 2023, Italian newspaper La Stampa reported that France and Italy had jointly delivered a SAMP/T air defense system to Ukraine. In June 2024, Foreign Minister Antonio Tajani announced that Italy would be sending a second SAMP/T system to Ukraine. The date of arrival was not announced. On 11 March 2025, Ukrainian Air Force Colonel Yurii Ihnat claimed that the SAMP/T had downed a Russian Sukhoi military aircraft, among other targets. He did not provide any further details. In March 2025, according to the Corriere della Sera, Ukraine had practically run out of Aster missiles and was asking Italy and France for replenishment.

=== Red Sea crisis ===
In 2024, during Operation Aspides, it is likely that the French Navy utilised Aster 30 to intercept three Houthi ballistic missiles. The missile was also likely used by the Royal Navy to down another Houthi ballistic missile in April 2024.

== Operators ==
Current operators

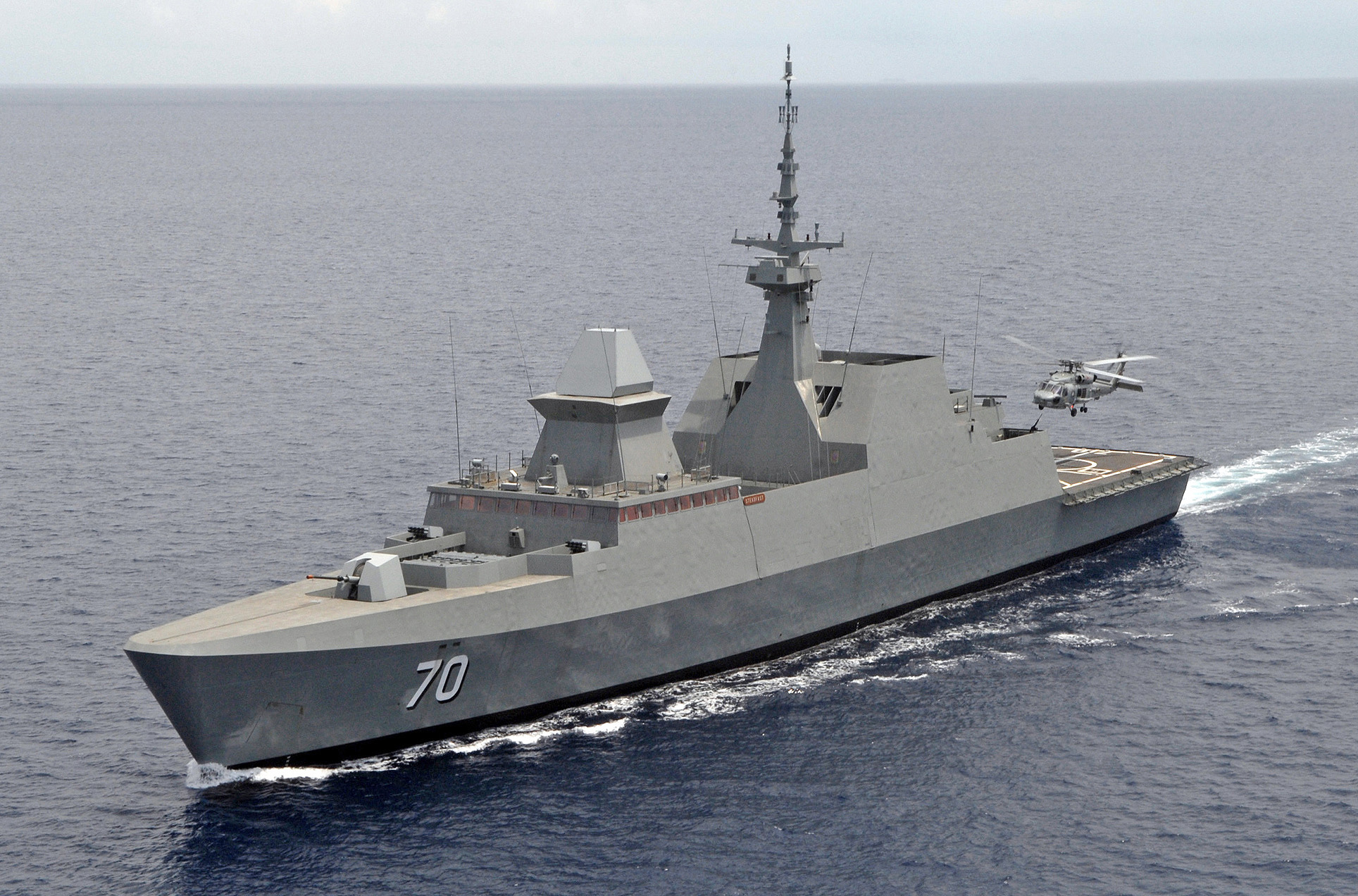
RSS Steadfast, a Formidable-class frigate of the Republic of Singapore Navy, equipped with Aster 15/30

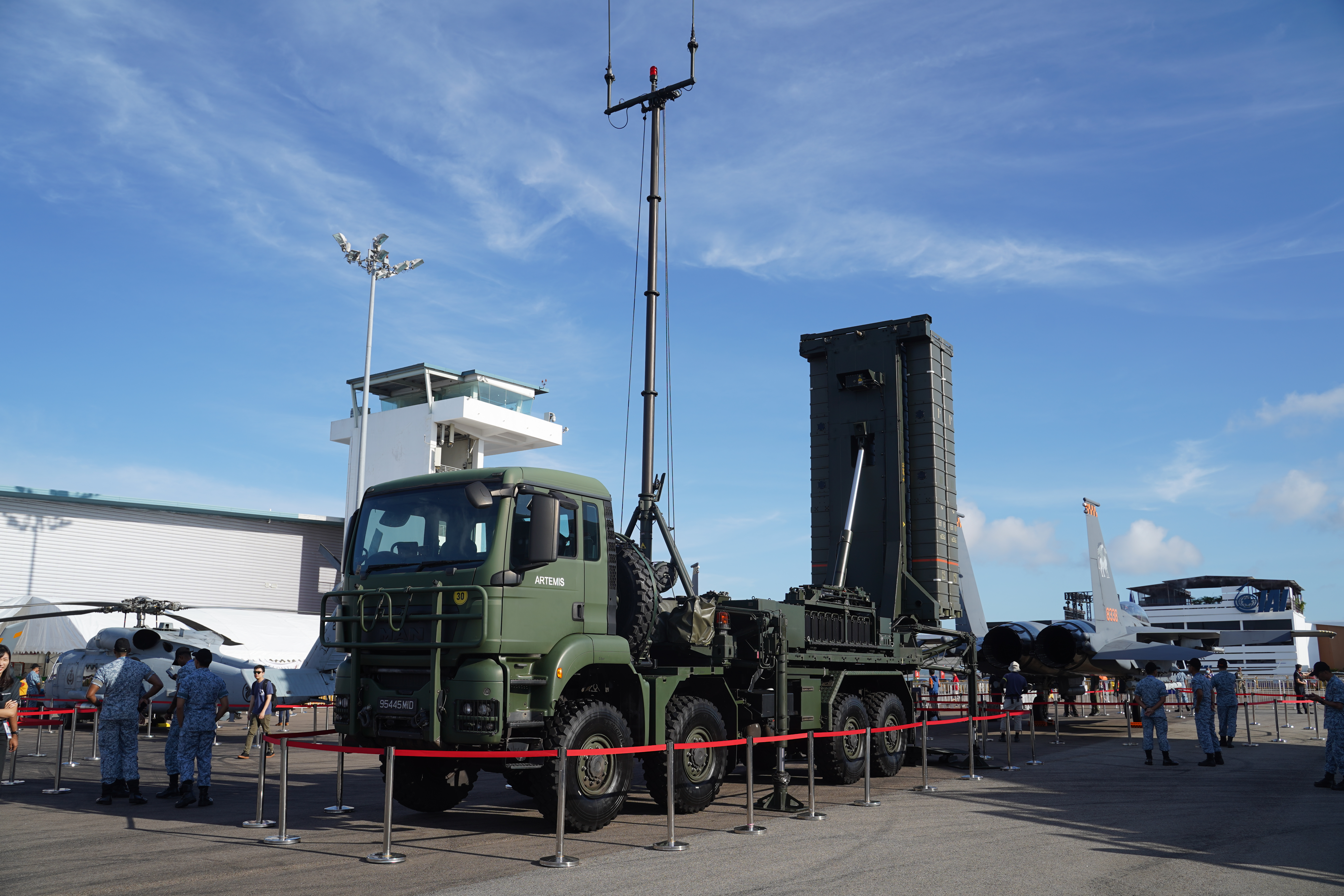
The MBDA Aster 30 of the Republic of Singapore Air Force displayed in Singapore Air Show 2020

=== Current operators ===
==== Naval surface-to-air missile ====
Algeria
Algerian National Navy
Egypt
Egyptian Navy
France
French Navy
Greece
Hellenic Navy – Aster 30 B1 for Kimon-class frigates
Italy
Italian Navy
Morocco
Royal Moroccan Navy
Qatar
Qatar Navy
Saudi Arabia
Royal Saudi Navy
Singapore
Republic of Singapore Navy
United Kingdom
Royal Navy

==== SAMP/T surface-to-air missile ====
France
French Air and Space Force
Italy
Italian Army
Italian Air Force
Singapore
Republic of Singapore Air Force
Ukraine
One SAMP/T battery delivered jointly by France and Italy in 2023. The future delivery of another battery by Italy was announced in June 2024. Delivery of an additional battery was announced in May 2025.

=== Future operators ===
==== SAMP/T surface-to-air missile ====
Denmark
Danish Defence – on 12 September 2025 it was announced that Denmark would acquire SAMP/T systems.

=== Potential operators ===
==== Naval surface-to-air missile ====
Indonesia
Ministry of Defence (Indonesia) - Indonesia Plans to purchase a Ship-Based Air Defense System (VLS / Vertical Launch System), to be placed on the Offshore Patrol Vessel KRI - Brawijaya and KRI - Siliwangi. Missile variants include the Aster-15 and Aster-30 missiles.
Portugal
3 FREMM-EVO ordered to Italy, they will likely be armed with the same weapons as the Italian variant.
Sweden
Sweden has expressed interest in acquiring the Aster 30 air defense system from France to equip its new Luleå-class surface combatants. These vessels, currently under development, are intended to enhance the Swedish Navy’s capabilities in anti-air warfare and are expected to complement the existing Visby-class corvettes.

==== SAMP/T NG surface-to-air missile ====
Belgium
Belgium is looking for a multi-layer air defence system, and has not yet selected the highest tier system. The Patriot system and the SAMP/T NG are competing.
Croatia
Croatian Air Force – In a decisive strategic initiative to fortify its national air and missile defence capabilities, the Republic of Croatia is evaluating the SAMP/T NG missile defence system, outfitted with Aster 30 B1NT missiles. This procurement would underscore Croatia's proactive efforts to bolster its military infrastructure amidst dynamically evolving global security challenges.
Slovak Air Force – The Slovak Ministry of Defence is negotiating and comparing offers for MRAD systems from Israeli companies, American–Norwegian NASAMS and French Aérospatiales SAMP/T system. Systems will replace old Soviet 2K12 Kub systems. Systems should be acquired in 2024.
Switzerland
Following the delays of the Patriot missile systems to be delivered, Switzerland is looking for a complementary system.
The competing systems come from Germany (IRIS-T SLX), South Korea (L-SAM) and Israel (David’s Sling).
Turkey
Turkish Air Force – In January 2018, a contract was signed during a state visit by the President of Turkey in Paris for a project with Eurosam for a future Long Range Air and Missile Defence System (LORAMIDS) for a period of 18 months where Turkish companies Roketsan and Aselsan would participate in the joint-production of the missile system. It was stated that the SAMP/T air defence system project, which was stopped at the end of 2019 due to Turkey's launch of Operation Peace Spring in Syria, came to the agenda at the NATO Summit, and that Turkey, France and Italy would revive the project.

== See also ==
- Anti-aircraft warfare
- Anti-ballistic missile
- Comparison of anti-ballistic missile systems
- List of missiles
- Surface-to-air missile
- ForceShield, French integrated system of Air Defence
- PAAMS, joint programme developed by France, Italy, and the United Kingdom for an integrated anti-aircraft warfare system
- Barak 8 – (India, Israel)
- Barak MX – (Israel)
- CAMM – (United Kingdom, Italy)
- Hisar (missile family) – (Turkey)
- HQ-9 – (China)
- KM-SAM – (South Korea)
- L-SAM – (South Korea)
- MIM-104 Patriot – (United States)
- PAAMS – (United Kingdom, France, Italy)
- RIM-161 Standard Missile 3 – (United States)
- RIM-162 ESSM – (United States)
- RIM-174 Standard ERAM – (United States)
- RIM-66 Standard – (United States)
- RIM-67 Standard – (United States)
- S-300 missile system – (Soviet Union, Russia)
- S-400 missile system – (Soviet Union, Russia)
- S-500 missile system – (Russia)
- Tor missile system – (Soviet Union, Russia)
- Type 03 Chū-SAM – (Japan)
- Khordad 15 (air defense system) – (Iran)
