= Sylver vertical launching system =

Vertical launching system designed by DCNS

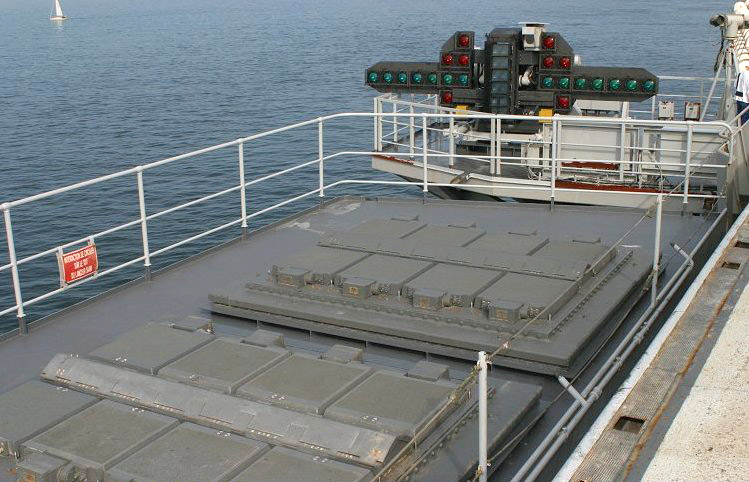
Aster 15 Sylver launchers on the aircraft carrier Charles de Gaulle

The Sylver (système de lancement vertical) is a vertical launching system (VLS) built by Naval Group and introduced in 2001.

== History ==
=== Development ===
DCNS began developing a vertical launching system in the early 1980s, following the Falklands War, which demonstrated the importance for large surface combatants of maintaining a 360° air-defense bubble against anti-ship missiles.

The Sylver family of vertical launchers was developed to meet the requirements of major European naval armament programs:

- Sylver A43 was developed for the SAAM (Surface-to-Air Anti-Missile) system, using the Aster 15 missile, as part of the broader Franco–Italian FSAF program launched in 1999.
- Sylver A50 was developed under the PAAMS program, adapting the Aster 30 missile from the FSAF program for shipboard use.
- Sylver A70 was designed for use with the FREMM frigates and the MdCN (Missile de Croisière Naval) cruise missile. It was also considered for launching the Exoguard exo-atmospheric interceptor missile, developed by Astrium for ballistic missile defense.
- Sylver A35 was a smaller launcher envisioned in the early 2000s for the VL Mica missile, but development was not completed due to budget constraints. Nevertheless, test firings were conducted in December 2007, and continued in October 2008 with a Crotale NG missile.
- A larger Sylver variant is reportedly under consideration for the FMAN/FMC and Aquila programs, intended to replace the Aster missile family in the future.

The first Sylver system was delivered in 1997.

=== Production ===
Sylver launch systems are assembled by Naval Group at the Ruelle Foundry in Ruelle-sur-Touvre, where approximately 60% of each launcher is manufactured. Production requires advanced welding skills due to the high structural demands placed on the system, and components are radiographically inspected to verify their characteristics.

In response to increasing demand, Naval Group reduced production time from 36 months to 24 months after order placement starting in 2019.

== Specifications ==
The basic unit of Sylver VLS is an eight-cell module fitted with two rows of 56 cm missile cells surrounding the uptake for exhaust gas, and the specifications for different models are as follows:

VLS Sylver
Sylver module	Cells configuration	Cell dimensions	Module length	Module width	Module height	Max. missile length	Weight	Notes
Sylver A-43	8 (2×4 cells)	56 cm (22 in) × 56 cm (22 in)	2.59 m (8 ft 6 in)	2.27 m (7 ft 5 in)	5.33 m (17 ft 6 in)	4.35 m (14 ft 3 in)	7.5 t (17,000 lb)	–
Sylver A-50	8 (2×4 cells)	56 cm (22 in) × 56 cm (22 in)	2.59 m (8 ft 6 in)	2.27 m (7 ft 5 in)	6.08 m (19 ft 11 in)	5.05 m (16 ft 7 in)	8.0 t (17,600 lb)	–
Sylver A-70	8 (2×4 cells)	56 cm (22 in) × 56 cm (22 in)	2.59 m (8 ft 6 in)	2.27 m (7 ft 5 in)	7.60 m (24 ft 11 in)	6.60 m (21 ft 8 in)	12.0 t (26,500 lb)	–
Sylver CL	24 (3×8 cells)	N/A	N/A	N/A	N/A	N/A	N/A	

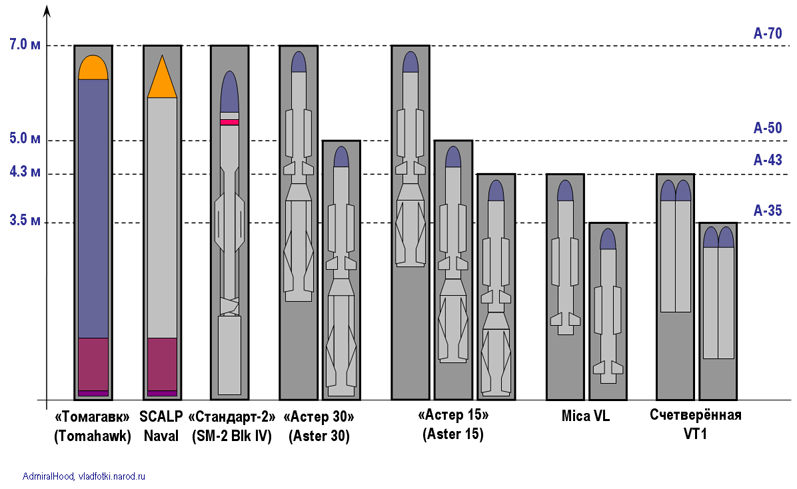
Comparison graphics

The launcher comes in several variants, each distinguished by their height. A-35 and A-43 were developed for launching short range surface-to-air missiles, the A-50 for the long-range PAAMS air defense system, and the A-70 launcher for longer missiles such as the MdCN naval land attack cruise missile. The numbers refer to the approximate length of the missile which can be accommodated, in decimetres, i.e. the A-43 can hold missiles which are up to 4.3 metres (14 ft 1 in) long whilst the A-70 can accommodate missiles up to 7 metres (23 ft 0 in) long.

The launchers come in eight-cell modules, except A-35 available in four-cell modules, with each eight-cell module occupying six square metres (65 sq ft) of deck space. Inner size cell is 60 centimetres (24 in) long and 56 cm (22 in) wide, and each cell has its own exhaust vent. Crotale NG (VT1) missiles can be quad-packed in one cell.

The primary application of the launcher has been the Aster. The Sylver, together with the Aster, is the primary component of the PAAMS naval anti-air warfare system. Using PAAMS, up to eight missiles can be launched in 10 seconds.

France has developed a sea-based deep strike cruise missile capable of being launched from the Sylver. Called the MdCN, the missile gives the French Navy a land-attack capability in the mould of the U.S. Tomahawk.

=== Sylver-CL ===
A new variant of the Sylver launcher, nicknamed Sylver-CL for Cold Launch, is currently being developed by Naval Group for the CAMM family of missiles by MBDA.

The Sylver-CL launcher will have the same footprint as the other Sylver variants and will fit 8 CAMM or CAMM-ER missiles per cell.

This new launcher is being developed for the Swedish Navy's Luleå-class frigate based on the FDI design. Each ship will be fitted with 32 vls cells including 24 Sylver A50 for 24 Aster 30 and 8 Sylver-CL for 24 CAMM-ER.

Vertical Missile Launcher Sylver
Variant	Number of cells	Crotale VT1	VL Mica	VL Mica NG	Aster 15	Aster 30	MdCN	CAMM	CAMM-ER
A35	8	1 × / cell	1 × / cell	1 × / cell	–	–	–	–	–
A43	8	1 × / cell	1 × / cell	1 × / cell	1 × / cell	–	–	–	–
A50	8	–	–	–	1 × / cell	1 × / cell	–	–	–
A70	8	–	–	–	–	–	1 × / cell	–	–
CL	8	–	–	–	–	–	–	3 × / cell	3 × / cell

== Operators ==
User	Ship class / ships	Ship role	Quantity of ships in service	Quantity of VLS of each type per ship				
User	Ship class / ships	Ship role	Quantity of ships in service	A-35	A-43	A-50	A-70	CL
Current ships
Algerian National Navy	Kalaat Béni Abbès (San Giorgio class)	Multipurpose amphibious ship	1	–	–	2 × 8	–	–
Egyptian Navy	Aquitaine class (FREMM frigate)	Frigate (multimission)	1 (former French unit)	–	2 × 8	–	–	–
Egyptian Navy	Bergamini-class (FREMM frigate)	Frigate (multimission)	2 (former Italian units)	–	–	2 × 8	–	–
French Navy	Charles de Gaulle	1 x Nuclear aircraft carrier	1	–	4 × 8	–	–	–
French Navy	Aquitaine class (FREMM frigate)	Frigate (ASW)	4	–	2 × 8	–	2 × 8	–
French Navy	Aquitaine class (FREMM frigate)	Frigate (ASW)	2	–	–	2 × 8	2 × 8	–
French Navy	Aquitaine class (FREMM frigate)	Frigate (AAW)	2	–	–	4 × 8	–	–
French Navy	Horizon class	Destroyer (AAW)	2	–	–	6 × 8	–	–
Hellenic Navy	Kimon class (FDI class)	Frigate (multimission)	4	–	–	3 × 8	1 × 8	–
Indonesian Navy	Paolo Thaon di Revel class	Frigate (multi-mission)	2	–	–	2 × 8	–	–
Italian Navy	Bergamini-class (FREMM frigate)	Frigate (multi-mission)	10	–	–	2 × 8	–	–
Italian Navy	Cavour	Light aircraft carrier	1	–	4 × 8	–	–	–
Italian Navy	Trieste	Landing helicopter dock	1	–	–	4 × 8	–	–
Italian Navy	Horizon class	Destroyer (AAW)	2	–	–	6 × 8	–	–
Italian Navy	Paolo Thaon di Revel class	Frigate (multi-mission)	5	–	–	2 × 8	–	–
Qatari Emiri Navy	Al Zubarah-class	Corvette (multi-mission)	4	–	–	2 × 8	–	–
Qatari Emiri Navy	Al Fulk (San Giorgio class)	Amphibious transport dock	1	–	–	2 × 8	–	–
Republic of Singapore Navy	Formidable class (La Fayette class derivative)	Frigate (multi-mission)	6	–	2 × 8	2 × 8	–	–
Royal Moroccan Navy	Mohammed VI (FREMM class)	Frigate (multi-mission)	1	–	2 × 8	–	–	–
Royal Navy	Type 45	Destroyer (AAW)	6	–	–	6 × 8	–	–
Royal Saudi Navy	Al Riyadh class (La Fayette class)	Frigate (multi-mission)	3	–	2 × 8	–	–	–
Future ships
French Navy	Amiral Ronarc’h class (units 1, 2 and 3: to receive 2 launchers during first refit)	Frigate (multi-mission)	3	–	–	2 × 8	–	–
French Navy	Amiral Ronarc’h class (units 4 and 5)	Frigate (multi-mission)	2	–	–	4 × 8	–	–
French Navy	PANG	Aircraft carrier	1	Unknown quantity	Unknown quantity	Unknown quantity	Unknown quantity	Unknown quantity
Italian Navy	Paolo Thaon di Revel class (PPA class)	Frigate (multi-mission)	2	–	–	2 × 8	–	–
Republic of Singapore Navy	Victory-class multi-role combat vessel	Frigate	6	–	–	–	–	–
Swedish Navy	Luleå-class frigate (FDI class)	Frigate	4	–	–	3 × 8	–	1 × 24

== See also ==
- GJB 5860-2006 - A vertical launching system of People's Liberation Army Navy.
- K-VLS - A vertical launching system of Republic of Korea Navy.
- Mark 41 Vertical Launching System - A vertical launching system of United States Navy.
- Poliment-Redut - A vertical launching system of Russian Navy, navalized version of S-350.
- 3S-14 - A vertical launching system of Russian Navy for cruise, anti-ship and anti-submarine missiles.
