= Resilience (power system) =

Measure of strength of a power system

Definitions for power system resilience vary, but a commonly cited definition was proposed by the Federal Energy Regulatory Com- mission (FERC), which defines it as ”the ability to withstand and reduce the magnitude and/or duration of disruptive events, which includes the capacity to anticipate, absorb, adapt to, and/or rapidly recover from such an event". Attributes that define a resilient system are, for example, predictive capacity, robustness, adaptability, rate of recovery and adaptive capacity. All systems have different vulnerabilities, and resilience is therefore studied in both a system- and event-specific manner. The event scope for resilience is often defined as high-impact low-probability events, or extreme events. However, as extreme climate-related events and cybersecurity events have grown more common, a more universal definition is that resilience deals with n-k, k>5 events.

== Relevant events ==
High-impact low-probability events can be caused by for example, extreme weather, human error, ageing infrastructure or cyberattacks. These events cause significant devastation over vast areas for an extended period. For example, a severe storm can knock out power to a large geographical area, while a cyberattack on the communication systems can disrupt the entire power grid. As these events are rare, there is limited data available on their effects, which makes calculating the risks of the events challenging. Additionally, the interdependence of different infrastructures, such as energy, transportation, and communication, can exacerbate the impact of a disruptive event. Therefore, strategic resilience planning for mitigating the negative effects of future events requires a comprehensive approach that considers a range of potential disruptive events and their potential impact across the power system infrastructure.

== Importance ==
Regardless of the reasons, one growing concern is that power outages result in economic losses and hardship for people who have become increasingly reliant on electricity for even basic comforts. So it is essential that electrical power systems (EPSs) around the world are resilient. A resilient EPS should ensure an uninterrupted power supply, even in the face of minor faults and major disruptive events. It should be robust enough to be reliable and have the ability to predict and prepare for potential outages. Additionally, a resilient EPS should have a mechanism to quickly recover and restore power to critical establishments. However, while power system reliability is well-defined and has established metrics in the electricity sector, resiliency is often confused with reliability, despite some similarities.

According to the findings of National Academies report, the electric grid's smooth operation, which is organized in a hierarchical structure and tightly interconnected on a large scale, will remain crucial for ensuring dependable electric service to the majority of consumers over the next two decades. Power disruptions are problematic for both consumers and the electric system itself. These disruptions are typically caused by physical damage to local parts of the system, such as lightning strikes, falling trees, or equipment failure. The majority of outages affecting customers in the United States are caused by events that occur in the distribution system, while larger storms, natural phenomena, and operator errors can cause outages across the high-voltage system. A variety of events, such as hurricanes, ice storms, droughts, earthquakes, wildfires, and vandalism, can lead to outages. When power goes out, life becomes more challenging, especially in terms of communication, business operations, and traffic control. Brief outages are usually manageable, but longer and wider outages result in greater costs and inconveniences. Critical services like medical care, emergency services, and communications can be disrupted, leading to potential loss of life. This report focuses on building a resilient electric system that minimizes adverse impacts of large outages, particularly blackouts that last several days or longer and extend over multiple areas or states, which are particularly problematic for a modern economy that depends on reliable electric supply.

== Resilience vs reliability ==
Despite the efforts of utilities to prevent and mitigate large-scale power outages, they still occur and cannot be eliminated due to the numerous potential sources of disruption to the power system. It is somewhat surprising that such outages are not more frequent, considering the magnitude of the system and the potential for problems. However, the planners and operators of the system have made great efforts over many years to ensure that the electric system is engineered and operated with a high level of reliability. In recent times, there has been an increased emphasis on resilience as well. The North American Electric Reliability Corporation (NERC), which is responsible for developing reliability standards for the bulk power system, defines reliability in terms of two fundamental concepts.

1. Adequacy: Adequacy refers to the capability of the electricity system to meet the overall electricity demand and energy needs of end-users consistently, considering both planned and unexpected outages of system components that are reasonably anticipated.
2. Operating reliability: The capability of the overall electrical power system to endure unexpected disruptions, like electrical faults or unforeseen component failures due to credible emergencies, without experiencing unmanaged, widespread power outages or harm to machinery.

The system's reliability standards vary in practice, and while the bulk power system maintains a relatively high level of reliability throughout the United States, it cannot be made completely faultless due to its complexity as a "cyber-physical system." To ensure adequacy of electricity generation capability, a one-day-in-ten-years loss of load standard is commonly used, which means that the generation reserves must be sufficient to prevent voluntary load shedding due to inadequate supply from occurring more than once every ten years. However, with millions of intricate physical, communications, computational, and networked components and systems, the system is inherently complex and cannot attain perfect reliability.

Resilience and reliability are two different concepts. Resilience, as defined by the Random House Dictionary of the English Language, refers to the ability to return to the original state after being stretched, compressed, or bent. Moreover, resilience involves recovering from adversity, illness, depression, or other similar situations. It also encompasses the ability to rebound and cope with outages effectively by reducing their impacts, regrouping quickly and efficiently after the event ends, and learning to handle future events better.

== Resilience in the US ==
Climate-related issues have intensified the attention on energy sustainability and resilience. In the United States, electric utility firms have registered over 2500 significant power outages since 2002, with almost half of them (specifically 1172) attributed to weather events, including storms, hurricanes, and other unspecified severe weather occurrences. These incidents often lead to significant economic losses.

The Committee on Enhancing the Resilience of the Nation's Electric Power Transmission and Distribution System has developed strategies that seek to reduce the impact of large-scale, long-duration outages. Resilience is not just about preventing these outages from happening, but also limiting their scope and impact, restoring power quickly, and preparing for future events.

Some parts of the United States still rely on regulated, vertically integrated utilities, while others have adopted competitive markets. Efforts to improve resilience must take into account this institutional and policy heterogeneity.

The use of automation at the high-voltage level can improve grid reliability, but also introduces cybersecurity vulnerabilities. These "smart grids" use improved sensing, communication, automation technologies, and advanced metering infrastructure.

Distributed energy resources are rapidly growing in some states, but most U.S. customers will continue to depend on the large-scale, interconnected, and hierarchically structured electric grid. Therefore, strategies to enhance electric power resilience must consider a diverse set of technical and institutional arrangements and a wide variety of hazards. There is no single solution that fits all situations when it comes to avoiding, planning for, coping with, and recovering from major outages.

== See also ==
- Resilient control systems
