= CAPTAS-4 =

Towed array sonar

The CAPTAS-4 is a towed array sonar developed by Thales Underwater Systems to equip first-rank surface combatants. Manufactured in Brest, France, it represents the high-end and most powerful system of the company's CAPTAS (Combined Active and Passive Towed Array Sonar) line of products and equips several first-rank warships of the French Navy as well as those of various export customers. A British variant, known as Sonar 2087, equips anti-submarine warfare frigates of the Royal Navy.

== Description ==
The CAPTAS-4 system comprises a UMS-4249 ultra-low-frequency active sonar with four ceramic rings, integrated into a towed variable-immersion body. Capable of diving up to 300 meters (980 ft), it covers a very large volume of water over an extremely long range. In addition to the UMS-4249 variable depth sonar, a towed multi-functional linear antenna equipped with hydrophones is used to capture radiated noise and reflected signals: it picks up the feedback of Very Low Frequency (VLF) emissions from the UMS-4249 to locate, classify and track a target, while at the same time providing passive detection that only listens when active sonars are not being used. It is also designed to detect the specific noise of torpedoes, providing an early warning to deploy countermeasures in the event of a submarine attack on the vessel.

The great attribute of the CAPTAS-4, which separates the transmitting and receiving instruments, is its ability to detect submarines at long range (up to 150 km, 93 mi)— allowing the formation of a "safety bubble" around a carrier battle group for example— and instantly determine where the noise is coming from (port or starboard), which is an advantage on the high seas, but also in coastal areas, where the number of signals is very high. Thanks to variable immersion, the sonar can be positioned at the best spot to avoid the non-detection troughs that form in the sea as a function of temperature, salinity and water pressure; troughs where submarines can hide.

The CAPTAS-4 equips the French, Italian, Egyptian and Moroccan FREMM frigates, Spanish F110 frigates, and was ultimately selected by the US Navy to equip the Constellation-class frigates after initially favoring a rival system — the DART (Dual-mode Array Transmitter) — whose development had been entrusted by Raytheon but whose performance failed to live up to expectations.

== Variants ==
=== Sonar 2087 ===
Manufactured at various Thales Underwater Systems' sites in the United Kingdom, the Sonar 2087 is a British variant of the CAPTAS-4. It equips the Royal Navy's Type 23 frigates and will also be integrated on the succeeding Type 26 frigates in construction.

=== CAPTAS-4 Compact ===
The CAPTAS-4 compact has been developed to maintain the same detection performance as the CAPTAS-4, while reducing its overall weight by 20% and its footprint by almost 50%. This allows medium-size first-rank frigate such as the 4,000-ton French FDI to have the same collaborative anti-submarine warfare capabilities as larger frigates and destroyers. The CAPTAS-4 Compact can also be containerized, making it the only sonar in its class interchangeable from one vessel to another according to Thales. The new system will equip the French FDI frigates expected to enter operational service in 2025 as well as those purchased by Greece.

== Operators ==
- Egyptian Navy: FREMM frigates
- French Navy: FREMM and Amiral Ronarc'h-class frigates
- Italian Navy: FREMM frigates
- Royal Moroccan Navy: Mohammed VI frigate
- Spanish Navy: Bonifaz-class frigates
- Hellenic Navy: Kimon-class frigates

== Future operators ==
- Swedish Navy: Luleå-class frigates
- Italian Navy: FREMM EVO frigates
- Hellenic Navy: two Italian FREMM frigates to be transferred
- United States Navy: Constellation-class frigates
