= Sylena decoy system =

Naval countermeasures system

Sylena (stylized in all caps) is a family of French decoy-launching system (DLS) that launches countermeasures aimed at protecting small and mid-sized naval vessels from anti-ship missiles using radar or infrared guidance developed by Lacroix Defence and Security, a French countermeasures company. The munitions are intended to seduce or decoy incoming anti-ship missiles.

== Description ==
Sylena is a fixed-mount mortar-based DLS that comes in a variety of sizes:

- Sylena LW (light weight) has two radio-frequency (RF) and two imaging infrared (IIR) decoys per launcher. It is intended for smaller patrol ships of offshore patrol vessels. It weighs 150kg including ammunition.
- Sylena MK1 is designed for corvette or frigate-size vessels. It has 2 RF and four IIR decoys per launcher and weighs 300kg
- Sylena MK2 is designed for corvettes, frigates and larger ships and can launch two RF missile decoys, four IIR decoys as well as three torpedo countermeasures. It weighs 420kg including ammunition.

== Operators ==
It is in use with the following countries:

- Angola
- Egypt
- Greece
- Oman
- Qatar
