= Moroccan frigate Mohammed VI =

FREMM class multi-purpose frigates in the Moroccan Navy

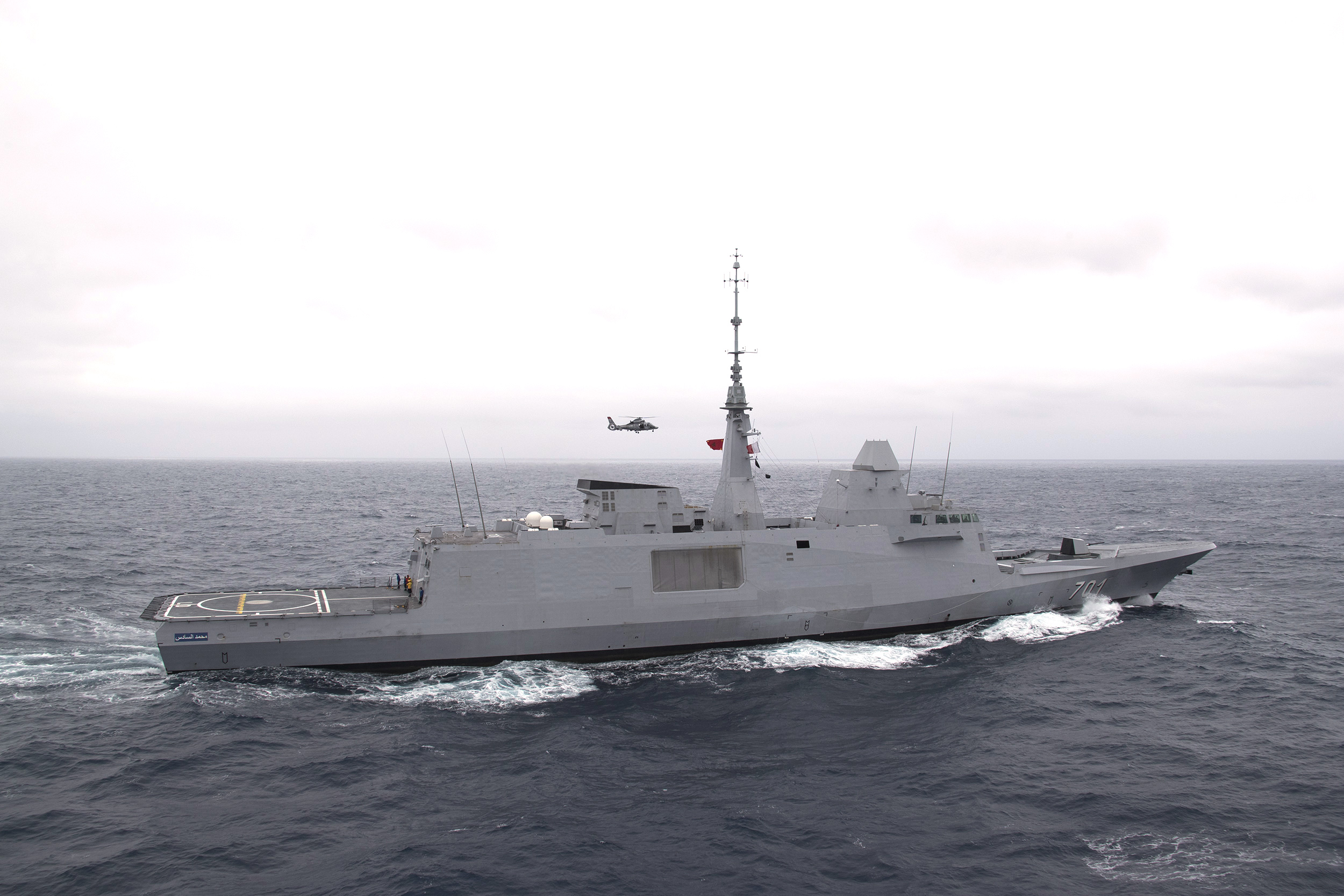
- Mohammed VI underway in the Atlantic Ocean on 25 April 2018

History

Morocco
- Name: Mohammed VI; (محمد السادس)
- Namesake: Mohammed VI of Morocco
- Ordered: 24 October 2007
- Builder: DCNS, Lorient
- Laid down: 2008
- Launched: 14 September 2011
- Commissioned: 30 January 2014
- Home port: Ksar es-Seghir
- Identification: MMSI number: 228706000; Pennant number: 701
- Status: Active

General characteristics
- Class & type: FREMM multipurpose frigate
- Displacement: 6,000 tons
- Length: 466 ft (142.0 m)
- Beam: 65 ft (19.8 m)
- Draught: 16 ft (4.9 m)
- Propulsion: MTU Series 4000 (2,2 MW everyone); CODLOG
- Speed: 27 knots (50 km/h; 31 mph); max cruise speed 15.6 knots (28.9 km/h; 18.0 mph)
- Range: 6,000 nmi (11,000 km; 6,900 mi) at 15 knots (28 km/h; 17 mph)
- Complement: 145
- Sensors & processing systems: Héraklès multi-purpose passive electronically scanned array radar
- Armament: 16-cell MBDA SYLVER A43 VLS for 16 MBDA Aster 15 missiles; 1 × Leonardo OTO Melara 76 mm SR gun; 3 × Nexter 20mm Narwhal remote weapon systems; 8 × MBDA MM-40 Exocet block 3 anti-ship missiles; 2 x double Leonardo (WASS) B-515 launcher for MU 90 torpedoes
- Aviation facilities: Single hangar

Mohammed VI (701) (Arabic: محمد السادس) is a FREMM multipurpose frigate of the Royal Moroccan Navy.

== Development and design ==
Three original variants of the FREMM were proposed; an anti-submarine variant (ASW), a general-purpose variant (GP), and a land-attack variant (AVT) to replace the existing classes of frigates within the French and Italian navies. A total of 27 FREMM were to be constructed - 17 for France and 10 for Italy - with additional aims to seek exports, however budget cuts and changing requirements has seen this number drop significantly for France, while the order for Italy remained unchanged. The land-attack variant (AVT) was subsequently cancelled.

On 24 October 2007 it was announced that the Royal Moroccan Navy had ordered one FREMM to replace its Descubierta-class corvette. The contract was signed on 18 April 2008 and construction of the Moroccan FREMM began in the summer 2008 with delivery expected in 2012 or 2013. The Moroccan ship is similar to the French anti-submarine version, without SYLVER A70 tubes for SCALP Naval, and cost €470m.

== Construction and career ==
Mohammed VI is the largest and most powerful frigate in Africa (with the Egyptian frigate Tahya Misr, of the same class). Mohammed VI was launched on 14 September 2011 and handed over on 30 January 2014. The ship was commissioned on 30 January 2014. Her homeport is Ksar es-Seghir.

On 9 and 10 August 2025, Mohammed VI undertook a Passage Exercise with the Indian Navy's INS Tamal, after the latter's three-day port call at Port of Casablanca.
