= French frigate Aquitaine =

Lead ship of the FREMM class of multi-purpose frigates in the French Navy

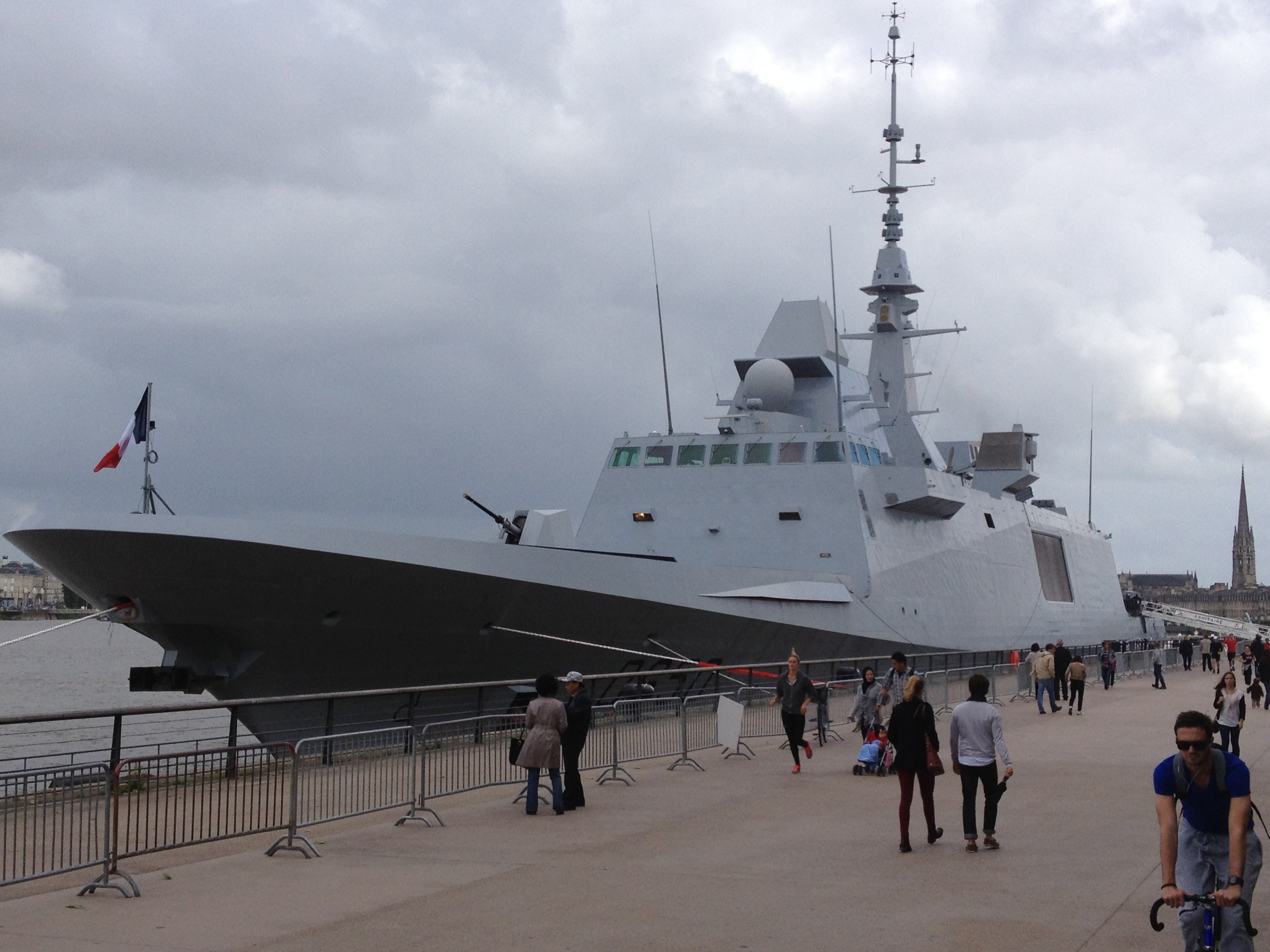
- Aquitaine moored in Bordeaux in 2013

History

France
- Name: Aquitaine
- Builder: DCNS, Lorient
- Laid down: 2007
- Launched: 29 April 2010
- Completed: 2012
- Commissioned: 23 November 2012
- Identification: Pennant number D650
- Status: Active

General characteristics
- Class & type: Aquitaine-class frigate
- Displacement: 6,000 tons
- Length: 466 ft (142.0 m)
- Beam: 65 ft (19.8 m)
- Draught: 16 ft (4.9 m)
- Sensors & processing systems: Héraklès multi-purpose passive electronically scanned array radar; CAPTAS-4 towed-array sonar; UMS 4110 CL hull-mounted sonar
- Armament: 1 x 76 mm Super Rapid gun; 3 x 20 mm Narwhal remote weapon systems; 16-cell SYLVER A43 VLS for Aster 15 air defense missiles; 16-cell SYLVER A70 VLS for MdCN cruise missiles; 8 x Exocet MM40 Block 3 anti-ship missiles (Block 3c variant entering service with the French Navy from December 2022); 2 x B-515 twin launchers for MU90 torpedoes

Aquitaine is a frigate in service with the French Navy. She is the lead ship of her class of French frigates, which in turn were developed by the FREMM multipurpose frigate program.

== Service ==
Aquitaine was developed as part of a joint Franco-Italian program known as FREMM, which was implemented to develop a new class of frigates for use by various European navies. Construction on the ship began in 2007 and was completed in 2012.

In April 2018 Aquitaine participated in the April 2018 missile strikes against Syria alongside her sister ships Auvergne and Languedoc.

In July 2026, Aquitaine deployed to Dublin Bay to provide air-defence coverage for visiting European heads of government during Ireland's Presidency of the Council of the European Union. To comply with constitutional restrictions regarding foreign military operations within Irish territory, the frigate remained stationed just beyond Ireland's 12-nautical-mile (22 km) territorial waters. An Irish Naval Service officer was embarked aboard the ship as a liaison to provide final authorisation under Irish Defence Forces rules of engagement (COD 6) in the event of an interception or engagement over Irish airspace.
