= French frigate Normandie =

FREMM class multi-purpose frigates in the French Navy

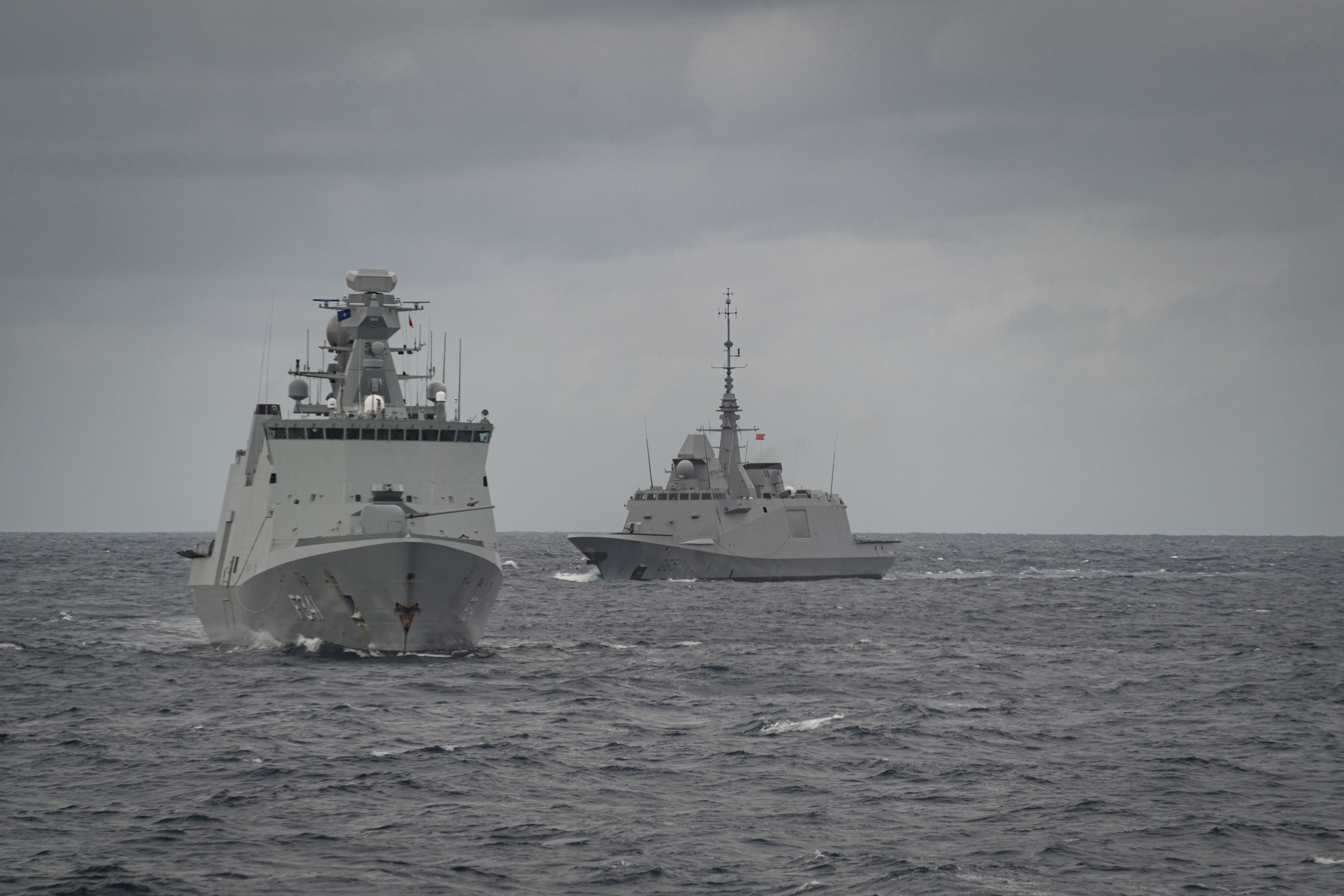
- HDMS Absalon (fore) and Normandie (rear) on 22 May 2021

History

France
- Name: Normandie
- Namesake: Normandie
- Builder: DCNS, Lorient
- Laid down: 2014
- Launched: 1 February 2018
- Completed: 16 July 2019
- Commissioned: 3 June 2020
- Home port: Brest
- Identification: MMSI number: 227999200; Pennant number: D651
- Status: Active

General characteristics
- Class & type: Aquitaine-class frigate
- Displacement: 6,000 tons
- Length: 466 ft (142.0 m)
- Beam: 65 ft (19.8 m)
- Draught: 16 ft (4.9 m)
- Propulsion: MTU Series 4000 (2.2 MW); CODLOG
- Speed: 27 knots (50 km/h; 31 mph); max cruise speed 15.6 knots (28.9 km/h; 18.0 mph)
- Range: 6,000 nmi (11,000 km; 6,900 mi) at 15 knots (28 km/h; 17 mph)
- Complement: 145
- Sensors & processing systems: Héraklès multi-purpose passive electronically scanned array radar; CAPTAS-4 towed-array sonar; UMS 4110 CL hull-mounted sonar
- Armament: 1 × 76 mm Super Rapid gun; 3 × 20 mm Narwhal remote weapon systems; 16-cell SYLVER A50 VLS for Aster 15 or Aster 30 air defense missiles; 16-cell SYLVER A70 VLS for MdCN cruise missiles; 8 × Exocet MM40 Block 3 anti-ship missiles (Block 3c variant entering service with the French Navy from December 2022); 2 × B-515 twin launchers for MU90 torpedoes
- Aircraft carried: 1 × NH90 helicopter
- Aviation facilities: Single hangar

Normandie (D651) is an Aquitaine-class frigate of the French Navy. The Aquitaine class were developed from the FREMM multipurpose frigate program.

== Development and design ==
Original plans were for 17 FREMM hulls to replace the nine D'Estienne d'Orves-class avisos and nine anti-submarine (ASW) frigates of the Tourville and Georges Leygues classes. In November 2005 France announced a contract of €3.5 billion for development and the first eight hulls, with options for nine more costing €2.95 billion split over two tranches (totaling 17).

Following the cancellation of the third and fourth of the Horizon-class frigates in 2005 on budget grounds, requirements for an air-defence derivative of the FREMM called FREDA were placed – with DCNS coming up with several proposals. Expectations were that the last two ships of the 17 FREMM planned would be built to FREDA specifications; however, by 2008 the plan was revised down to just 11 FREMM (9 ASW variants and 2 FREDA variants) The 11 ships would cost €670 million (~US$760m) each in FY2014, or €860m (~US$980m) including development costs. In 2015, the total number of ASW variants was further reduced to just six units, including Normandie.

== Construction and career ==
Normandie was developed as part of a joint Italian-French program known as FREMM, which was implemented to develop a new class of frigates for use by various European navies. Constructed from 2014. On 1 February 2018, the frigate Normandie was launched. Originally, the name Normandie was to be allocated to an earlier ship of the class that had been launched in 2012. However, she was sold to Egyptian Navy in 2015 and renamed Tahya Misr.

Armed with a partial crew of 75 sailors, the ship carried out its first sea trials in March 2019 under the responsibility of the Directorate General for Armament. Unlike previous ASW variants of the FREMM class, Normandie and its sister ship Bretagne are fitted with SYLVER A50 launch cells (instead of SYLVER A43) able to accommodate larger Aster 30 surface-to-air missiles. This provides both ships with a potentially enhanced area air defence capability, though both vessels still lacked both the boosted variant of the Herakles multi-function radar (which was necessary to accommodate the full range of Aster 30) as well as a complementary fire control radar. However, radar information can be provided to the frigate by other air defence vessels in a task group via the Veille de Coopération Navale (VCN) framework. This permits the exchange radar detection information between ships in real time.

Normandie conducted her first ever sea trial off the coast of Lorient on 15 March 2019.

On 6 February 2021, Normandie successfully fired her Aster 30 missile.

Normandie was part of Clemenceau 22 led by the aircraft carrier Charles de Gaulle.
