= ENS Bernees =

FREMM class multi-purpose frigates in the Egyptian Navy

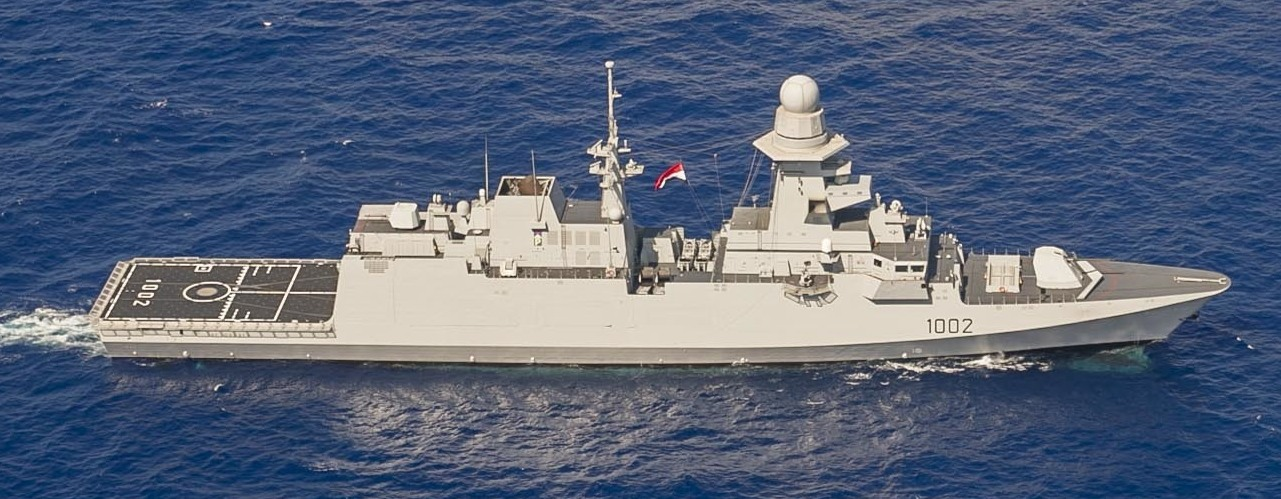
- A sister ship of ENS Bernees, ENS Al-Galala

History

Egypt
- Name: Bernees
- Builder: Fincantieri, Riva Trigoso and Muggiano
- Laid down: January 2018
- Launched: 25 January 2020
- Commissioned: 13 April 2021
- Renamed: from Emilio Bianchi
- Home port: Alexandria
- Identification: Hull number: FFG 1003
- Status: Active

General characteristics
- Class & type: Carlo Bergamini-class frigate
- Displacement: 6,700 tons
- Length: 144.6 ft (44.1 m)
- Beam: 19.7 ft (6.0 m)
- Draught: 8.7 ft (2.7 m)
- Propulsion: CODLAG; 1 × 32 MW gas turbine General Electric/Avio LM2500+G4; 2 × 2.5 MW electric motors Jeumont Electric; 4 × diesel generators; VL 1716 (T2ME series by 2.15 MW everyone, on first two frigate; HPCR series by 2.8 MW everyone, since the third frigate); 2 × shafts, driving controllable pitch propellers; 1 × 1 MW bow thruster
- Speed: 27 knots (50 km/h; 31 mph); max cruise speed 15.6 knots (28.9 km/h; 18.0 mph)
- Range: 6,800 nmi (12,600 km; 7,800 mi) at 15 knots (28 km/h; 17 mph)
- Complement: 199
- Sensors & processing systems: Leonardo Kronos Grand Naval (MFRA) Active electronically scanned array radar; CAPTAS-4 towed-array sonar; UMS 4110 CL hull-mounted sonar
- Armament: 16-cell MBDA SYLVER A50 VLS for 16 MBDA Aster 15 and 30 missiles; 1 × Leonardo Otobreda 127/64 Vulcano; 1 × Leonardo OTO Melara 76/62 mm Davide/Strales CIWS gun; 2 × Leonardo Oto Melara/Oerlikon KBA 25/80 mm remote weapon systems; 8 × MBDA Teseo\Otomat Mk-2/A anti-ship and land attack missiles; 2 x triple Leonardo (WASS) B-515/3 launcher for MU 90 torpedoes; 2 x Leonardo ODLS-20 (Oto Melara Decoy Launching System); 2 x SITEP MASS CS-424 acoustic guns
- Aircraft carried: 2 × SH90; 1 × SH90; 1 × AW101 (armed with MU 90 torpedoes or MBDA Marte Mk2/S missiles)
- Aviation facilities: Double hangar

ENS Bernees (FFG 1003) is a FREMM multipurpose frigate of the Egyptian Navy. Bernees was originally constructed as the Carlo Bergamini-class Emilio Bianchi before being acquired by Egypt and being renamed.

== Development and design ==
Planning assumptions for the Italian Navy are for ten FREMM-IT vessels comprising four anti-submarine warfare (ASW) variants and six general-purpose (GP) variants at a cost of €5.9 billion. The FREMM-ITs will replace the Maestrale and Lupo-class frigates in service with the Italian Navy. In the 2013 Italian budget, the Italian government laid out the necessary financing for two more GP variants (FREMM-IT 7 & 8) and the contract was awarded in September 2013. On 15 April 2015, the Italian Parliament confirmed the deal between OCCAR and Orizzonte Sistemi Navali Spa (Fincantieri and Finmeccanica, since 2017 Leonardo) to begin building units 9 and 10, for 764 million Euros.

As of 16 April 2015, the Italian government has approved funding for all ten FREMM-IT to be delivered to the Italian Navy (4 ASW variants and 6 GP variants).

FREMM-IT 9 & 10 will have undisclosed enhanced capabilities. All ten Italian FREMM-ITs have extended anti-air warfare capabilities, with SAAM-ESD CMS, Aster 30 and Aster 15 missiles for extended area defence. SAAM-ESD CMS use Leonardo MFRA, a 3D active radar (AESA), an evolved version of the Leonardo EMPAR PESA radar (previously embarked on Horizon-class destroyers and the aircraft carrier Cavour). Since the seventh FREMM-IT, there will be updates, such as new conformal IFF antenna and much more stealth response. Since the ninth FREMM-IT, SCLAR-H replaced with Leonardo ODLS-20. In 2017 the Italian FREMM refit started with the installation on each of two SITEP MS-424 acoustic guns.

In 2020 it was reported that Italy would sell its last two FREMM-class frigates in the current production line (Spartaco Schergat and Emilio Bianchi) to Egypt. Spartaco Schergat was in the final stage of her sea trials while Emilio Bianchi would follow within one year. The deal reportedly also involved other military equipment and was worth 1.2 billion Euros. It was reported that Italy would then order two additional FREMM frigates to replace those transferred to Egypt with the anticipated delivery of the replacements by 2024.

Some sensitive equipment was deleted from the original Italian design, including the EW suite's jammers, NETTUNO-4100 RECM system and Thales Altesse CESM equipment. SATCOM antennas were also removed from the communication suite.

== Construction and career ==
On 25 January 2020, the launching ceremony of the ship took place at the Fincantieri plants in Riva Trigoso. She is expected to be commissioned in April 2021. On 24 February 2021, she left La Spezia to undergo her first sea trial. The vessel was delivered to the Egyptian Navy in April 2021.
