= French frigate Bretagne =

FREMM class multi-purpose frigates in the French Navy

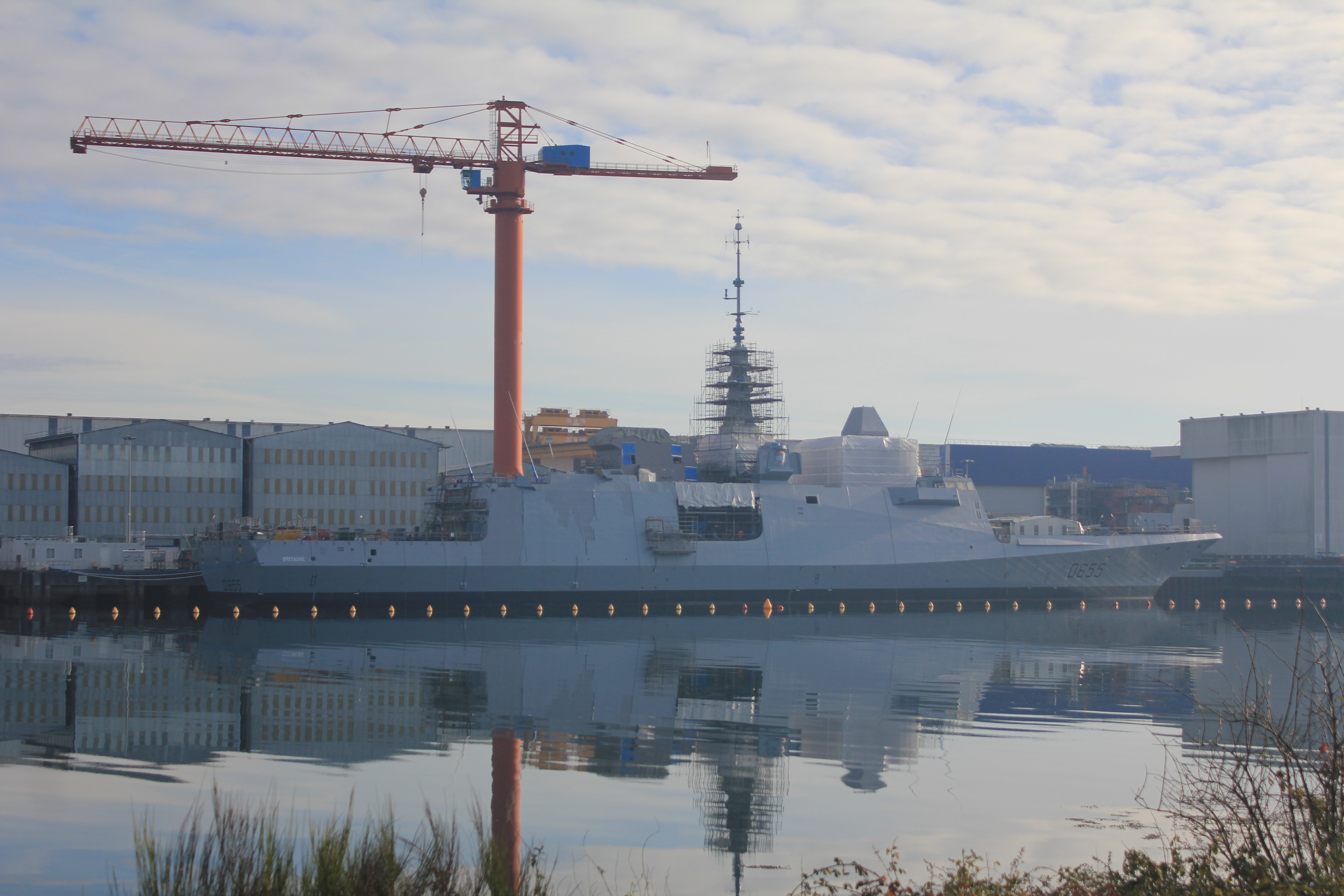
- Bretagne on 7 January 2017

History

France
- Name: Bretagne
- Namesake: Bretagne
- Builder: DCNS, Lorient
- Laid down: October 2013
- Launched: 16 September 2016
- Completed: 18 July 2018
- Commissioned: 20 February 2019
- Home port: Brest
- Identification: MMSI number: 226010070; Pennant number: D655
- Status: Active

General characteristics
- Class & type: Aquitaine-class frigate
- Displacement: 6,000 tons
- Length: 466 ft (142.0 m)
- Beam: 65 ft (19.8 m)
- Draught: 16 ft (4.9 m)
- Propulsion: MTU Series 4000 (2.2 MW); CODLOG
- Speed: 27 knots (50 km/h; 31 mph); max cruise speed 15.6 knots (28.9 km/h; 18.0 mph)
- Range: 6,000 nmi (11,000 km; 6,900 mi) at 15 knots (28 km/h; 17 mph)
- Complement: 145
- Sensors & processing systems: Héraklès multi-purpose passive electronically scanned array radar; CAPTAS-4 towed-array sonar; UMS 4110 CL hull-mounted sonar
- Armament: 1 × 76 mm Super Rapid gun; 3 × 20 mm Narwhal remote weapon systems; 16-cell SYLVER A50 VLS for Aster 15 or Aster 30 air defense missiles; 16-cell SYLVER A70 VLS for MdCN cruise missiles; 8 × MM40 Exocet Block 3 anti-ship missiles (Block 3c variant entering service with the French Navy from December 2022); 2 × B-515 twin launchers for MU90 torpedoes
- Aircraft carried: 1 × NH90 helicopter
- Aviation facilities: Single hangar

Bretagne (D655) is an Aquitaine-class frigate of the French Navy. The Aquitaine class were developed from the European multi-mission frigate (FREMM) program.

== Development and design ==
Original plans were for 17 FREMM hulls to replace the nine D'Estienne d'Orves-class avisos and nine anti-submarine (ASW) frigates of the Tourville and Georges Leygues classes. In November 2005 France announced a contract of €3.5 billion for development and the first eight hulls, with options for nine more costing €2.95 billion split over two tranches (totaling 17).

Following the cancellation of the third and fourth of the Horizon-class frigates in 2005 on budget grounds, requirements for an air-defence derivative of the FREMM called FREDA were placed – with DCNS coming up with several proposals. Expectations were that the last two ships of the 17 FREMM planned would be built to FREDA specifications; however, by 2008 the plan was revised down to just 11 FREMM (9 ASW variants and 2 FREDA variants) at a cost of €8.75 billion (FY13, ~US$12 billion). The 11 ships would cost €670 million (~US$760m) each in FY2014, or €860m (~US$980m) including development costs. In 2015, the total number of ASW variants was further reduced to just six units, including Bretagne.

== Construction and career ==
Bretagne was developed as part of a joint Italian-French program known as FREMM, which was implemented to develop a new class of frigates for use by various European navies. Constructed from 2013 the frigate Bretagne was launched in September 2016 and commissioned in February 2019.

Unlike previous ASW variants of the FREMMs, Bretagne and her sister ship Normandie are fitted with SYLVER A50 launch cells (instead of SYLVER A43) able to accommodate larger Aster-30 surface-to-air missiles. This provides both ships with a potentially enhanced area air defence capability, though both vessels still lacked the boosted variant of the Herakles multi-function radar (which was necessary to accommodate the full range of Aster 30) as well as a complementary fire control radar. In June 2023, the frigate was reported to have fired her first Aster-30 missile during a multi-national exercise. Radar information was provided to Bretagne by the frigate Forbin via the Veille de Coopération Navale (VCN) framework, which allows for the exchange radar detection information between ships in real time.

In August 2022, Bretagne was despatched to escort the Russian cruiser Marshal Ustinov and the destroyer Vice-Admiral Kulakov during their transit through the Bay of Biscay following the deployment of the Russian vessels from their Northern Fleet bases on the Kola Peninsula to the Mediterranean.

In 2024, the frigate was operating in the Pacific taking part in joint exercises with the Japanese Maritime Self Defense Force and participating in annual RIMPAC exercises with the US Navy and allied navies.
