= FREMM multipurpose frigate =

Class of multi-purpose frigates

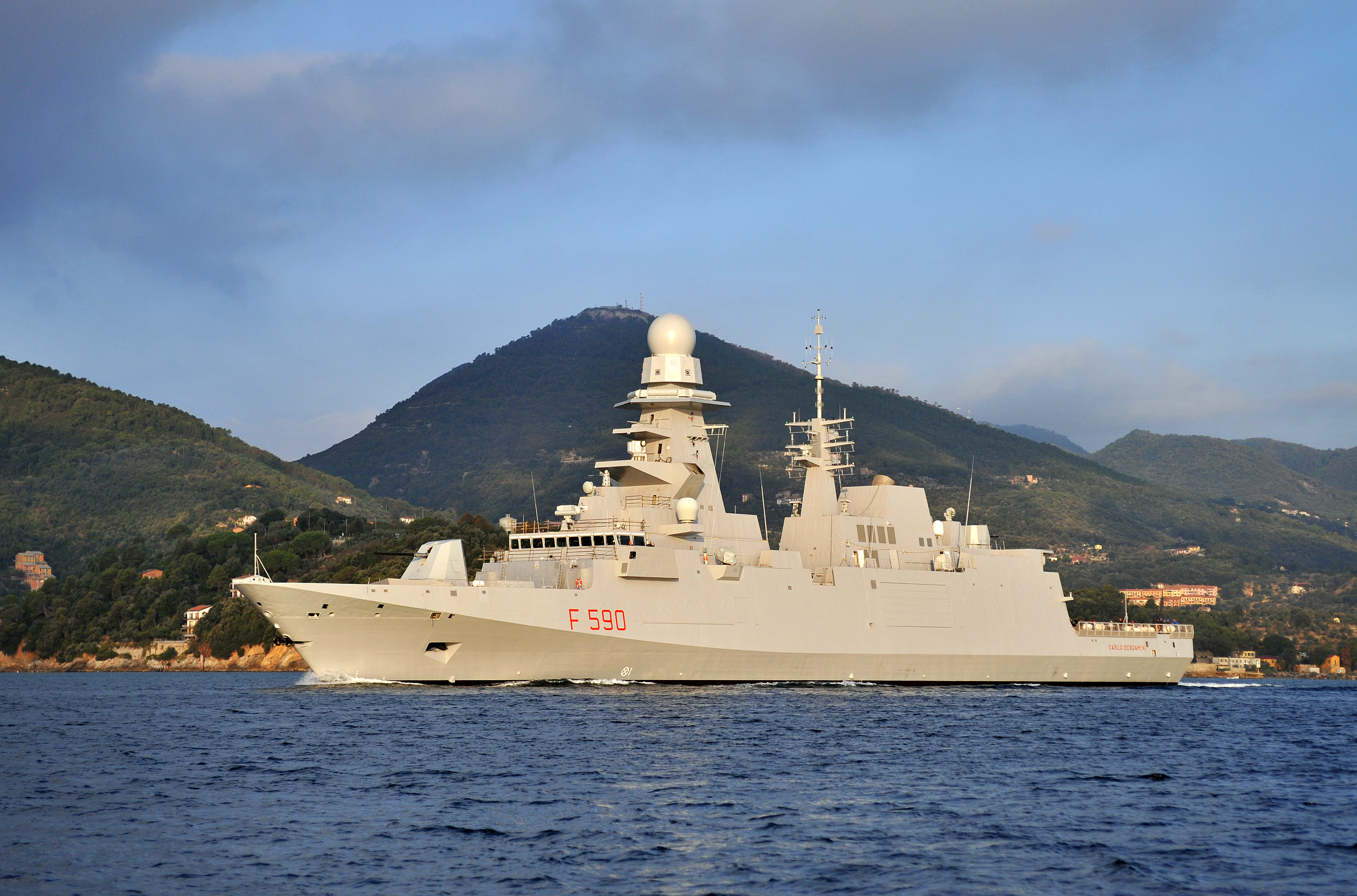
- Italian FREMM frigate Carlo Bergamini

Class overview
- Name: FREMM
- Builders: France: Naval Group; Italy: Fincantieri
- Operators: Italian Navy; French Navy; Egyptian Navy; Royal Moroccan Navy; United States Navy (on order); Hellenic Navy (2 ordered, +2 option); Portuguese Navy (+3 option)
- Preceded by: Georges Leygues class (France); Cassard class (France); Lupo class (Italy); Maestrale class (Italy); Oliver Hazard Perry class (United States); Freedom class (United States); Independence class (United States)
- Succeeded by: FF(X) (United States)
- Subclasses: Constellation class (United States)
- Cost: France: €670 million (2014) (equivalent to €810.66 million in 2025) per unit; Italy: €598 million (2016) per unit; Morocco: €470 million (2014) (equivalent to €568.67 million in 2025) per unit; US: US$795 million (2020) (equivalent to US$973.04 million in 2025) for the first unit
- Built: 2007–present
- In commission: 2012–present
- Planned: 66 (France: 17, Italy: 12, Morocco: 1, Egypt: 5, US: 20, Portugal: 3, Greece: 2)
- Cancelled: 9 (France), 18 (US)
- Active: 22 (Italy: 10, France: 8, Morocco: 1, Egypt: 3)

General characteristics
- Type: Frigate
- Displacement: France: 6,000 t (5,900 long tons); Italy: 6,700 t (6,600 long tons) (5,500 tonnes, light displacement)
- Length: France: 142 m (465 ft 11 in) LOA; Italy: 144.6 m (474 ft 5 in) LOA; Italy: 132.5 m (434 ft 9 in) LPP
- Beam: France: 20 m (65 ft 7 in); Italy: 19.7 m (64 ft 8 in)
- Draught: France: 7.6 m (24 ft 11 in); Italy: 8.7 m (28 ft 7 in)
- Propulsion: France: CODLOG; Italy: CODLAG; 1 × 32 MW General Electric/Avio LM2500+G4 gas turbine; 2 × 2.5 MW Jeumont Electric electric motors; 4 × diesel generators; France: MTU Series 4000 (2.2 MW each); Italy: Isotta Fraschini VL 1716 (T2ME series by 2.15 MW each, on first two frigate; HPCR series by 2.8 MW each, since the third frigate); 2 × shafts, driving controllable pitch propellers; 1 × 1 MW bow thruster
- Speed: France: In excess of 27 knots (50 km/h; 31 mph); Italy: In excess of 30 knots (56 km/h; 35 mph)
- Range: France: 6,000 nmi (11,000 km; 6,900 mi) at 15 knots (28 km/h; 17 mph); Italy: 6,800 nmi (12,600 km; 7,800 mi) at 15 knots (28 km/h; 17 mph)
- Complement: France: 145; Italy: 199 GP version / 201 ASW version
- Crew: France: 123 crew on average including the air crew; Italy: 131 GP version / 133 ASW version; add 14 crew for one helo on board or add 23 crew for two helicopters on board
- Sensors & processing systems: France: Héraklès multi-purpose passive electronically scanned array radar; Hull-mounted Thales USM 4110 sonar; CAPTAS-4 towed system combining low-frequency active sonar and passive array; Italy: Leonardo Kronos Grand Naval (MFRA) active electronically scanned array radar; Thales UMS 4110 CL hull sonar; Thales UMS 4249 CAPTAS-4 towed sonar (on Italian ASW variants)
- Armament: Anti-air missiles: France: 4 FREMM-ASW (Aquitaine, Provence, Languedoc, Auvergne) with 16-cell MBDA SYLVER A43 VLS for 16 MBDA Aster 15 missiles; 2 FREMM-ASW (Bretagne and Normandie) fitted with 16-cell MBDA SYLVER A50 VLS for 16 MBDA Aster 15 or 30 missiles; 2 FREMM-AAW (Alsace and Lorraine) fitted with 32-cell MBDA SYLVER A50 VLS for 32 MBDA Aster 15 or 30 missiles.; (as of 2025) 2 × 2 Sadral Mistral Simbad-RC point-defence SAM to be fit to all French vessels in due course; Italy: 16-cell MBDA SYLVER A50 VLS for 16 MBDA Aster 15 and 30 missiles; Guns: France: 1 × Leonardo OTO Melara 76 mm SR gun; Italy: 2 × Leonardo OTO Melara 76 mm/62 Davide/Strales guns (FREMM-ASW variant); 1 × Leonardo Otobreda 127/64 Vulcano and 1 × Leonardo OTO Melara 76 mm/62 Davide/Strales gun (FREMM-GP variant); Small guns: France: 3 × Nexter 20 mm Narwhal remote weapon systems; Italy: 2 × Leonardo OTO Melara 25/80 turret with Oerlikon KBA 25mm as remote weapon station; Anti-ship missiles: France: 8 × MBDA Exocet MM40 Block 3 anti-ship missiles (Block 3c variant entering service with the French Navy from December 2022); Italy: GP variant 8 × MBDA Teseo Mk-2/A anti-ship and land attack missiles; ASW variant 4 × MBDA Teseo Mk-2/A and 4 × MBDA MILAS anti-submarine missiles; Land-attack cruise missiles: France: 16-cell MBDA SYLVER A70 VLS for 16 MBDA MdCN land-attack cruise missiles (not fitted to two French AAW variants); Anti-submarine warfare: France: 2 × double Leonardo (WASS) B-515 launcher for MU 90 torpedoes; Italy: 2 × triple Leonardo (WASS) B-515/3 launcher for MU 90 torpedoes; Italy: 2 × SITEP MASS CS-424 acoustic guns (update since 2017)
- Aircraft carried: France: 1 × NH90 and 1 × Schiebel Camcopter S-100 unmanned air system; Italy: 2 × SH90 or 1 × SH90 and 1 × AW101 (armed with MU 90 torpedoes or MBDA Marte Mk2/S missiles)
- Aviation facilities: France: single hangar; Italy: double hangar
- Notes: Italy: 1 x RHIB SOLAS (Hatecke 7.5 m), 1 x RHIB Zodiac Hurricane 9.35 m and 1 RHIB CABAT 11 m on the stern

The European multi-purpose frigate or FREMM (French: Frégate Européenne Multi-Mission; Italian: Fregata Europea Multi-Missione) is a Franco-Italian family of warships designed by Naval Group and Fincantieri. This surface combatant is known in France as the Aquitaine class (17 units planned, of which 9 were later cancelled) and in Italy as the Bergamini class (10 units planned). The lead ship of the class, Aquitaine, was commissioned in November 2012 by the French Navy. Italy has ordered six general purpose and four anti-submarine variants. France, on the other hand, has ordered six anti-submarine variants and two air-defense ones.

The FREMM has also been exported to various countries. Prior to the cancellation of the project, the United States Navy had intended to use a FREMM variant for the Constellation class of 20 frigates.

== Background ==
Three original variants of the FREMM were proposed; an anti-submarine variant (ASW), a general-purpose variant (GP) and a land-attack variant (AVT) to replace the existing classes of frigates within the French and Italian navies. A total of 27 FREMM were to be constructed (17 for France and 10 for Italy) with additional aims to seek exports. However, budget cuts and changing requirements saw this number drop significantly for France, while the order for Italy remained unchanged. The land-attack variant (AVT) was subsequently cancelled. Like the also-Fincantieri-designed U.S. Navy Freedom Class, the FREMM can be equipped with two versions of the Surface Warfare Package, one of which includes some features the theoretical AVT variant would have offered.

A third anti-air warfare variant of FREMM was proposed by DCNS in response to French requirements for a new air-defence frigate, the new variant became known as FREDA ("FREgates de Défense Aériennes", "Air defence frigate"). This new French requirement was due to the third and fourth Horizon-class frigates being cancelled after the first two cost €1.35B each, but this decision left the French Navy still in-need of replacements for its aging Cassard-class air-defence frigates.

As of 2009, the FREDA design features a more powerful version of the Héraklès passive electronically scanned array radar and 32 cells of SYLVER A50 vertical launch system in place of the 16 cells of A43 and 16 cells of A70. The SYLVER A50 would allow it to fire the 120-kilometre (75 mi)-range Aster 30 missile. While at one point it was determined that the towed array sonar would not be fitted, this has subsequently been retained on the FREDA design.

At Euronaval 2012 DCNS showed a new concept called FREMM-ER for the FREDA requirement, again based on the FREMM, but specifically mentioning the ballistic missile defense mission as well as anti-air warfare. FREMM-ER has a modified superstructure replacing Héraklès with the new Thales Sea Fire 500 radar, whose four fixed plates resemble those of the US Navy's AN/SPY-1. However, unlike the Héraklès and the SPY-1 (both using passive electronically scanned array technology), the Sea Fire 500 has active electronically scanned array antennas.

=== Italy ===
Initial planning assumptions for the Italian Navy are ten FREMM-IT (four ASW variants and six GP variants) at a cost of €5.9 billion. FREMM-IT will replace the Maestrale and Lupo-class frigates in service with the Italian Navy.

In the 2013 Italian budget, the Italian government laid out the necessary financing for two more GP variants (FREMM-IT 7 & 8) and the contract was awarded in September 2013. On 15 April 2015, the Italian Parliament confirmed the deal between OCCAR and Orizzonte Sistemi Navali Spa (Fincantieri and Finmeccanica, since 2017 Leonardo) to begin building units 9 and 10, for 764 million Euros.

As of 16 April 2015, the Italian government has approved funding for all ten FREMM-IT to be delivered to the Italian Navy (four ASW variants and six GP variants). FREMM-IT 9 & 10 will have undisclosed enhanced capabilities. All ten Italian FREMM-ITs have extended AAW capabilities, with SAAM-ESD CMS, Aster 30 and Aster 15 missiles for extended area defence. SAAM-ESD CMS use Leonardo MFRA, a 3D active radar (AESA), an evolved version of the Leonardo EMPAR PESA radar (previously embarked on Horizon-class destroyers and the Cavour). Since the seventh FREMM-IT, there will be updates, such as new conformal IFF antenna and much more stealth response. Since the ninth FREMM-IT, SCLAR-H was replaced with Leonardo ODLS-20. In 2017 the Italian FREMM refit started with the installation on each of two SITEP MS-424 acoustic guns.

In 2020, Italy sold its last two FREMM-class frigates in the current production line (Spartaco Schergat and Emilio Bianchi) to Egypt. Spartaco Schergat was in the final stage of her sea trials while Emilio Bianchi would follow within one year. The deal reportedly also involved other military equipment and was worth US$1.2 billion. Italy then order two additional FREMM frigates to replace those transferred to Egypt with the anticipated delivery of the replacements by 2025, with a new GP&ASW enhanced configuration, named GP-e.

On 31 July 2024, Italy ordered at a cost of €1.5 billion another two FREMM from OCCAR, named FREMM-EVO, bringing the class fleet to twelve vessels. The FREMM-EVO will be based on the FREMM-ASW hull with several changes: PPA's dual-band integrated X- & C-band radar, ATBM capability with Aster 30B1NT missiles, CAPTAS-4 variable depth sonar (VDS), two Lionfish 30 mm autocannons to replace 25/80 mm, etc.

=== France ===
The original plan was for 17 FREMM to replace the nine D'Estienne d'Orves-class avisos and nine anti-submarine frigates of the Tourville and Georges Leygues classes. In November 2005 France announced a contract of €3.5 billion for development and the first eight hulls, with options for nine more costing €2.95 billion split over two tranches (totaling 17).

Following the cancellation of the third and fourth of the Horizon-class frigates in 2005 on budget grounds, requirements for an air-defence derivative of the FREMM called FREDA were placed – with DCNS coming up with several proposals. Expectations were that the last two ships of the 17 FREMM planned would be built to FREDA specifications; however, by 2008 the plan was revised down to just 11 FREMM (9 ASW variants and 2 FREDA variants) at a cost of €8.75 billion (FY13, ~US$12 billion). The 11 ships would cost €670 million (~US$760m) each in FY2014, or €860m (~US$980m) including development costs.

The 2013 White Paper on Defence and National Security committed France to 15 front-line frigates, which was initially interpreted as 2 Horizons, 5 La Fayettes and a reduction in the FREMM fleet down to 8 ships. The 2014–2019 defence plan restated a target of 11 frigates; of which six ASW FREMM variants would be delivered to replace the Georges Leygues-class frigates by 2019, followed by two anti-air variants to replace the ageing Cassard-class frigates and a decision was to have been taken in 2016 on what version the remaining three would be. In 2014, the French Navy's Chief of Staff, Admiral Bernard Rogel, confirmed that 11 FREMM frigates had been ordered but in 2015 the order was cut to 8 in order to allow for the introduction of five FTI mid-Size frigates from 2024. The FTI will replace the La Fayette class in "first-rank" roles, with three of the La Fayettes also being fitted with active sonar and other improvements so as to extend their service life into the early 2030s.

On 16 April 2021 the French Navy received Alsace, the first of the two air defence FREMM frigates ordered. The primary role of the air defence frigates is conducting the anti-aircraft defense of critical units such as the French aircraft carrier Charles de Gaulle and Mistral class landing helicopter docks. Besides being equipped with Aster 15 and Aster 30 surface-to-air missiles, the ship holds Exocet MM 40 anti-ship missiles and the MU 90 torpedo system.

=== Export ===
Operators of the FREMM frigates

==== United States ====
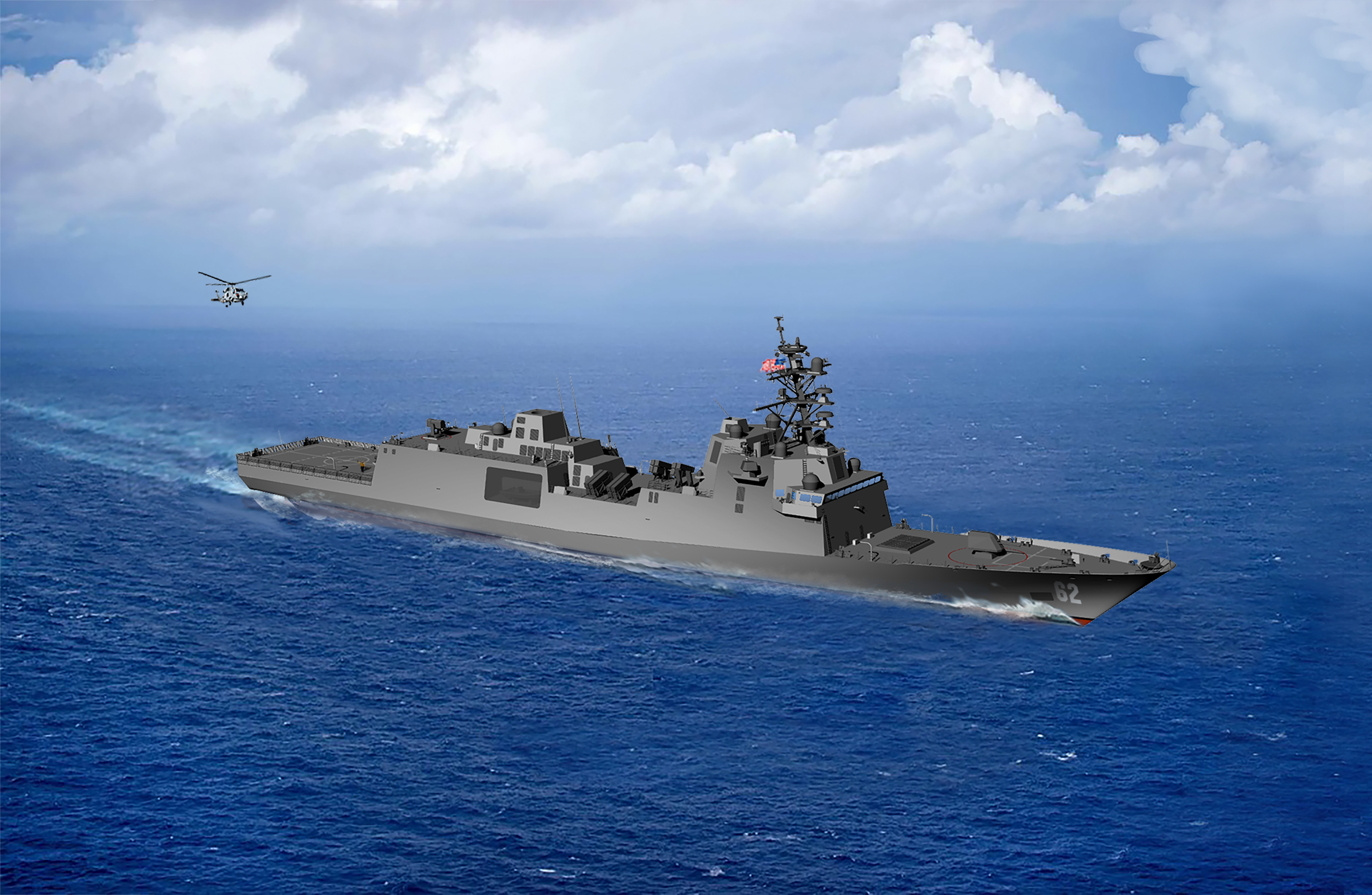
An artist's rendering of a Constellation-class frigate

On 10 July 2017, it was reported that the United States Congress was interested in foreign designs such as the Fincantieri FREMM for the US Navy's FFG(X) Program. According to Representative Rob Wittman, chairman of the United States House Armed Services Subcommittee on Seapower and Projection Forces, the US Congress was comfortable with models such as Fincantieri's partnership with Lockheed Martin to build the Freedom version of the littoral combat ship (LCS). If the Italian FREMM design is selected, the Marinette Marine shipyard in Wisconsin, part of the Fincantieri group, would build the guided-missile frigates. Marinette Marine is best known for the US Navy Freedom-class LCS. On 16 February 2018, Fincantieri Marine was one of five companies awarded a $15 million contract for conceptual design of FFG(X), which the Navy would evaluate over 16 months ahead of a final request for proposal in 2019 and contract award in 2020.

On 30 June 2017, it was announced that Leonardo and BAE Systems will collaborate to provide the US military forces with a wide range of upgraded munitions for advanced, large-calibre weapon systems such as the Leonardo Vulcano and Strales/DART guided munitions.

From late May to early June 2018, the Italian Navy deployed Alpino on a good will visit to the United States along the Eastern seaboard, making port calls in Norfolk, Baltimore, New York City, and Boston. She was visited by several US Navy officials who toured her as a potential FFG(X) candidate. Among the visitors was the Italian Ambassador to the United States, Armando Varricchio.

On 30 April 2020, the US Navy announced that Fincantieri had been awarded a $795 million contract for the first FFG(X), to be built at Fincantieri Marinette Marine in Marinette, Wisconsin. The contract includes options for an additional nine ships, which, if all options were exercised, would value the contract at $5.5 billion. On 7 October 2020, US Secretary of the Navy Kenneth Braithwaite announced that first FFG(X) frigate would be named Constellation.

On 25 November 2025, the Constellation class was cancelled, allegedly due to the amount of changes the USN made to the off-the-shelf FREMM design, reducing the time- and cost-savings.

==== Egypt ====
Egypt ordered two Italian FREMM frigates in 2020 and one French FREMM frigate in 2015. On 16 February 2015, the Egyptian Navy ordered one FREMM vessel to enter service before the opening of the New Suez Canal, as part of a larger deal (including 24 Dassault Rafale aircraft and a supply of missiles) worth US$5.9 billion (€5.2 billion). In order to keep to Egypt's deadlines, France offered to send Normandie, originally intended for the French Navy. The SYLVER A70 VLS and NETTUNO-4100 jamming equipment were removed due to export limitations for such sensitive equipment. The crew will be around 126 sailors compared to 108 in the French Navy. The SATCOM antenna for the French Syracuse satellites was also taken down; however, Egypt will use its own military telecommunications satellite, supplied by Airbus Defence and Space and Thales Alenia Space, in conjunction with its naval vessels. From March 2015, DCNS trained the Egyptian crew in the technology of the ship and DCNS and its partners accompanied the crew for a period of 15 months. On 23 June 2015, French naval shipbuilder DCNS transferred the FREMM frigate Tahya Misr (ex-Normandie) to the Egyptian Navy. A ceremony took place to transfer Normandie, renamed Tahya Misr ("Long Live Egypt") to Egypt, in the presence of General Sedki Sobhy, the Egyptian Minister of Defense, Jean-Yves Le Drian, the French Minister of Defense, Admiral Osama Rabie, Egyptian Navy Commander in Chief, Admiral Bernard Rogel, the French Chief of Navy and Hervé Guillou, Chairman & CEO of DCNS. The initial Italian sale might be followed by the subsequent acquisition of two additional FREMM frigates by Egypt. In April 2021, the second FREMM Bergamini-class frigate, ENS Bernees, joined the Egyptian Navy. The first one joined on 31 December 2020.

==== Morocco ====
On 24 October 2007, it was announced that the Royal Moroccan Navy had ordered one FREMM to replace its Descubierta-class corvette. The contract was signed on 18 April 2008 and construction of the Moroccan FREMM began in the summer 2008 with delivery expected in 2012 or 2013; Mohammed VI was launched in September 2011 and handed over on 30 January 2014. The Moroccan ship is similar to the French anti-submarine version, without SYLVER A70 tubes for MdCN cruise missile, and cost €470m.

==== Indonesia ====
On 10 June 2021, Indonesia signed a contract with Fincantieri for the order of six FREMM frigates and two Maestrale-class frigates and other logistical support. There may be collaboration between PT-PAL Shipyard on Java and Fincantieri.

==== Greece ====
Following the unsuccessful negotiations of 2009–2018, which fell through due to the Greek economic crisis, in April 2025 Greek Minister for National Defence Nikos Dendias announced to the Delphi Economic Forum. Greece would again seek to purchase two used FREMM frigates from Italy, as part of the country's €25 billion multi-year defence plan. On 29 September 2025, the intent was formalised by signing a naval cooperation agreement for 2+2 frigates, between Greece and Fincantieri who will upgrade and modernise the first two Bergamini class vessels (Carlo Bergamini-GP and Virginio Fasan-ASW) and the follow-on option of two more. With the signing of the MoU, Greece will proceed with the specific requirements of the armament suite, to allow compatibility with systems on the FDI Kimon-class frigates. The Italian Teseo anti-ship missiles will probably be replaced with Exocet or Harpoon, while there is interest in the new ELSA missile system also to be integrated. The first ship is expected to be handed over before 2029, as Italy receives its first FREMM EVO replacement.

Greece will buy two used FREMM frigates of the Bergamini class from Italy as part of its Armed Forces modernization program. The agreement to officially activate the purchase signed on September 8, 2026, in Rome. The ships that will join the Greek Navy are the "Carlo Bergamini" and "Virginio Fasan" frigates, currently belonging to the Italian Navy. Both entered service in 2013 and will be delivered to Greece in first half of 2028 and first half of 2029 respectively. The "Carlo Bergamini" frigate measures 144 meters in length and has a displacement of 6,700 tons. It is equipped with an OTO Melara gun, 16 cells for Aster 15 and Aster 30 surface-to-air missiles, Otomat Teseo anti-ship missiles, and MU90 torpedoes for anti-submarine operations. On the other hand, the "Virginio Fasan" ship is specially prepared for anti-submarine warfare, as it has MILAS anti-submarine missile launchers and specific equipment to detect and combat submarines.

Τhe cost of the two frigates with 5 years supporting will be up to € 460m "as it is- where it is", but there will be many changes for the Greek Navy.

==== Portugal ====
On July 20, 2026, Italian's Prime Minister Giorgia Meloni said Portugal has decided to buy three frigates built by Italian shipbuilder Fincantieri. She stated the deal as a boost for Europe's defence industry. She made the comments in the presence of Portuguese premier Luis Montenegro. Portuguese Premier stated that the €3.9Bn investment was to "improve the capability to monitor Portuguese maritime resources and safeguard our strategic interests".

=== Unsuccessful bids ===
==== Canada ====
In April 2013, the French government showcased the FREMM class in Halifax, Nova Scotia, with the hope of selling to the Royal Canadian Navy for the Single Class Surface Combatant Project.

In September 2017, a variant of the FREMM was offered directly to the Ministry of Defence, in an attempt to protect intellectual property. This direct bid included delivery of the first ship in 2019 if accepted within the year and a fixed price of $30 billion for all 15 ships, versus the $62 billion estimated for the government's prime-contractor ship building plan. In December 2017 the offer was rejected by the Public Services and Procurement Canada, citing the unsolicited nature of the bid as undermining the fair and competitive nature of the procurement". In October 2018, the Type 26 design was chosen by Canada as the winner of the program. On 8 February 2019, a contract was signed by Canada to build Type 26 vessels.

==== Australia ====
In April 2016, Prime Minister Malcolm Turnbull confirmed that the Italian FREMM class was one of three frigates shortlisted for the Royal Australian Navy's Anzac-class frigate replacement. In September 2016, Fincantieri signed a contract to participate in the Competitive Evaluation Process, conducted by the Department of Defence for nine Future Frigates for the Royal Australian Navy. In June 2018, the contract was awarded to BAE Systems to produce up to six Hunter-class frigates based on the British Type 26 frigate, of which three units were ordered in June 2024.

==== Brazil ====
In January 2019, the Italian government made an offer of two Bergamini-class frigates to the Brazilian Navy. The frigates Spartaco Schergat and Emilio Bianchi under construction for the Italian Navy, would be transferred to Brazil for €1.5 billion (R$6.37 billion).

==== Greece ====
On 22 January 2009 the Hellenic Navy announced an order for six FREMM to replace an equal number of Elli-class frigates. After the Greek government-debt crisis this was cut down to between two and four ships equipped with SCALP Naval, with France alleged to have offered them to Greece at no cost for the first five years. Germany objected to this deal in October 2011 and no deal has been signed. In February 2013 though and during the formal visit of the President of France, François Hollande, in Athens, according to press reports an agreement which includes the long-term leasing of two FREMM frigates (Normandie and Provence according to initial reports) to the Hellenic Navy has been reached. On 12 January 2018 the Greek daily newspaper Kathimerini reported that the Greek government was set to enter talks with France regarding the procurement of two FREMM frigates, with an option for an additional two. Contacts between Greece and France were to begin initially at a military level, starting in February 2018. In April 2018, Greek deputy Minister for National Defence Fotis Kouvelis stated that an agreement between France and Greece was reached for a five-year lease of two FREMM frigates, which could have been handed over as early as August 2018. After a few days, on 25 April 2018 the Greek minister of Defense Panos Kammenos denied any information regarding the purchase of two frigates from France. Eventually, Greece abandoned all plans for the purchase of FREMMs in 2019 and pursued with the smaller FDI Belharra multi-purpose frigates, offered by Naval Group.

== Country-specific equipment ==
=== Common equipment ===
- Leonardo OTO Melara 76 mm (3.0 in)/62 calibre gun (compact for FR-ASW/Super Rapid gun with Davide/Strales guided ammunition for IT-ASW)
- 2 × torpedo launchers Eurotorp/WASS B515/3 for MU 90 torpedoes with Calzoni AHS (Automatic Handling System)
- 1 × Leonardo NA-25 DARDO-F fire control system for the 76 mm cannon
- 2 × SLAT (Systeme de Lutte Anti-Torpille) anti-torpedo system (into Italian Navy only for ASW version) ASW DLS (Anti Submarine Weapon Decoy Launcher System) based on Thales ALERT sonar system, DCNS RATO command system and WASS CMAT weapon system (with 12 tube launcher for 127 mm's WASS C-310 decoy and jammers)
- NH90 helicopter, with capability for AW101, Cougar and Caracal
- Thales UMS 4110 CL hull sonar
- Thales UMS 4249 CAPTAS-4 towed sonar (Italian anti-submarine versions only; fitted to both French ASW and air defence variants)
- Thales TUUM-6 Underwater Telephone
- 2 × Sigen MM/SMQ-765 EW system: with JASS (Jamming Antenna Sub System) ECM, Nettuno 4100, by ELT Elettronica and Thales ESM (Communications and Radar ESM)
- 2 × SOFRESUD Quick Pointing Devices "QPD"

=== French-specific equipment ===
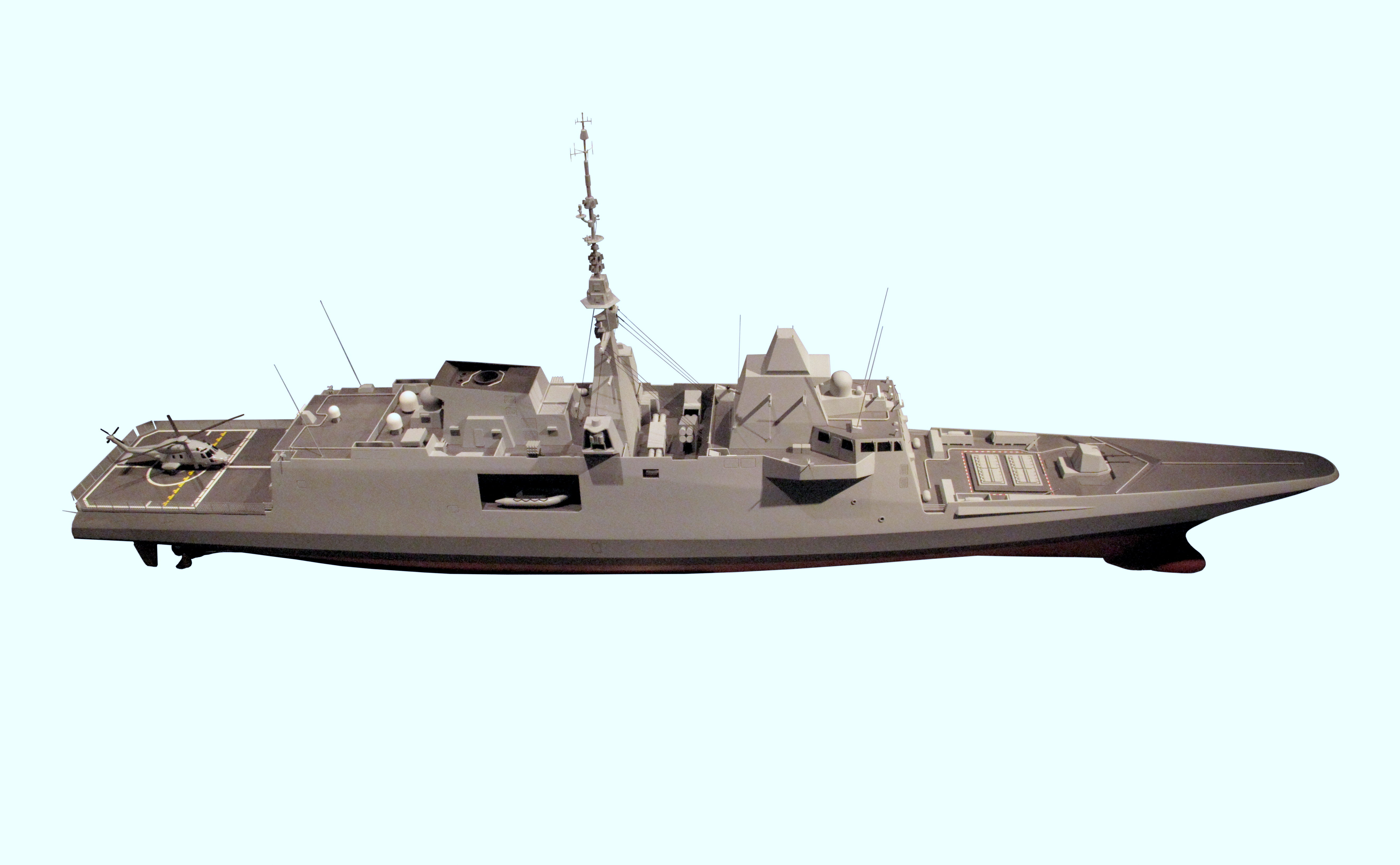
French version of the FREMM

- 16-cell MBDA SYLVER A43 VLS for MBDA Aster 15 missiles (in first four ASW variants)
  - The last two ASW variants have been fitted with a 16-cell MBDA A50 VLS for MBDA Aster 30 to be used if deemed necessary.
  - The two AAW variants fitted with 32-cell A50 VLS.
- 16-cell MBDA SYLVER A70 VLS for MBDA MdCN cruise missile with a range up to 1,400 km (870 mi) or Aster 30 anti-air missile (not fitted to AAW variants)
- MBDA Exocet MM40 Block 3, (Block 3c variant - naval and land-attack capability - entering service with the French Navy from December 2022)
- 2 × 2 Sadral Mistral Simbad-RC point-defence SAM (as of 2025 to be retrofit on all French vessels)
- 2 × Nexter 20 mm (0.79 in) Narwhal remote weapon systems
- NGDS decoy launcher
- Héraklès radar
- Terma Scanter 2001 radar
- Thales Artemis IRST
- SETIS combat system
- Sagem Najir fire control system for the 76 mm gun (initially on French ASW variants); being replaced by Thales STIR 1.2 EO MK2 fire control radar on all French ASW variants as of 2025
- Thales STIR EO MK 2 fire control radar for 76 mm gun (on French AAW variants from build)
- 4 × torpedo launchers Eurotorp/WASS B515/3 for MU 90 torpedoes
- Samahé helicopter handling system

=== Italian-specific equipment ===
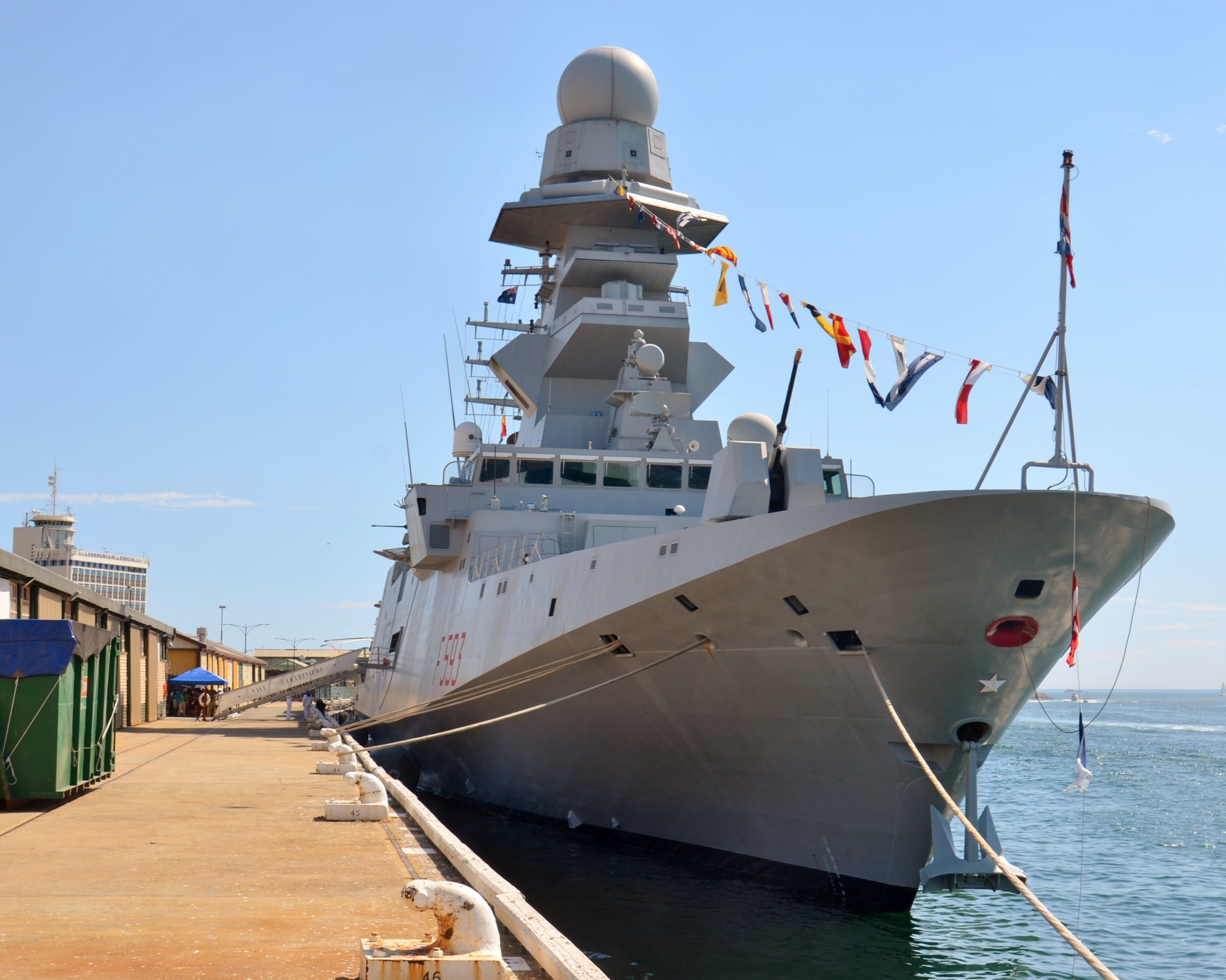
Italian ASW FREMM Carabiniere

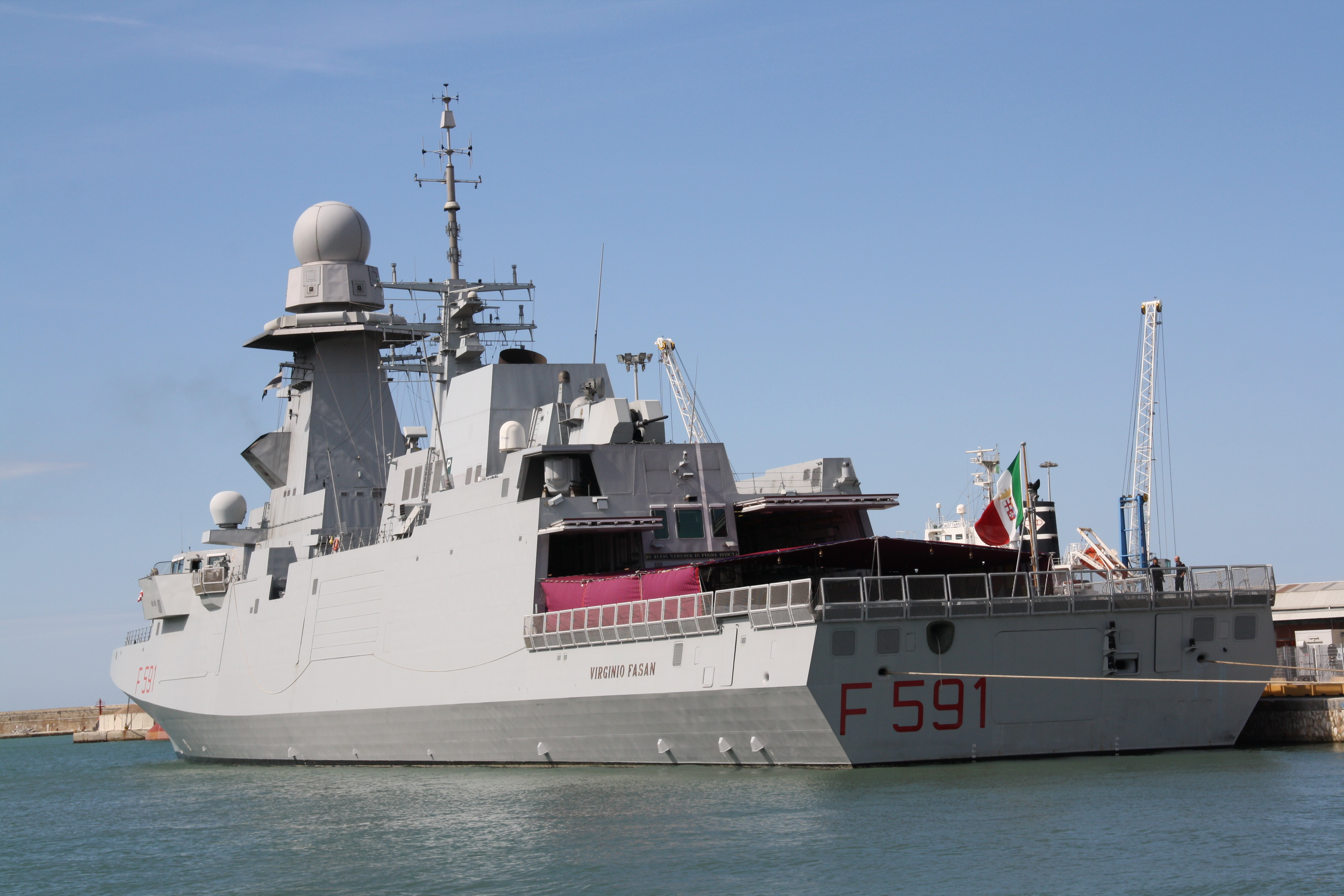
Italian ASW FREMM Virginio Fasan

- 16-cell MBDA SYLVER A50 VLS for MBDA Aster 15 missiles and MBDA Aster 30 missiles
- Leonardo IRST SASS
- another one Leonardo NA-25 DARDO-F fire control system for the second cannon (76 mm/62 calibre or 127 mm (5.0 in)/54 calibre gun)
- Leonardo Kronos Grand Naval (MFRA) AESA, 3D, C band radar
- Leonardo RASS (RAN-30X-I) surface radar (OTH)
- Leonardo SPS-732, 2D LPI Surveillance X band radar (surface and air surveillance at low level); since the seventh FREMM-IT replaced by more powerful Leonardo SPS-732(V2)
- Leonardo SPN-730 LPI navigation radar and two navigation radar GEM-Elettronica MM/SPN-753
- Leonardo SPN-720 radar for helicopter precision approach
- Leonardo IFF SIR M-E; since the 7th FREMM-IT replaced with Leonardo IFF SIR M5-PA with phased array antenna
- Leonardo Athena combat system (CMS), with 21, three displays, MFC (Multi Functional Consolle): 17 into COC, 2 in backup COC, 1 on bridge and 1 into Command Planning Room
- Leonardo SAAM-ESD extended area AAW combat system (for Aster 15 and Aster 30 missiles)
- 2 × Leonardo (OTO Melara) SCLAR-H DLS Multipurpose Rocket Launcher; since the 7th vessel replaced with Leonardo ODLS-20
- GP version: 8 × MBDA Teseo Mk-2/A, for naval and land attack missiles
- ASW version: 4 × MBDA Teseo Mk-2/A missiles and 4 × MBDA MILAS anti-submarine missiles
- 2 × OTO Melara - Oerlikon KBA 25 mm (0.98 in)/80 calibre remote weapon system, controlled by close CMS
- Curtiss-Wright TC-ASIST helicopter handling system (for both helicopters)
- Leonardo (WASS) SNA-2000-I mine avoidance sonar
- L-3 ELAC Nautik SeaBeam 3050, multi-beam echo sounder (only on ASW version)
- 1 × 7 m (23 ft) rigid-hulled inflatable boat release and recovery lateral systems (Stemar 6.8 m (22 ft), FNM HPEP 225 hp (168 kW) engine, 38 knots (70 km/h; 44 mph), 6 crew)
- 1 × 11 m (36 ft) rigid-hulled inflatable boat release and recovery lateral systems (Zodiac Hurricane)
- 1 × 11 m rigid-hulled inflatable boat fast, stern release and recovery system (only on GP version, for CABI Cattaneo CABAT boat)
- ASW version: 2 × Leonardo OTO Melara 76 mm/62 calibre Davide/Strales CIWS guns, one on the hangar (both with Strales guided ammunition)
- GP version: 1 × Leonardo OTO Melara 127 mm/64 calibre gun with Vulcano guided ammunition, with a range up to 120 km (75 mi), and AAHS (Automated Ammunition Handling System) with 350 rounds + 56 in turret and a second Leonardo (OTO Melara) 76 mm/62 calibre Davide/Strales CIWS gun on the hangar (with Strales guided-ammunition)
- 2 × acoustic guns / LRAD SITEP MASS CS-424: since year 2017, on update works

== Ships of the class ==
=== French production ===
All the ships were made by the DCNS shipyard in Lorient.

Name	No.	Variant	Role	Contract signed	Laid down	Launched	Comm.	Transferred	Homeport	Notes
French Navy Aquitaine class
Aquitaine	D650	FR‑ASW	ASW (Anti-submarine warfare)	16 Nov 2005	Dec 2007	29 Apr 2010	2 Dec 2015	–	Brest	
Normandie	D651	FR‑ASW	ASW (Anti-submarine warfare)	16 Nov 2005	2014	1 Feb 2018	3 Jun 2020	–	Brest	
Provence	D652	FR‑ASW	ASW (Anti-submarine warfare)	16 Nov 2005	15 Dec 2010	18 Sep 2013	9 Jun 2016	–	Toulon	
Languedoc	D653	FR‑ASW	ASW (Anti-submarine warfare)	16 Nov 2005	30 Nov 2011	12 Jul 2014	4 Jul 2017	–	Toulon	
Auvergne	D654	FR‑ASW	ASW (Anti-submarine warfare)	16 Nov 2005	Aug 2012	2 Sep 2015	14 Feb 2018	–	Brest	
Bretagne	D655	FR‑ASW	ASW (Anti-submarine warfare)	16 Nov 2005	Oct 2013	16 Sep 2016	20 Feb 2019	–	Brest	
Alsace	D656	FR‑AAW	Anti‑air warfare	16 Nov 2005	Mar 2018	18 Apr 2019	16 Apr 2021	–	Toulon	
Lorraine	D657	FR‑AAW	Anti‑air warfare	16 Nov 2005	15 May 2019	13 Nov 2020	13 Nov 2023	–	Toulon	
Egyptian Navy
Tahya Misr (ex-Normandie)	FFG-1001	FR‑ASW	ASW (Anti-submarine warfare)	16 Nov 2005 (French order) 16 Feb 2015 (transfer contract)	8 Oct 2008	18 Oct 2012	17 Mar 2016	–	Alexandria	Never entered service in the French Navy
Royal Moroccan Navy
Mohammed VI	701	FR‑ASW	ASW (Anti-submarine warfare)	24 Oct 2007	12 Dec 2008	14 Sep 2011	30 Jan 2014	–	Ksar es Seghir	

=== Italian production ===
All the ships were made and are being produced by the Fincantieri shipyards in Muggiano and Riva Trigoso.

Name	No.	Variant	Role	Contract signed	Laid down	Launched	Comm.	Transferred	Homeport	Notes
Italian Navy Bergamini class
Carlo Bergamini	F590	GP	General purpose	9 May 2006	7 Jan 2008	16 Jul 2011	29 May 2013	2028 to Hellenic Navy	Taranto	
Virginio Fasan	F591	IT‑ASW	ASW (Anti-submarine warfare)	9 May 2006	17 Dec 2009	31 Mar 2012	19 Dec 2013	2029 to Hellenic Navy	La Spezia	
Carlo Margottini	F592	IT‑ASW	ASW (Anti-submarine warfare)	1 Feb 2008	21 Apr 2010	29 Jun 2013	27 Feb 2014	–	La Spezia	
Carabiniere	F593	IT‑ASW	ASW (Anti-submarine warfare)	1 Feb 2008	28 Sep 2011	29 Mar 2014	28 Apr 2015	–	Taranto	
Alpino	F594	IT‑ASW	ASW (Anti-submarine warfare)	1 Feb 2008	23 Feb 2012	13 Dec 2014	30 Sep 2016	–	Taranto	
Luigi Rizzo	F595	GP	General purpose	1 Feb 2008	5 Mar 2013	19 Dec 2015	20 Apr 2017	–	La Spezia	
Federico Martinengo	F596	GP	General purpose	Sep 2013	4 Jun 2014	4 Mar 2017	24 Apr 2018	–	Taranto	
Antonio Marceglia	F597	GP	General purpose	Sep 2013	9 Jul 2015	3 Feb 2018	16 Apr 2019	–	La Spezia	
Spartaco Schergat	F598	GP-e	General purpose enhanced (for ASW)	16 Apr 2015 (Italian order) 2021 (replacement Egypt transfer)	25 Feb 2021	24 Nov 2023	15 Apr 2025	–	La Spezia	
Emilio Bianchi	F599	GP-e	General purpose enhanced (for ASW)	16 Apr 2015 (Italian order) 2021 (replacement Egypt transfer)	10 Dec 2021	25 May 2024	30 Jul 2025	–	La Spezia	
Bersagliere	TBA	FREMM-EVO	General purpose & ASW	31 Jul 2024	8 Jul 2025	Dec 2027	Jun 2029	–	TBA	
Aviere	TBA	FREMM-EVO	General purpose & ASW	31 Jul 2024	23 Jul 2026	–	Jun 2030	–	TBA	
Egyptian Navy
Al-Galala (ex-Spartaco Schergat)	FFG-1002	GP	General Purpose	16 Apr 2015 (Italian order) Oct 2020 (transfer contract)	21 Dec 2015	26 Jan 2019	23 Dec 2020	23 Dec 2020	Alexandria	Never entered service in the Italian Navy
Bernees (ex-Emilio Bianchi)	FFG-1003	GP	General Purpose	16 Apr 2015 (Italian order) Oct 2020 (transfer contract)	Jan 2018	25 Jan 2020	13 Apr 2021	13 Apr 2021	Alexandria	Never entered service in the Italian Navy
Hellenic Navy
Carlo Bergamini	F590	GP	General purpose	9 May 2006 (Italy) 24 Oct 2025 (transfer contract)	7 Jan 2008	16 Jul 2011	29 May 2013	~ 2028 to Hellenic Navy	–	Second-hand ships that will be around 16 years old when transferred.
Virginio Fasan	F591	IT‑ASW	ASW (Anti-submarine warfare)	9 May 2006 (Italy) 24 Oct 2025 (transfer contract)	17 Dec 2009	31 Mar 2012	19 Dec 2013	~ 2028 to Hellenic Navy	–	Second-hand ships that will be around 16 years old when transferred.
Portuguese Navy
TBA	TBA	FREMM-EVO	General purpose & ASW	20 Jul 2026	–	–	–	–	TBA	
TBA	TBA	FREMM-EVO	General purpose & ASW	20 Jul 2026	–	–	–	–	TBA	
TBA	TBA	FREMM-EVO	General purpose & ASW	20 Jul 2026	–	–	–	–	TBA	

Planned dates

=== United States production ===
Name	No.	Builder	Variant	Role	Contract signed	Laid down	Launched	Comm.	Homeport	Notes
United States Navy Constellation class
Constellation	FFG-62	Fincantieri FFM (Marinette - WI)	GMF (Guided Missile Frigate)	Multi role (ASW, ASuW, land attack)	30 Apr 2020	12 Apr 2024	–	2029	Everett	
Congress	FFG-63	Fincantieri FFM (Marinette - WI)	GMF (Guided Missile Frigate)	Multi role (ASW, ASuW, land attack)	21 May 2021	–	–	–	–	
Chesapeake	FFG-64	Fincantieri FFM (Marinette - WI)	GMF (Guided Missile Frigate)	Multi role (ASW, ASuW, land attack)	17 Jun 2022	–	–	–	–	Cancelled
Lafayette	FFG-65	Fincantieri FFM (Marinette - WI)	GMF (Guided Missile Frigate)	Multi role (ASW, ASuW, land attack)	19 May 2023	–	–	–	–	Cancelled
Hamilton	FFG-66	Fincantieri FFM (Marinette - WI)	GMF (Guided Missile Frigate)	Multi role (ASW, ASuW, land attack)	24 May 2024	–	–	–	–	Cancelled
Galvez	FFG-67	Fincantieri FFM (Marinette - WI)	GMF (Guided Missile Frigate)	Multi role (ASW, ASuW, land attack)	24 May 2024	–	–	–	–	Cancelled
Everett Alvarez Jr.	FFG-68	–	GMF (Guided Missile Frigate)	Multi role (ASW, ASuW, land attack)	2025	–	–	–	–	Cancelled
Joy Bright Hancock	FFG-69	–	GMF (Guided Missile Frigate)	Multi role (ASW, ASuW, land attack)	2026	–	–	–	–	Cancelled

== See also ==
- List of naval ship classes in service

=== Equivalent modern heavy frigates ===
- Type 26 frigate
- Type 31 frigate
- Iver Huitfeldt-class frigate
- Álvaro de Bazán-class frigate
- Thaon di Revel-class offshore patrol vessel
- De Zeven Provinciën-class frigate
- Baden-Württemberg-class frigate
- Type 054A frigate
- Victory-class multi-role combat vessel
- Nilgiri-class frigate
