= French frigate Auvergne =

FREMM class multi-purpose frigates in the French Navy

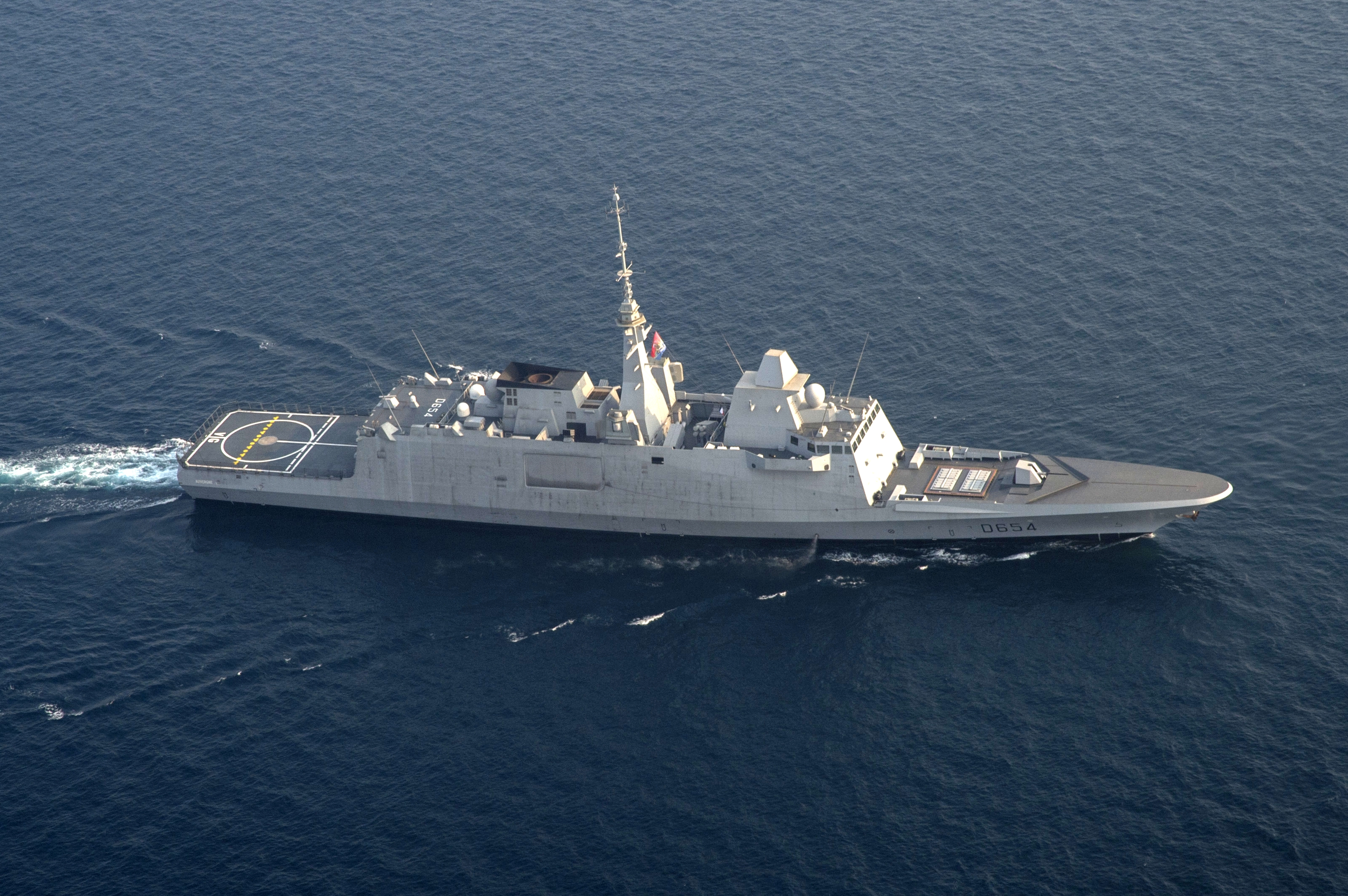
- Auvergne in the Persian Gulf on 19 September 2017

History

France
- Name: Auvergne
- Namesake: Auvergne
- Builder: DCNS, Lorient
- Laid down: August 2012
- Launched: 2 September 2015
- Completed: 11 April 2017
- Commissioned: 14 February 2018
- Home port: Brest
- Identification: MMSI number: 227999500; Pennant number: D654
- Status: Active

General characteristics
- Class & type: Aquitaine-class frigate
- Displacement: 6,000 tons
- Length: 466 ft (142.0 m)
- Beam: 65 ft (19.8 m)
- Draught: 16 ft (4.9 m)
- Propulsion: MTU Series 4000 (2,2 MW everyone); CODLOG
- Speed: 27 knots (50 km/h; 31 mph); max cruise speed 15.6 knots (28.9 km/h; 18.0 mph)
- Range: 6,000 nmi (11,000 km; 6,900 mi) at 15 knots (28 km/h; 17 mph)
- Complement: 145
- Sensors & processing systems: Héraklès multi-purpose passive electronically scanned array radar; CAPTAS-4 towed-array sonar; UMS 4110 CL hull-mounted sonar
- Armament: 1 x 76 mm Super Rapid gun; 3 x 20 mm Narwhal remote weapon systems; 16-cell SYLVER A43 VLS for Aster 15 air defense missiles; 16-cell SYLVER A70 VLS for MdCN cruise missiles; 8 x Exocet MM40 Block 3 anti-ship missiles (Block 3c variant entering service with the French Navy from December 2022); 2 x B-515 twin launchers for MU90 torpedoes
- Aircraft carried: 1 × NH90 helicopter
- Aviation facilities: Single hangar

Auvergne (D654) is an Aquitaine-class frigate of the French Navy. The Aquitaine class were developed from the FREMM multipurpose frigate program.

== Development and design ==
Original plans were for 17 FREMM to replace the nine D'Estienne d'Orves-class avisos and nine anti-submarine frigates of the Tourville and Georges Leygues classes. In November 2005 France announced a contract of €3.5 billion for development and the first eight hulls, with options for nine more costing €2.95 billion split over two tranches (totaling 17).

Following the cancellation of the third and fourth of the Horizon-class frigates in 2005 on budget grounds, requirements for an air-defence derivative of the FREMM called FREDA were placed – with DCNS coming up with several proposals. Expectations were that the last two ships of the 17 FREMM planned would be built to FREDA specifications; however, by 2008 the plan was revised down to just 11 FREMM (9 ASW variants and 2 FREDA variants) at a cost of €8.75 billion (FY13, ~US$12 billion). The 11 ships would cost €670 million (~US$760m) each in FY2014, or €860m (~US$980m) including development costs. In 2015, the total number of ASW variants was further reduced to just six units, including Auvergne.

== Construction and career ==
Auvergne was developed as part of a joint Italian-French program known as FREMM, which was implemented to develop a new class of frigates for use by various European navies. Constructed from 2012. The frigate Auvergne was launched on 2 September 2015 and commissioned in 2018.

In late 2021/early 2022, just prior to the Russian invasion of Ukraine, the frigate deployed to the Black Sea for exercises with the Bulgarian and other NATO navies. The frigate departed the Black Sea prior to the outbreak of hostilities.

She was initially home ported at Toulon, but transferred to the naval base at Brest in December 2022.

Views of Auvergne
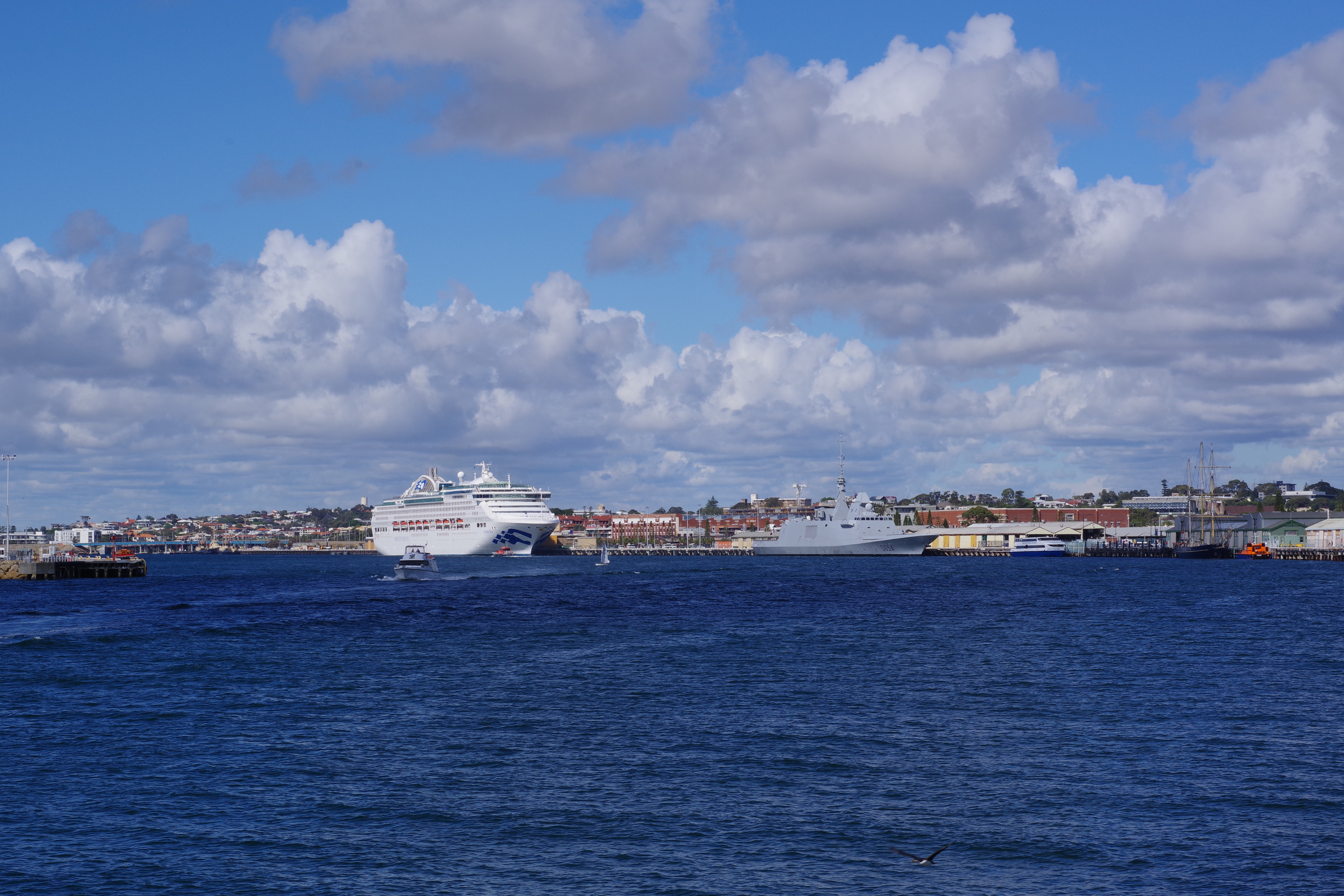
Auvergne at Fremantle on 18 November 2017.

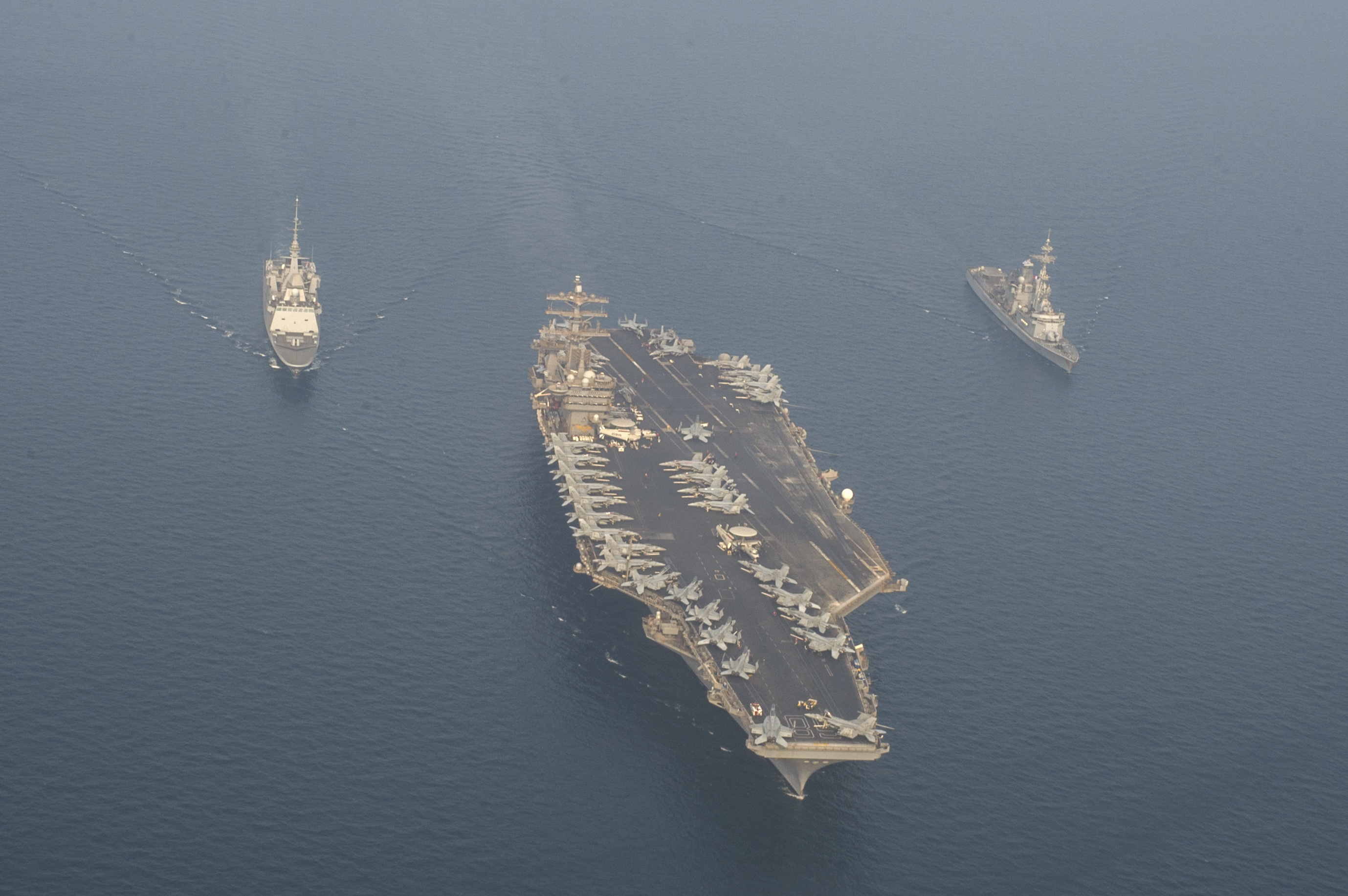
USS Nimitz and the frigates Jean Bart and Auvergne on 19 September 2017.

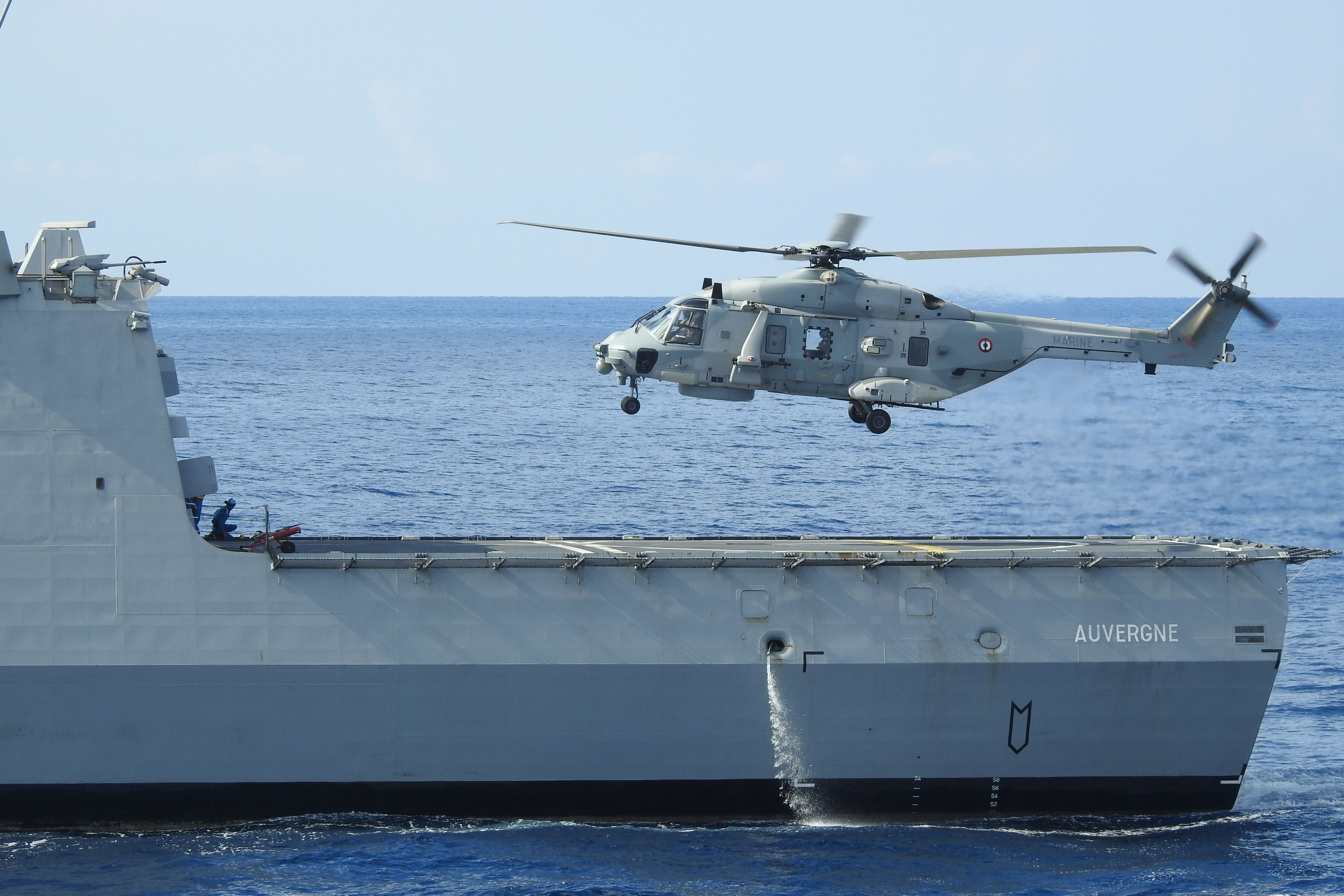
NHIndustries NH90 helicopter of the French Naval Aviation landing on Auvergne.
