= ENS Al-Galala =

FREMM class multi-purpose frigates in the Italian Navy

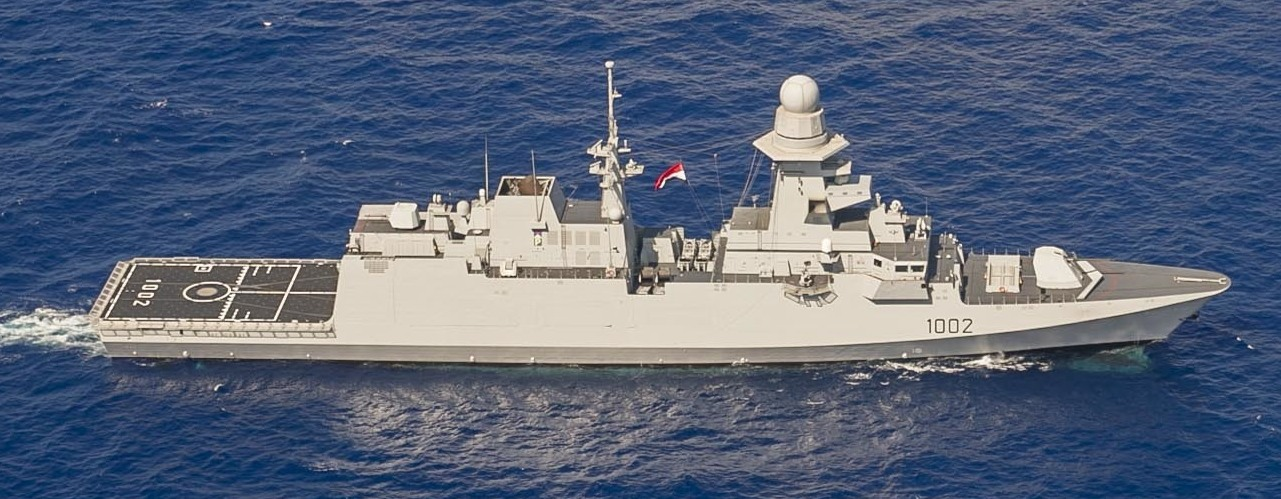
- ENS Al-Galala in 2022

History

Egypt
- Name: Al-Galala; (الجلالة)
- Namesake: Al-Galala
- Builder: Fincantieri, Riva Trigoso and Muggiano
- Laid down: 21 December 2015
- Launched: 26 January 2019
- Acquired: 23 December 2020
- Commissioned: 23 December 2020
- Renamed: from Spartaco Schergat
- Home port: Alexandria
- Identification: Hull number: FFG 1002
- Status: Active

General characteristics
- Class & type: Carlo Bergamini-class frigate
- Displacement: 6,700 tons
- Length: 144.6 ft (44.1 m)
- Beam: 19.7 ft (6.0 m)
- Draught: 8.7 ft (2.7 m)
- Propulsion: CODLAG; 1 × 32 MW gas turbine General Electric/Avio LM2500+G4; 2 × 2.5 MW electric motors Jeumont Electric; 4 × diesel generators; VL 1716 (T2ME series by 2.15 MW everyone, on first two frigate; HPCR series by 2.8 MW everyone, since the third frigate); 2 × shafts, driving controllable pitch propellers; 1 × 1 MW bow thruster
- Speed: 27 knots (50 km/h; 31 mph); max cruise speed 15.6 knots (28.9 km/h; 18.0 mph)
- Range: 6,800 nmi (12,600 km; 7,800 mi) at 15 knots (28 km/h; 17 mph)
- Complement: 199
- Sensors & processing systems: Leonardo Kronos Grand Naval (MFRA) Active electronically scanned array radar; UMS 4110 CL hull-mounted sonar
- Armament: 16-cell MBDA SYLVER A50 VLS for 16 MBDA Aster 15 and 30 missiles; 1 × Leonardo Otobreda 127/64 Vulcano; 1 × Leonardo OTO Melara 76/62 mm Davide/Strales CIWS gun; 2 × Leonardo Oto Melara/Oerlikon KBA 25/80 mm remote weapon systems; 8 × MBDA Teseo\Otomat Mk-2/A anti-ship and land attack missiles; 2 x triple Leonardo (WASS) B-515/3 launcher for MU 90 torpedoes; 2 x SITEP MASS CS-424 acoustic guns
- Aircraft carried: 2 × SH90; 1 × SH90; 1 × AW101 (armed with MU 90 torpedoes or MBDA Marte Mk2/S missiles)
- Aviation facilities: Double hangar

ENS Al-Galala (FFG 1002) is a FREMM multipurpose frigate of the Egyptian Navy. Al-Galala was originally constructed as the Carlo Bergamini-class Spartaco Schergat before being acquired by Egypt and being renamed.

== Development and design ==
Three original variants of the FREMM were proposed; an anti-submarine variant (ASW) and a general-purpose variant (GP) and a land-attack variant (AVT) to replace the existing classes of frigates within the French and Italian navies. A total of 27 FREMM were to be constructed - 17 for France and 10 for Italy - with additional aims to seek exports, however budget cuts and changing requirements has seen this number drop significantly for France, while the order for Italy remained unchanged. The land-attack variant (AVT) was subsequently cancelled.

In 2020 and 2021 it was reported that Italy would sell all its FREMM-class frigates in the current production line (Spartaco Schergat and Emilio Bianchi) to Egypt. Spartaco Schergat was in the final stage of her sea trials while Emilio Bianchi would follow within one year. The deal reportedly also involved other military equipment and was worth 1.2 billion Euros.

Some sensitive equipment was deleted from the original Italian design, including the EW suite's jammers, NETTUNO-4100 RECM system and Thales Altesse CESM equipment. SATCOM antennas were also removed from the communication suite.

== Construction and career ==
On 26 January 2019, the launching ceremony of the ship took place at the Fincantieri plants in Riva Trigoso. On December 31, Al-Galala arrived at Alexandria's naval base after Italy finished training the Egyptian crew on operating the ship, and it was ready for service. Al-Galala can provide protection to Egyptian economic sites like Zohr Field, and other fields in the Mediterranean or the red sea. It's also capable for anti submarine warfare, and anti ship warfare. It was reported that Italy would then order two additional FREMM frigates to replace those transferred to Egypt with the anticipated delivery of the replacements by 2024.
