= ENS Tahya Misr =

FREMM class multi-purpose frigates in the Egyptian Navy

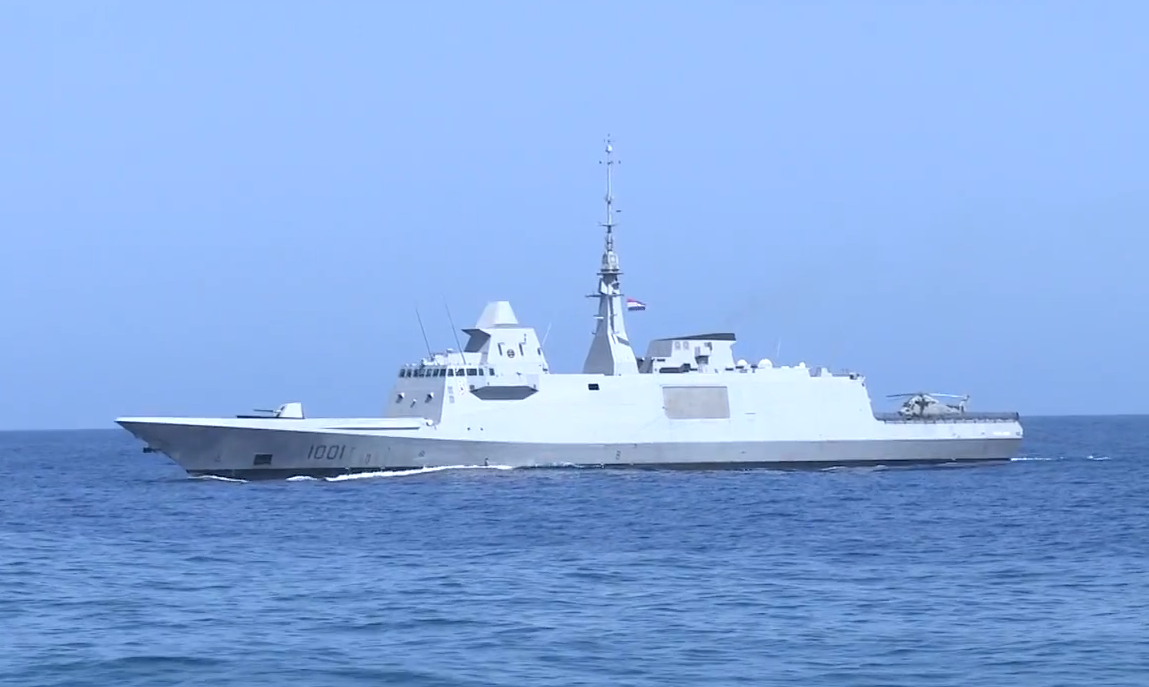
- Tahya Misr underway on 10 March 2016

History

Egypt
- Name: Tahya Misr; (تحيا مصر)
- Namesake: Tahya Misr; (Long live Egypt)
- Ordered: 16 February 2015
- Builder: DCNS, Lorient
- Laid down: 8 October 2008
- Launched: 18 October 2012
- Commissioned: 17 March 2016
- Renamed: From Normandie
- Home port: Alexandria
- Identification: MMSI number: 622121039; Callsign: SSMQ; Hull number: FFG 1001
- Status: Active

General characteristics
- Class & type: Aquitaine-class frigate
- Displacement: 6,000 tons
- Length: 466 ft (142.0 m)
- Beam: 65 ft (19.8 m)
- Draught: 16 ft (4.9 m)
- Propulsion: MTU Series 4000 (2,2 MW everyone); CODLOG
- Speed: 27 knots (50 km/h; 31 mph); max cruise speed 15.6 knots (28.9 km/h; 18.0 mph)
- Range: 6,000 nmi (11,000 km; 6,900 mi) at 15 knots (28 km/h; 17 mph)
- Complement: 145
- Sensors & processing systems: Héraklès multi-purpose passive electronically scanned array radar
- Armament: 16-cell MBDA SYLVER A43 VLS for 16 MBDA Aster 15 missiles; 1 × Leonardo OTO Melara 76 mm SR gun; 3 × Nexter 20 mm Narwhal remote weapon systems; 8 × MBDA MM40 Exocet block 3 anti-ship missiles; 2 x double Leonardo (WASS) B-515 launcher for MU 90 torpedoes
- Aircraft carried: 1 × NH90 helicopter
- Aviation facilities: Single hangar

ENS Tahya Misr (FFG 1001) is a FREMM multipurpose frigate of the Egyptian Navy. Tahya Misr was originally constructed as the Aquitaine-class Normandie before being acquired by Egypt and being renamed.

== Development and design ==
Three original variants of the FREMM were proposed; an anti-submarine variant (ASW) and a general-purpose variant (GP) and a land-attack variant (AVT) to replace the existing classes of frigates within the French and Italian navies. A total of 27 FREMM were to be constructed - 17 for France and 10 for Italy - with additional aims to seek exports, however budget cuts and changing requirements has seen this number drop significantly for France, while the order for Italy remained unchanged. The land-attack variant (AVT) was subsequently cancelled.

On 16 February 2015, the Egyptian Navy ordered one FREMM vessel to enter service before the opening of the New Suez Canal, as part of a larger deal (including 24 Rafales and a supply of missiles) worth US$5.9 billion (€5.2 billion). The SYLVER A70 VLS and NETTUNO-4100 jamming equipment were removed due to export limitations for such sensitive equipment. The crew will be around 126 sailors compared to 108 in the French Navy. The SATCOM antenna for the French Syracuse satellites was also taken down; however, Egypt will use its own military telecommunications satellite, supplied by Airbus Defence and Space and Thales Alenia Space, in conjunction with its naval vessels. From March 2015, DCNS trained the Egyptian crew in the technology of the ship and DCNS and its partners accompanied the crew for a period of 15 months.

== Construction and career ==
In order to keep to Egypt's deadlines, France offered to send Normandie, originally intended for the French Navy. On 23 June 2015, French naval shipbuilder DCNS transferred the FREMM frigate Tahya Misr ( ex-Normandie) to the Egyptian Navy. A ceremony took place to transfer Normandie, renamed Tahya Misr ("Long Live Egypt") to Egypt, in the presence of General Sedki Sobhy, the Egyptian Minister of Defense, Jean-Yves Le Drian, the French Minister of Defense, Admiral Osama Rabie, Egyptian Navy Commander in Chief, Admiral Bernard Rogel, the French Chief of Navy and Hervé Guillou, Chairman & CEO of DCNS. The frigate sailed for the first time under the Egyptian flag on 24 June 2015, and as the flagship of the fleet on 6 August, it participated in the inauguration of the new Suez Canal.

In August 2018, Tahya Misr carried out a joint exercise with the similar Italian frigate Carlo Margottini, returning home after having participated in Operation Atalanta in the Indian Ocean.

== Gallery ==
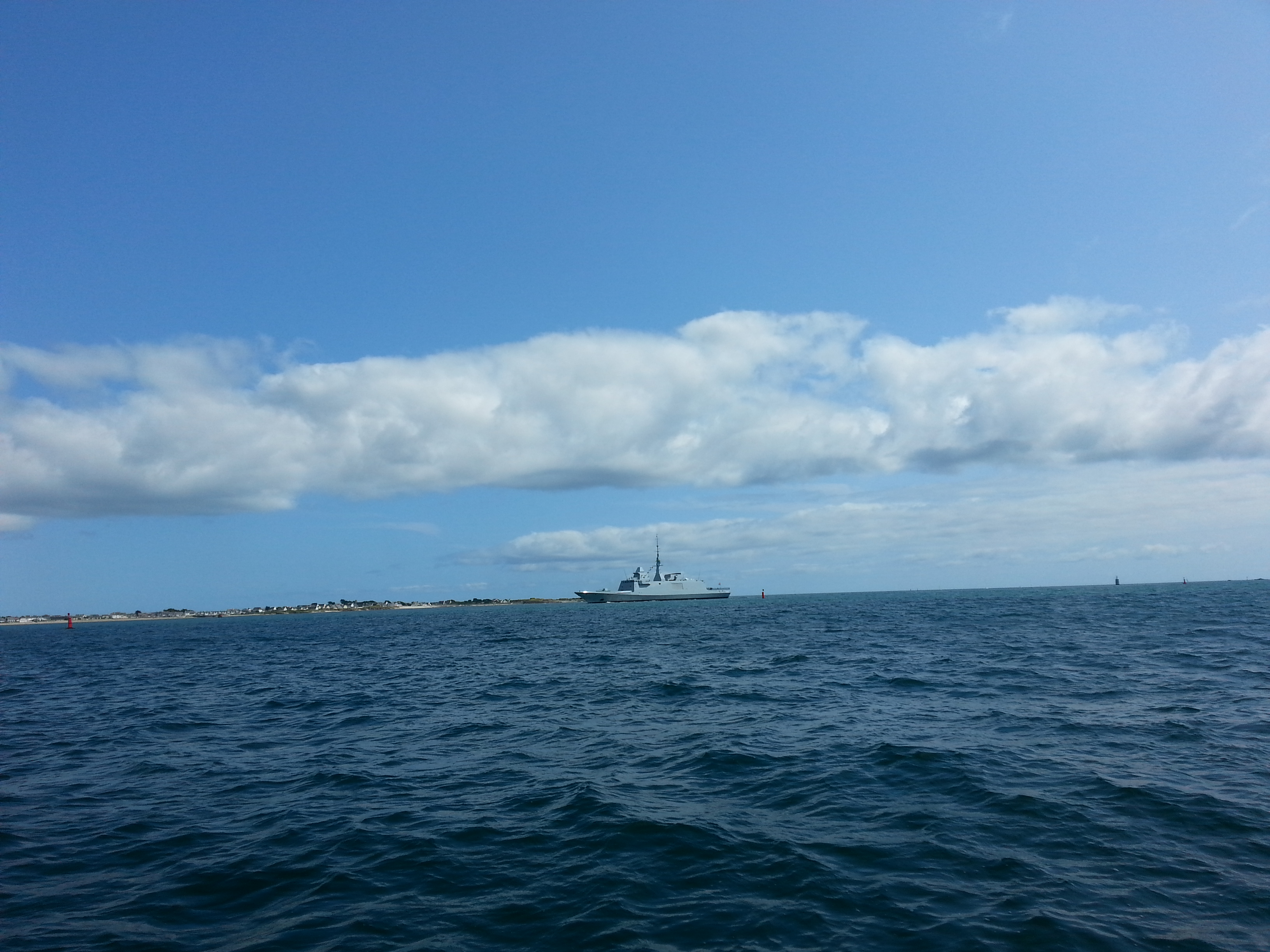
Tahya Misr before her transfer as Normandie at Lorient on 2 July 2015.

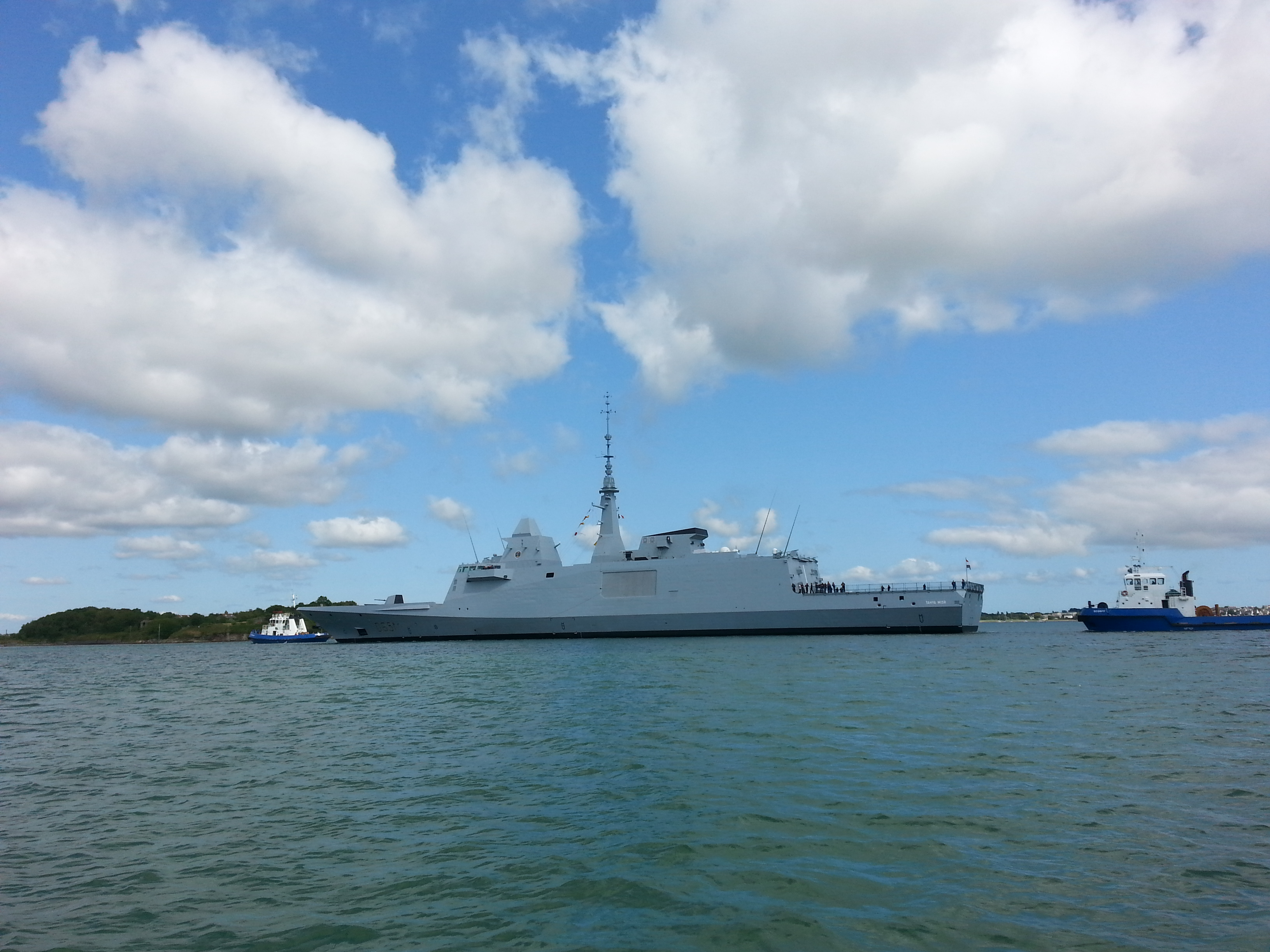
Tahya Misr before her transfer as Normandie at Lorient on 2 July 2015.

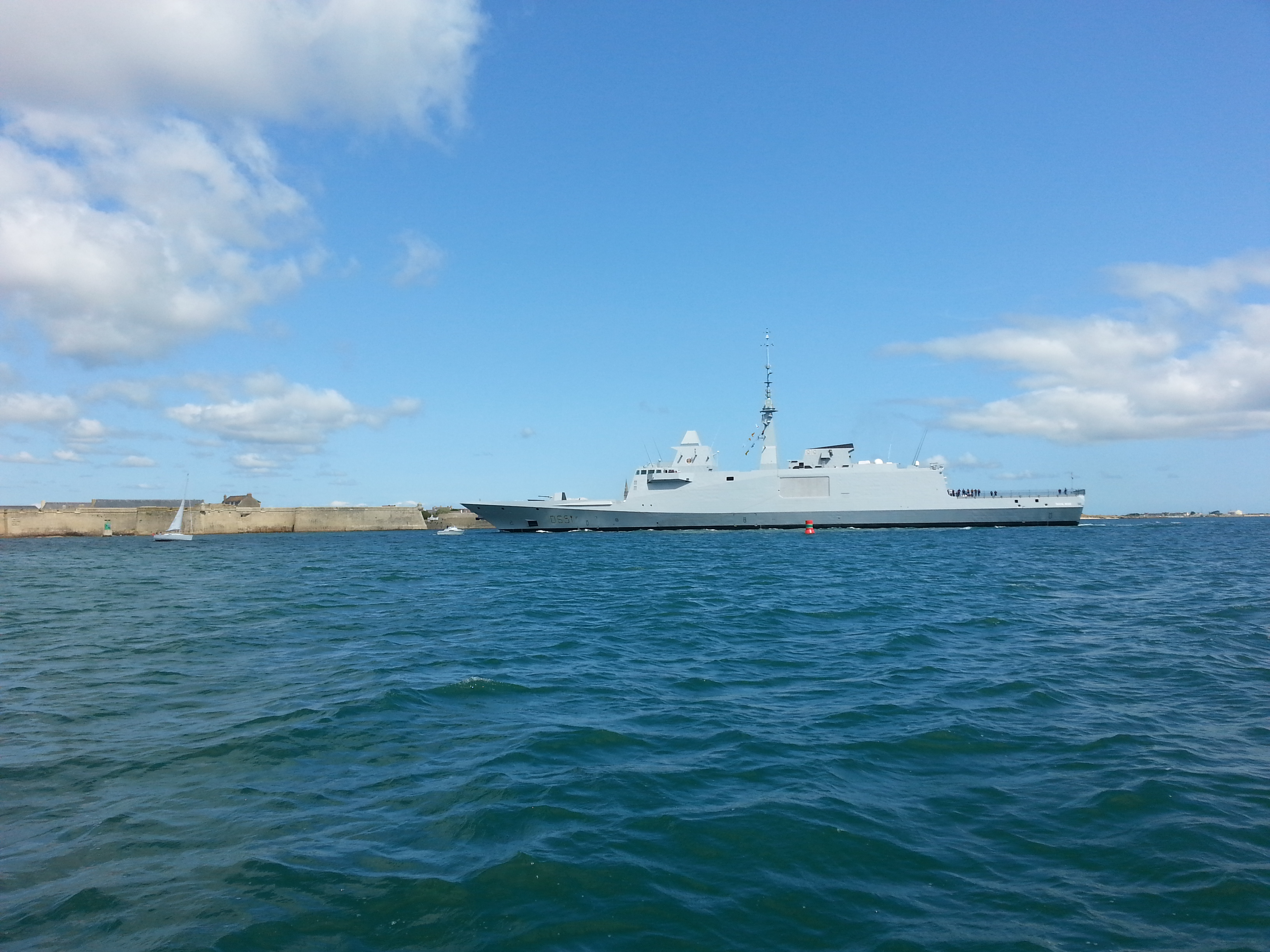
Tahya Misr before her transfer as Normandie at Lorient on 2 July 2015.

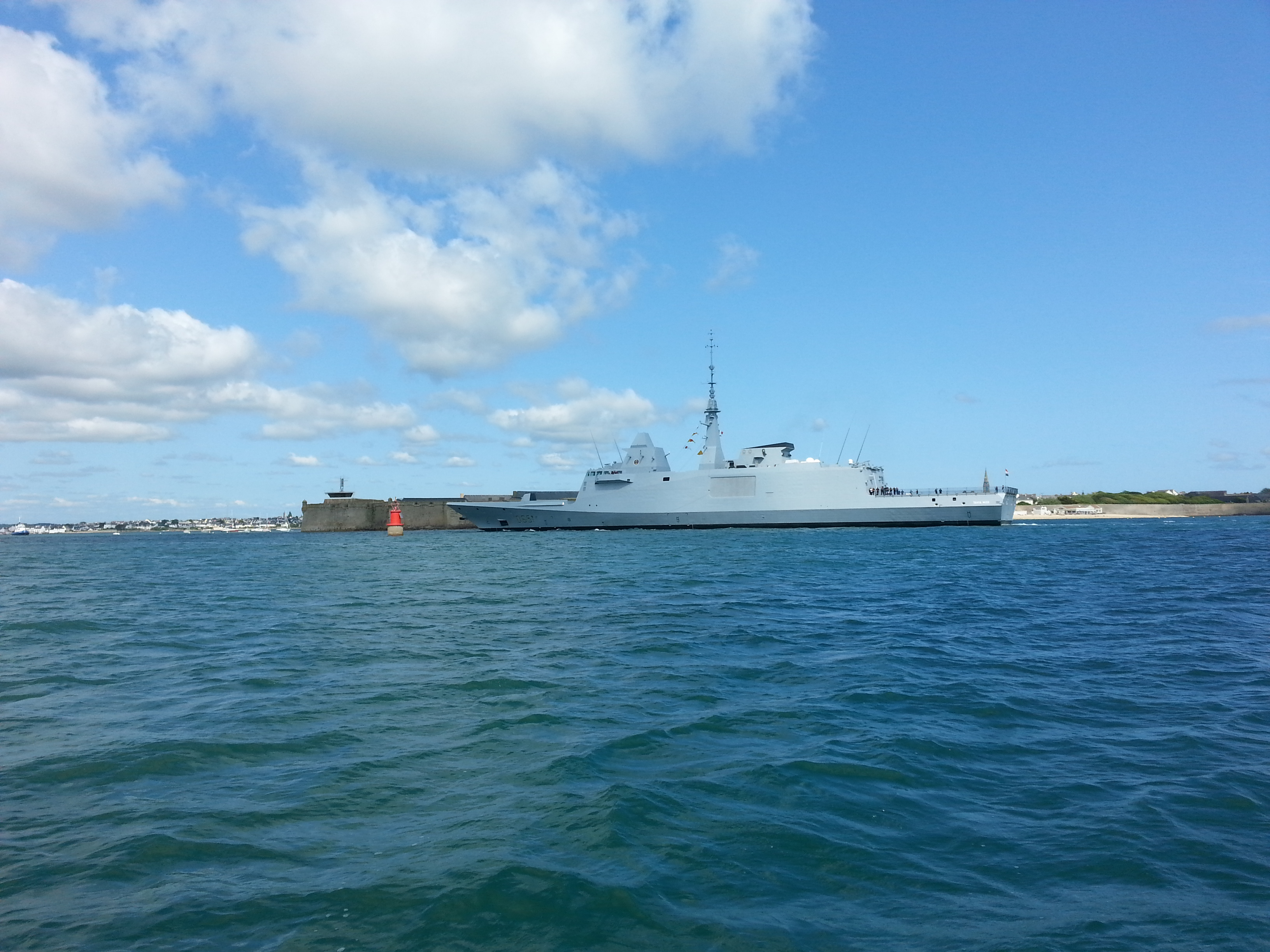
Tahya Misr before her transfer as Normandie at Lorient on 2 July 2015.
