= Herakles (radar) =

Multi-function radar

Héraklès
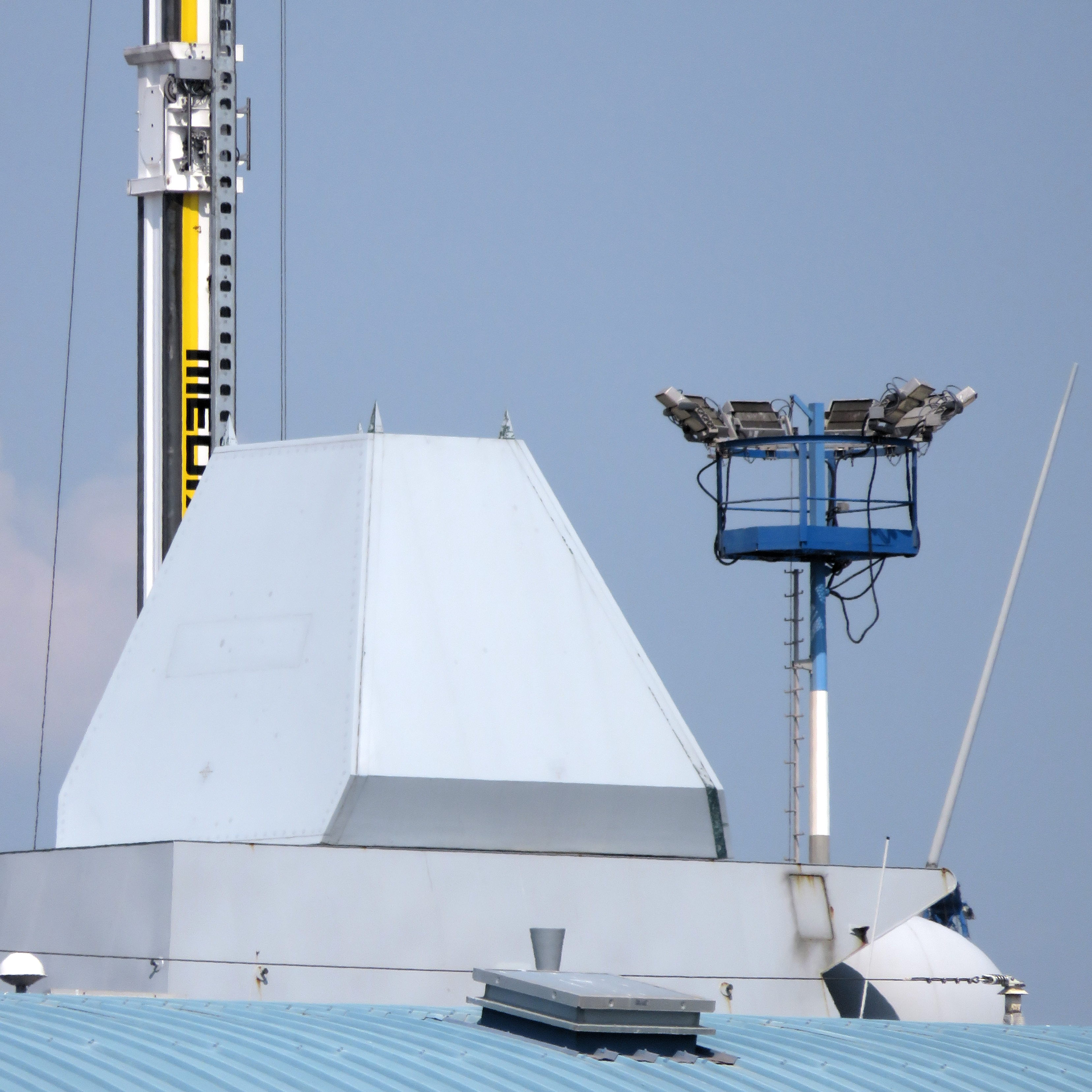
- Héraklès radar of a FREMM
- Country of origin: France
- Introduced: 2005
- Type: 3D Air search
- Frequency: E/F band (S band)
- Range: 250 km or 300 km (air); 80 km (surface)
- Azimuth: 0–360°
- Elevation: 0-70°

Herakles is a passive electronically scanned array multi-function radar manufactured by Thales Group. It is installed on board the FREMM multipurpose frigates and the Formidable-class frigates of the Republic of Singapore Navy.

It has a track capacity of 400 air and surface targets and is able to achieve automatic target detection, confirmation and track initiation in a single scan, while simultaneously providing mid-course guidance updates to the MBDA Aster missiles launched from the ship.

Herakles radars in operation
The French FREMM frigate Alsace exiting Port-Louis harbour. The Herakles antenna is the rotating pyramid on top of the superstructure above the bridge

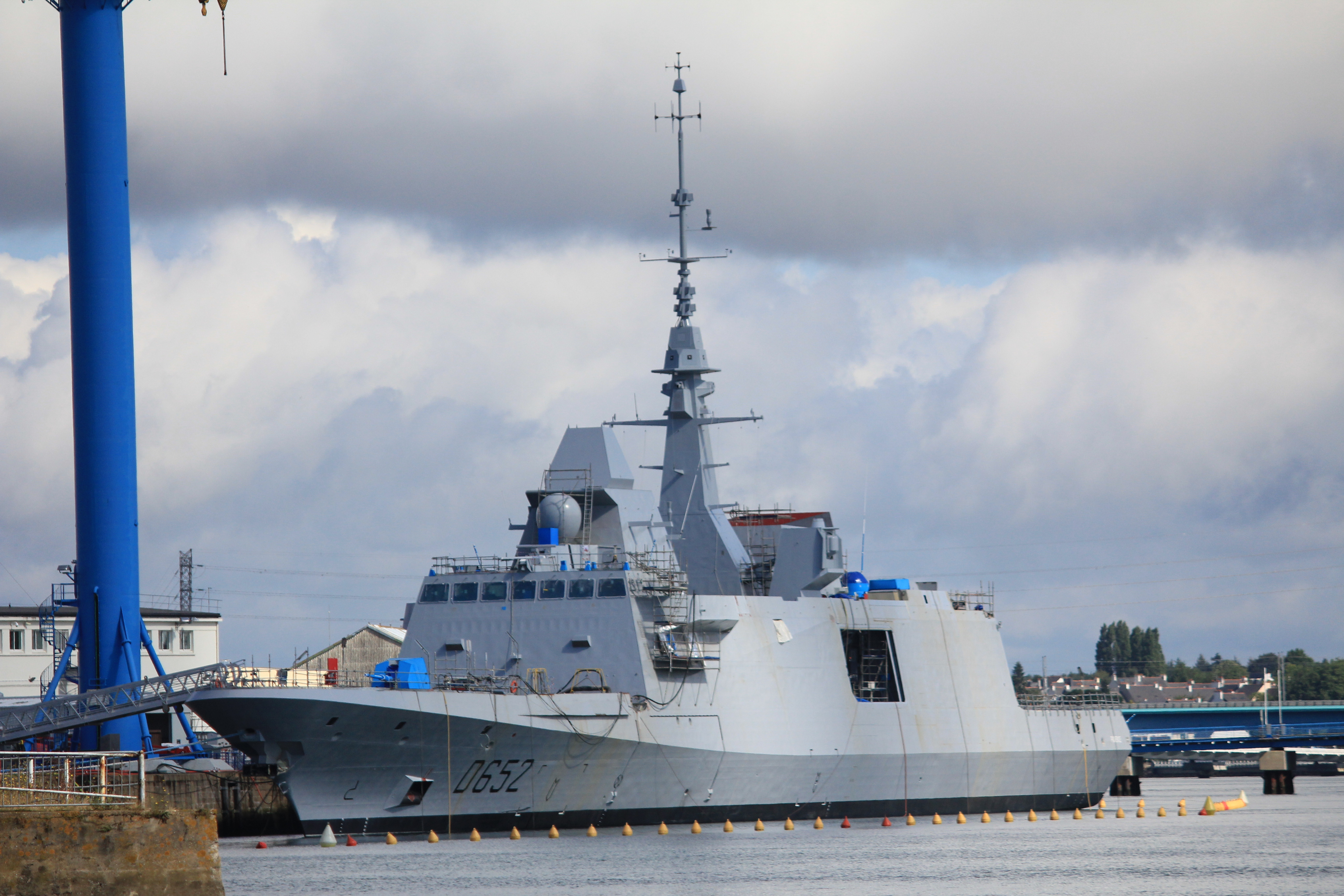
The French FREMM frigate Provence in Lorient harbour, with Héraklès radar visible above the bridge

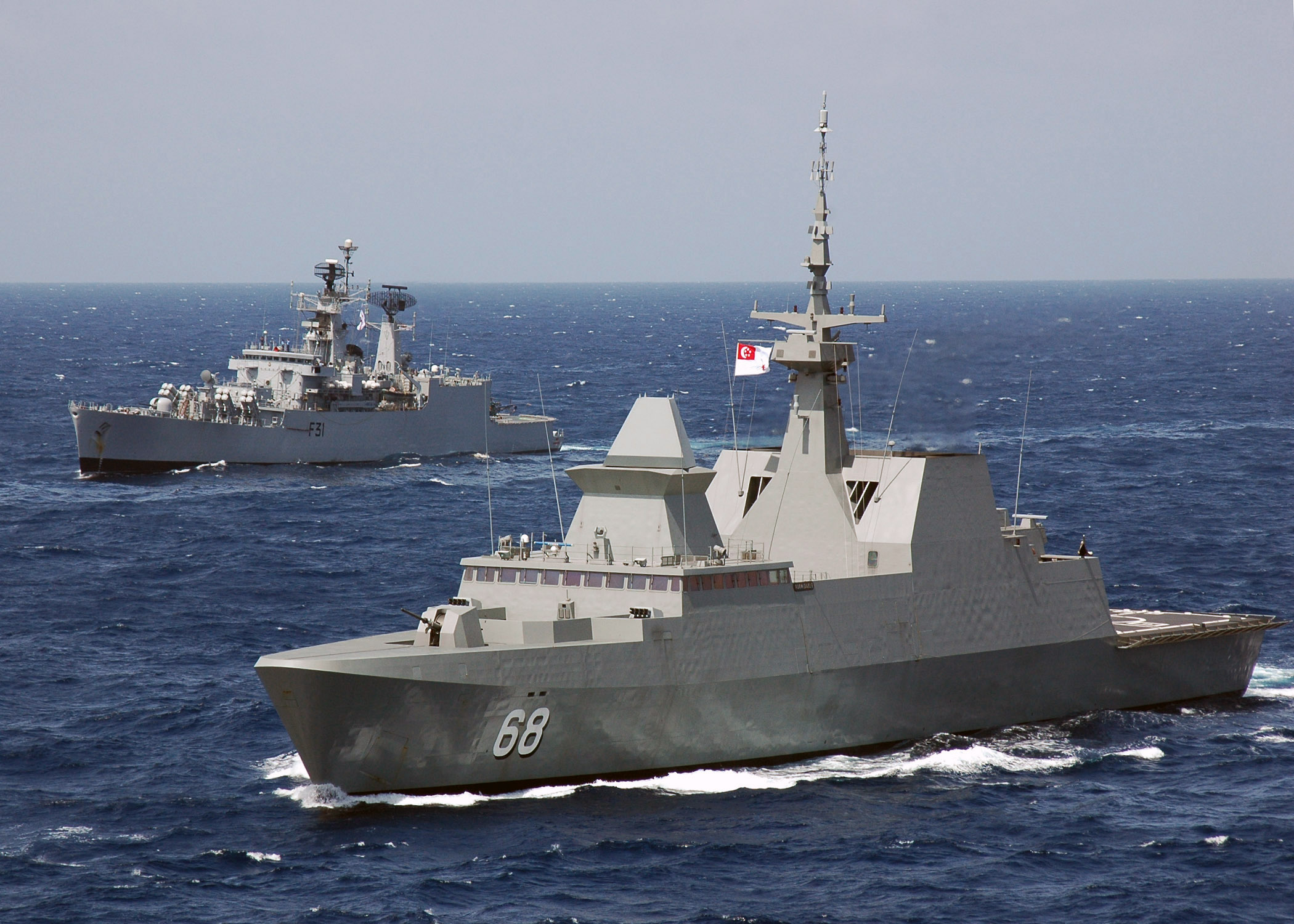
The Republic of Singapore Navy frigate RSS Formidable (68) with Héraklès radar visible above the bridge
