= INS Tabar =

Indian Navy Talwar Class Frigate

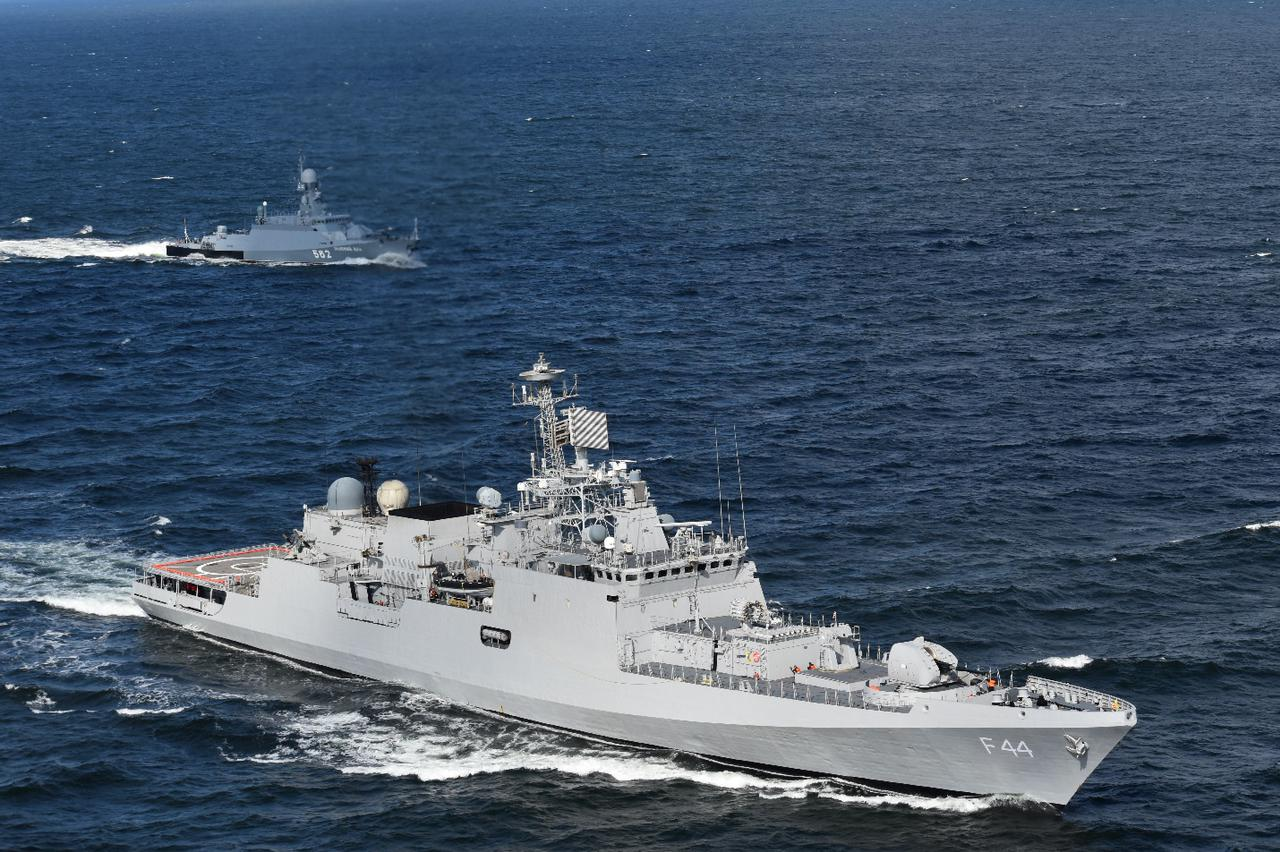
- INS Tabar (F44) with Buyan corvette Zelenyy Dol (562) during INDRANAVY 2021 exercise.

History

India
- Name: INS Tabar
- Namesake: "Battle axe"
- Ordered: 17 November 1997
- Builder: Baltiyskiy Zavod, St. Petersburg
- Laid down: 26 May 2000
- Launched: 25 May 2001
- Commissioned: 19 April 2004
- Motto: "Guts and Glory"
- Status: in active service

General characteristics
- Class & type: Talwar-class frigate
- Displacement: 3,620 long tons (3,678 t) standard; 4,035 long tons (4,100 t) full load
- Length: 124.8 m (409 ft 5 in)
- Beam: 15.2 m (49 ft 10 in)
- Draught: 4.5 m (14 ft 9 in)
- Installed power: 2 × DS-71 cruise turbines (9,000 shp)); 2 × DT-59 boost turbines (19,500 shp)
- Propulsion: COGAG configuration
- Speed: 30 kn (56 km/h; 35 mph)
- Range: 4,850 nmi (8,980 km; 5,580 mi) at 14 kn (26 km/h; 16 mph); 1,600 nmi (3,000 km; 1,800 mi) at 30 kn (56 km/h; 35 mph)
- Complement: 180 (18 officers)
- Sensors & processing systems: 1 × Terma Scanter radar; 1 × MR-212/201-1 navigation radar; 1 × Kelvin Hughes Nucleus-2 6000A radar; 1 × Ladoga-ME-11356 intertial navigation and stabilisation; 1 × Fregat M2EM 3D circular scan radar; 1 × Ratep JSC 5P-10E Puma fire-control system; 1 × 3R14N-11356 fire-control system FCS; 4 × MR-90 Orekh; BEL HUMSA (Hull Mounted Sonar Array)
- Electronic warfare & decoys: 1 × Varuna EWS; 1 × PK-10 ship-borne decoy launching systems; 4 × KT-216 decoy launchers
- Armament: Anti-air missiles: 24 × Shtil-1 medium range missiles; 8 × Igla-1E (SA-16); Anti-ship/Land-attack missiles: 8 × VLS launched Klub, anti-ship cruise missiles; Guns: 1 × 100 mm A-190E, naval gun; 2 × Kashtan CIWS; Anti-submarine warfare: 2 × 2 533 mm torpedo tubes; 1 × RBU-6000 (RPK-8) rocket launcher
- Aircraft carried: 1 × Ka-28 Helix-A, Ka-31 Helix B or HAL Dhruv helicopter

INS Tabar (F44) (lit. 'Battle Axe') is the third of the Talwar-class frigate of the Indian Navy. The frigate was built by Baltiyskiy Zavod in St. Petersburg, Russia. The frigate was commissioned on 19 April 2004 in Kaliningrad, Russia with Captain (later Vice Admiral) Biswajit Dasgupta. As of August 2024, the current Commanding Officer (CO) of INS Tabar is Captain MR Harish.

INS Tabar reached her home-port of Mumbai on 31 July 2004. Along with her sister ships INS Talwar ("sword" in Sanskrit) and INS Trishul ("trident" in Sanskrit), INS Tabar is assigned to Indian Navy's Western Naval Command, head-quartered in Mumbai. INS Tabar is a well-equipped warship that has the ability to handle air/surface/sub-surface missions or defending herself operating either independently on maritime missions or supporting a larger naval task force.

== Design and performance ==
INS Tabar's 28 officers and 232 sailors living conditions are similar to those on the Royal Australian Navy's Adelaide-class frigates. Fully loaded, INS Tabar has a displacement of 4,035 tons. The main engines of INS Tabar are the Zorya/Mashproekt M7N-1E gas turbine plant comprising two DS-71 cruise turbines (each rated up to 9,000 hp) and two DT-59 boost turbines. These power-plants move INS Tabar to 30 knots (56 km/h; 35 mph). Her maximum range is 4,850 nautical miles (8,980 km; 5,580 mi) at 14 knots (26 km/h; 16 mph), while at 30 knots (56 km/h; 35 mph) the range lessens to 1,600 nautical miles (3,000 km; 1,800 mi). One downside for INS Tabar and her sister ships is the amount of smoke her engines produce.

== Equipment ==
=== Armament ===
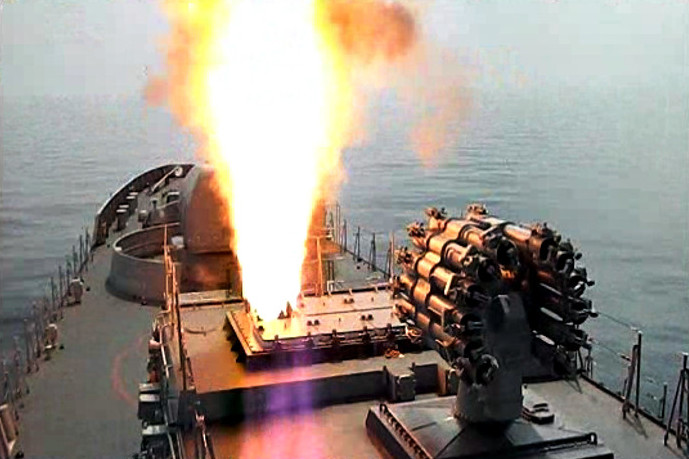
INS Tabar firing the Klub missile.

The surface-to-air weapons systems include one single-rail MS-196 launcher that can launch the long range Shtil-1 (NATO: SA-17) surface-to-air missile. Eight Igla-1E (NATO: SA-16) portable air defence missiles are on board for short-range threats. INS Tabar became the third Indian warship to incorporate an eight cell KBSM 3S-14NE Vertical Launcher and was the first to upload the new Indian/Russian designed missile, the supersonic BrahMos PJ-10 ASCM (anti-sub/ship/surface cruise missile). INS Tabar's VLS can launch the Indian designed 3M-54E Klub-N (NATO: SS-N-27) subsonic ASCM. INS Tabar has one 100 mm (4 in) A-190 (E) Dual Purpose Gun mount for surface and air targets. Its rate of fire is 60 rounds a minute at a range of 15 km (9.3 mi).

Two Kashtan Air Defence Gun/Missile mounts are INS Tabar's Close-In Weapons System (CIWS). The Kashtan CIWS has two GSh-30k 30 mm (1.2 in) Gatling guns per mount firing 5,000 rounds a minute, along with eight 9M-311 Grison missiles (NATO: SA-N-11) with a range of 8 km (5.0 mi). There are 64 Grison reloads (32 each mount) with a package of four missile taking less than two minutes to load. Forward of INS Tabar's bridge and aft of the VLS is one 12-round RBU-6000 anti-submarine warfare rocket launch that can fire either Splav-90R rockets or RGB-60 depth charges. Two pairs of fixed 533 mm (21 in) DTA-53 torpedo tubes are located port and starboard midships. Both can launch either SET-65E anti-sub and 53-65KE anti-ship torpedoes.

=== Sensors ===
Controlling this array of weapons is the Trebovaniye-M combat information and control system that can control all of INS Tabar's weapons as well as using situation analysis to generate combat missions. The combat system can transmit data and process information from up to 250 sources. With a range of nearly 300 km (190 mi), the Fregat M2EM (NATO: Top Plate) 3D radar is INS Tabar's air/surface radar. The M2EM system features continuous scanned arrays along with providing targeting information for the Shtil-1 missile system. One 3Ts-25E Garpun-B radar unit is utilised for long-range surface search and target acquisition. Garupun-B radar was replaced with a Terma Scantar radar. INS Tabar is also equipped with two navigation radars. INS Tabar's fire control is the Ratep JSC 5P-10E Puma fire control system. The Puma uses phased array and target tracking radar along with laser and TV devices. The Puma can operate autonomously with the ability of automatically detecting, locking on, and tracking four targets at once.

INS Tabar's sonar is the BEL APSOH (Advanced Panoramic Sonar Hull) hull-mounted sonar. The APSOH sonar has active ranging, passive listening, and auto tracking of targets. For countermeasures INS Tabar includes 120 mm (4.7 in) chaff and infra-red decoy rounds fired by four KT-216 launchers. This ship was originally equipped with the Russian TK-25E-5 electronic warfare suite and was later replaced by the BEL manufactured Varuna ESM/Electronic warfare suite with its distinctive circular housing located above the Fregat radar.

=== Aircraft carried ===
For her deployment INS Tabar had a Ka-31 Helix-B AEW helicopter embarked from Indian Naval Air Squadron 339 'Falcons' Squadron in Mumbai. With a flight crew of two, the Ka-31 has a speed of 143 knots (265 km/h) and a maximum ceiling of 6,000 metres. Its range is a maximum of 540 nautical miles (1,000 km) and can remain airborne for 4.5 hours. The Ka-31's airborne early warning radar is the E-801M Oko (Eye), a 6 by 1 metre (19.7 ft × 3.3 ft) planar array located beneath the fuselage. The radar unfolds during flight and has the ability to detect up to 200 targets while simultaneously track up to 20 airborne or surface threats from a range of 115 km (71 mi) from an altitude of nearly 10,000 ft (3,000 m) Information gathered can be transmitted via an encoded data-link to a ship or shore command post. INS Tabar has also possibility to carry one Ka-28 or one Indian-made HAL Dhruv.

== Service history ==
=== Operations near the Horn of Africa ===
Following the media attention to the MT Stolt Valor incident, and a host of other pirate attacks on Indian vessels, as well as the general lawlessness around the Horn of Africa, the Indian government deployed INS Tabar to the area to conduct anti-piracy surveillance and patrol operations. She arrived to patrol the Gulf of Aden on 2 November 2008.

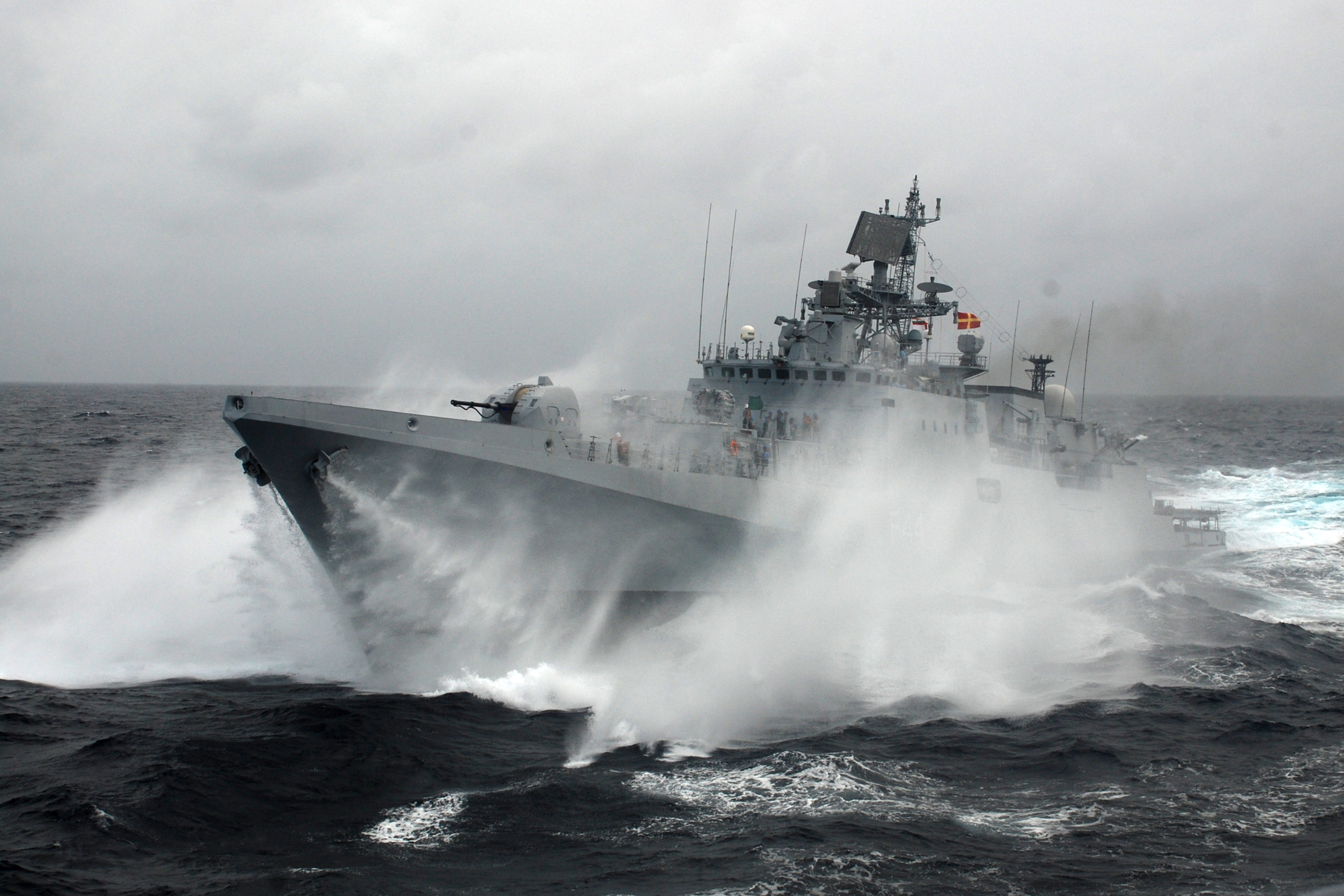
INS Tabar in action

On 11 November 2008, INS Tabar was called into action to fight off a pirate attack on an Indian ship, the 38,265-tonne bulk carrier owned by the Mumbai-based Great Eastern Shipping Company Jag Arnav, and a Saudi-registered vessel, MV Timaha. Both ships had crossed the Suez Canal when they were attacked by pirates who surrounded the vessel in small boats. An Indian navy spokesman said there were no casualties in the operation. "Both the ships had crossed the Suez Canal and were a short distance away from Aden when the Saudi vessel was attacked by these boats, each carrying up to five pirates each. Our frigate patrolling the area responded to a distress call by "MV Timaha" and sent an attack helicopter carrying commandos which opened fire while the pirates were making repeated attempts to board the Saudi ship. While all this was on, the Indian cargo ship was attacked within the next 30 minutes." As Jag Arnav was about 25 nmi (46 km) away it gave a distress call. A Chetak helicopter, carrying a team of MARCOS (Indian Navy Marine Commandos) personnel, was sent to the location of MV Jag Arnav. After the ensuing battle, the team successfully thwarted the hijack attempt. The incident took place 60 nmi (110 km) from the coast of Somalia. From 2 to 19 November, Indian naval operations in the area, led by INS Tabar, successfully escorted approximately 35 ships, including many non-Indian flagged vessels, safely during their transit through these pirate-infested waters. She sank the hijacked fishing vessel FV Ekawat Nava 5 after being fired upon by pirates.

On 20 November, an anonymous Indian Navy official announced that Tabar will be replaced in the Gulf of Aden by the destroyer INS Mysore, which at 6,700 tonnes is a larger ship with a greater holding capacity.

==== International reactions ====
The head of the International Maritime Bureau's piracy reporting centre in Kuala Lumpur, Noel Choong, said "If all warships do this, it will be a strong deterrent. But if it's just a rare case, then it won't work. It's about time that such a forceful action is taken. It's an action that everybody is waiting for. The United Nations and international community must decide how to solve this grave problem (of piracy). They must be more forceful in their action...[action should have been taken] years back or even last year when piracy was just starting–it's clearly getting worse and out of control."

The United Nations Secretary-General Ban Ki-moon also welcomed a decision by India and other countries to cooperate with Somalia in the fight against piracy in its waters. In a report on Somalia submitted to the Security Council, Ban said "I welcome the decision of the governments of India and the Russian Federation to cooperate with the Transitional Federal Government of Somalia to fight piracy and armed robbery against ships."

==== Attack and sinking of Ekawat Nava ====
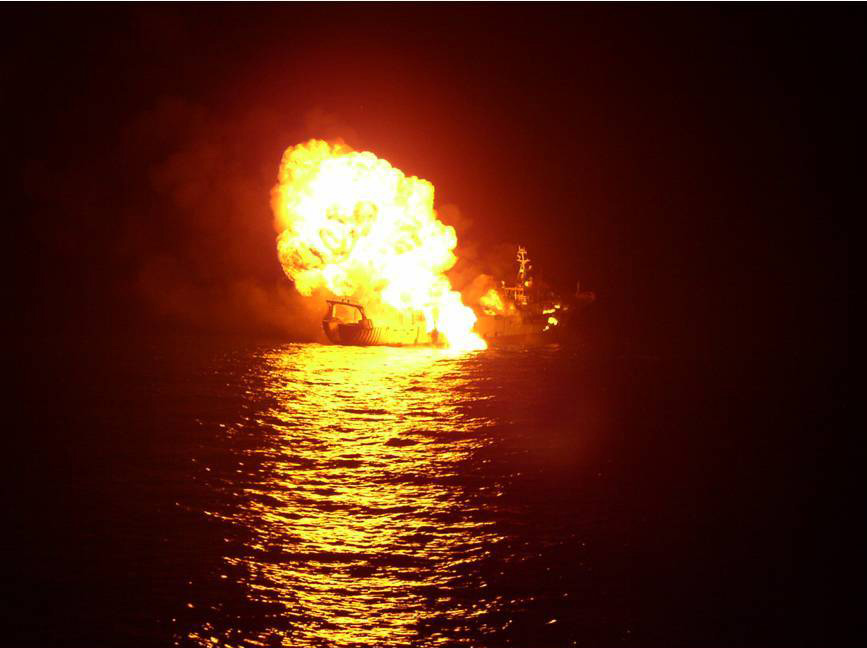
Anti-piracy operations by INS Tabar in the Gulf of Aden on 18 November 2008

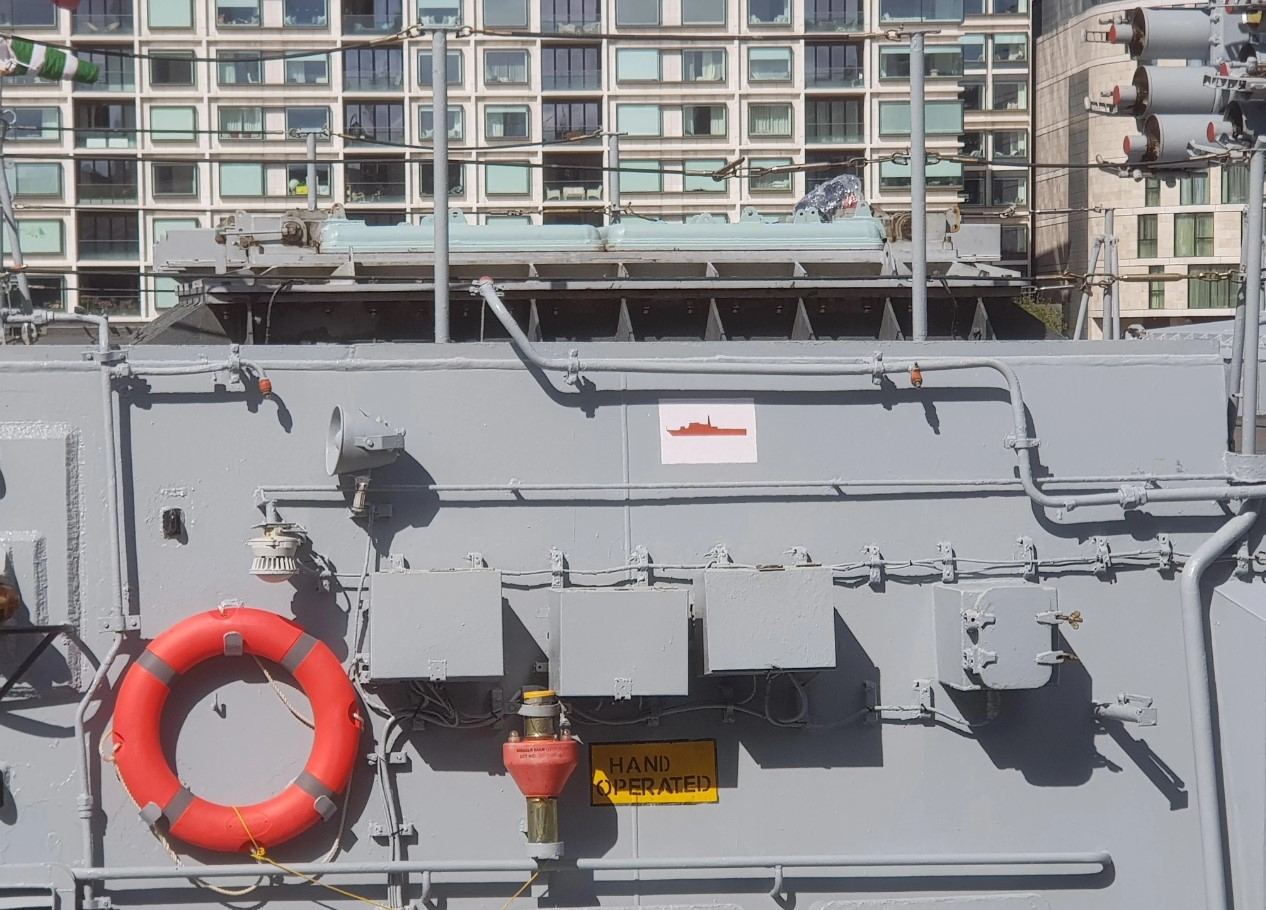
The kill marking representing FV Ekawat Nava 5 by Tabar's VLS.

Just over a week after the MV Jav Arnav incident, on 19 November 2008, the Indian Navy reported that INS Tabar had come under attack from pirates. The crew of INS Tabar requested that the pirate vessel stop to allow a search, but the pirates responded with a threat to sink Tabar if it came any closer. The pirates then opened fire on Tabar before the Indian navy responded by returning fire. After the retaliatory strike, it was reported that a large explosion occurred on the pirate vessel, rumoured to have been caused by the pirates' weapons cache. The attack continued for about three to four more hours, and resulted in the sinking of the pirate's "mother-ship". INS Tabar also forced the abandonment of another pirate vessel, while several pirates managed to escape via a speedboat under the cover of darkness. Recalling the incident to media persons, an Indian naval spokesman, Commander Nirad Sinha, said that "INS Tabar encountered a pirate vessel south west of Oman with two speedboats in tow. This vessel was similar in description to the 'mother vessel' mentioned in various piracy bulletins. INS Tabar closed in on the vessel and asked her to stop for investigation. Pirates were seen roaming on the upper deck of the vessel with guns and rocket-propelled grenade launchers. The vessel continued threatening calls and subsequently fired upon INS Tabar."

Reports later surfaced that the sunken "mother-ship" was originally a Thai fishing trawler FV Ekawat Nava 5, captured by the pirates which still had the Thai crew captive on board. One sailor was reportedly still alive, another confirmed dead, and 14 sailors remained missing. The surviving member of the trawler's crew was picked up by a passing ship after six days adrift on the ocean and was taken to Yemen where he informed the owner of the trawler of the events. The survivor said all the crew were tied up under the deck, except the captain and translator.

=== 2016 ===
In 2016, the ship has visited various ports of the Persian Gulf on a goodwill mission and the visit was highly successful. The ship also participated in the International Fleet Review at Visakhapatnam. It also visited Port Louis to participate in the Mauritius National Day celebrations.

=== 2021 Exercises ===
- INS Tabar participated in multiple Combined Maritime Bilateral Exercises like Exercise Varuna with French Navy, Exercise INDRA with Russian Federation Navy and Passage Exercises (PASSEX) across the Gulf of Aden, Red Sea, Suez Canal, Mediterranean Sea, North Sea and Baltic Sea while making port calls at Djibouti, Egypt, Italy, France, UK, Russia, Netherlands, Morocco, and Arctic Council countries like Sweden and Norway.
- INS Tabar on 27 June 2021 arrived in Egypt, in Alexandria. Captain Mahesh paid tributes at unknown soldiers memorial and participated in a two-day exercise with the Egyptian Navy Ship Toushka commenced by helo deck landing ops and underway replenishment drills.
- The INS Tabar participated in the maritime exercises with Italian frigate ITS Antonio Marceglia (F 597) on 4–5 July 2021 in the Tyrrhenian Sea. This exercise was covered by air defence, replenishment at sea, communication drills and cross deck helicopter operations during the day and night.
- On 15–16 July 2021, INS Tabar undertook maritime exercises with French navy's FNS Aquitaine in Bay of Biscay. Other than FNS Aquitaine, four Rafale and one NH90 helicopter also participated in the exercise. This exercise included the wide range of operations like anti-submarine, surface manoeuvres, underway replenishment, firing on target, visit board search & seizure (VBSS), Steam Past, Air Defence, Air Picture Compilation, Vertical Replenishment and crossdeck operations were exercised by the ships.
- INS Tabar participated in Russian Navy Day parade from 22 to 27 July in St. Petersburg. D B Venkatesh Varma, Indian ambassador to Russia visited the ship on 23 July and later on Vice-Admiral Sergei Yeliseyev visited the ship and was given Guard of honour by the ship's crew. The commanding officer presented the ship's crest at the end of the Vice-Admiral Sergei Yeliseyev's visit. On 24 July, the commanding officer visited to Piskaryovskoye Memorial Cemetery to pay homage. On on 25 July, the has participated in fleet review along with the 50 ship. On the last day of her visit, she was involved in Exercise INDRA along with the two ships of Russian Navy on 28–29 July in Baltic Sea. The Exercise aims to achieve better military relations, interoperability and long-range sustenance. The ship visited Sweden on 30 July. The Indian Ambassador visited the ship on 31 July.

=== 2024 ===
On 27 June 2024, INS Tabar visited the Alexandria Port, Egypt. The goodwill visit lasted till 30 June. The ships is commanded by Captain MR Harish. The ship will participate in Passage Exercise (PASSEX) with the Egyptian Navy.

On 8 July 2024, INS Tabar visited the Casablanca, Morocco. The goodwill visit lasted till 10 July. The ship participated in Passage Exercise (PASSEX) with the Royal Moroccan Navy.

On 18 July 2024, INS Tabar reached Hamburg, Germany for a 3-day visit. The ship has participated in Maritime Partnership Exercise with the German Navy.

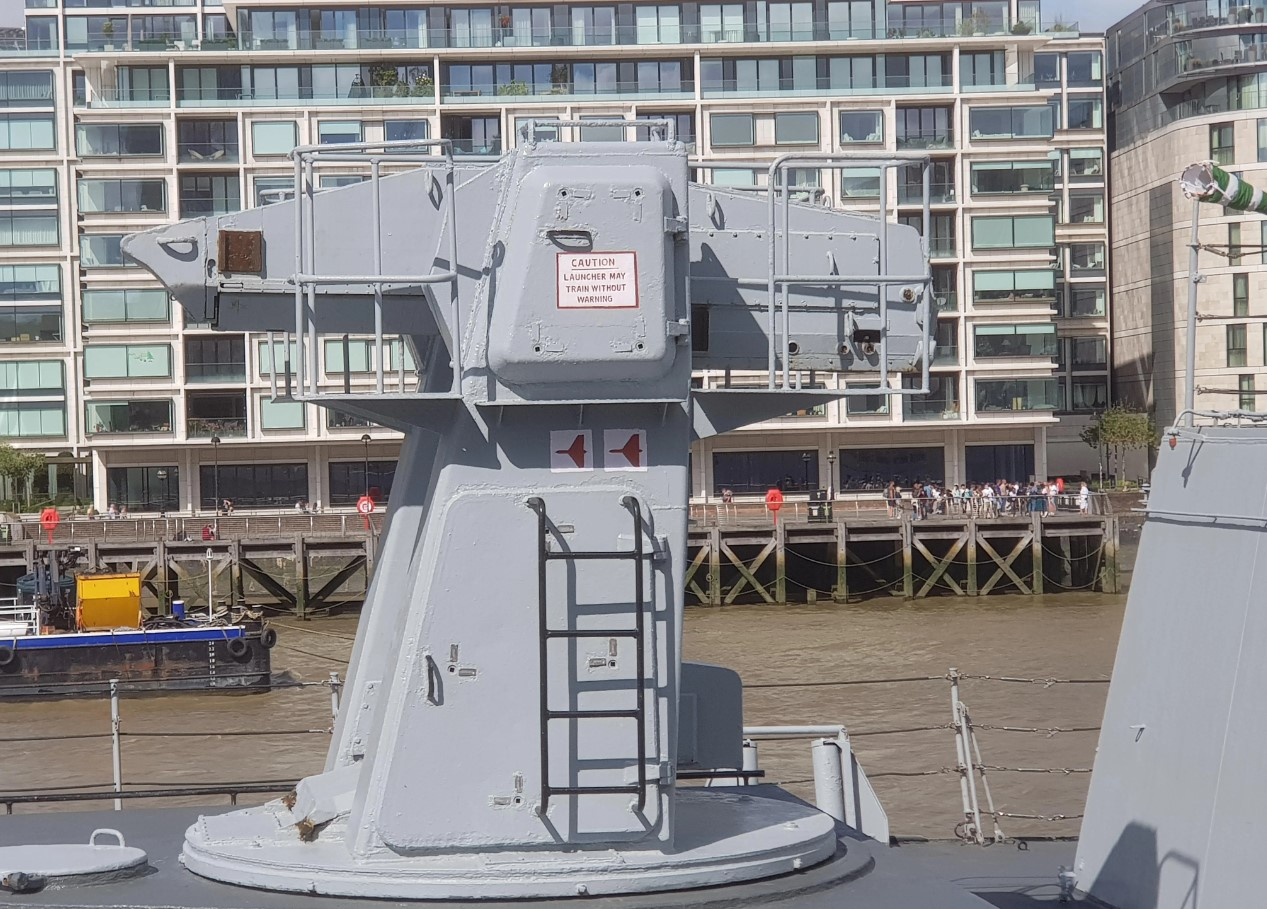
The kill markings on Tabar's Shtil-1 launcher.

On 25 July 2024, INS Tabar reached Saint Petersburg, Russia to participate in Russian Navy Day celebrations on scheduled on 28 July on the Neva River. During the Navy Day celebrations, the Russian President, Vladimir Putin greeted the Indian Navy personnel aboard the vessel. The ship was docked in English Embankment. Upon arrival in Russia images revealed by OSINT sources show two kill marks on Shtil-1 launcher. This was analysed to be Houthi drones which were shot down by the ships. However, this information has not been announced by official sources yet. On 30 July 2024, while returning, the ship has participated in Maritime Partnership Exercise with the Russian Navy's Soobrazitelny. As per the press release, "The MPX involved communication drills, Search & Rescue tactics and Replenishment at Sea serials".

INS Tabar conducted Maritime Partnership Exercise with a German Navy Sea Lynx helicopter of 3rd Squadron Naval Air Wing 5 (MFG5) off Kiel Canal while returning from Russia.

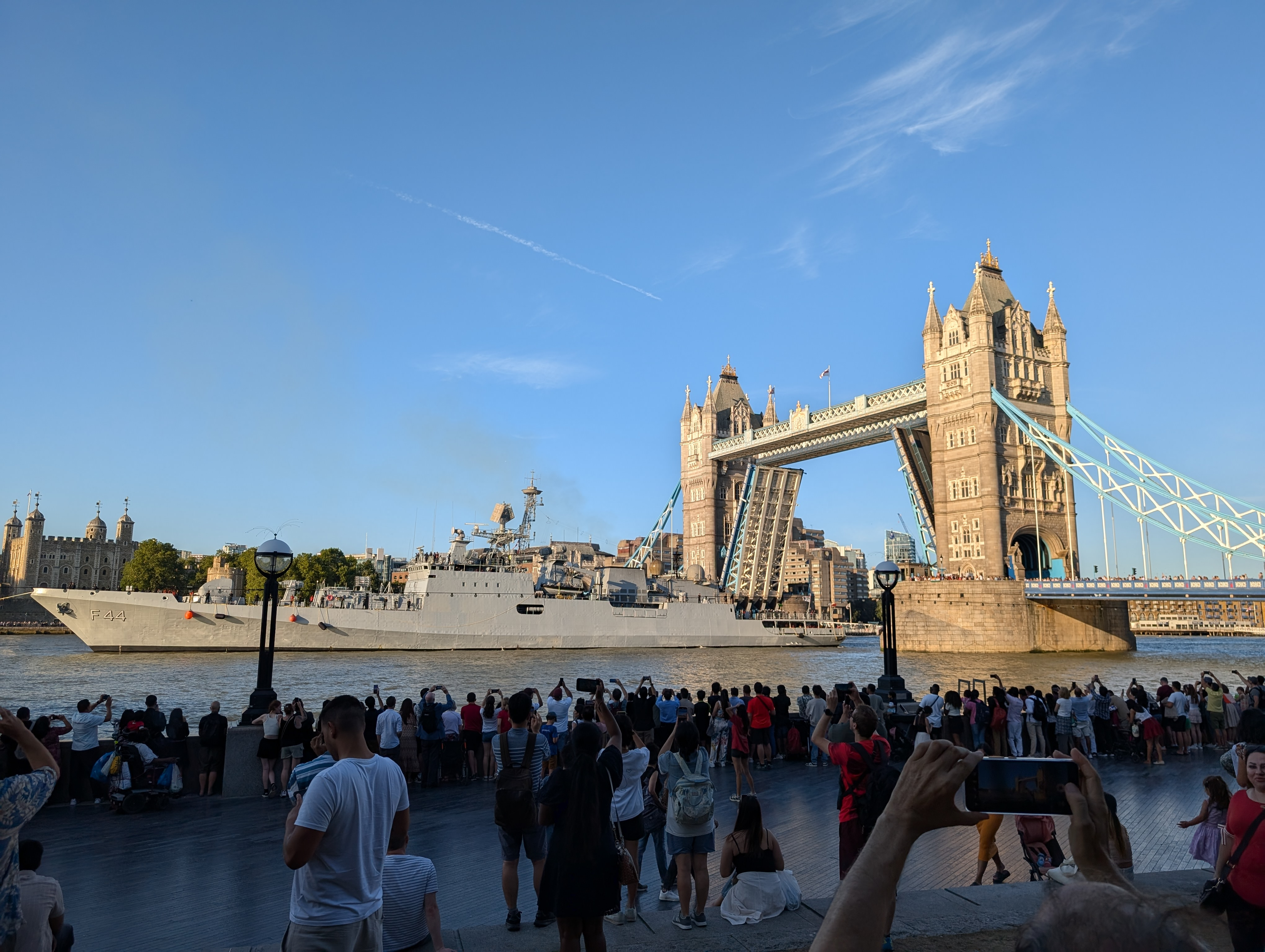
INS Tabar leaving London on the River Thames, Sunday 11th August, underneath the opened Tower Bridge.

On 7 August, INS Tabar reached London, United Kingdom for a four-day visit. The ship was greeted by opening of the Tower Bridge. The ship was docked beside HMS Belfast. It left on Sunday, 11 August shortly before 7 pm.

On 14 August 2024, INS Tabar reached Gothenburg, Sweden for a two-day visit. The ship also participated in the Maritime Partnership Exercise with Swedish Navy Ship HMS Munter, a Tapper-class patrol boat including visual signalling and escort operations.

On 19 August 2024, INS Tabar reached Esbjerg, Denmark for a two-day visit.

On 25 August 2024, INS Tabar reached Málaga, Spain for a two-day visit. The ship also conducted Maritime Partnership Exercise with Spanish Navy Ship Atalaya while departing. The exercise included Station Keeping, Replenishment at Sea Approaches (RASAPs), Flying Exercise (FYEX), Steam Past and PHOTOEX serials.

On 29 August 2024, INS Tabar reached Toulon, France and departed on 1 September 2024. On departure, INS Tabar also participated in Exercise Varuna 2024 in Mediterranean Sea with French Navy alongside Boeing P8I of the Indian Navy. The exercise is scheduled from 2 to 4 September 2024.

=== 2025 ===
On 9 and 10 June, INS Tabar along with a submarine and a Boeing P-8I Neptune maritime patrol aircraft of the Indian Navy conducted a Passage Exercise (PASSEX) with the UK Carrier Strike Group including HMS Prince of Wales (R09) and HMS Richmond (F239). The exercises, held in Northern Arabian Sea, showcased synchronised tactical manoeuvres and unified helicopter control operations highlighting the interoperability of the forces.

On 29 June, a Palau-flagged Oil Products Tanker, MT Yi Cheng 6, sounded a distress call from 80 nmi (150 km; 92 mi) east of Fujairah, UAE after encountering a major fire in the engine room followed by a total power failure. INS Tabar — operationally deployed in the Gulf of Oman for maritime security operations — responded to the call and its fire fighting team and equipment was transferred to the distressed ship though the naval ship's integral boats and helicopter. MT Yi Cheng 6, the crew of which included 14 individuals of Indian origin, was underway from Kandla Port, Gujarat, India to Shinas, Oman. As of the morning 30 June, the intensity of the fire reduced significantly with 13 Indian naval personnel and 5 crew members of the stricken tanker being involved in the firefighting operations.

INS Vikrant (R11) and its Carrier Battle Group (CBG), including Tabar, took part in the biennial Exercise Konkan 2025 with the Royal Navy's UK Carrier Strike Group 2025 (UK CSG 25), a formation centred on HMS Prince of Wales (R09), between 5 and 12 October 2025 off the Western Coast of India. This is the maiden instance of a dual carrier operation between the countries. While the UK CSG included HMS Richmond (F239) and RFA Tidespring (A136) along with HNoMS Roald Amundsen (F311) of the Royal Norwegian Navy and JS Akebono (DD-108) of the Japan Maritime Self-Defense Force, the Indian Navy's CBG included INS Kolkata (D63), INS Mormugao (D67), INS Surat (D69), INS Teg (F45) and INS Deepak (A50). The 2021 edition, named Konkan Shakti, was the largest exercise in the series in which all three services of both countries participated. On 8 October, the Indian Air Force deployed its Su-30MKI and Jaguar aircraft for a one-day exercise with the group.

== See also ==
- Talwar-class frigate - Indian Navy frigate built by Russia.
- Visakhapatnam-class destroyer - Indian Navy future destroyer
- Nilgiri-class frigate (2019) - Indian Navy future frigate
