= Varuna (naval exercise) =

French-Indian joint naval exercise

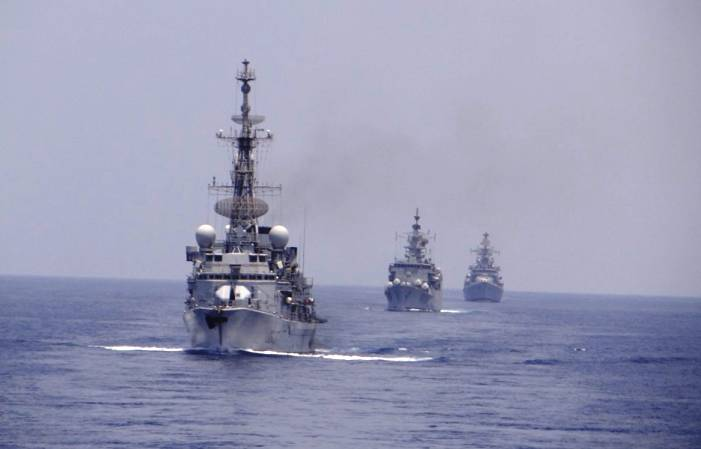
VARUNA–15. French Navy destroyer Jean de Vienne during the exercise with Indian Navy destroyer INS Mumbai and frigate INS Gomati (F21).

The Varuna naval exercise is an annually held bilateral Naval exercise between India and France and it forms and integral part of France–India strategic relationship in the 21st century and consists of naval cooperation drills between the French Navy and the Indian Navy. The joint-exercises are held either in the Indian Ocean or Mediterranean Sea with the aim of improving Indo-French coordination on capabilities like cross-deck operations, replenishment-at-sea, minesweeping, anti-submarine warfare and information sharing. It was first started in 1983, though given its present name in 2001. France is a Littoral State of the Indian Ocean through the French Overseas region of Réunion, Mayotte and Scattered Islands in the Indian Ocean.

== Editions ==
=== 2001 ===
The First edition was conducted in 2001.

=== 2015 ===
Varuna 2015 included a French battle-group led by French aircraft carrier Charles de Gaulle (R91) and carrying aero-naval version of Rafale aircraft operating alongside the Western Naval Command.

=== 2019 ===
The 2019 edition show the participation of French aircraft carrier Charles de Gaulle (R91), surface ships like FNS Forbin, FNS Provence, FNS Latouche-Treville, tanker FNS Marne and a nuclear submarine. The Indian Navy sent its aircraft carrier INS Vikramaditya, destroyer INS Mumbai, frigate INS Tarkash, and fleet tanker INS Deepak.

=== 2023 ===
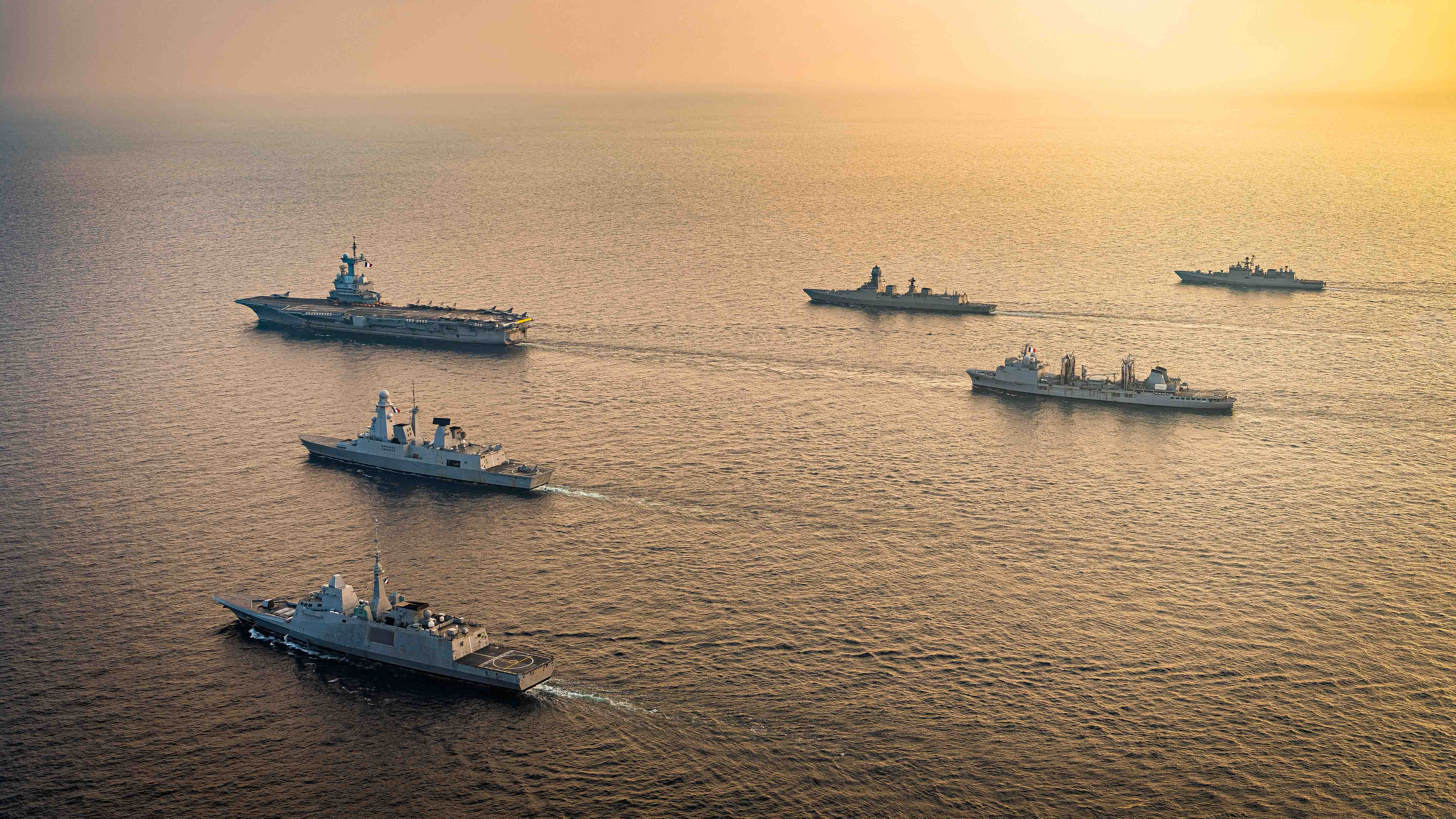
The task group of Charles de Gaulle during Varuna 2023.

The 2023 edition of Varuna exercise, which also saw the 25th anniversary of the strategic partnership, was held between 16 and 20 January 2023 along the Goa coast. The Indian Navy was represented by INS Chennai (destroyer), INS Teg (frigate), Boeing P-8I (maritime patrol aircraft), integral helicopters and MiG-29K jets. The French Navy was represented by French aircraft carrier Charles de Gaulle (R91), frigates FS Forbin and Provence, support vessel FS Marne and an Bregut Atlantique Maritime Patrol Aircraft.

=== 2024 ===
The 2024 edition of Varuna exercise is scheduled from 2 to 4 September 2024 in the Mediterranean Sea. The Indian Navy participates in the exercise with INS Tabar and Boeing P-8I Neptune aircraft. The exercise depicts the first European deployment of the P-8I aircraft after it landed at Hyères airbase. This is 63 years after an Alize aircraft deployed on INS Vikrant last operated from France from the same airbase.

The Indian Navy was represented by INS Tabar, a shipborne helicopter and LRMRAl P-8I aircraft. The French Navy was represented by FS Provence, Submarine Suffren, Aircraft F20; 1 Bréguet 1150 Atlantic, 1 Aermacchi MB-339 and 1 NHIndustries NH90; 1 Eurocopter AS365 Dauphin.

=== 2025 ===
The 23rd edition of the exercise was conducted between 19 and 22 March 2025. The aircraft carriers INS Vikrant and Charles de Gaulle, alongside their fighter aircraft, destroyers, frigates, and a Kalvari-class submarine. The exercise would include an anti-submarine warfare, air defence, air-to-air combat drills including Rafale-M and MiG-29K.

During the deployment, INS Vikrant and INS Deepak was diverted for a MEDEVAC operation from MV Heilan Star on early 21 March after receiving information from Indian Coast Guard's Maritime Rescue Coordination Centre (MRCC) at Mumbai. A Seaking helicopter from Vikrant rescued three crew members, who suffered severe burn injuries, from the ship, flown to INS Hansa in Goa and transferred to a civil hospital for further medical care.

As for the anti submarine manual the Indian submarine played as the aggressor while Indian and French anti-submarine frigates were deployed to protect a high-value target, Jacques Chevallier, the French Navy oiler.

Other operations also included surface warfare manoeuvres as well as replenishment at sea by fleet tankers of both the Navies, INS Deepak and Jacques Chevallier.

=== 2026 ===
On 22 September 2026, INS Trishul (F43) called at Toulon, France to represent the Indian Navy in the 24th edition of Exercise Varuna with the French Navy.

== See also ==
- AIKEYME
- Exercise Malabar
- Exercise Milan
