= Maritime Partnership Exercise =

Indian Navy's Maritime Exercise

Maritime Partnership Exercise (MPX) is a multilateral event conducted by Indian Navy in which naval forces of foreign countries participate. This exercise is conducted as part of the Indian Navy's ongoing efforts to enhance its operational capabilities and strengthen its partnerships with friendly nations. MPX underscores India's commitment to promoting regional stability and security.

As on 31 October 2022, Indian Navy has engaged in 47 Maritime Partnership Exercises with navies of 28 countries - Algeria, Australia, Brazil, Egypt, France, Germany, Greece, Indonesia, Iran, Italy, Japan, Kuwait, Madagascar, Malaysia, Malta, Morocco, Myanmar, Nigeria, Oman, Russia, Saudi Arabia, South Africa, South Korea, Spain, Sri Lanka, Sudan, Tanzania, Togo and the US

The activities and drills during the exercise are designed to provide a comprehensive training experience for naval personnel, covering a broad spectrum of skills and competencies. The exercise is aimed to enhance the readiness and preparedness of naval forces, enabling them to respond effectively to a range of operational scenarios. The inclusion of multiple tough maritime situations ensures that participants are exposed to a variety of challenges, enabling them to develop their skills and knowledge in a dynamic and engaging environment.

== India-France-UAE ==
Aiming to enhance the interoperability and cooperation between the three nations' naval forces as well as to strengthen their maritime security capabilities, this exercise is seen as a significant step towards promoting regional stability and security in the Gulf of Oman, which is a crucial maritime route for global trade.

=== 2023 ===
The inaugural India, France, and UAE Maritime Partnership Exercise was launched on 7 June 2023, in the Gulf of Oman. The exercise involved the participation of INS Tarkash and French Ship Surcouf, both equipped with integral helicopters, French Rafale aircraft, and UAE Navy Dash-8 Maritime Patrol Aircraft. The two-day event encompassed a diverse range of naval operations, including Surface Warfare, which entailed tactical firing and drills for Missile engagements on surface targets, Helicopter Cross Deck Landing Operations, Advanced Air Defence Exercise, and Boarding operations. Additionally, the exercise incorporated cross embarkation of personnel to facilitate the exchange of best practices.

== India-Australia ==
=== 2022 ===
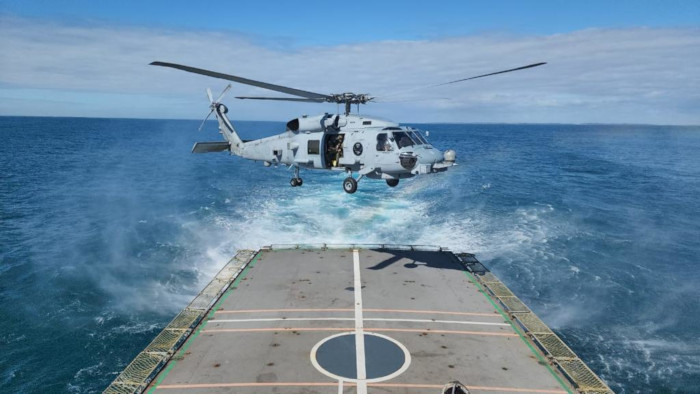
Australian Navy helicopter of HMAS Anzac approaching INS Sumedha's flight deck during a Maritime Partnership Exercise 2022

Royal Australian Navy (RAN) ships HMAS Adelaide along with HMAS Anzac participated in Maritime Partnership Exercise held in the Bay of Bengal during 2-3 November 2022, with the Indian Navy Ships Jalashwa and Kavaratti, including their embarked helicopters. The tactical manoeuvrees, helicopter landings, and amphibious operations incorporated in the training exercises demonstrated the significant level of interoperability between the two navies.

== India-Bahrain ==
=== 2021 ===
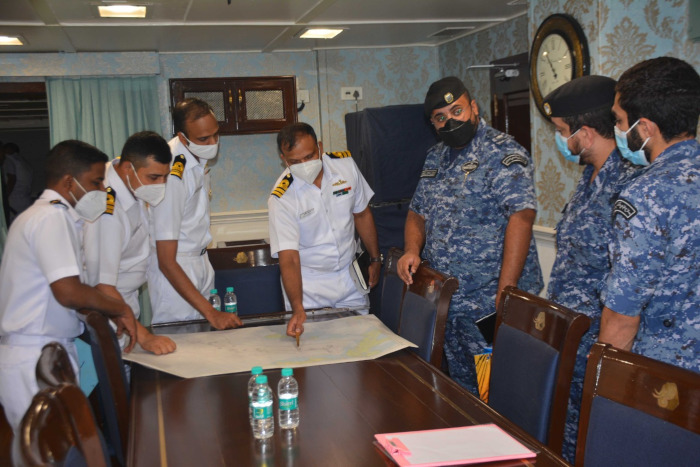
India-Bahrain Maritime Partnership Exercise 2021

During its deployment in the Persian Gulf, INS Kochi visited Manama in Bahrain to participate in a four-day Maritime Partnership Exercise (MPX). In preparation for the exercise, a coordination and operational planning conference was held between the Indian Navy and Bahraini Navy teams. The MPX took place on 18 August 2021, and involved joint naval operations between the two navies. This exercise is a testament to the strong partnership and cooperation between India and Bahrain in the maritime domain, and serves to enhance the interoperability and readiness of both navies.

== India-Egypt ==
=== 2021 ===
The INS Tabar recently engaged in a maritime partnership exercise with the ENS Alexandria, a frontline frigate of the Egyptian Navy, in the Mediterranean Sea on 5 September 2021. The training regimen encompassed a range of activities, such as practising manoeuvrees in an environment with uneven threats, executing operations to intercept suspicious vessels on the open sea, refining communication protocols, collaborating on the creation of a comprehensive maritime domain picture, and conducting exercises for replenishing supplies while at sea. This exercise was conducted to enhance cooperation and interoperability between the two navies.

== India-France ==
India and France are both maritime nations that possess thriving maritime economies, encompassing diverse sectors such as marine technology, scientific research, fisheries, ports, shipping etc.

=== 2022 ===
The INS Tarkash, a guided-missile frigate of the Indian Navy, recently undertook a long-range overseas deployment and engaged in a Maritime Partnership Exercise (MPX) with French Navy Fleet Tanker Somme in the North Atlantic Ocean on 29 and 30 July. Subsequently, collaborative aerial manoeuvrees were conducted, wherein the Falcon 50 maritime surveillance aircraft was involved in numerous simulated missile confrontations and air defence exercises. The MPX served as an opportunity for both navies to exchange best practices and enhance their interoperability in a challenging maritime environment.

=== 2023 ===
The exercise conducted in the Arabian Sea on 10 and 11 March had India's indigenously built INS Sahyadri, a guided missile frigate, engaging alongside French Navy ships the FS Dixmude, a Mistral Class Amphibious Assault Ship, and the La Fayette, a La Fayette Class Frigate. The event served as an opportunity for both navies to enhance their interoperability and strengthen their maritime capabilities through joint training and exercises.

On 30 June, the Bay of Bengal witnessed a Maritime Partnership Exercise (MPX) between the French Navy ship FS Surcouf and two Indian naval vessels, INS Rana and INS Sumedha. The drill encompassed a range of activities, including professional and social engagements, athletic competitions, and cross-deck visits along with training exercises involving a range of strategic manoeuvrees.

== India-Indonesia ==
India and Indonesia have recently upgraded their bilateral relations to a Comprehensive Strategic Partnership, which encompasses the joint effort to combat cross-border terrorism. Additionally, the two nations have entered into 15 agreements, including one aimed at enhancing defence cooperation, and have expressed their support for the freedom of navigation in the Indo-Pacific region, which is of strategic importance. This development is indicative of the growing significance of the relationship between India and Indonesia, and highlights their shared commitment to promoting regional stability and security.

=== 2023 ===
Indigenously designed and built Project-17 class stealth frigate INS Sahyadri and INS Kolkata, the first indigenously designed and built stealth destroyer of the Project-15A class reached Jakarta for MPX in July. The two navies participate in a diverse array of professional engagements, including joint yoga sessions, sports competitions, and cross-deck visits, with the objective of enhancing mutual cooperation and understanding.

== India-Italy ==
=== 2021 ===
On 4 and 5 July 2021, the INS Tabar, Talwar-class stealth Frigate engaged in a Maritime Partnership Exercise with the ITS Antonio Marceglia (F 597), a frontline frigate of the Italian Navy, in the Tyrrhenian Sea. The drill encompassed a diverse array of naval manoeuvrees, comprising air defence protocols, replenishment procedures while at sea, communication exercises, and cross-deck helicopter operations conducted both during daylight hours and at night.

The exercise proved to be advantageous for navies of both countries involved, as it contributed to the improvement of interoperability and the strengthening of joint efforts aimed at countering potential dangers in the maritime domain.

== India-Japan ==
The escalating presence of China in the Indian Ocean, which is regarded as the Indian Navy's domain, has raised significant apprehensions. In order to strengthen their maritime ties, the two nations have been conducting frequent manoeuvrees in the Indian Ocean Region. The Indian Navy and Japanese Maritime Self Defence Force (JMSDF) have been engaging in close collaboration across multiple domains, thereby assuming a pivotal role in safeguarding the security of international maritime commerce and striving towards the preservation of global commons.

=== 2022 ===
INS Shivalik and INS Kadmatt undertook MPX with JMSDF Ships JS Uraga and JS Hirado in the Bay of Bengal on 13 January 2022. The two vessels belonging to Minesweeper Division One of the Japan Maritime Self-Defense Force are currently deployed in the Indian Ocean Region. The entirety of the activity was organised and executed in a manner that did not involve physical contact, thus complying with the COVID-19 safety regulations.

On 23 July 2022, a Maritime Partnership Exercise (MPX) was carried out in the Andaman Sea between the Japan Maritime Self Defense Force and the Indian Navy. The operational interaction involved the participation of INS Sukanya - an offshore patrol vessel, and JS Samidare - a Murasame class destroyer. Both engaged in a range of exercises, including seamanship activities, aircraft operations, and tactical manoeuvrees.

=== 2023 ===
On 11 March 2023, the INS Sahyadri, a Shivalik-class stealth multi-role frigate exercised with JS Suzutsuki, an Akizuki-class destroyer in the Arabian Sea. With the objective of reinforcing their mutual dedication to regional and global security concerns, the exercise featured cross-deck landings executed by integral helicopters, tactical manoeuvrees, and a customary steampast by the vessels of both navies. This exercise highlighted the robust naval connections and the exceptional degree of interoperability between the two nations within the maritime sphere.

== India-Kenya ==
=== 2023 ===
On 20 June 2023, INS Sunayna visited Mombasa, Kenya for MPX. The Indian and Kenyan naval crews engaged in a series of exercises, including firefighting and damage control, boarding manoeuvrees, and simulations of asymmetric threats.

== India-Malaysia ==
India and Malaysia maintain a strong and enduring relationship, underpinned by robust people-to-people ties, a shared history, and well-established trade links. A key component of the bilateral cooperation between the two nations is their collaboration in the areas of defense, and security. This partnership is characterized by regular exchanges between their armed forces, which serve to strengthen their mutual understanding and enhance their collective capabilities.

=== 2022 ===
On 27 August 2022, INS Sumedha, as a part of the Indian Navy's long-range operational deployment, visited Port Klang in Malaysia. The objective was to bolster the bilateral relations and augment the maritime collaboration and interoperability between the Indian Navy and the Royal Malaysian Navy (RMN). The crew of INS Sumedha participated in professional interactions, Subject Matter Expert Exchanges (SMEE), cross-deck visits etc.

== India-Morocco ==
=== 2021 ===
INS Tabar, as part of her overseas deployment visited Casablanca in Morocco on 25 August 2021. It engaged in MPX alongside the Royal Moroccan Navy's Descubierta class 'Lieutenant Colonel Errhamani'. The exercise encompassed various activities, including communication drills, replenishment at sea procedures, and naval manoeuvrees. The exercise culminated in the customary 'Steam Past' between the two ships, symbolising a farewell gesture.

== India-Oman ==
=== 2023 ===
The Indian Navy and the Royal Navy of Oman participate in various avenues of foreign cooperation, including operations, training, and the exchange of Subject Matter Experts across diverse fields. INS Visakhapatnam, a Guided Missile Destroyer that has been designed and constructed indigenously in India, arrived in Oman on 30 July to participate in the MPX which commenced on 3 August 2023.

== India-Sudan ==
=== 2021 ===
The Indian Navy and Sudanese Navy conducted MPX in the Red Sea, situated along the coast of Sudan. INS Tabar engaged with Sudanese Navy ships- Almazz and Nimer during the first episode of a collaborative maritime exercise between the two navies on 10 September 2021. The exercise encompassed a diverse array of naval operations, comprising coordinated manoeuvring, replenishment at sea drills, helo operations, interdiction of suspect vessels at sea, and communication procedures.

== India-UAE ==
India and United Arab Emirates aims to enhance the collaboration between the two Navies to effectively address shared challenges such as piracy, smuggling, and human trafficking, while also strengthening maritime security and conducting joint operations for Humanitarian Assistance & Disaster Relief.

=== 2023 ===
INS Visakhapatnam - one of the largest operational Destroyer in Indian Navy and INS Trikand -an advance stealth frigate carried out MPX in August with UAE Naval Forces ships Baynunah and AlFutaisi in Dubai. The objective was to augment the interoperability and synergy of the two naval forces through mutual training on tactics, techniques, and procedures, while concurrently fostering stronger professional relationships.

== India-UK ==
=== 2024 ===
In March 2024, maintenance of RFA Argus and RFA Lyme Bay was undertaken at the Larsen & Toubro's Kattupalli Shipyard in India. The ships were escorted by HMS Diamond, had transited through the Red Sea to reach India. In April 2024, LRG(S) participated in Maritime Partnership Exercise with Indian Navy's Eastern Fleet in the Indian Ocean. The exercise included stealth frigate INS Sahyadri. The tasks conducted in the exercise included "Tactical manoeuvres, boarding ops, surface engagement against simulated asymmetric threats, cross deck visits & cross deck helo ops."
