= INS Sunayna =

Indian Navy patrol boat

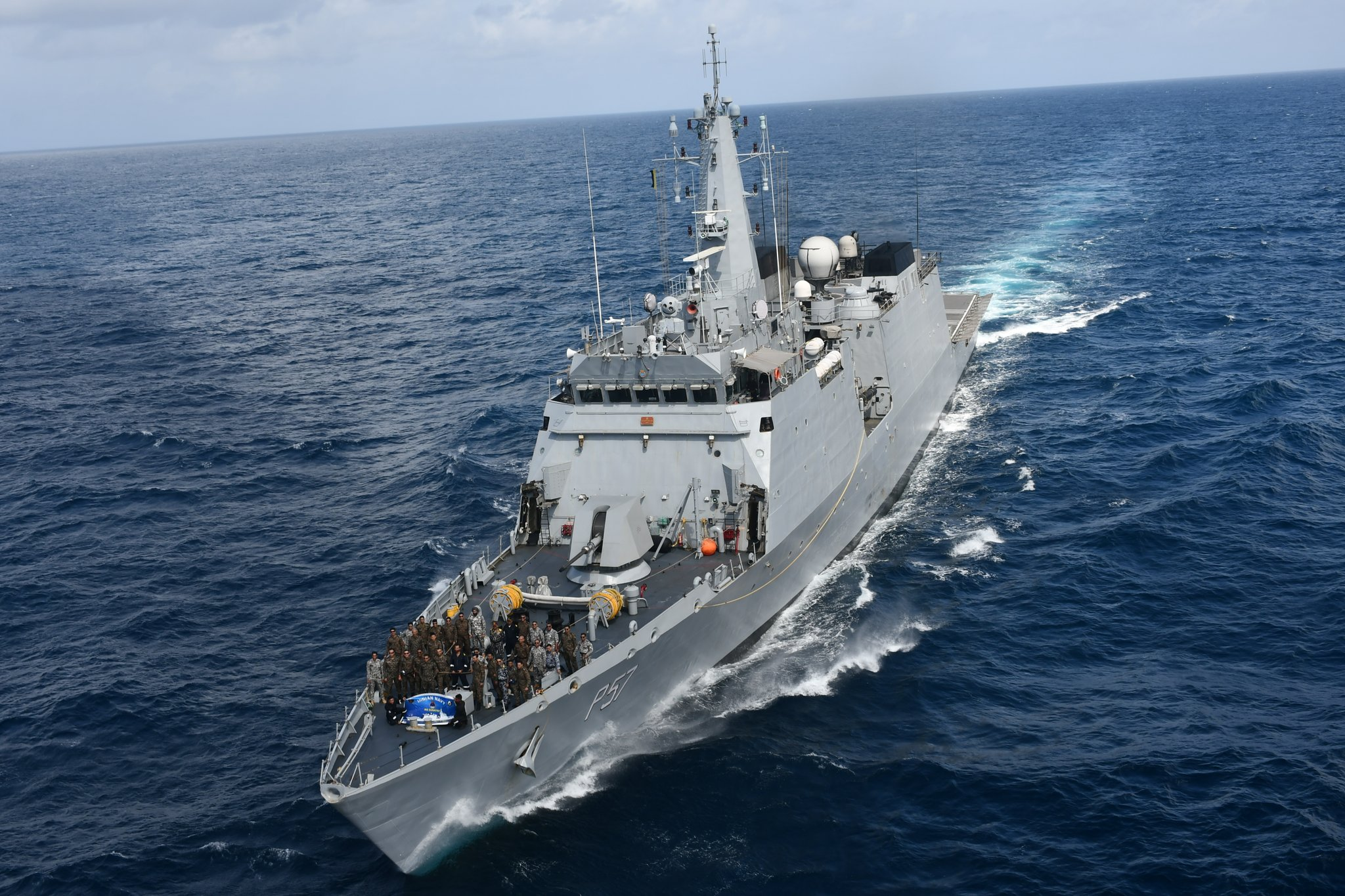
- INS Sunayna at sea.

History

India
- Name: INS Sunayna
- Namesake: Sumitra
- Operator: Indian Navy
- Builder: Goa Shipyard Limited
- Launched: 14 November 2009
- Commissioned: 15 October 2013
- Identification: Pennant number: P57
- Status: Active

General characteristics
- Class & type: Saryu-class patrol vessel
- Tonnage: 2,200 tonnes (2,200 long tons; 2,400 short tons)
- Length: 105 m (344 ft)
- Propulsion: Two KOEL/Pielstick Diesel engines
- Speed: 25 knots (46 km/h; 29 mph)
- Range: 6,000 nautical miles (11,000 km; 6,900 mi) at 16 knots (30 km/h; 18 mph)
- Complement: Eight officers and 108 sailors
- Armament: OTO Melara 76 mm SRGM naval gun; AK-630 CIWS; Chaff launchers

INS Sunayna is the second Saryu-class patrol vessel of the Indian Navy, designed and constructed indigenously by the Goa Shipyard Limited. It is designed to undertake fleet support operations, coastal and offshore patrolling, ocean surveillance and monitoring of sea lines of communications and offshore assets and escort duties.

== Service history ==
The keel laying of the ship was done on 25 September 2007, it was launched on 14 November 2009, was delivered to the navy for sea trials on 3 September 2013, and got commissioned into active service on 15 October 2013 at Kochi, her home port.

She will be deployed for anti-piracy operations in the Gulf of Aden.

In June 2018 she was deployed to Yemen's Socotra island as part of "Operation Nistar", an HADR mission to evacuate around 38 stranded Indian nationals in/around Socotra, after a cyclone hit the area.

INS Sunayna, along with INS Chennai, was sent to the Persian Gulf and Gulf of Oman in June 2019 to protect Indian shipping interests amid tensions in the Strait of Hormuz.

INS Sunayna visited Durban, South Africa from 21 to 25 August 2023. The ship participated in Maritime Partnership Exercise with SAS Sekhukhune I, a Warrior-class inshore patrol vessel, off Durban. Later, INS Sunayna also visited Port Victoria, Seychelles from 3 to 6 September 2023 where the crew of the ship interacted with the personnel of Seychelles Coast Guard.

INS Sunayna went to Port Victoria, Seychelles on 15 June 2024, along with SCGS Zoroaster after the latter ship completed her minor refit at GRSE. She participated with Seychelles Coast Guard for their EEZ surveillance patrol under Commander Prabhat Ranjan Mishra. The ship visited Port Louis, Mauritius from 20 to 22 June 2024 and participated in a surveillance exercise with Mauritius Coast Guard. On 26 June 2024, INS Sunayna revisited Port Victoria along with a marching contingent and a band both of which will participate in the military parade of the 48th Seychelles National Day celebrations on 29 June 2024. An aerial demonstration of the naval variant of ALH Dhruv is also planned during the visit.

She participated at the International Fleet Review 2026 held at Visakapatanam.

== IOS Sagar ==
=== 2025 ===
INS Sunayna had been deployed to the Southwest Indian Ocean under the Indian Navy's Indian Ocean Ship (IOS) Sagar initiative, where the ship was operated by a mixed crew from Indian Navy and 44 sailors from nine Friendly Foreign Countries including Comoros, Kenya, Madagascar, Maldives, Mauritius (2 officers and 6 sailors), Mozambique, Seychelles, Sri Lanka and South Africa. The deployment spanned over a month between 5 April and 8 May 2025. The port call destinations included Dar-es-Salaam, Nacala, Port Louis, Port Victoria and Malé and the ship undertakook Joint Surveillance of Exclusive Economic Zone (EEZ) of Tanzania, Mozambique, Mauritius and Seychelles. The FFC personnel who were onboard also underwent two week capsule training at Kochi beforehand.

The personnel also observed the harbour phase of the maiden edition of the multilateral maritime exercise, Africa India Key Maritime Engagement, co-hosted by the Indian Navy and Tanzania People's Defence Force at Dar-es-Salaam.

On 3 April 2025, IOS Sagar completed its harbour and sea training phase at Southern Naval Command, Kochi and left for Karwar. On 5 April, the ship was flagged off by the Indian Defence Minister Rajnath Singh for its deployment from Karwar. The ship arrived at Dar-es-Salaam on 12 April for its firat port call for 3 days. During this time the ship will participate in the harbour phase of Exercise AIKEYME. Between 17 and 20 April the ship completed its port call at Nacala port, Mozambique. On 26 April 2025, the ship arrived at Port Louis after completing Phase I of Joint EEZ surveillance with the Mauritius National Coast Guard. The port call was for two days which was followed by the Phase II of Joint EEZ surveillance. The ship arrived in Pot Victoria, Seychelles on 1 May 2025. The ship departed the port the next day. After completing its mission, the ship returned to Kochi in May 2025.

=== 2026 ===
The second edition of IOS Sagar commenced on 16 March 2026. The edition is being held with India as the chairman of the Indian Ocean Naval Symposium (IONS) from the 20 February 2026 and includes participants from 16 friendly foreign countries which are IONS members. The programme commenced with professional training interactions in Indian Naval Training Establishments in Kochi. This will be followed by the deployment of INS Sunayna operated by crew from the Indian Navy and foreign participants.

The Harbour Training Phase concluded on 27 March 2026. The Indian Defence Minister, Rajnath Singh, flagged off the ship from the Mumbai Harbour on 2 April. Commander Siddharth Chaudhary is the commanding officer of the ship. The ship departed Malé, Maldives on 8 April following which it conducted a passage exercise (PASSEX) with CGS Ghazee (P802) of the MNDF Coast Guard. The ship departed the Phuket, Thailand on 17 April following a three-day port call for an operational turnaround. After transiting the straits of Malacca and Singapore, the ship called on the Port of Jakarta, Indonesia on 21 April. The Sea Phase of the mission will last until May 2026. She called at the Changi Naval Base, Singapore from 26 to 29 April 2026. Later, the ship entered the Yangon Harbour, Myanmar on 4 May. This coincided with the official four-day visit of the Chief of the Naval Staff, Admiral Dinesh K Tripathi to the nation. The ship was escorted into Chattogram Port, Bangladesh by BNS Ali Haider on 8 May. On 12 May, she departed Chattogram. Thereafter, she called at the Port of Colombo, Sri Lanka on 15 May. The crew will make cultural visits to Colombo Port, Galle, Kandy and Pinnawala. The ship will depart on 18 May after a Passage Exercise (PASSEX) with the Sri Lanka Navy.

== Gallery ==
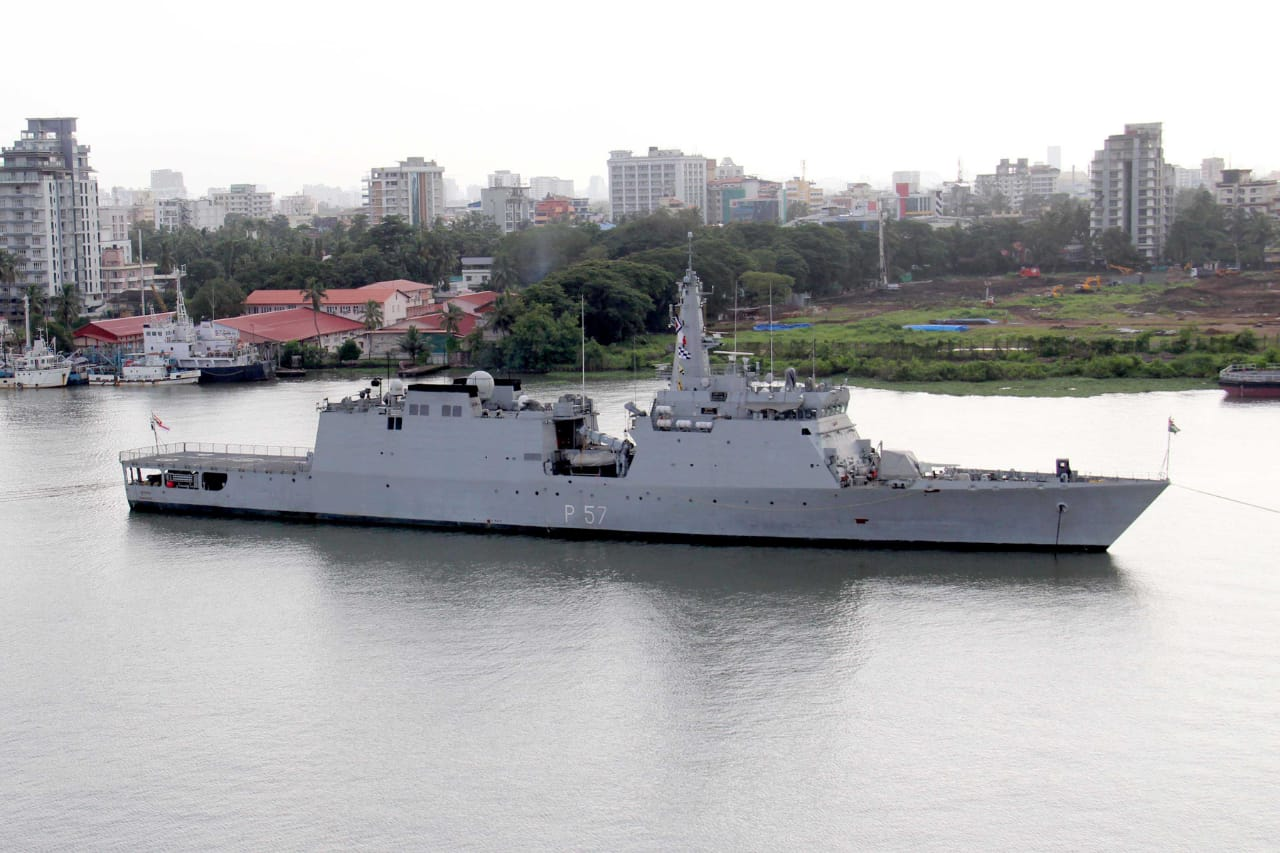
Sunayna returns to Kochi post an 80 day anti piracy patrol in the Gulf of Aden in May 2020.

== See also ==
- Sukanya-class patrol vessel
