= FV Ekawat Nava 5 =

Hijacked trawler sunk by Indian Navy in 2008

History

Kiribati
- Name: Ekawat Nava 5
- Owner: Sirichai Fisheries
- Operator: Sirichai Fisheries
- Captured: 18 November 2008
- Fate: Sunk by gunfire on 18 November 2008

FV Ekawat Nava 5 was a hijacked Kiribati-flagged, Thai-owned deep-sea fishing trawler that was sunk by INS Tabar of the Indian Navy on 18 November 2008. The trawler sank when a fire broke out on the vessel after INS Tabar retaliated to being fired upon by pirates on board. All but one crew member of the trawler were believed killed.

== Accounts of the incident ==
Ekawat Nava 5 had a crew of 15 Thais and one Cambodian. It was travelling from Oman to Yemen when it was hijacked on 18 November 2008.

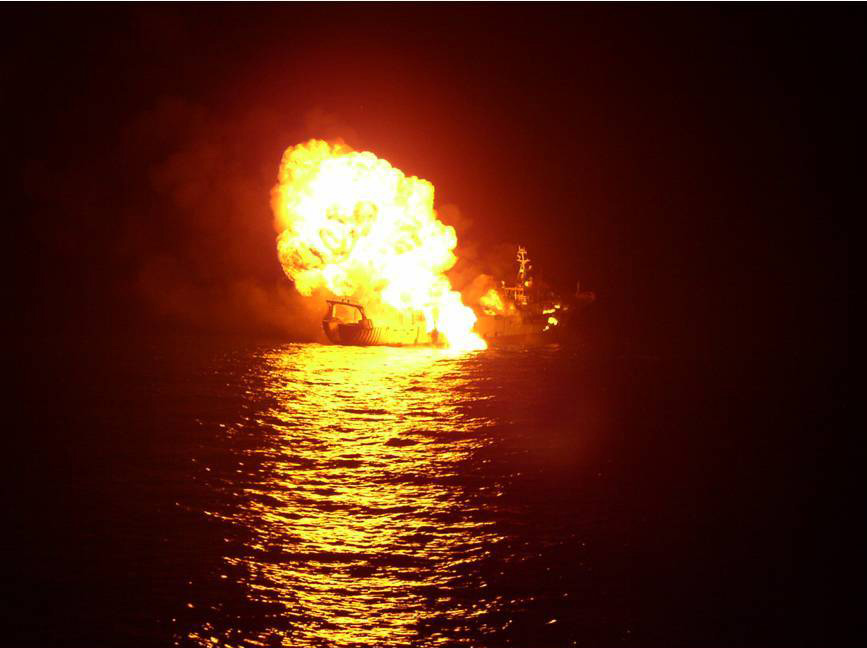
Anti-piracy operations by INS Tabar in the Gulf of Aden on 18 November 2008

On the evening of 18 November, INS Tabar was on patrol 285 nautical miles (528 km) southwest of Salalah, Oman (near 14°17.15′N 50°15.7′E), when it spotted the hijacked trawler. The vessel was identified by the frigate as a pirate mother ship, as it had two speed boats in tow and men armed with rocket-propelled grenades (RPGs) and assault rifles on its deck. The frigate ordered the trawler to be boarded for inspection. Upon being refused and threatened by the pirates, the frigate continued to follow the trawler.

The official account from the Indian Navy states that the pirates fired at the frigate with an RPG. The frigate fired back in retaliation. Explosions were later heard on board the trawler, possibly due to ammunition or fuel stored on its deck. The trawler sank as a result of the fire.

The Indian Navy reported that following the fire on board the vessel, it spotted only the two speed boats fleeing from the scene. It pursued the boats and found one abandoned. It lost track of the other boat in the darkness.

An account of the incident narrated by the Thai representative of its owner, Sirichai Fisheries, based on information provided by a surviving Thai crew member, states that Somali pirates had boarded and just taken control of the trawler when INS Tabar arrived on the scene. The crewmember's account stated that the trawler had not been used as a pirate mother ship.

Of the original crewmembers of the trawler, the only survivor was picked up by a passing merchant vessel, one was later confirmed dead, while 14 others were reported missing by the owner. The crew of INS Tabar reported seeing only the two motor boats fleeing from the scene of the incident in the darkness. They did not spot any of the original crew of the trawler. The fate of the remaining crew was unknown.

An account of the incident from the US Department of State, may have originally stated that the Indian Navy captured some of the pirates. This was however not confirmed by the Indian Navy.
