= Africa-India Key Maritime Engagement =

Multilateral naval exercise hosted by the Indian Navy

Africa-India Key Maritime Engagement also called AIKEYME (lit. 'Unity') is a biennial naval exercise that will be conducted by India and African Countries. The exercise is aimed at enhancing interoperability among the countries and enhancing diplomatic and operational ties between nations. The Exercise was first announced in March 2025.

== List of editions ==
=== 2025 ===
The maiden edition of the naval exercise was conducted between 13 and 18 April 2025. The exercise was co-hosted by the Indian Navy and the Tanzania People's Defence Force in Dar-es-Salaam, Tanzania with additional participation from nine other countries including Comoros, Djibouti, Eritrea, Kenya, Madagascar, Mauritius, Mozambique, Seychelles and South Africa. It would have a Harbour Phase (13-15 April) including table-top and command post exercises focused on anti-piracy operations and information sharing, alongside joint training in seamanship and Visit Board Search and Seizure (VBSS) simulations and a Sea Phase (16-18 April) including drills, search and rescue operations, VBSS, small arms training and helicopter operations. INS Sunayna, under its IOS Sagar mission designation, will also witness the Harbour Phase. The other Indian Navy ships to participate in the exercise included INS Chennai and INS Kesari to the exercise. Meanwhile, INS Sunayna would depart the port on 15 April for its next leg of Sagar mission.

INS Chennai and INS Kesari completed the exercise and left the port Dar-es-Salaam on 19 April 2025.

== See also ==
- Exercise Malabar
- Exercise Varuna
- Exercise Milan
- TROPEX
