= 2008 in piracy =

There were 49 ships reported pirate attacks in the first three months of 2008, up from 41 in that period of 2007. According to the ICC International Maritime Bureau, in those attacks: "Seven crew members were taken hostage, six kidnapped, three killed and one missing – presumed dead." Up until mid-November 2008, more than 90 vessels had been attacked by pirates in the year. At the same time, with a more than 75 per cent increase since the previous year, pirates were holding 13 ships captive in the Somali ports of Eyl and Hobyo.

- 1 February – Somali pirates seize the Russian-built tugboat, Svitzer Korsakov.
- 17 March – Svitzer Korsakov was released after ransom of $700,000 was paid.
- 4 April – Somali pirates seize the French sail cruise ship, Le Ponant, with its 30 crew members. No passengers were aboard at the time.
- 12 April – After a $2m (£1m) ransom was paid, the crew of the Le Ponant are released. Hours later, French soldiers deployed by helicopter seize 6 pirates ashore in their village and recover part of the ransom.
- 19 April – Somali pirates seize the Spanish fishing boat, Playa de Bakio with its 26 crew.
- 21 April – Somali pirates seize the Dubai freighter, Al-Khaleej.
- 22 April – Puntland troops board the Al-Khaleej, killing one pirate and arresting seven others. The ship's crew were all rescued unharmed. Eleven pirates and associates would be sentenced to life imprisonment the next week.
- 26 April – Playa de Bakio and crew released after a reported $1.2 million ransom was paid.
- 17 May – Victoria carrying 4,000 tons of donated sugar was hijacked 55 km off Somalia.
- 20 July – MV Stella Maris, a Japanese-owned bulk carrier with a 20 all-Filipino crew was seized.
- 12 August – MV Thor Star, a Thai freighter delivering plywood to Aden was seized.
- 12 August – MT Yengeoa Ocean, a Nigerian tugboat was seized.
- 19 August – MT Bunga Melati 5, a Malaysian chemical freighter was seized.
- 21 August – MT Irene, a Japanese-owned tanker with 16 Filipinos and four other foreign nationals was seized.
- 21 August – MV Iran Deyanat, an Iranian dry bulk carrier was seized.
- 21 August – MV BBC Trinidad a German heavy lift project vessel was seized.
- 2 September – Carre d'as, a French leisure yacht was seized.
- 11 September – MV BBC Trinidad and MT Irene was released after ransom paid.
- 15 September – MT Stolt Valor, a Hong Kong chemical tanker with 18 Indians, 2 Filipinos and 13 other nationals was seized.
- 16 September – French commandoes stormed Carre d'as, a French leisure yacht to release the ship.
- 17 September – MV Centauri, a Greek chemical tanker was seized with a crew of 25 Filipinos.
- 21 September – MV Capt Stefanos, Greek freighter carrying coal was seized with 19 crew members.
- 25 September – MV Faina, a Ukrainian freighter carrying small arms and 33 T-72 tanks for Kenya, was seized.
- 26 September – MV Genius, a Greek chemical tanker was seized.
- 27 September – MT Bunga Melati 5, a Malaysian chemical tanker was released after a ransom of $2 million was paid.
- 27 September – MV Al Monsourah (also spelled Mansourah), an Egyptian ship was released after a ransom of $1.2 million USD was paid.
- 27 September – MV Stella Maris was released after a ransom of $2 million was paid.
- 10 October – MV Wail with a crew of 11 consisted of nine Syrians and two Somalis was seized.
- 10 October – MT Irene which was seized on 21 August was released after a ransom of $1.6 million was paid. MV Iran Dianat (also spelled Deyanat, Deyat) was also released.
- 16 October – Pirates released the crew of MV Bright Ruby after a ransom was paid.
- 15 November – MV Sirius Star, a VLCC tanker was seized.
- 17 November – Pirates release the crew of MT Stolt Valor after a ransom of $2.5 m was paid.
- 21 November – Pirates release the ship and crew of MV Genius after a ransom was paid.
