= MV Iran Deyanat =

History
- Name: MV Iran Deyanat
- Owner: Islamic Republic of Iran Shipping Lines
- Operator: Islamic Republic of Iran Shipping Lines
- Ordered: February 1982
- Builder: Astilleros Españoles S.A. - Factoria de Sestao
- Yard number: 260
- Laid down: March 29, 1982
- Launched: August 5, 1982
- Completed: October 1, 1983
- Identification: IMO number: 8107579, Call sign: EQPB
- Captured: August 21, 2008 – October 10, 2008
- Fate: Scrapped 8 April 2011
- Notes: Sailed originally as Odinlock for Liberia.

General characteristics
- Class & type: Bulk carrier
- Tonnage: 44,468 DWT
- Length: 199.50 m (654 ft 6 in) (LOA)
- Beam: 29.01 m (95 ft 2 in)
- Draught: 11.715 m (38 ft 5.2 in)
- Depth: 16.01 m (52 ft 6 in)
- Installed power: 8,238 kW (11,047 hp)
- Propulsion: 1 fixed pitch propeller
- Speed: 15.25 knots (28.24 km/h; 17.55 mph)
- Capacity: 54,237 m^{3} (1,915,400 cu ft)
- Crew: 29
- Notes: Iron ore strengthened bulk carrier

MV Iran Deyanat (Persian: ایران دیانت) is an Iranian ship (owned and operated by the Islamic Republic of Iran Shipping Lines) that was hijacked in the Gulf of Aden by 40 pirates with Kalashnikovs and RPGs on August 21, 2008. The crew of the ship numbered 29: a Pakistani captain, 14 Iranians including an engineer, 3 Indians, 2 Filipinos, and 10 Croatians. The ship was freed on October 10, and the crew was unharmed. The ship went underway bound to Oman and then to its final destination at Rotterdam.

== Hijacking ==
The ship had declared as cargo minerals and industrial products such as iron ore, but Somali negotiators are alleged to have said that the true cargo included arms and chemical weapons. The Deyanat had departed from China with the purported intent of selling its cargo in Germany, but Somali officials say that the ship was truly headed to Eritrea; in addition, the ship's arrival in the Gulf of Aden was supposedly "suspiciously early." "Many of us ran out on the deck. We saw a group of men in two tiny speedboats close to the ship. The ship’s radar had failed to pick them up. The men were firing in the air," crew member Jeevan Kiran D’Souza said. "There were 16 of them. They threw a ladder fitted with grappling hooks over the side of the ship and clambered aboard. They stormed all cabins and herded the entire crew into a small room, and told the captain to cut the engine." After the hijackers took control of the ship, they used the Deyanat to tow their boats along. They shuttled between Reassban, Reassaaf, and other locations (purportedly to evade rival pirate groups) before meeting their boss, "Abdul Hakeem," and finally mooring off the coast of Eyl in Somalia—which is allegedly the base of a crime syndicate. In fact, multiple other pirated ships were moored near the Deyanat. The number of pirates guarding the ship included 50 on shore and 50 on board.

== Conditions aboard the ship ==
The sailors aboard the ship were limited to two slices of moldy bread and a ration of two cups of water. Though the pirates took $10,000 from the ship's captain and the crew's cell phones, clothes, and possessions, they were allowed to call home for the first two days after the hijacking. The pirates carried guns at all time and negotiations were conducted "at the officer's level," so most of the crew knew nothing of the pirates' demands.

== Ransom ==
A ransom was set at $2 million. US officials reportedly would not comment. At one point the Sunday Times reported that the IRISL paid $200,000 in the first of a series of ransom payments, but the Iranian company denied the claim. The ship "was supposed to be released, but now they are saying the $200,000 was for facilitation only. They want more money for the ransom," said Andrew Mwangura, of the Kenyan-based East African Seafarers' Assistance Programme.

According to Lloyd's List, the IRISL ultimately paid $2.5 million to free the ship.

== Mysterious contents ==
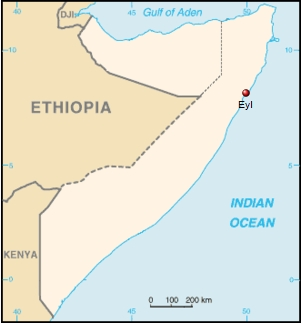
Location of Eyl, where the hijacked Deyanat was stationed

The IRISL, which owns the ship, has been designated for proliferation activity by the U.S. Treasury office, thereby freezing its assets and banning American trade with it, including food and medical supplies, in accordance with US sanctions of Iran. The US accuses the shipping line of "falsifying documents and using deceptive schemes to shroud its involvement in illicit commerce," saying the "IRISL's actions are part of a broader pattern of deception and fabrication that Iran uses to advance its nuclear and missile programs."

Though the ship carried industrial contents such as iron ore, other potentially illegal cargo has been surmised by the blog Long War Journal. According to Long War Journal (which as sources for its reports includes "Somali officials," "independent sources," and chiefly a man named Hassan Allore Osman, listed as Puntland's Minister of Minerals and Oil), some of the pirates who boarded the ship suffered a strange illness, which includes loss of hair and skin burns, and some pirates having died. The pirates tried to access the cargo on the ship, but the containers were locked and the captain and Iranian engineer from the ship's crew gave changing accounts of the cargo's contents. "That ship is unusual," the Long War Journal reports Osman as saying. "It is not carrying a normal shipment."

In addition, Director of the East African's Seafarer's Assistance Programme Andrew Mwangura told South Africa's Sunday Times: “We don’t know exactly how many, but the information that I am getting is that some of them had died. There is something very wrong about that ship." Mwangura, however, did not name the source of his information, so it is not known whether he was referring to the Long War Journal reports.

Experts have said that the accounts of the illness sound more like radiation poisoning than chemical poisoning. "It's baffling," Jonathan Tucker, from the James Martin Center for Nonproliferation Studies, said to Fox News. "I'm not aware of any chemical agent that produces loss of hair within a few days. That's more suggestive of high levels of radioactive waste."

In all, 16 pirates died from the ship's contents. Differing analyses have claimed that the ship's contents were planned to be delivered to Hezbollah or to al-Qaida groups in the Horn of Africa; ultimately, however, the ship berthed at the destination listed on its manifest, Rotterdam, unloading food and minerals.

It has been speculated that the ship's actual destination was Eritrea, and that its cargo was small arms and chemical weapons for Islamist anti-government rebels in Somalia.

== Docking ==
The MV Iran Deyanat arrived at Rotterdam on 11 November 2008. A "multi-disciplinary team comprising inspectors from the port authority, customs and habour [sic] police boarded and searched the ship" and found no hazardous substances on board. The paperwork was in order and the ship was unloaded. Lloyd's List reported that the ship’s charterer—German-based Hinrichs—denied any evidence of pirates falling ill during the hijacking. This contradicts the claims, however, that local officials made to The Times of South Africa.
