= French frigate Provence =

FREMM class multi-purpose frigates in the French Navy

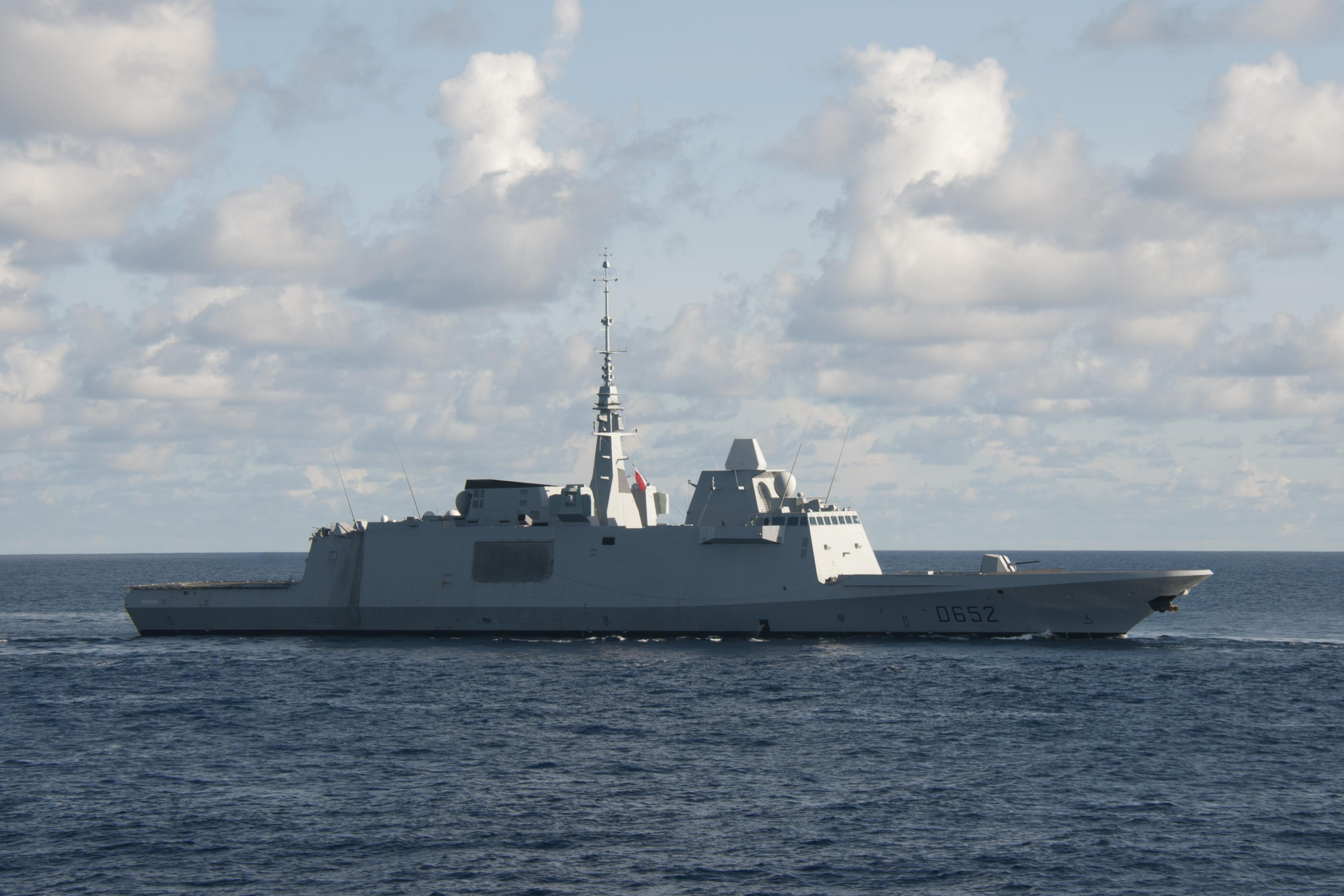
- Provence underway on 21 May 2019

History

France
- Name: Provence
- Namesake: Provence
- Builder: DCNS, Lorient
- Laid down: 15 December 2010
- Launched: 18 September 2013
- Completed: 2015
- Commissioned: 12 June 2015
- Home port: Toulon
- Identification: MMSI number: 227999300; Pennant number: D652
- Status: Active

General characteristics
- Class & type: Aquitaine-class frigate
- Displacement: 6,000 tons
- Length: 466 ft (142.0 m)
- Beam: 65 ft (19.8 m)
- Draught: 16 ft (4.9 m)
- Propulsion: MTU Series 4000 (2.2 MW everyone); CODLOG
- Speed: 27 knots (50 km/h; 31 mph); max cruise speed 15.6 knots (28.9 km/h; 18.0 mph)
- Range: 6,000 nmi (11,000 km; 6,900 mi) at 15 knots (28 km/h; 17 mph)
- Complement: 145
- Sensors & processing systems: Héraklès multi-purpose passive electronically scanned array radar; CAPTAS-4 towed-array sonar; UMS 4110 CL hull-mounted sonar
- Armament: 1 x 76 mm Super Rapid gun; 3 x 20 mm Narwhal remote weapon systems; 16-cell SYLVER A43 VLS for Aster 15 air defense missiles; 16-cell SYLVER A70 VLS for MdCN cruise missiles; 8 x Exocet MM40 Block 3 anti-ship missiles (Block 3c variant entering service with the French Navy from December 2022); 2 x B-515 twin launchers for MU90 torpedoes
- Aircraft carried: 1 × NH90 helicopter
- Aviation facilities: Single hangar

Provence (D652) is an Aquitaine-class frigate of the French Navy. The Aquitaine class were developed as part of the FREMM multipurpose frigate program.

== Development and design ==
Original plans were for 17 FREMM to replace the nine D'Estienne d'Orves-class avisos and nine anti-submarine frigates of the Tourville and Georges Leygues classes. In November 2005 France announced a contract of €3.5 billion for development and the first eight hulls, with options for nine more costing €2.95 billion split over two tranches (totaling 17).

Following the cancellation of the third and fourth of the Horizon-class frigates in 2005 on budget grounds, requirements for an air-defence derivative of the FREMM called FREDA were placed – with DCNS coming up with several proposals. Expectations were that the last two ships of the 17 FREMM planned would be built to FREDA specifications; however, by 2008 the plan was revised down to just 11 FREMM (9 ASW variants and 2 FREDA variants) at a cost of €8.75 billion (FY13, ~US$12 billion). The 11 ships would cost €670 million (~US$760m) each in FY2014, or €860m (~US$980m) including development costs. In 2015, the total number of ASW variants was further reduced to just six units, including Provence.

== Construction and career ==
Provence was developed as part of a joint Italian-French program known as FREMM, which was implemented to develop a new class of frigates for use by various European navies. Construction on the ship began in 2010 and was completed in 2015.

Provence operated in the north of the Indian Ocean from 23 December 2015, and the frigate briefly joined the USS Harry S. Truman carrier strike group, then joined the Charles de Gaulle carrier strike group which in addition to Provence included the frigates Chevalier Paul and La Motte-Picquet, a nuclear attack submarine, the replenishment ship Marne, the British HMS Defender and the German Augsburg, which accompanied them in the crossing of the Strait of Hormuz on 26 December as part of Opération Chammal. The Caiman Marine of the 33F flotilla embarked on Provence was able to show its ability to land on the American aircraft carrier.

In March 2016, as part of Combined Task Force 150, the frigate made a major arms seizure off the coast of Somalia.

From 18 November to 2 December 2021, Provence took part in Exercise Polaris 21 in the western Mediterranean Sea. In October 2022, the frigate participated in joint exercises with the Croatian Navy in the Adriatic Sea.

On 16 March 2025, Provence arrived at the Port of Colombo for a formal visit scheduled to last until 20 March 2025.

== Gallery ==
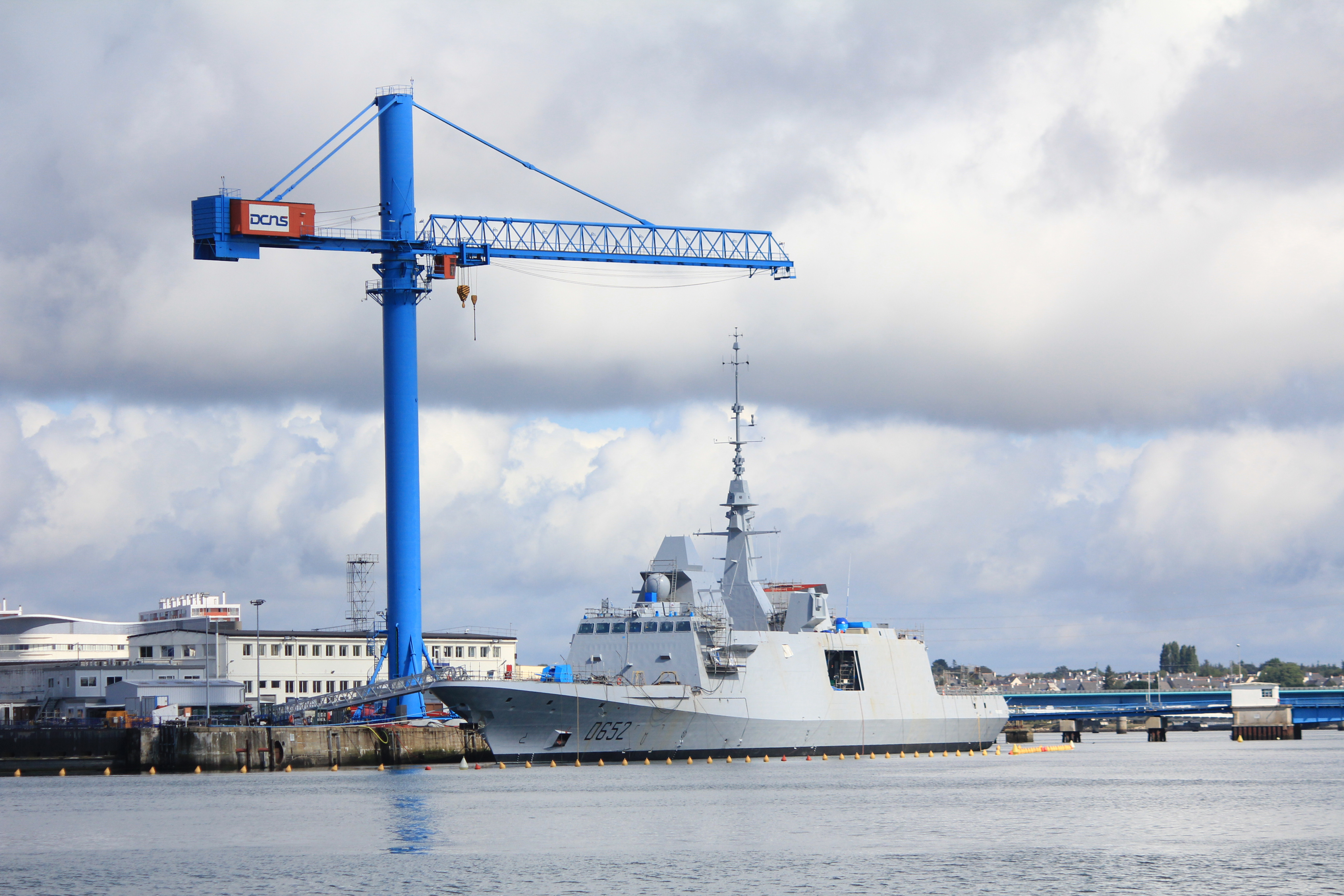
Provence at Lorient on 2 August 2014.

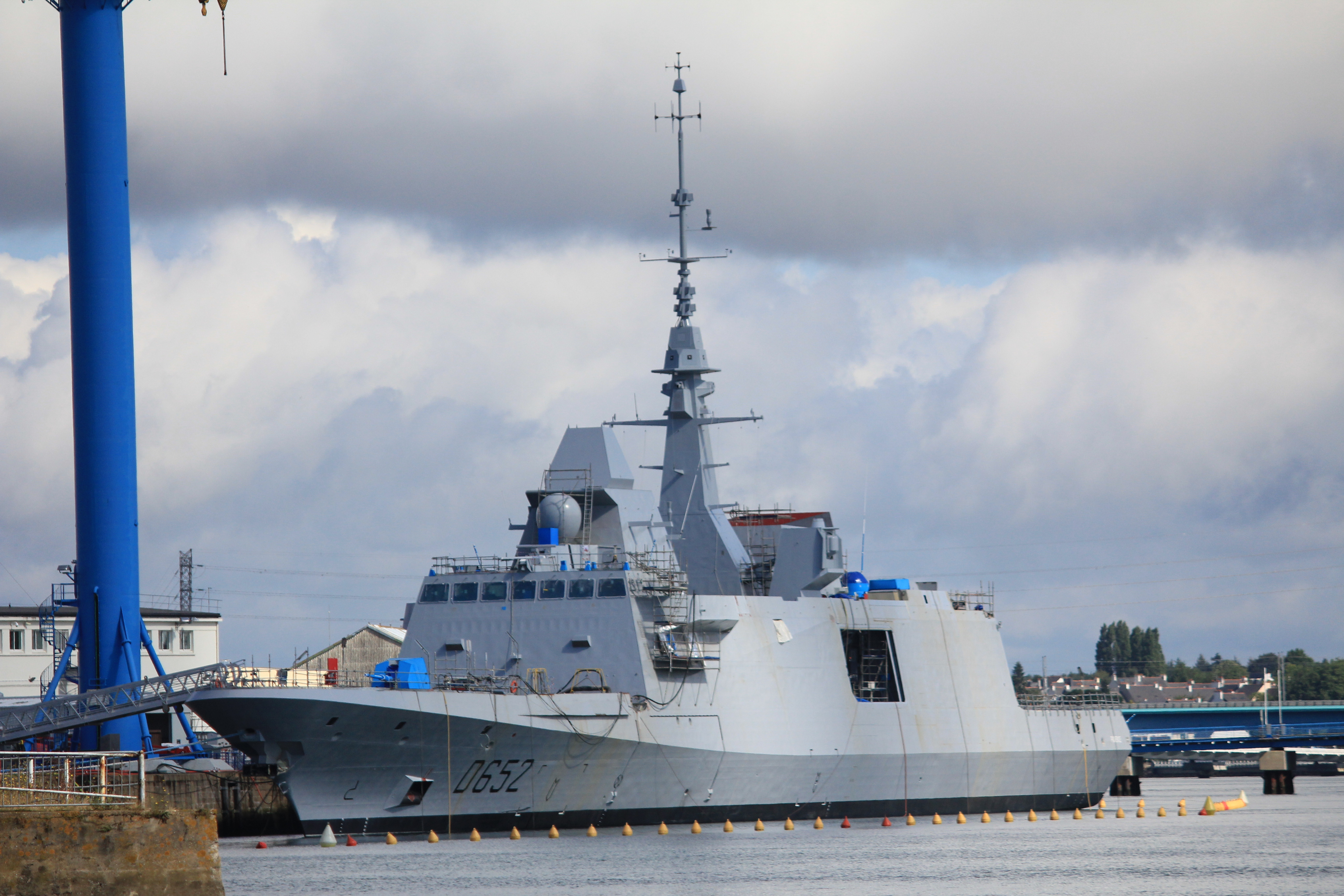
Provence at Lorient on 2 August 2014.

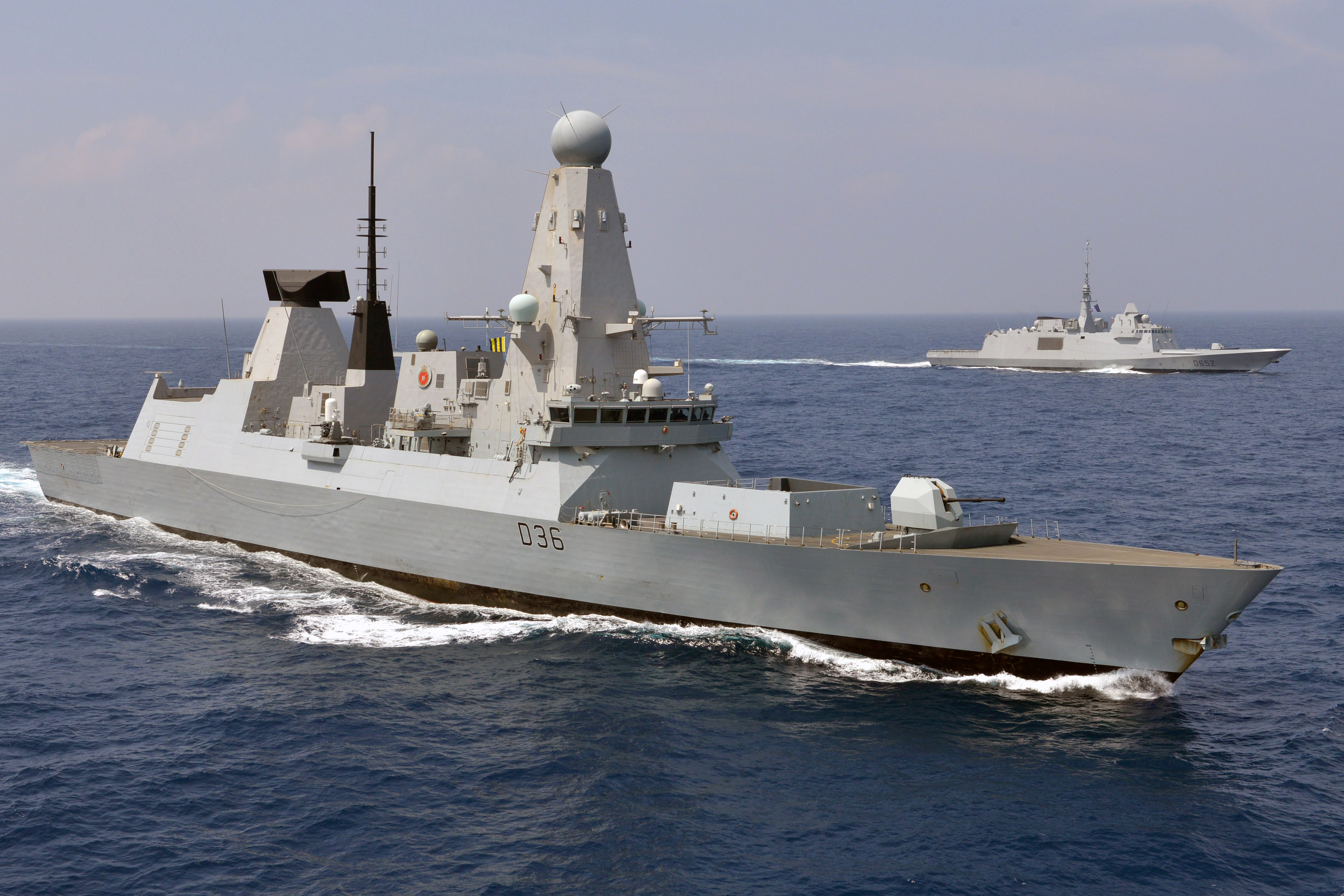
HMS Defender alongside Provence on 1 February 2016.

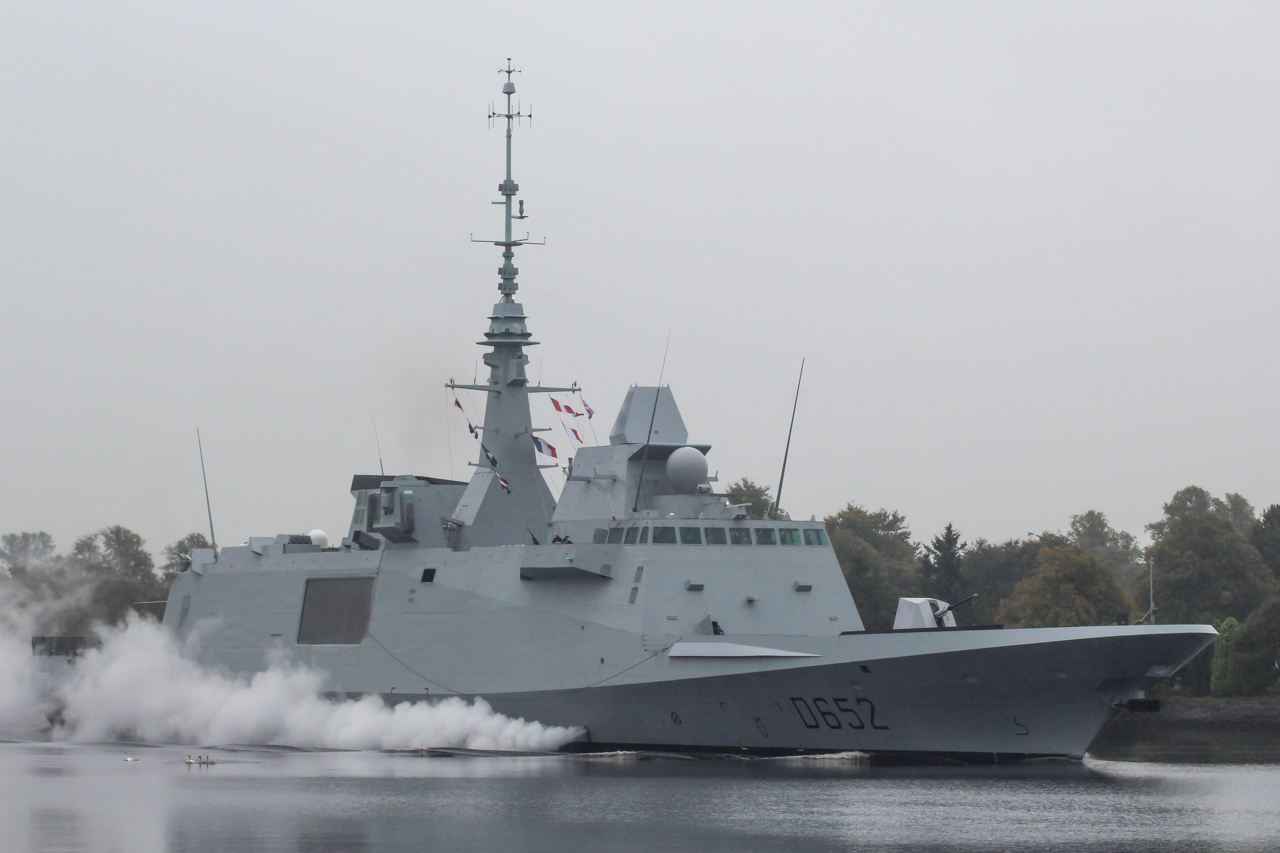
Provence leaving Glasgow on 1 October 2017.

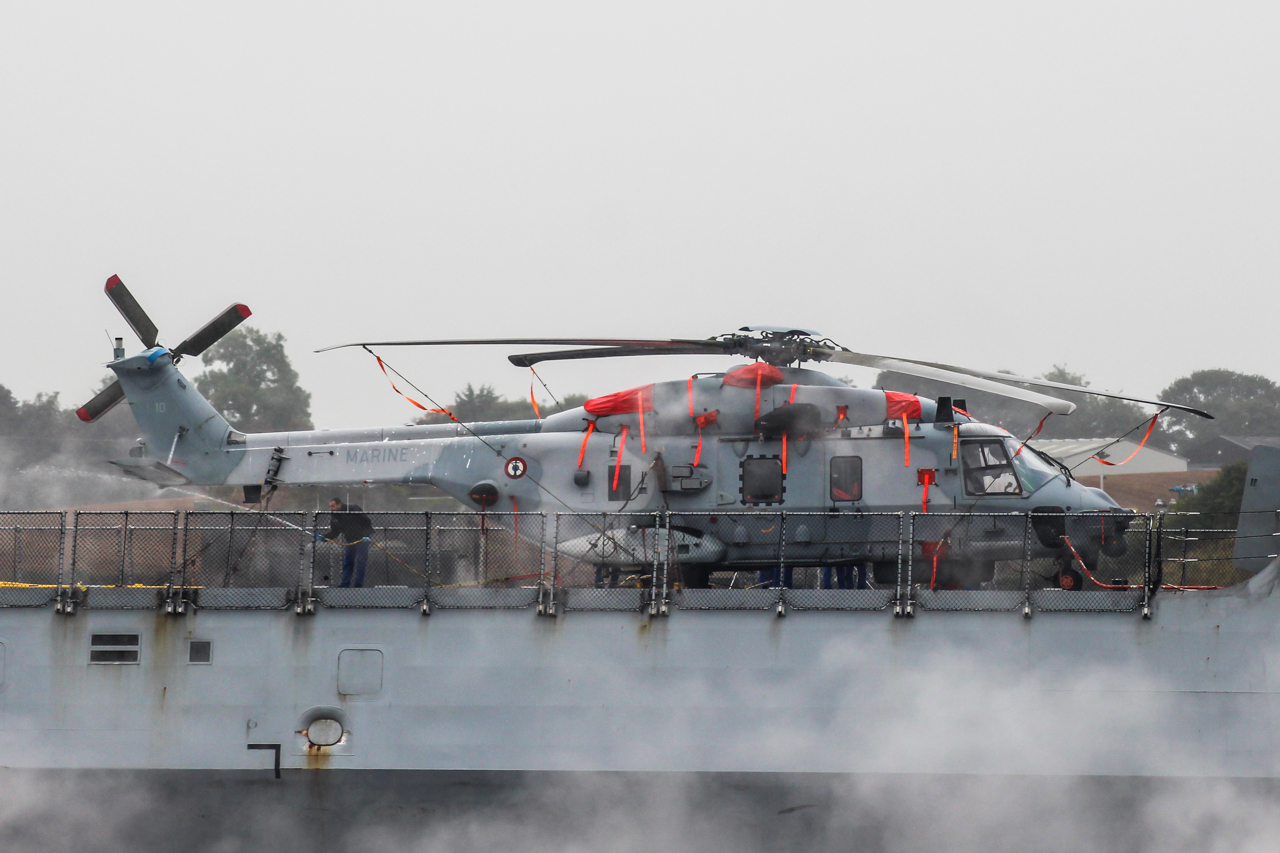
Provence leaving Glasgow on 1 October 2017.
