= Italian frigate Antonio Marceglia =

Italian Navy frigate

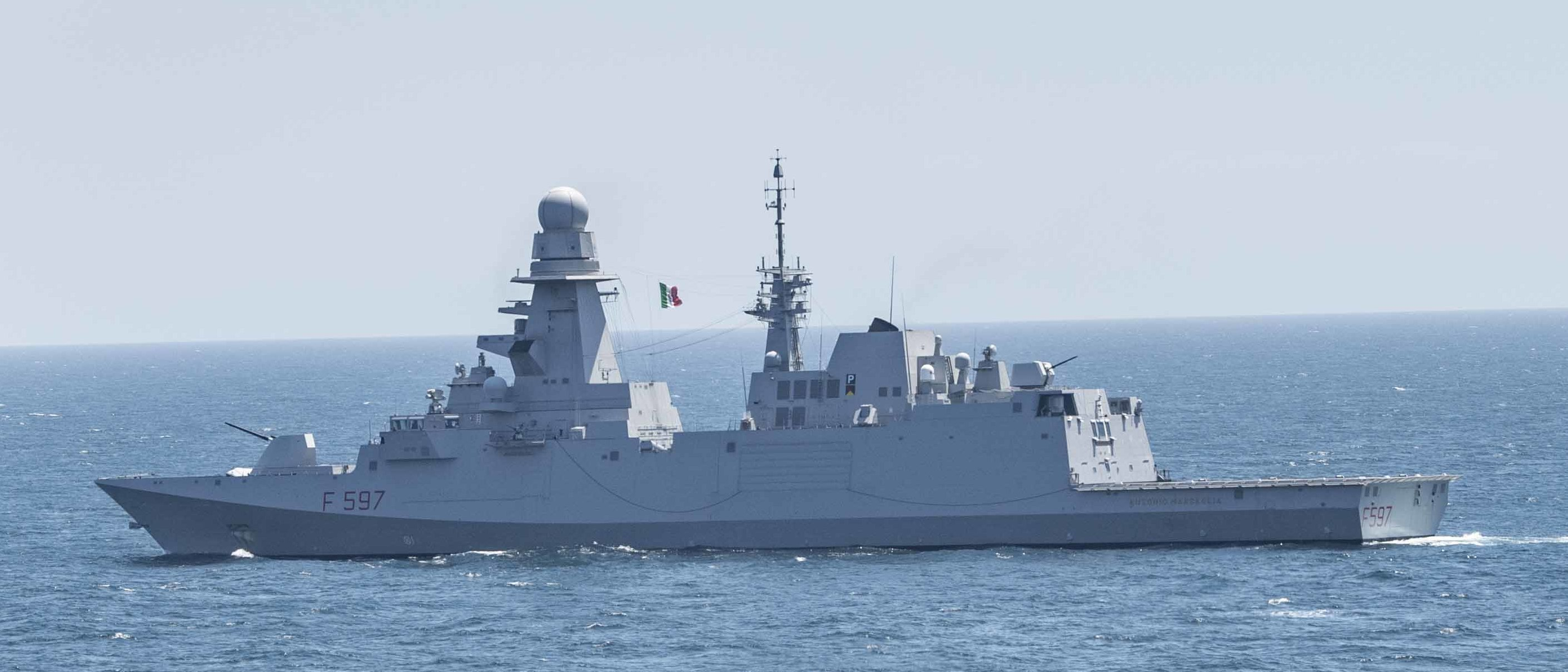
- Antonio Marceglia underway on 4 May 2021

History

Italy
- Name: Antonio Marceglia
- Namesake: Antonio Marceglia
- Builder: Fincantieri, Riva Trigoso and Muggiano
- Laid down: 12 July 2015
- Launched: 3 February 2018
- Commissioned: 16 April 2019
- Home port: La Spezia
- Identification: Pennant number: F 597
- Status: Active

General characteristics
- Class & type: Carlo Bergamini-class frigate
- Displacement: 6,700 tons
- Length: 144.6 m (474.4 ft)
- Beam: 19.7 m (64.6 ft)
- Draught: 8.7 m (28.5 ft)
- Propulsion: CODLAG; 1 × 32 MW gas turbine General Electric/Avio LM2500+G4; 2 × 2.5 MW electric motors Jeumont Electric; 4 × diesel generators; VL 1716 (T2ME series by 2,15 MW everyone, on first two frigate; HPCR series by 2,8 MW everyone, since the third frigate); 2 × shafts, driving controllable pitch propellers; 1 × 1 MW bow thruster
- Speed: 27 knots (50 km/h; 31 mph); max cruise speed 15.6 knots (28.9 km/h; 18.0 mph)
- Range: 6,800 nmi (12,600 km; 7,800 mi) at 15 knots (28 km/h; 17 mph)
- Complement: 199
- Sensors & processing systems: Leonardo Kronos Grand Naval (MFRA) Active electronically scanned array radar; CAPTAS-4 towed-array sonar; UMS 4110 CL hull-mounted sonar
- Armament: 16-cell MBDA SYLVER A50 VLS for 16 MBDA Aster 15 and 30 missiles; 1 × Leonardo Otobreda 127/64 Vulcano; 1 × Leonardo OTO Melara 76/62 mm Davide/Strales CIWS gun; 2 × Leonardo Oto Melara/Oerlikon KBA 25/80 mm remote weapon systems; 8 × MBDA Teseo\Otomat Mk-2/A anti-ship and land attack missiles; 2 x triple Leonardo (WASS) B-515/3 launcher for MU 90 torpedoes; 2 x SITEP MASS CS-424 acoustic guns
- Aircraft carried: 2 × SH90; 1 × SH90; 1 × AW101 (armed with MU 90 torpedoes or MBDA Marte Mk2/S missiles)
- Aviation facilities: Double hangar

Antonio Marceglia (F 597) is a Carlo Bergamini-class frigate of the Italian Navy. Which in turn were developed by the FREMM multipurpose frigate program.

== Development and design ==
Planning assumptions for the Italian Navy are ten FREMM-IT comprising four anti-submarine warfare (ASW) variants and six general-purpose (GP) variants at €5.9 billion. The FREMM-IT will replace the Maestrale and Lupo-class frigates in service with the Italian Navy. In the 2013 Italian budget, the Italian government laid out the necessary financing for two more GP variants (FREMM-IT 7 & 8) and the contract was awarded in September 2013. On 15 April 2015, the Italian Parliament confirmed the deal between OCCAR and Orizzonte Sistemi Navali Spa (Fincantieri and Finmeccanica, since 2017 Leonardo) to begin building units 9 and 10, for 764 million Euros.

As of 16 April 2015, the Italian government has approved funding for all ten FREMM-IT to be delivered to the Italian Navy (four ASW variants and six GP variants).

FREMM-IT 9 & 10 will have undisclosed enhanced capabilities. All ten Italian FREMM-ITs have extended anti-air warfare (AAW) capabilities, with SAAM-ESD CMS, Aster 30, and Aster 15 missiles for extended area defence. SAAM-ESD CMS uses Leonardo MFRA, a 3D active radar (AESA), an evolved version of the Leonardo EMPAR PESA radar (previously embarked on Horizon-class destroyers and the aircraft carrier Cavour). Since the 7th FREMM-IT, there will be updates, such as a new conformal IFF antenna and much more stealth response. Since the 9th FREMM-IT, SCLAR-H replaced with Leonardo ODLS-20. In 2017 the Italian FREMM refit started with the installation of each of two SITEP MS-424 acoustic guns.

In 2020 it was reported that Italy would sell its last two FREMM-class frigates in the current production line (Spartaco Schergat and Emilio Bianchi) to Egypt. Spartaco Schergat was in the final stage of her sea trials while Emilio Bianchi would follow within one year. The deal reportedly also involved other military equipment and was worth 1.2 billion Euros. It was reported that Italy would then order two additional FREMM frigates to replace those transferred to Egypt with the anticipated delivery of the replacements by 2024.

== Construction and career ==
She was laid down on 12 July 2015 and her launching ceremony took place at the Fincantieri plants in Riva Trigoso. She was commissioned on 16 April 2019.

Antonio Marceglia successfully launched an Aster 30 Missile during Exercise Formidable Shield on 26 May 2021. On 9 June 2021, she participated in BALTOPS 2021.

On 5 February 2025, the Antonio Marceglia arrived at the Port of Colombo, Sri Lanka for an official visit. The vessel departed the island on 7 February 2025 after concluding its visit.

Between 26 May and 1 June 2025, Antonio Marceglia visited Mumbai Port while operating under EUNAVFOR Atalanta. The port visit was followed by a military exercise with the Indian Navy.
