= List of active French Navy ships =

Naval ensign of France

This is a list of active French Navy ships. The French Navy consists of 168 active ships out of which nearly 100 vessels of the Force d'action navale (Naval action force) and the 9 active submarines of the Forces sous-marines (Submarine force). Of these 168 ships, 29 could be considered "major" warships (9 submarines, 1 aircraft carrier, 3 amphibious ships, 16 destroyers/frigates). Primary assets include one nuclear aircraft carrier, 3 amphibious assault ships, 14 surface combatants of the "first rank": 2 Horizon-class destroyers, 8 Aquitaine-class frigates, 1 Amiral Ronarc'h-class frigates, and 3 of the 5 La Fayette-class general-purpose frigates (which have been upgraded to incorporate enhanced capabilities over those possessed by their two sister ships). The navy also deploys around 15 offshore patrol vessels (including six vessels classed as "surveillance frigates"). The surveillance frigates/offshore patrol vessels are supplemented by additional coast guard/Maritime Gendarmerie vessels. The surveillance frigates and a significant number of the patrol vessels are based in France's overseas territories.

The submarine force consists of five active nuclear attack submarines and four nuclear ballistic missile submarines.

Integral to supporting the Force d'Action Navale at sea are the French Navy's 3 replenishment oilers, approximately 22 mine countermeasure vessels, 8 offshore patrol/support & assistance vessels (four of which are based in France's overseas territories) and 6 support/pollution response ships. In addition to the above units, the Navy operates five survey vessels, four experimentation ships, four ocean tugboats, 14 training vessels as well as numerous smaller vessels and tugs.

The main base for French naval forces in the Atlantic is located at Brest while the principal base in the Mediterranean is Toulon.

== Submarine fleet (Forces sous-marines) ==
=== Nuclear ballistic missile submarines (4) ===
Class	In service	Picture	Type	Builder	Disp. (metric)	Boat	No.	Comm.	Notes
Triomphant class	4		Ballistic missile submarine	DCN (Arsenal de Cherbourg shipyard)	14,200 tonnes	Le Triomphant	S616	21 Mar 1997	These submarines are the strategic component of France's nuclear deterrent, the Force de dissuasion.
Triomphant class	4		Ballistic missile submarine	DCN (Arsenal de Cherbourg shipyard)	14,200 tonnes	Le Téméraire	S617	23 Dec 1999	These submarines are the strategic component of France's nuclear deterrent, the Force de dissuasion.
Triomphant class	4		Ballistic missile submarine	DCN (Arsenal de Cherbourg shipyard)	14,200 tonnes	Le Vigilant	S618	26 Nov 2004	These submarines are the strategic component of France's nuclear deterrent, the Force de dissuasion.
Triomphant class	4		Ballistic missile submarine	DCN / DCNS (Arsenal de Cherbourg shipyard)	14,200 tonnes	Le Terrible	S619	20 Sep 2010	These submarines are the strategic component of France's nuclear deterrent, the Force de dissuasion.

=== Nuclear attack submarines (5) ===
Class	In service	Picture	Type	Builder	Disp. (metric)	Boat	No.	Comm.	Notes
Rubis class	1		Nuclear attack submarine	DCCAN (Arsenal de Cherbourg shipyard)	2,670 tonnes	Améthyste	S605	20 Mar 1992	Planned to be decommissioned by 2027.
Suffren class	4 (+2 to be delivered)		Nuclear attack submarine	Naval Group (Arsenal de Cherbourg shipyard)	5,100 tonnes (submerged)	Suffren	S635	3 Jun 2022	
Suffren class	4 (+2 to be delivered)		Nuclear attack submarine	Naval Group (Arsenal de Cherbourg shipyard)	5,100 tonnes (submerged)	Duguay-Trouin	S636	4 Apr 2024	
Suffren class	4 (+2 to be delivered)		Nuclear attack submarine	Naval Group (Arsenal de Cherbourg shipyard)	5,100 tonnes (submerged)	Tourville	S637	4 Jul 2025	
Suffren class	4 (+2 to be delivered)		Nuclear attack submarine	Naval Group (Arsenal de Cherbourg shipyard)	5,100 tonnes (submerged)	De Grasse	S638	20 Nov 2026	

== Surface fleet (Bâtiments de combat) ==
=== Aircraft carrier (1) ===
Class	In service	Picture	Type	Builder	Disp. (metric)	Boat	No.	Comm.	Notes
–	1		Aircraft carrier (CATOBAR)	DCCAN (Arsenal de Brest)	42,500 tonnes	Charles de Gaulle	R91	18 May 2001	

=== Amphibious warfare ===
==== Helicopter carriers (3) ====
Class	In service	Picture	Type	Builder	Disp. (metric)	Boat	No.	Comm.	Notes
Mistral class	3		LHD (PHA / BPC)	DCNS (design / combat system); STX Europe (Chantiers de l'Atlantique, Saint-Nazaire)	21,500 tonnes	Mistral	L9013	15 Dec 2006	
Mistral class	3		LHD (PHA / BPC)	DCNS (design / combat system); STX Europe (Chantiers de l'Atlantique, Saint-Nazaire)	21,500 tonnes	Tonnerre	L9014	1 Jul 2007	
Mistral class	3		LHD (PHA / BPC)	DCNS (design / combat system); STX Europe (Chantiers de l'Atlantique, Saint-Nazaire)	21,500 tonnes	Dixmude	L9015	27 Jul 2012	

==== Landing craft (12) ====
Class	In service	Picture	Type	Builder	Disp. (metric)	Boat	No.	Comm.	Notes
E-DAR class	4		Catamaran landing craft (RoRo)	CNIM (design); Socarenam (Saint-Malo shipyard)	200 tonnes (empty); 285 tonnes (at max load)	–	L9092	18 Apr 2013	
E-DAR class	4		Catamaran landing craft (RoRo)	CNIM (design); Socarenam (Saint-Malo shipyard)	200 tonnes (empty); 285 tonnes (at max load)	–	L9093	18 Apr 2013	
E-DAR class	4		Catamaran landing craft (RoRo)	CNIM (design); Socarenam (Saint-Malo shipyard)	200 tonnes (empty); 285 tonnes (at max load)	–	L9094	18 Apr 2013	
E-DAR class	4		Catamaran landing craft (RoRo)	CNIM (design); Socarenam (Saint-Malo shipyard)	200 tonnes (empty); 285 tonnes (at max load)	–	L9095	18 Apr 2013	
EDA-S class	8		Landing craft	CNIM (design); Socarenam (Saint-Malo shipyard)	120 tonnes (empty); 200 tonnes (at max load)	Arbalète	L9100	20 Jul 2022	Note: 6 additional EDA-S are used as auxiliary support ships, replacing logistics barges (overseas).
EDA-S class	8		Landing craft	CNIM (design); Socarenam (Saint-Malo shipyard)	120 tonnes (empty); 200 tonnes (at max load)	Arquebuse	L9101	20 Jul 2022	Note: 6 additional EDA-S are used as auxiliary support ships, replacing logistics barges (overseas).
EDA-S class	8		Landing craft	CNIM (design); Socarenam (Saint-Malo shipyard)	120 tonnes (empty); 200 tonnes (at max load)	Bombarde	L9102	4 Dec 2023	Note: 6 additional EDA-S are used as auxiliary support ships, replacing logistics barges (overseas).
EDA-S class	8		Landing craft	CNIM (design); Socarenam (Saint-Malo shipyard)	120 tonnes (empty); 200 tonnes (at max load)	Javeline	L9103	4 Dec 2023	Note: 6 additional EDA-S are used as auxiliary support ships, replacing logistics barges (overseas).
EDA-S class	8		Landing craft	CNIM (design); Socarenam (Saint-Malo shipyard)	120 tonnes (empty); 200 tonnes (at max load)	Pertuisane	L9104	2025	Note: 6 additional EDA-S are used as auxiliary support ships, replacing logistics barges (overseas).
EDA-S class	8		Landing craft	CNIM (design); Socarenam (Saint-Malo shipyard)	120 tonnes (empty); 200 tonnes (at max load)	Glaive	L9105	2025	Note: 6 additional EDA-S are used as auxiliary support ships, replacing logistics barges (overseas).
EDA-S class	8		Landing craft	CNIM (design); Socarenam (Saint-Malo shipyard)	120 tonnes (empty); 200 tonnes (at max load)	Rapière	L9112	15 Apr 2026	Note: 6 additional EDA-S are used as auxiliary support ships, replacing logistics barges (overseas).
EDA-S class	8		Landing craft	CNIM (design); Socarenam (Saint-Malo shipyard)	120 tonnes (empty); 200 tonnes (at max load)	Hallebarde	L9113	15 Apr 2026	Note: 6 additional EDA-S are used as auxiliary support ships, replacing logistics barges (overseas).

=== Major surface combatants (15) ===
The French Navy designates those vessels as frigates, although they might show hull numbers with the "D" for "destroyer" to remain coherent in the NATO ship designation. As of 2023, French Navy vessels are incrementally having hull numbers removed from display on all ships).

Class	In service	Picture	Type	Builder	Disp. (metric)	Boat	No.	Comm.	Notes
Air defence frigates
Horizon class	2		Air defence frigate	DCNS (Lorient shipyard)	7,000 tonnes	Forbin	D620	14 Oct 2010	
Horizon class	2		Air defence frigate	DCNS (Lorient shipyard)	7,000 tonnes	Chevalier Paul	D621	10 Jun 2011	
Acquitaine class (FREMM-DA)	2		Air defence frigate	Naval Group (Lorient shipyard)	6,000 tonnes	Alsace	D656	22 Nov 2021	
Acquitaine class (FREMM-DA)	2		Air defence frigate	Naval Group (Lorient shipyard)	6,000 tonnes	Lorraine	D657	13 Nov 2023	
Anti-submarine warfare frigates
Acquitaine class (FREMM-ASW)	6		Frigate ASW	DCNS / Naval Group (Lorient shipyard)	6,000 tonnes	Aquitaine	D650	2 Dec 2015	
Acquitaine class (FREMM-ASW)	6		Frigate ASW	DCNS / Naval Group (Lorient shipyard)	6,000 tonnes	Normandie	D651	2 Jun 2020	
Acquitaine class (FREMM-ASW)	6		Frigate ASW	DCNS / Naval Group (Lorient shipyard)	6,000 tonnes	Provence	D652	9 Jun 2016	
Acquitaine class (FREMM-ASW)	6		Frigate ASW	DCNS / Naval Group (Lorient shipyard)	6,000 tonnes	Languedoc	D653	4 Jul 2017	
Acquitaine class (FREMM-ASW)	6		Frigate ASW	DCNS / Naval Group (Lorient shipyard)	6,000 tonnes	Auvergne	D654	14 Feb 2018	
Acquitaine class (FREMM-ASW)	6		Frigate ASW	DCNS / Naval Group (Lorient shipyard)	6,000 tonnes	Bretagne	D655	20 Feb 2019	
Amiral Ronarc'h class	0 (+5 to be delivered)		Frigate ASW	Naval Group (Lorient shipyard)	4,500 tonnes	Amiral Ronarc'h	D660	Projected 2027	Delivered by the DGA to the Navy in October 2025 for a sea trial campaign, followed by some warranty work on the frigate before commissionning.
General-purpose frigates
La Fayette class	5		General-purpose frigate	DCN (Lorient shipyard)	3,800 tonnes	La Fayette	F710	22 Mar 1996	These 3 ships were upgraded with additional capabilities.
La Fayette class	5		General-purpose frigate	DCN (Lorient shipyard)	3,800 tonnes	Courbet	F712	1 Apr 1997	These 3 ships were upgraded with additional capabilities.
La Fayette class	5		General-purpose frigate	DCN (Lorient shipyard)	3,800 tonnes	Aconit	F713	3 Jun 1999	These 3 ships were upgraded with additional capabilities.
La Fayette class	5		General-purpose frigate	DCN (Lorient shipyard)	3,700 tonnes	Surcouf	F711	7 Feb 1997	
La Fayette class	5		General-purpose frigate	DCN (Lorient shipyard)	3,700 tonnes	Guépratte	F714	27 Oct 2001	

=== Offshore patrol vessels (14) ===
Class	In service	Picture	Type	Builder	Disp. (metric)	Boat	No.	Comm.	Notes
Floréal class	6		OPV (second rank "surveillance frigate")	Chantiers de l'Atlantique (Saint-Nazaire)	2,600 tonnes	Floréal	F730	27 May 1992	Based in Réunion.
Floréal class	6		OPV (second rank "surveillance frigate")	Chantiers de l'Atlantique (Saint-Nazaire)	2,600 tonnes	Prairial	F731	20 May 1992	Based in Papeete (French Polynesia).
Floréal class	6		OPV (second rank "surveillance frigate")	Chantiers de l'Atlantique (Saint-Nazaire)	2,600 tonnes	Nivôse	F732	16 Oct 1992	Based in Réunion.
Floréal class	6		OPV (second rank "surveillance frigate")	Chantiers de l'Atlantique (Saint-Nazaire)	2,600 tonnes	Ventôse	F733	5 May 1993	Based in Fort-de-France (Martinique).
Floréal class	6		OPV (second rank "surveillance frigate")	Chantiers de l'Atlantique (Saint-Nazaire)	2,600 tonnes	Vendémiaire	F734	21 Oct 1993	Based in Noumea (New Caledonia).
Floréal class	6		OPV (second rank "surveillance frigate")	Chantiers de l'Atlantique (Saint-Nazaire)	2,600 tonnes	Germinal	F735	17 May 1994	Based in Fort-de-France (Martinique).
D'Estienne d'Orves class (Aviso)	1		OPV (initially used as Aviso)	DTCN (Lorient shipyard)	1,250 tonnes	Commandant Blaison	F793	Oct 1982	Based in Brest. To be retired in 2027, and to be replaced by the Patrouilleurs Hauturiers class.
Confiance class (PAG)	3		High sea patrol vessel	Socarenam	750 tonnes	La Confiance	P733	27 Apr 2017	Based in Dégrad des Cannes (French Guiana).
Confiance class (PAG)	3		High sea patrol vessel	Socarenam	750 tonnes	La Résolue	P734	28 Sep 2017	Based in Dégrad des Cannes (French Guiana).
Confiance class (PAG)	3		High sea patrol vessel	Socarenam	750 tonnes	La Combattante	P735	23 Jan 2020	Based in Fort-de-France (Martinique).
Félix Éboué class (POM)	4 (+2 to be delivered)		High sea patrol vessel	Socarenam (Saint-Malo shipyard)	1,300 tonnes	Auguste Bénébig	P779	25 Jul 2023	Based in Noumea (New Caledonia).
Félix Éboué class (POM)	4 (+2 to be delivered)		High sea patrol vessel	Socarenam (Saint-Malo shipyard)	1,300 tonnes	Teriieroo a Teriierooiterai	P780	18 Jul 2024	Based in Papeete (French Polynesia).
Félix Éboué class (POM)	4 (+2 to be delivered)		High sea patrol vessel	Socarenam (Saint-Malo shipyard)	1,300 tonnes	Auguste Techer	P781	17 Oct 2025	Based in Réunion.
Félix Éboué class (POM)	4 (+2 to be delivered)		High sea patrol vessel	Socarenam (Saint-Malo shipyard)	1,300 tonnes	Jean Tranape	P782	14 Sep 2026	Based in Noumea (New Caledonia).
Félix Éboué class (POM)	4 (+2 to be delivered)		High sea patrol vessel	Socarenam (Saint-Malo shipyard)	1,300 tonnes	Philippe Bernardino	P783	Projected 2027	To be based in Papeete (French Polynesia); sea trials as of November 2026.
Félix Éboué class (POM)	4 (+2 to be delivered)		High sea patrol vessel	Socarenam (Saint-Malo shipyard)	1,300 tonnes	Félix Éboué	P784	Projected 2027	To be based in Réunion; fitting out as of November 2026.

=== Large coastal patrol boats (8) ===
Class	In service	Picture	Type	Disp. (metric)	Builder	Boat	No.	Comm	Notes
Flamant class (PSP / OPV54)	3		Patrol vessel	390 tonnes	CMN (Cherbourg shipyard)	Flamant	P676	18 Dec 1997	Extended to serve until the mid 2030s from Cherbourg. To be eventually replaced by the future PH class.
Flamant class (PSP / OPV54)	3		Patrol vessel	390 tonnes	CMN (Cherbourg shipyard)	Cormoran	P677	29 Oct 1997	Extended to serve until the mid 2030s from Cherbourg. To be eventually replaced by the future PH class.
Flamant class (PSP / OPV54)	3		Patrol vessel	390 tonnes	CMN (Cherbourg shipyard)	Pluvier	P678	18 Dec 1997	Extended to serve until the mid 2030s from Cherbourg. To be eventually replaced by the future PH class.
PCG-NG class	1		Patrol vessel	350 tonnes	Socarenam (Boulogne-sur-Mer shipyard)	Beuzeval	P728	– (officially still ongoing sea trials)	Intended for the Gendarmerie maritime, but operated by the Navy until the arrival of the PH class.
Lapérouse class	1		Patrol vessel	970 tonnes	DCCAN (Lorient shipyard)	Arago	P675	9 Jul 1991	Former hydrographic survey vessel, that was transitioned to Brest in 2024 to become a stop-gap patrol vessel in after a maintenance period, until the arrival of the PH class.
–	1		Coastal patrol vessel	550 tonnes	Socarenam (Boulogne-sur-Mer shipyard)	Fulmar	P740	2009 (with the Navy); 1991 (trawler)	Former trawler based in Saint Pierre and Miquelon to perform EEZ surveillance missions.
–	1		Coastal patrol vessel	1,100 tonnes	Westcon Yards AS (Ølensvåg shipyard, Norway)	Le Malin	P701	7 Jun 2011 (with the Navy); 1997 (trawler)	Former trawler based in Réunion; to be replaced in 2027 with the Félix Éboué (POM).
– (PP)	1		Polar patrol vessel / icebreaker / support vessel	4,300 tonnes	CRIST (Hull at Gdynia shipyard, Polandl); Piriou (outfitting)	L'Astrolabe	P800	11 Sep 2017	Based in Réunion. Ship operated by the French Navy and the TAAF administration in cooperation.

=== Mine countermeasures vessels (c. 22) ===
Class	In service	Picture	Type	Disp. (metric)	Builder	Boat	No.	Comm	Notes
Mine hunters
Éridan class (CMT)	8		Minehunter	615 tonnes	DTCN / DCN (Lorient shipyard)	Andromède	M643	18 Oct 1984	Class to be replaced by the BDGM and the SLAMF. Delays in the bidding will include civilian supply ships being used with the SLAM-F as an intermediary solution.
Éridan class (CMT)	8		Minehunter	615 tonnes	DTCN / DCN (Lorient shipyard)	Pégase	M644	30 May 1985	Class to be replaced by the BDGM and the SLAMF. Delays in the bidding will include civilian supply ships being used with the SLAM-F as an intermediary solution.
Éridan class (CMT)	8		Minehunter	615 tonnes	DTCN / DCN (Lorient shipyard)	Croix du Sud	M646	14 Nov 1986	Class to be replaced by the BDGM and the SLAMF. Delays in the bidding will include civilian supply ships being used with the SLAM-F as an intermediary solution.
Éridan class (CMT)	8		Minehunter	615 tonnes	DTCN / DCN (Lorient shipyard)	L'Aigle	M647	1 Jul 1987	Class to be replaced by the BDGM and the SLAMF. Delays in the bidding will include civilian supply ships being used with the SLAM-F as an intermediary solution.
Éridan class (CMT)	8		Minehunter	615 tonnes	DTCN / DCN (Lorient shipyard)	Lyre	M648	16 Dec 1987	Class to be replaced by the BDGM and the SLAMF. Delays in the bidding will include civilian supply ships being used with the SLAM-F as an intermediary solution.
Éridan class (CMT)	8		Minehunter	615 tonnes	DTCN / DCN (Lorient shipyard)	Sagittaire	M650	2 Apr 1996	Class to be replaced by the BDGM and the SLAMF. Delays in the bidding will include civilian supply ships being used with the SLAM-F as an intermediary solution.
Éridan class (CMT)	8		Minehunter	615 tonnes	Mercantile-Beliard (Anvers shipyard, Belgium)	Céphée (formerly Fuchsia with the Belgian Navy)	M652	1996 (French Navy); Oct 1988 (Belgian Navy)	Bought second hand from Belgium.
Éridan class (CMT)	8		Minehunter	615 tonnes	Mercantile-Beliard (Anvers shipyard, Belgium)	Capricorne (formerly Dianthus with the Belgian Navy)	M653	1997 (French Navy); 20 Feb 1988 (Belgian Navy)	Bought second hand from Belgium.
Antarès class (BRS)	2		Mine warfare, sonar towing vessel	250 tonnes (340 tonnes full load)	Socarenam (Boulogne-sur-Mer shipyard)	Altaïr	M771	9 Jul 1994	Planned to be eventually replaced by the SLAM-F.
Antarès class (BRS)	2		Mine warfare, sonar towing vessel	250 tonnes (340 tonnes full load)	Socarenam (Boulogne-sur-Mer shipyard)	Aldébaran	M772	10 Mar 1995	Planned to be eventually replaced by the SLAM-F.
MMCM programme
Thales MCM USV (USV, subsystem of the SLAM-F)	3		Mine countermeasure USV	10 tonnes	Couach shipyard / Thales	Canopus	–	Dec 2024	It is an element of the SLAM-F programme. The main role is to escort strategic ships and submarines out of French ports. It is also used in mine warfare and surveillance. Each system includes: 2 × USV (with TSAM sonar); 8 × A18-M AUV; Autonomous underwater vehicle; Remotely operated underwater vehicle; Un drone sous marin (AUV) équipé d'un sonar; Un véhicule sous-marin téléopéré (ROV) équipé d'explosifs
Thales MCM USV (USV, subsystem of the SLAM-F)	3		Mine countermeasure USV	10 tonnes	Couach shipyard / Thales	Rigel	–	21 Oct 2025	It is an element of the SLAM-F programme. The main role is to escort strategic ships and submarines out of French ports. It is also used in mine warfare and surveillance. Each system includes: 2 × USV (with TSAM sonar); 8 × A18-M AUV; Autonomous underwater vehicle; Remotely operated underwater vehicle; Un drone sous marin (AUV) équipé d'un sonar; Un véhicule sous-marin téléopéré (ROV) équipé d'explosifs
Thales MCM USV (USV, subsystem of the SLAM-F)	3		Mine countermeasure USV	10 tonnes	Couach shipyard / Thales	Sirius	–	30 Apr 2026	It is an element of the SLAM-F programme. The main role is to escort strategic ships and submarines out of French ports. It is also used in mine warfare and surveillance. Each system includes: 2 × USV (with TSAM sonar); 8 × A18-M AUV; Autonomous underwater vehicle; Remotely operated underwater vehicle; Un drone sous marin (AUV) équipé d'un sonar; Un véhicule sous-marin téléopéré (ROV) équipé d'explosifs
Exail A18-M (AUV NG, sussystem of the SLAM-F)	N/A	–	Mine countermeasure AUV	–	Exail Tech (Ostend factory)	–	–	–	Drone equipped with a Thales SAMDIS 600 synthetic aperture sonar. First vessel of the class rented in 2022.
MuMNS (ROV NG, subsystem of the SLAM-F)	N/A		Mine neutralisation system ROV	–	Saab (Linköping factory)	–	–	–	System ordered at the end of 2020.
Diving support vessels to mine warfare
Vulcain class (BBPD)	4		Clearance diving base ship	490 tonnes	CMN (Cherbourg shipyard); Chantiers et ateliers de la Perrière (Lorient shipyard)	Vulcain	M611	11 Oct 1986	A procedure is ongoing to find a successor to this class of ships.
Vulcain class (BBPD)	4		Clearance diving base ship	490 tonnes	CMN (Cherbourg shipyard); Chantiers et ateliers de la Perrière (Lorient shipyard)	Pluton	M622	12 Dec 1986	A procedure is ongoing to find a successor to this class of ships.
Vulcain class (BBPD)	4		Clearance diving base ship	490 tonnes	CMN (Cherbourg shipyard); Chantiers et ateliers de la Perrière (Lorient shipyard)	Achéron	A613	21 Apr 1987	A procedure is ongoing to find a successor to this class of ships.
Vulcain class (BBPD)	4		Clearance diving base ship	490 tonnes	CMN (Cherbourg shipyard); Chantiers et ateliers de la Perrière (Lorient shipyard)	Styx	M614	22 Jul 1987	A procedure is ongoing to find a successor to this class of ships.
Ophrys class (VSP)	5 (+3 to be delivered)		Clearance diving support boat	87 tonnes (102 tonnes full load)	BMA (Merré shipyard, Nort sur Erdre / CIB shipyard, Brest)	Ophrys	Y6040	a	It is an element of the SLAM-F programme, and it succeeded to the VIPD.
Ophrys class (VSP)	5 (+3 to be delivered)		Clearance diving support boat	87 tonnes (102 tonnes full load)	BMA (Merré shipyard, Nort sur Erdre / CIB shipyard, Brest)	Acacia	Y6041	10 Mar 2025	It is an element of the SLAM-F programme, and it succeeded to the VIPD.
Ophrys class (VSP)	5 (+3 to be delivered)		Clearance diving support boat	87 tonnes (102 tonnes full load)	BMA (Merré shipyard, Nort sur Erdre / CIB shipyard, Brest)	Iris	Y6042	Jul 2025	It is an element of the SLAM-F programme, and it succeeded to the VIPD.
Ophrys class (VSP)	5 (+3 to be delivered)		Clearance diving support boat	87 tonnes (102 tonnes full load)	BMA (Merré shipyard, Nort sur Erdre / CIB shipyard, Brest)	Yucca	Y6043	28 Jan 2026	It is an element of the SLAM-F programme, and it succeeded to the VIPD.
Ophrys class (VSP)	5 (+3 to be delivered)		Clearance diving support boat	87 tonnes (102 tonnes full load)	BMA (Merré shipyard, Nort sur Erdre / CIB shipyard, Brest)	Pétunia	Y6044	22 May 2026	It is an element of the SLAM-F programme, and it succeeded to the VIPD.
Ophrys class (VSP)	5 (+3 to be delivered)		Clearance diving support boat	87 tonnes (102 tonnes full load)	BMA (Merré shipyard, Nort sur Erdre / CIB shipyard, Brest)	Azalea	Y6045	Projected 2026	It is an element of the SLAM-F programme, and it succeeded to the VIPD.
Ophrys class (VSP)	5 (+3 to be delivered)		Clearance diving support boat	87 tonnes (102 tonnes full load)	BMA (Merré shipyard, Nort sur Erdre / CIB shipyard, Brest)	Zinnia	Y6046	Projected 2027	It is an element of the SLAM-F programme, and it succeeded to the VIPD.
Ophrys class (VSP)	5 (+3 to be delivered)		Clearance diving support boat	87 tonnes (102 tonnes full load)	BMA (Merré shipyard, Nort sur Erdre / CIB shipyard, Brest)	Hysope	Y6047	Projected 2027	It is an element of the SLAM-F programme, and it succeeded to the VIPD.

== Auxiliary fleet ==
=== Replenishment ships (3) ===
Class	In service	Picture	Type	Disp. (metric)	Builder	Boat	No.	Comm	Notes
Jacques Chevallier class (BRF)	2 (+1 on order)		Replenishment oiler	31,000 tonnes (full load)	Naval Group / Chantiers de l'Atlantique (Saint-Nazaire shipyard); Fincantieri (partial hull construction)	Jacques Chevallier	A725	20 Nov 2024	A727 fitting out as of November 2026; fourth ship of the class planned for delivery in 2032.
Jacques Chevallier class (BRF)	2 (+1 on order)		Replenishment oiler	31,000 tonnes (full load)	Naval Group / Chantiers de l'Atlantique (Saint-Nazaire shipyard); Fincantieri (partial hull construction)	Jacques Stosskopf	A726	18 May 2026	A727 fitting out as of November 2026; fourth ship of the class planned for delivery in 2032.
Jacques Chevallier class (BRF)	2 (+1 on order)		Replenishment oiler	31,000 tonnes (full load)	Naval Group / Chantiers de l'Atlantique (Saint-Nazaire shipyard); Fincantieri (partial hull construction)	Émile Bertin	A727	Projected 2027	A727 fitting out as of November 2026; fourth ship of the class planned for delivery in 2032.
Durance class (BCR)	1		Replenishment oiler / command ship	18,000 tonnes (full load)	DCN (Arsenal de Brest shipyard)	Somme	A631	30 Aug 1990	Being replaced with the Jacques Chevallier class (2028 retirement planned).

=== Intelligence, research and experimentation vessels (4) ===
Class	In service	Picture	Type	Disp. (metric)	Builder	Boat	No.	Comm	Notes
– (BEM)	1		Tracking ship (Missiles and rockets tracking)	21,400 tonnes	Chantiers de l'Atlantique (Saint-Nazaire shipyard)	Monge	A601	4 Nov 1992	
– (BRE)	1		SIGINT ship	3,100 tonnes (3,600 tonnes full load)	Royal Niestern Sander (Delfzijl shipyard, Netherlands)	Dupuy de Lôme	A759	1 Jul 2006	
– (BSP)	1	–	Diving support ship	1,600 tonnes	Socarenam (Boulogne-sur-Mer shipyard)	Alizé	A645	8 Nov 2005	Used by the DGSE as a spy vessel. Also used to test new equipment and diving procedures.
Lapérouse class (BEGM)	1		Mine warfare experimentation vessel	900 tonnes (1,050 tonnes full load)	DCCAN (Lorient shipyard)	Thétis	A785	9 Nov 1988	

=== Support ships (15 + 2 leased) ===
Class	In service	Picture	Type	Disp. (metric)	Builder	Boat	No.	Comm	Notes
EEZ patrol vessels
D'Entrecasteaux class (BSAOM)	4		EEZ patrol vessel / support and assistance vessel	2,300 tonnes	Kership (Concarneau shipyard)	D'Entrecasteaux	A621	31 Aug 2016	Based in Noumea (New Caledonia).
D'Entrecasteaux class (BSAOM)	4		EEZ patrol vessel / support and assistance vessel	2,300 tonnes	Kership (Concarneau shipyard)	Bougainville	A622	16 Dec 2016	Based in Papeete (French Polynesia).
D'Entrecasteaux class (BSAOM)	4		EEZ patrol vessel / support and assistance vessel	2,300 tonnes	Kership (Concarneau shipyard)	Champlain	A623	4 Jul 2017	Based in Réunion.
D'Entrecasteaux class (BSAOM)	4		EEZ patrol vessel / support and assistance vessel	2,300 tonnes	Kership (Concarneau shipyard)	Dumont d'Urville	A624	17 Apr 2020	Based in Fort-de-France (Martinique).
Loire class (BSAM)	4		EEZ patrol vessel / support and assistance vessel	2,950 tonnes	Kership (Concarneau shipyard)	Loire	A602	26 Jul 2018	It has a mine-laying capability.
Loire class (BSAM)	4		EEZ patrol vessel / support and assistance vessel	2,950 tonnes	Kership (Concarneau shipyard)	Rhône	A603	22 Jan 2019	It has a mine-laying capability.
Loire class (BSAM)	4		EEZ patrol vessel / support and assistance vessel	2,950 tonnes	Kership (Concarneau shipyard)	Seine	A604	24 Jul 2019	It has a mine-laying capability.
Loire class (BSAM)	4		EEZ patrol vessel / support and assistance vessel	2,950 tonnes	Kership (Concarneau shipyard)	Garonne	A605	8 Jan 2020	It has a mine-laying capability.
– (ERF)	1		Net-retrieving vessel	80 tonnes	Chantier Naval Glehen (Douarnenez shipyard)	Caouanne	Y690	16 Oct 2015	
Transport vessels
CTS class	1		Transport vessel / landing boat	1,100 tonnes	Serra Freres (Seyne-Sur-Mer / Toulon shipyard)	Gapeau	L9090	7 Dec 1987	Connection between the continent and Levant Island for the DGA (testing site).
Chaland de transport de matériel class	3		Landing craft	150 tonnes	CMN (Cherbourg shipyard)	–	CTM 13	1983	Based in Mayotte.
Chaland de transport de matériel class	3		Landing craft	150 tonnes	CMN (Cherbourg shipyard)	–	CTM 29	1986	Based in Djibouti.
Chaland de transport de matériel class	3		Landing craft	150 tonnes	CMN (Cherbourg shipyard)	–	CTM XX	1986	Based in Djibouti.
EDA-S class	2 (+4 to be delivered)		Landing craft	120 tonnes (empty); 200 tonnes (at max load)	CNIM (design); Socarenam (Saint-Malo shipyard)	Sabre	L9109	22 Jan 2025	Based in Noumea (New Caledonia).
EDA-S class	2 (+4 to be delivered)		Landing craft	120 tonnes (empty); 200 tonnes (at max load)	CNIM (design); Socarenam (Saint-Malo shipyard)	Anne-Marie II	L9111	2025	Based in Dégrad des Cannes (French Guiana).
EDA-S class	2 (+4 to be delivered)		Landing craft	120 tonnes (empty); 200 tonnes (at max load)	CNIM (design); Socarenam (Saint-Malo shipyard)	Dague	L9106	Projected 2028	To be based in Djibouti. Note: 8 EDA-S are used as landing crafts for amphibious operations.
EDA-S class	2 (+4 to be delivered)		Landing craft	120 tonnes (empty); 200 tonnes (at max load)	CNIM (design); Socarenam (Saint-Malo shipyard)	Mousquet	L9107	Projected 2028	To be based in Djibouti. Note: 8 EDA-S are used as landing crafts for amphibious operations.
EDA-S class	2 (+4 to be delivered)		Landing craft	120 tonnes (empty); 200 tonnes (at max load)	CNIM (design); Socarenam (Saint-Malo shipyard)	Épée	L9108	Projected 2029	To be based in Mayotte.
EDA-S class	2 (+4 to be delivered)		Landing craft	120 tonnes (empty); 200 tonnes (at max load)	CNIM (design); Socarenam (Saint-Malo shipyard)	Coutelas	L9110	Projected 2029	To be based in Fort-de-France (Martinique).
Chartered vessels
– (BSAD)	1		Support / offshore towing / pollution control vessel	2,310 tonnes	Keppel Singmarine (Singapore shipyard)	Jason	–	2009 (with the Navy); 2005 (offshore tugboat)	Leased from Bourbon.
Ulstein UT 710 (BSAD)	1		Support / offshore towing / pollution control vessel	2,100 tonnes	Vard Tulcea (Tulcea shipyard, Romania); STX Norway (design)	Argonaute	–	10 Jan 2004	Leased from Bourbon.
Ulstein UT 728L (BSAA)	1	–	Support / offshore towing / pollution control vessel	2,195 tonnes	Orskov Yard (Frederikshavn shipyard, Denmark); STX Norway (design)	Pionnier	–	Jan 2020 (with the Navy); 2002 (offshore tugboat)	Leased from SeaOwl.

=== Survey vessels (5) ===
Class	In service	Picture	Type	Disp. (metric)	Builder	Boat	No.	Comm	Notes
– (BHO)	1		Oceanographic survey ship	3,300 tonnes	Chantiers de l'Atlantique (Saint-Nazaire shipyard)	Beautemps-Beaupré	A758	13 Dec 2003	
Lapérouse class (BH)	3		Hydrographic survey ship	980 tonnes	DCCAN (Lorient shipyard)	Lapérouse	A791	20 Apr 1988	Planned to be replaced with 2 new hydro-oceanographic vessels (CHOF programme).
Lapérouse class (BH)	3		Hydrographic survey ship	980 tonnes	DCCAN (Lorient shipyard)	Borda	A792	16 Jun 1988	Planned to be replaced with 2 new hydro-oceanographic vessels (CHOF programme).
Lapérouse class (BH)	3		Hydrographic survey ship	980 tonnes	DCCAN (Lorient shipyard)	Laplace	A793	20 Apr 1988	Planned to be replaced with 2 new hydro-oceanographic vessels (CHOF programme).
–	1		Oceanographic research vessel	6,600 tonnes	Alstom Marine (Saint-Nazaire shipyard)	Pourquoi Pas?	–	2005	Co-owned by the French Navy and IFREMER. The crew is civilian. The ships is primarily operated for the SHOM.

=== Ocean tugboats (4 leased) ===
Class	In service	Picture	Type	Disp. (metric)	Builder	Boat	No.	Comm	Notes
Ulstein UT 515	2		Oceangoing tug / emergency tow vessel	4,600 tonnes	Myklebust Verft (Gurske shipyard, Norway); STX Norway (design)	Abeille Liberté	–	24 Oct 2005	Chartered / leased vessels from Les Abeilles International.
Ulstein UT 515	2		Oceangoing tug / emergency tow vessel	4,600 tonnes	Myklebust Verft (Gurske shipyard, Norway); STX Norway (design)	VB Abeille Bretagne	–	13 Apr 2005 a	Chartered / leased vessels from Les Abeilles International.
VS-491 CD	2		Oceangoing tug / emergency tow vessel	3,978 tonnes	Werft Kleven Verft (Ulsteinvik shipyard, Norway); Vik-Sandvik (design)	Abeille Normandie	–	23 Jun 2022 (with the Navy); 1995 (oil rig resupply ship)	Chartered / leased vessels from Les Abeilles International.
VS-491 CD	2		Oceangoing tug / emergency tow vessel	3,978 tonnes	Werft Kleven Verft (Ulsteinvik shipyard, Norway); Vik-Sandvik (design)	Abeille Méditerranée	–	7 Jun 2022 (with the Navy); 1995 (oil rig resupply ship)	Chartered / leased vessels from Les Abeilles International.

=== Port and coastal tugboats (53) ===
Class	In service	Picture	Type	Disp. (metric)	Builder	Boat	No.	Comm	Notes
RP30 class	4		Harbour tugboat	275 tonnes	Piriou (Concarneau shipyard)	Céladon	Y6051	26 May 2023	4 out of 20 planned were produced. But in October 2026, the French Navy ordered 16 RP30NG.
RP30 class	4		Harbour tugboat	275 tonnes	Piriou (Concarneau shipyard)	Zinzolin	A6652	2023	4 out of 20 planned were produced. But in October 2026, the French Navy ordered 16 RP30NG.
RP30 class	4		Harbour tugboat	275 tonnes	Piriou (Concarneau shipyard)	Turquin	Y6052	2023	4 out of 20 planned were produced. But in October 2026, the French Navy ordered 16 RP30NG.
RP30 class	4		Harbour tugboat	275 tonnes	Piriou (Concarneau shipyard)	Azur	Y6053	9 Nov 2023	4 out of 20 planned were produced. But in October 2026, the French Navy ordered 16 RP30NG.
– (RPC)	2		Harbour and coastal tugboat / (pollution control and firefighting secondary roles)	228 tonnes	Chantiers Navals du Nord Vanpraet (Villeneuve-la-Garenne shipyard)	Maïto	A636	Jul 1984	Based in Fort-de-France (Martinique).
– (RPC)	2		Harbour and coastal tugboat / (pollution control and firefighting secondary roles)	228 tonnes	Chantiers Navals du Nord Vanpraet (Villeneuve-la-Garenne shipyard)	Manini	A638	1985	Based in Papeete (French Polynesia).
RP12 class	17		Harbour and coastal tugboat	220 tonnes	Lorient Naval Industries	Fréhel	A675	23 May 1989	To be replaced with the Piriou RP30 NG.
RP12 class	17		Harbour and coastal tugboat	220 tonnes	Lorient Naval Industries	Saire	A676	6 Oct 1989	To be replaced with the Piriou RP30 NG.
RP12 class	17		Harbour and coastal tugboat	220 tonnes	Lorient Naval Industries	Armen	A677	6 Dec 1991	To be replaced with the Piriou RP30 NG.
RP12 class	17		Harbour and coastal tugboat	220 tonnes	Lorient Naval Industries	La Houssaye	A678	30 Oct 1992	To be replaced with the Piriou RP30 NG.
RP12 class	17		Harbour and coastal tugboat	220 tonnes	Lorient Naval Industries	Kéréon	A679	5 Dec 1992	To be replaced with the Piriou RP30 NG.
RP12 class	17		Harbour and coastal tugboat	220 tonnes	Lorient Naval Industries	Sicié	A680	6 Oct 1994	To be replaced with the Piriou RP30 NG.
RP12 class	17		Harbour and coastal tugboat	220 tonnes	Socarenam (Boulogne-sur-Mer shipyard)	Taunoa	A681	9 Mar 1996	To be replaced with the Piriou RP30 NG.
RP12 class	17		Harbour and coastal tugboat	220 tonnes	Socarenam (Boulogne-sur-Mer shipyard)	Lardier	Y638	12 Apr 1995	To be replaced with the Piriou RP30 NG.
RP12 class	17		Harbour and coastal tugboat	220 tonnes	Socarenam (Boulogne-sur-Mer shipyard)	Giens	Y639	2 Dec 1994	To be replaced with the Piriou RP30 NG.
RP12 class	17		Harbour and coastal tugboat	220 tonnes	Socarenam (Boulogne-sur-Mer shipyard)	Mengam	Y640	6 Oct 1994	To be replaced with the Piriou RP30 NG.
RP12 class	17		Harbour and coastal tugboat	220 tonnes	Socarenam (Boulogne-sur-Mer shipyard)	Balaguier	Y641	8 Jul 1995	To be replaced with the Piriou RP30 NG.
RP12 class	17		Harbour and coastal tugboat	220 tonnes	Socarenam (Boulogne-sur-Mer shipyard)	Taillat	Y642	18 Oct 1995	To be replaced with the Piriou RP30 NG.
RP12 class	17		Harbour and coastal tugboat	220 tonnes	Socarenam (Boulogne-sur-Mer shipyard)	Nividic	Y643	13 Dec 1996	To be replaced with the Piriou RP30 NG.
RP12 class	17		Harbour and coastal tugboat	220 tonnes	Socarenam (Boulogne-sur-Mer shipyard)	Port Cros	Y649	21 Jun 1997	To be replaced with the Piriou RP30 NG.
RP12 class	17		Harbour and coastal tugboat	220 tonnes	Socarenam (Boulogne-sur-Mer shipyard)	Le Four	Y647	13 Mar 1998	To be replaced with the Piriou RP30 NG.
RP12 class	17		Harbour and coastal tugboat	220 tonnes	Socarenam (Boulogne-sur-Mer shipyard)	Eckmühl	Y646	–	To be replaced with the Piriou RP30 NG.
RP12 class	17		Harbour and coastal tugboat	220 tonnes	Socarenam (Boulogne-sur-Mer shipyard)	Rascas	A682	22 Nov 2003	To be replaced with the Piriou RP30 NG.
RP10 class (SEEM 12-800ST design)	29		Harbour tugboat	96 tonnes	SEE Merré (Nort-sur-Erdre shipyard) / CIB (Brest shipyard) / CMN (Cherbourg shipyard)	L'Aigrette	Y6000	2019 to 2025	Orders: 7 × ordered in Dec 2016; 8 × ordered in 2020; 7 × ordered the 26 Jul 2021; 7 × ordered in summer 2022
RP10 class (SEEM 12-800ST design)	29		Harbour tugboat	96 tonnes	SEE Merré (Nort-sur-Erdre shipyard) / CIB (Brest shipyard) / CMN (Cherbourg shipyard)	Le Goéland	Y6001	2019 to 2025	Orders: 7 × ordered in Dec 2016; 8 × ordered in 2020; 7 × ordered the 26 Jul 2021; 7 × ordered in summer 2022
RP10 class (SEEM 12-800ST design)	29		Harbour tugboat	96 tonnes	SEE Merré (Nort-sur-Erdre shipyard) / CIB (Brest shipyard) / CMN (Cherbourg shipyard)	Le Puffin	Y6002	2019 to 2025	Orders: 7 × ordered in Dec 2016; 8 × ordered in 2020; 7 × ordered the 26 Jul 2021; 7 × ordered in summer 2022
RP10 class (SEEM 12-800ST design)	29		Harbour tugboat	96 tonnes	SEE Merré (Nort-sur-Erdre shipyard) / CIB (Brest shipyard) / CMN (Cherbourg shipyard)	Le Macareux	Y6003	2019 to 2025	Orders: 7 × ordered in Dec 2016; 8 × ordered in 2020; 7 × ordered the 26 Jul 2021; 7 × ordered in summer 2022
RP10 class (SEEM 12-800ST design)	29		Harbour tugboat	96 tonnes	SEE Merré (Nort-sur-Erdre shipyard) / CIB (Brest shipyard) / CMN (Cherbourg shipyard)	Le Gravelot	Y6004	2019 to 2025	Orders: 7 × ordered in Dec 2016; 8 × ordered in 2020; 7 × ordered the 26 Jul 2021; 7 × ordered in summer 2022
RP10 class (SEEM 12-800ST design)	29		Harbour tugboat	96 tonnes	SEE Merré (Nort-sur-Erdre shipyard) / CIB (Brest shipyard) / CMN (Cherbourg shipyard)	La Mouette	Y6005	2019 to 2025	Orders: 7 × ordered in Dec 2016; 8 × ordered in 2020; 7 × ordered the 26 Jul 2021; 7 × ordered in summer 2022
RP10 class (SEEM 12-800ST design)	29		Harbour tugboat	96 tonnes	SEE Merré (Nort-sur-Erdre shipyard) / CIB (Brest shipyard) / CMN (Cherbourg shipyard)	Le Vanneau	Y6006	2019 to 2025	Orders: 7 × ordered in Dec 2016; 8 × ordered in 2020; 7 × ordered the 26 Jul 2021; 7 × ordered in summer 2022
RP10 class (SEEM 12-800ST design)	29		Harbour tugboat	96 tonnes	SEE Merré (Nort-sur-Erdre shipyard) / CIB (Brest shipyard) / CMN (Cherbourg shipyard)	L'Océanite	Y6007	2019 to 2025	Orders: 7 × ordered in Dec 2016; 8 × ordered in 2020; 7 × ordered the 26 Jul 2021; 7 × ordered in summer 2022
RP10 class (SEEM 12-800ST design)	29		Harbour tugboat	96 tonnes	SEE Merré (Nort-sur-Erdre shipyard) / CIB (Brest shipyard) / CMN (Cherbourg shipyard)	Le Chevalier	Y6008	2019 to 2025	Orders: 7 × ordered in Dec 2016; 8 × ordered in 2020; 7 × ordered the 26 Jul 2021; 7 × ordered in summer 2022
RP10 class (SEEM 12-800ST design)	29		Harbour tugboat	96 tonnes	SEE Merré (Nort-sur-Erdre shipyard) / CIB (Brest shipyard) / CMN (Cherbourg shipyard)	Le Pingouin	Y6009	2019 to 2025	Orders: 7 × ordered in Dec 2016; 8 × ordered in 2020; 7 × ordered the 26 Jul 2021; 7 × ordered in summer 2022
RP10 class (SEEM 12-800ST design)	29		Harbour tugboat	96 tonnes	SEE Merré (Nort-sur-Erdre shipyard) / CIB (Brest shipyard) / CMN (Cherbourg shipyard)	Le Fou	Y6010	2019 to 2025	Orders: 7 × ordered in Dec 2016; 8 × ordered in 2020; 7 × ordered the 26 Jul 2021; 7 × ordered in summer 2022
RP10 class (SEEM 12-800ST design)	29		Harbour tugboat	96 tonnes	SEE Merré (Nort-sur-Erdre shipyard) / CIB (Brest shipyard) / CMN (Cherbourg shipyard)	La Gygis	Y6011	2019 to 2025	Orders: 7 × ordered in Dec 2016; 8 × ordered in 2020; 7 × ordered the 26 Jul 2021; 7 × ordered in summer 2022
RP10 class (SEEM 12-800ST design)	29		Harbour tugboat	96 tonnes	SEE Merré (Nort-sur-Erdre shipyard) / CIB (Brest shipyard) / CMN (Cherbourg shipyard)	Le Noddi	Y6012	2019 to 2025	Orders: 7 × ordered in Dec 2016; 8 × ordered in 2020; 7 × ordered the 26 Jul 2021; 7 × ordered in summer 2022
RP10 class (SEEM 12-800ST design)	29		Harbour tugboat	96 tonnes	SEE Merré (Nort-sur-Erdre shipyard) / CIB (Brest shipyard) / CMN (Cherbourg shipyard)	Le Pétrel	Y6013	2019 to 2025	Orders: 7 × ordered in Dec 2016; 8 × ordered in 2020; 7 × ordered the 26 Jul 2021; 7 × ordered in summer 2022
RP10 class (SEEM 12-800ST design)	29		Harbour tugboat	96 tonnes	SEE Merré (Nort-sur-Erdre shipyard) / CIB (Brest shipyard) / CMN (Cherbourg shipyard)	L'Albatros	Y6014	2019 to 2025	Orders: 7 × ordered in Dec 2016; 8 × ordered in 2020; 7 × ordered the 26 Jul 2021; 7 × ordered in summer 2022
RP10 class (SEEM 12-800ST design)	29		Harbour tugboat	96 tonnes	SEE Merré (Nort-sur-Erdre shipyard) / CIB (Brest shipyard) / CMN (Cherbourg shipyard)	La Guifette	Y6015	2019 to 2025	Orders: 7 × ordered in Dec 2016; 8 × ordered in 2020; 7 × ordered the 26 Jul 2021; 7 × ordered in summer 2022
RP10 class (SEEM 12-800ST design)	29		Harbour tugboat	96 tonnes	SEE Merré (Nort-sur-Erdre shipyard) / CIB (Brest shipyard) / CMN (Cherbourg shipyard)	Le Courlis	Y6016	2019 to 2025	Orders: 7 × ordered in Dec 2016; 8 × ordered in 2020; 7 × ordered the 26 Jul 2021; 7 × ordered in summer 2022
RP10 class (SEEM 12-800ST design)	29		Harbour tugboat	96 tonnes	SEE Merré (Nort-sur-Erdre shipyard) / CIB (Brest shipyard) / CMN (Cherbourg shipyard)	Le Pélican	Y6017	2019 to 2025	Orders: 7 × ordered in Dec 2016; 8 × ordered in 2020; 7 × ordered the 26 Jul 2021; 7 × ordered in summer 2022
RP10 class (SEEM 12-800ST design)	29		Harbour tugboat	96 tonnes	SEE Merré (Nort-sur-Erdre shipyard) / CIB (Brest shipyard) / CMN (Cherbourg shipyard)	L'Huitrier	Y6018	2019 to 2025	Orders: 7 × ordered in Dec 2016; 8 × ordered in 2020; 7 × ordered the 26 Jul 2021; 7 × ordered in summer 2022
RP10 class (SEEM 12-800ST design)	29		Harbour tugboat	96 tonnes	SEE Merré (Nort-sur-Erdre shipyard) / CIB (Brest shipyard) / CMN (Cherbourg shipyard)	La Sterne	Y6019	2019 to 2025	Orders: 7 × ordered in Dec 2016; 8 × ordered in 2020; 7 × ordered the 26 Jul 2021; 7 × ordered in summer 2022
RP10 class (SEEM 12-800ST design)	29		Harbour tugboat	96 tonnes	SEE Merré (Nort-sur-Erdre shipyard) / CIB (Brest shipyard) / CMN (Cherbourg shipyard)	L'Avocette	Y6020	2019 to 2025	Orders: 7 × ordered in Dec 2016; 8 × ordered in 2020; 7 × ordered the 26 Jul 2021; 7 × ordered in summer 2022
RP10 class (SEEM 12-800ST design)	29		Harbour tugboat	96 tonnes	SEE Merré (Nort-sur-Erdre shipyard) / CIB (Brest shipyard) / CMN (Cherbourg shipyard)	Le Guillemot	Y6021	2019 to 2025	Orders: 7 × ordered in Dec 2016; 8 × ordered in 2020; 7 × ordered the 26 Jul 2021; 7 × ordered in summer 2022
RP10 class (SEEM 12-800ST design)	29		Harbour tugboat	96 tonnes	SEE Merré (Nort-sur-Erdre shipyard) / CIB (Brest shipyard) / CMN (Cherbourg shipyard)	La Macreuse	Y6022	2019 to 2025	Orders: 7 × ordered in Dec 2016; 8 × ordered in 2020; 7 × ordered the 26 Jul 2021; 7 × ordered in summer 2022
RP10 class (SEEM 12-800ST design)	29		Harbour tugboat	96 tonnes	SEE Merré (Nort-sur-Erdre shipyard) / CIB (Brest shipyard) / CMN (Cherbourg shipyard)	Le Paille-en-Queue	Y6023	2019 to 2025	Orders: 7 × ordered in Dec 2016; 8 × ordered in 2020; 7 × ordered the 26 Jul 2021; 7 × ordered in summer 2022
RP10 class (SEEM 12-800ST design)	29		Harbour tugboat	96 tonnes	SEE Merré (Nort-sur-Erdre shipyard) / CIB (Brest shipyard) / CMN (Cherbourg shipyard)	Le Tournepierre	Y6024	2019 to 2025	Orders: 7 × ordered in Dec 2016; 8 × ordered in 2020; 7 × ordered the 26 Jul 2021; 7 × ordered in summer 2022
RP10 class (SEEM 12-800ST design)	29		Harbour tugboat	96 tonnes	SEE Merré (Nort-sur-Erdre shipyard) / CIB (Brest shipyard) / CMN (Cherbourg shipyard)	Le Bécasseau	Y6025	2019 to 2025	Orders: 7 × ordered in Dec 2016; 8 × ordered in 2020; 7 × ordered the 26 Jul 2021; 7 × ordered in summer 2022
RP10 class (SEEM 12-800ST design)	29		Harbour tugboat	96 tonnes	SEE Merré (Nort-sur-Erdre shipyard) / CIB (Brest shipyard) / CMN (Cherbourg shipyard)	La Barge	Y6026	2019 to 2025	Orders: 7 × ordered in Dec 2016; 8 × ordered in 2020; 7 × ordered the 26 Jul 2021; 7 × ordered in summer 2022
RP10 class (SEEM 12-800ST design)	29		Harbour tugboat	96 tonnes	SEE Merré (Nort-sur-Erdre shipyard) / CIB (Brest shipyard) / CMN (Cherbourg shipyard)	Le Labbe	Y6027	2019 to 2025	Orders: 7 × ordered in Dec 2016; 8 × ordered in 2020; 7 × ordered the 26 Jul 2021; 7 × ordered in summer 2022
RP10 class (SEEM 12-800ST design)	29		Harbour tugboat	96 tonnes	SEE Merré (Nort-sur-Erdre shipyard) / CIB (Brest shipyard) / CMN (Cherbourg shipyard)	Le Crabier	Y6028	2019 to 2025	Orders: 7 × ordered in Dec 2016; 8 × ordered in 2020; 7 × ordered the 26 Jul 2021; 7 × ordered in summer 2022

=== Training (12 + 2 leased) ===
Class	In service	Picture	Type	Disp. (metric)	Builder	Boat	No.	Comm	Notes
Léopard class (BE)	8		Training ship	479 tonnes	SICNAV (Saint-Malo shipyard)	Léopard	A748	4 Dec 1982	
Léopard class (BE)	8		Training ship	479 tonnes	SICNAV (Saint-Malo shipyard)	Panthère	A749	4 Dec 1982	
Léopard class (BE)	8		Training ship	479 tonnes	SICNAV (Saint-Malo shipyard)	Jaguar	A750	18 Dec 1982	
Léopard class (BE)	8		Training ship	479 tonnes	SICNAV (Saint-Malo shipyard)	Guépard	A752	1 Jul 1983	
Léopard class (BE)	8		Training ship	479 tonnes	SFCN (Villeneuve-la-Garenne shipyard)	Chacal	A753	10 Sep 1983	
Léopard class (BE)	8		Training ship	479 tonnes	La Ferrière (Lorient shipyard)	Lynx	A751	18 Dec 1982	
Léopard class (BE)	8		Training ship	479 tonnes	La Ferrière (Lorient shipyard)	Tigre	A754	1 Jul 1983	
Léopard class (BE)	8		Training ship	479 tonnes	La Ferrière (Lorient shipyard)	Lion	A755	10 Sep 1983	
Glycine class (BIN)	2		Navigation training ship	250 tonnes	Socarenam (Boulogne-sur-Mer shipyard)	Glycine	A770	11 Apr 1992	
Glycine class (BIN)	2		Navigation training ship	250 tonnes	Socarenam (Boulogne-sur-Mer shipyard)	Églantine	A771	9 Sep 1992	
–	2		Schooner (Goélette paimpolaise type) / navigation and sail training vessel	225 tonnes	Chantiers de Normandie (Fecamp shipyard)	Étoile	A649	1932	
–	2		Schooner (Goélette paimpolaise type) / navigation and sail training vessel	225 tonnes	Chantiers de Normandie (Fecamp shipyard)	Belle Poule	A650	1932	
Ulstein UT 712	1		Aggressor ship / helicopter landing training/ pollution control vessel	2,900 tonnes	Hatlø Verft (Ulsteinvik shipyard, Norway)	VN Rebel	–	2016 (with the Navy); 1984 (offshore tugboat)	Leased from SeaOwl.
Ulstein UT 745	1		Aggressor ship / helicopter landing training/ pollution control vessel	3,050 tonnes	Søviknes Verft AS (Søvik shipyard, Norway); STX Norway (design)	VN Partisan	–	2011 (with the Navy); 1995 (oil rig resupply ship)	Leased from SeaOwl. Used to train commandos, helicopter and maritime assaults.

For a complete list of Bâtiments de soutien (Auxiliaries) see Bâtiments de soutien at the official Marine Nationale website.

== Silhouettes ==
Silhouettes of major fleet units:

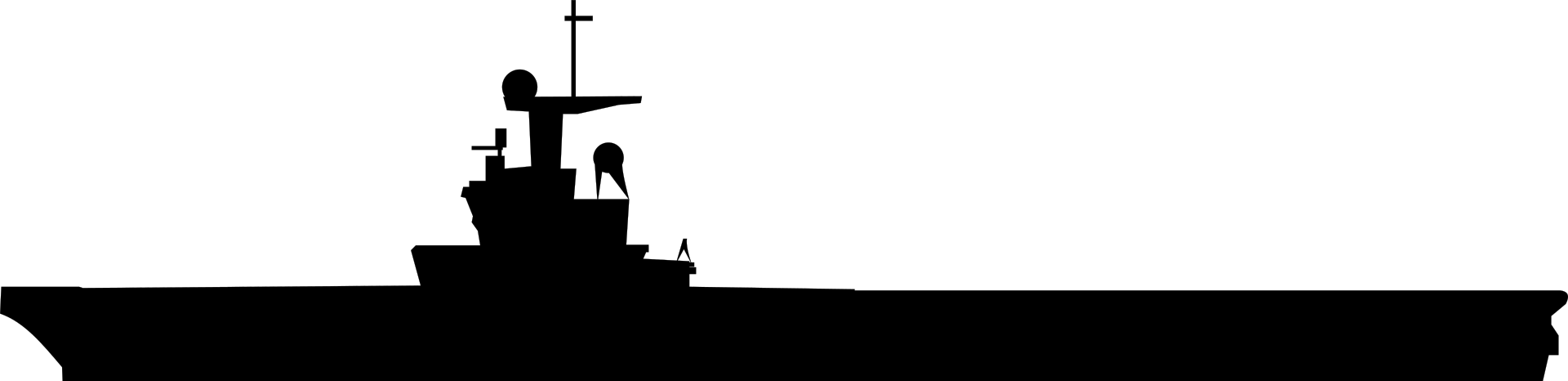
Charles de Gaulle

Mistral	Tonnerre	Dixmude

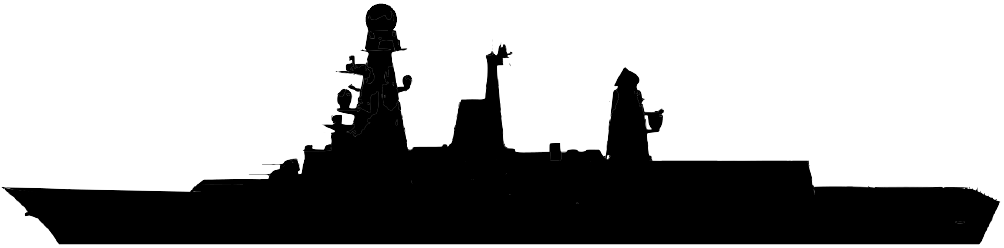
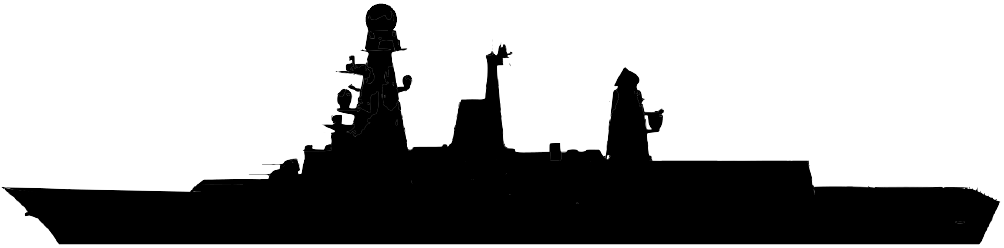
Forbin	Chevalier Paul

Aquitaine	Normandie	Provence	Languedoc

Auvergne	Bretagne	Alsace	Lorraine

Amiral Ronarc'h

La Fayette	Surcouf	Courbet	Aconit	Guépratte

Le Triomphant	Le Téméraire	Le Vigilant	Le Terrible

Suffren	Duguay-Trouin	Tourville	Améthyste

== See also ==
- Future of the French Navy
- Maritime Gendarmerie
- List of active French Navy landing craft
- List of ships of the line of France
- List of battleships of France
- List of French cruisers
- List of destroyers of France
- List of French sail frigates
- List of French steam frigates
