= French submarine Tourville =

French nuclear attack submarine

History

France
- Name: Tourville
- Namesake: Anne Hilarion de Costentin de Tourville
- Builder: Naval Group
- Laid down: 28 June 2011
- Launched: 12 July 2024
- Commissioned: 16 November 2024

General characteristics
- Class & type: Suffren-class submarine
- Displacement: 4,650 t surfaced; 5,300 t submerged
- Length: 99.5 m (326 ft 5 in)
- Beam: 8.8 m (28 ft 10 in)
- Draught: 7.3 m (23 ft 11 in)
- Propulsion: K15 nuclear reactor, 150 MW (200,000 hp); 2 x Turbo-generator groups: 10 MW (13,000 hp) each; 2 x emergency diesel generators 480 kW (640 hp) each; 1 x pump-jet electrically driven
- Speed: >25 kn (46 km/h; 29 mph), submerged; 14 kn (26 km/h; 16 mph), surfaced
- Range: Unlimited
- Endurance: 70 days of food
- Complement: 65 crew
- Armament: 4 × 533 mm (21.0 in) tubes; 20 storage racks, including; MdCN cruise missiles; Exocet SM39 anti-ship missiles; F21 Artemis heavy torpedoes; FG29 mines

Tourville (S637) is a French nuclear attack submarine (SNA). After the Suffren and Duguay-Trouin, it is the third of six Suffren-class submarines in the Barracuda program, the French Navy's second-generation nuclear attack submarine. Like several French naval ships before her, she is named after Vice-Admiral and Marshal of France Anne Hilarion de Costentin de Tourville.

Construction began on 28 June 2011, at Cherbourg. She first set sail in July 2024. A few weeks later, on 11 September, the Red crew of the new submarine was formed at a ceremony at Fort Saint-Louis, Toulon. Just over two weeks after her departure, Tourville returned to Cherbourg for a technical intervention to apply a few corrective measures. The submarine was delivered to the navy and entered active service on 16 November 2024. She was declared fully operational in July 2025.

== Service ==
One of her first missions was a visit to Canada in March 2025 to test cold water performance. It targeted a possible Canadian buy of French subs by its navy.
