= French ship Tourville =

Several ships of the French Navy have been named in honour of Anne Hilarion de Tourville. Among them:

- French ship Tourville (1788), a Téméraire-class 74-gun ship of the line (1790-1833)
- San Gennaro, a Spanish 86-gun ship of the line ceded to France, bore the name Tourville from 1811 to 1816
- French ship Tourville (1853), an 80-gun ship of the line (1853-1872)
- Tourville, an unprotected cruiser built in the 1870s
- Gironde, a transport renamed Tourville in 1909
- An unbuilt Lyon-class battleship (1914)
- Tourville, a heavy cruiser (1928-1962)
- Tourville, a F67 type frigate.
- Tourville, a Barracuda-class submarine.
