= French ship Laplace (A 793) =

1988 Lapérouse-class survey ship

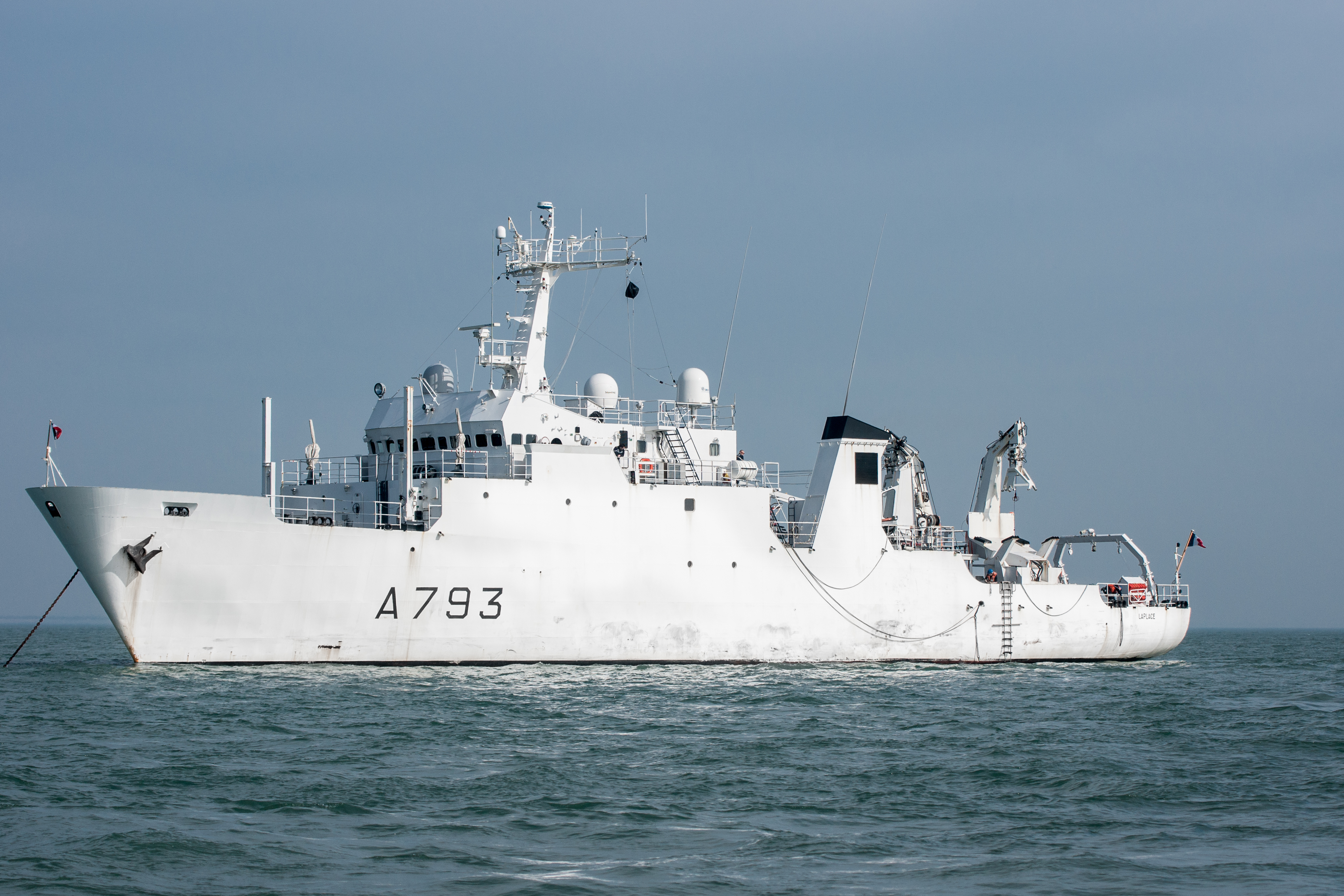
- French Ship Laplace

History

France
- Name: Laplace
- Namesake: Cyrille Pierre Théodore Laplace
- Laid down: 1 September 1987
- Launched: 9 November 1988
- Commissioned: 5 October 1989
- Identification: MMSI number: 228798000
- Status: in active service

General characteristics
- Class & type: Lapérouse-class survey ship
- Displacement: 850 t (837 long tons); 980 t (965 long tons) full load
- Length: 59 m (193 ft 7 in)
- Beam: 10.9 m (35 ft 9 in)
- Draught: 3.63 m (11 ft 11 in)
- Propulsion: 2 SACM Wärtsilä UD30 RVR V12 M6 diesel engines 2,500 hp (1,864 kW); 2 shafts with 4-blade controllable pitch propellers
- Range: 6,000 nmi (11,000 km) at 12 kn (14 mph; 22 km/h)
- Complement: 3 officers; 10 non-commissioned officers; 18 enlisted personnel; 11 hydrographers
- Armament: 2 × 12.7 mm machine guns

Laplace is a hydrographic survey ship of the French Navy, third of the Lapérouse-class survey ships.

== Career ==
In 1999, Laplace surveyed the Persian Gulf, retrieving samples from the sea floor under 3000 metres of water.

In 2004, she took part in an anti-drug operation leading to the capture of 2 tonnes of cocaine.

In 2016, after the crash of EgyptAir Flight 804, Laplace was dispatched to search for the black boxes of the aircraft. She departed her base of Porto-Vecchio, in Corsica, on 27 May and arrived at the search area by 31 May. On 1 June Laplace detected a signal from one of the black box recorders.

== See also ==
- List of active French Navy ships
