= List of active French Navy landing craft =

List of active landing craft of the French Navy is a list of landing craft currently in service with the French Navy. These craft operate from the Mistral-class amphibious assault ships in service with the Force d'action navale (Naval Action Force) and are also based with French forces in Djibouti and in various of France's overseas territories.

== Landing craft ==
Class	Picture	Type	Craft	Displacement	Note
EDA-R class		Landing craft	L9092 EDA-R 1 L9093 EDA-R 2 L9094 EDA-R 3 L9095 EDA-R 4	300 tonnes	
Engin de débarquement amphibie standard (EDA-S class)		Landing craft	Arbalète (L9100); Arquebuse (L9101); Bombarde (L9102); Javeline (L9103); Pertuisane (L9104); Glaive (L9105); Dague (L9106); Mousquet (L9107); Épée (L9108); Sabre (L9109); Coutelas (L9110); Anne-Marie II (L9111); Rapière (L9112); Hallebarde (L9113)	c. 200 tonnes (full load)	Replacing CTM craft; 8 vessels delivered as of early 2026; Dague & Mousquet to be based in Djibouti; Épée in Mayotte; Sabre in New Caledonia; Coutelas in Martinique; Anne-Marie II in French Guiana
CTM class		Landing Craft Mechanized	Five units remaining in service as of January 2023	56 tonnes	One landing craft deployed in Mayotte; second with French forces in Djibouti

== See also ==
- French Navy
- List of active French Navy ships
