= French ship Tonnerre =

Eight ships of the French Navy have borne the name Tonnerre ("thunder"):

- French ship Tonnerre (1696) (1696–1713), formerly HMS Thunder, a captured 4-gun bomb ship.
- French gunboat Tonnerre (1759) (1759–1768), a gunboat
- French gunboat Tonnerre (1785) (1785–1807), a 3-gun gunboat
- French ship Tonnerre (1808) (1808–1809), a 74-gun Téméraire-class ship of the line
- French corvette Tonnerre (1838–1878), a 4-gun wheeled steam corvette
- French ironclad Tonnerre (1875–1921), an armoured coastal defence ship
- French ship Tonnerre (1946) (1946–1955), an armoured barge in Indochina
- French ship Tonnerre (L9014), a Mistral-class amphibious assault ship presently in service.

== Reference and sources ==
- Les bâtiments ayant porté le nom de Tonnerre
- Dictionnaire des bâtiments de la flotte de guerre de Colbert à nos jours, Jean-Michel Roche
