= French frigate Languedoc =

FREMM class multi-purpose frigates in the French Navy

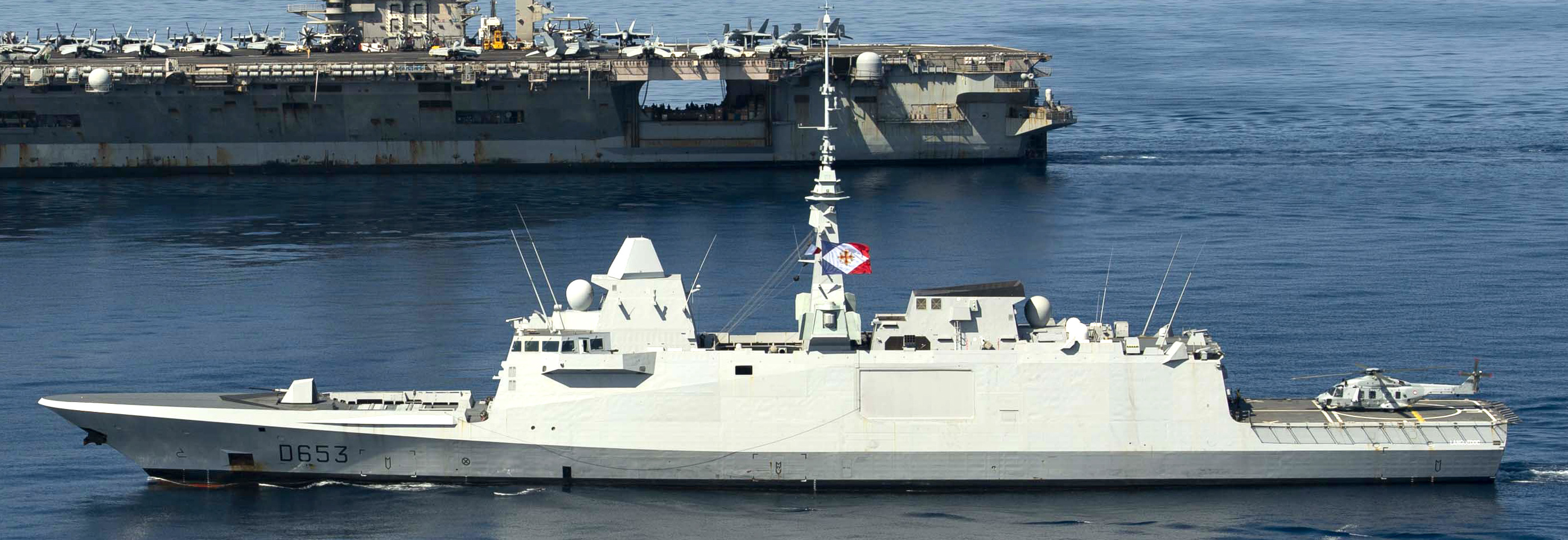
- Languedoc in the Mediterranean Sea, March 2021

History

France
- Name: Languedoc
- Namesake: Languedoc
- Builder: DCNS, Lorient
- Laid down: 30 November 2011
- Launched: 12 July 2014
- Completed: October 2015
- Commissioned: 4 July 2017
- Home port: Toulon
- Identification: MMSI number: 227999400; Pennant number: D653
- Status: Active

General characteristics
- Class & type: Aquitaine-class frigate
- Displacement: 6,000 tons
- Length: 466 ft (142.0 m)
- Beam: 65 ft (19.8 m)
- Draught: 16 ft (4.9 m)
- Propulsion: MTU Series 4000 (2,2 MW everyone); CODLOG
- Speed: 27 knots (50 km/h; 31 mph); max cruise speed 15.6 knots (28.9 km/h; 18.0 mph)
- Range: 6,000 nmi (11,000 km; 6,900 mi) at 15 knots (28 km/h; 17 mph)
- Complement: 145
- Sensors & processing systems: Héraklès multi-purpose passive electronically scanned array radar; CAPTAS-4 towed-array sonar; UMS 4110 CL hull-mounted sonar
- Armament: 1 × 76 mm Super Rapid gun; 3 × 20 mm Narwhal remote weapon systems; 16-cell SYLVER A43 VLS for Aster 15 air defense missiles; 16-cell SYLVER A70 VLS for MdCN cruise missiles; 8 × Exocet MM40 Block 3 anti-ship missiles (Block 3c variant entering service with the French Navy from December 2022); 2 × B-515 twin launchers for MU90 torpedoes
- Aircraft carried: 1 × NH90 helicopter
- Aviation facilities: Single hangar

Languedoc (D653) is an Aquitaine-class frigate of the French Navy. The Aquitaine class were developed from the FREMM multipurpose frigate program.

== Development and design ==
Original plans were for 17 FREMM to replace the nine D'Estienne d'Orves-class avisos and nine anti-submarine frigates of the Tourville and Georges Leygues classes. In November 2005 France announced a contract of €3.5 billion for development and the first eight hulls, with options for nine more costing €2.95 billion split over two tranches (totaling 17).

Following the cancellation of the third and fourth of the Horizon-class frigates in 2005 on budget grounds, requirements for an air-defence derivative of the FREMM called FREDA were placed – with DCNS coming up with several proposals. Expectations were that the last two ships of the 17 FREMM planned would be built to FREDA specifications; however, by 2008 the plan was revised down to just 11 FREMM (9 ASW variants and 2 FREDA variants) at a cost of €8.75 billion (FY13, ~US$12 billion). The 11 ships would cost €670 million (~US$760m) each in FY2014, or €860m (~US$980m) including development costs. In 2015, the total number of ASW variants was further reduced to just six units, including Languedoc.

== Construction and career ==
Languedoc was developed as part of a joint Italian-French program known as FREMM, which was implemented to develop a new class of frigates for use by various European navies. Constructed from 2011. On 12 July 2014, the frigate Languedoc was launched.

On 14 April 2018, the frigate participated in the bombing of Barzeh and Him Shinshar in Syria with the United States and the United Kingdom. Neither Aquitaine nor Auvergne were able to fire their missiles, and it was Languedoc which carried out by firing three MdCN of which this is the first operational use.

On 24 April 2019, Languedoc, HMS Duncan, USS Mobile Bay, USS Bainbridge and Méndez Núñez conducted exercises in the Mediterranean Sea with USS Abraham Lincoln and USS John C. Stennis.

Languedoc was engaged, alongside HNLMS De Ruyter and an Atlantique maritime patrol plane, in Operation Agenor for the benefit of the European Union (within the framework of EMASOH) for the surveillance of the Strait of Hormuz from 19 May 2020, replacing the frigate Forbin. On 6 August 2020, the incorporation of Languedoc into the operation was extended by three months thanks to the replacement of crew B by the A – which is a first for a French Navy vessel in operation since the passage to double crew in 2019, carried out in 72 hours at the French naval base in Abu Dhabi at Port Zayed, thus ensuring the permanence and continuity of the frigate's commitment to its mission. The frigate was then accompanied by HDMS Iver Huitfeldt replacing HNLMS De Ruyter.

On 27 March 2021, Languedoc conducted underway replenishment to receive fuel from the aircraft carrier USS Dwight D. Eisenhower in the Mediterranean Sea and in July 2022 she was sailing with the USS Harry S. Truman carrier strike group (HSTCSG) in the Mediterranean.

In mid 2023, the frigate was operating in the Indian Ocean and Persian Gulf, accompanying the nuclear attack submarine Suffren for part of that deployment. On 26 November 2023, Languedoc completed a transit of the Strait of Hormuz to enter the waters of the Persian Gulf as the Strike Group continues to support USCENTCOM missions. On 9 December 2023, Languedoc shot down two unmanned aerial vehicles in the Red Sea 110 kilometres (59 nmi) off Al Hudaydah, Yemen. The frigate returned to Toulon in March 2024 after seven months on deployment.

After the Iranian strikes on RAF Akrotiri, France sent Languedoc to help defend the island of Cyprus alongside the Cypriot National Guard and Hellenic Armed Forces.

During the deployment in Red Sea and Indian Ocean, the ship conducted a port call from 31 August to 4 September 2026 in India's Mormugao Port.

== Gallery ==
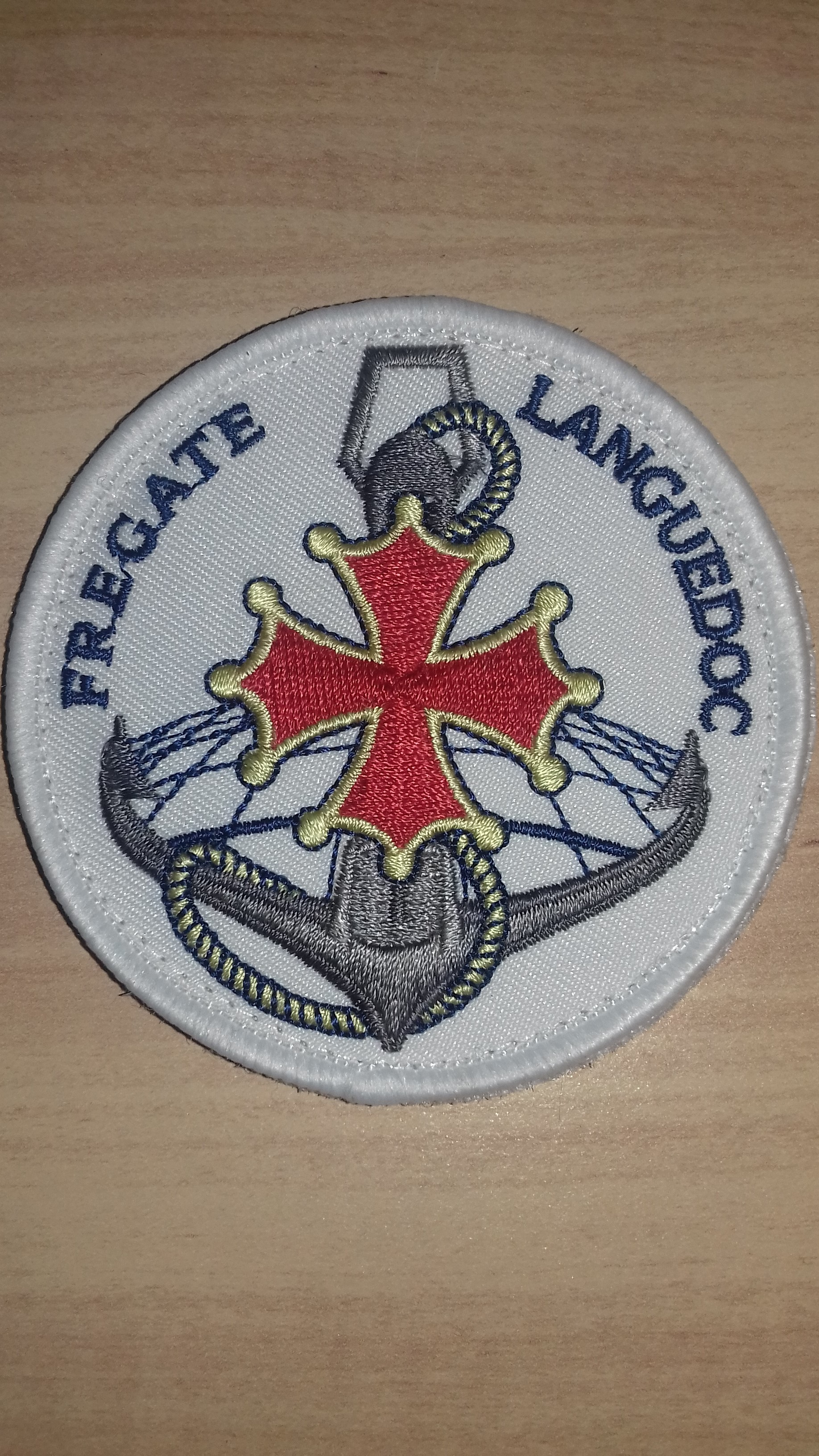
Languedoc's patch

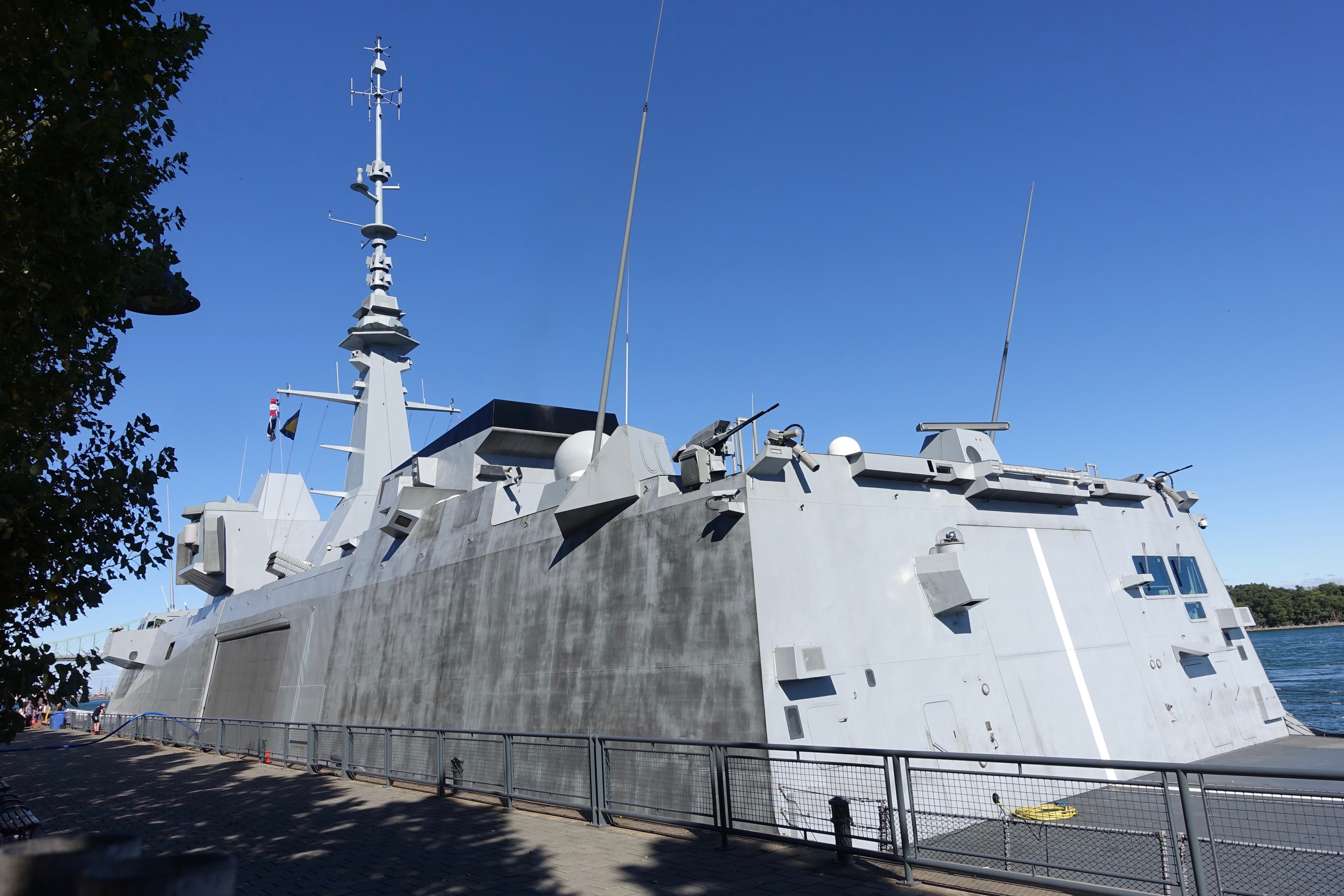
Languedoc at Montreal on 25 September 2016.

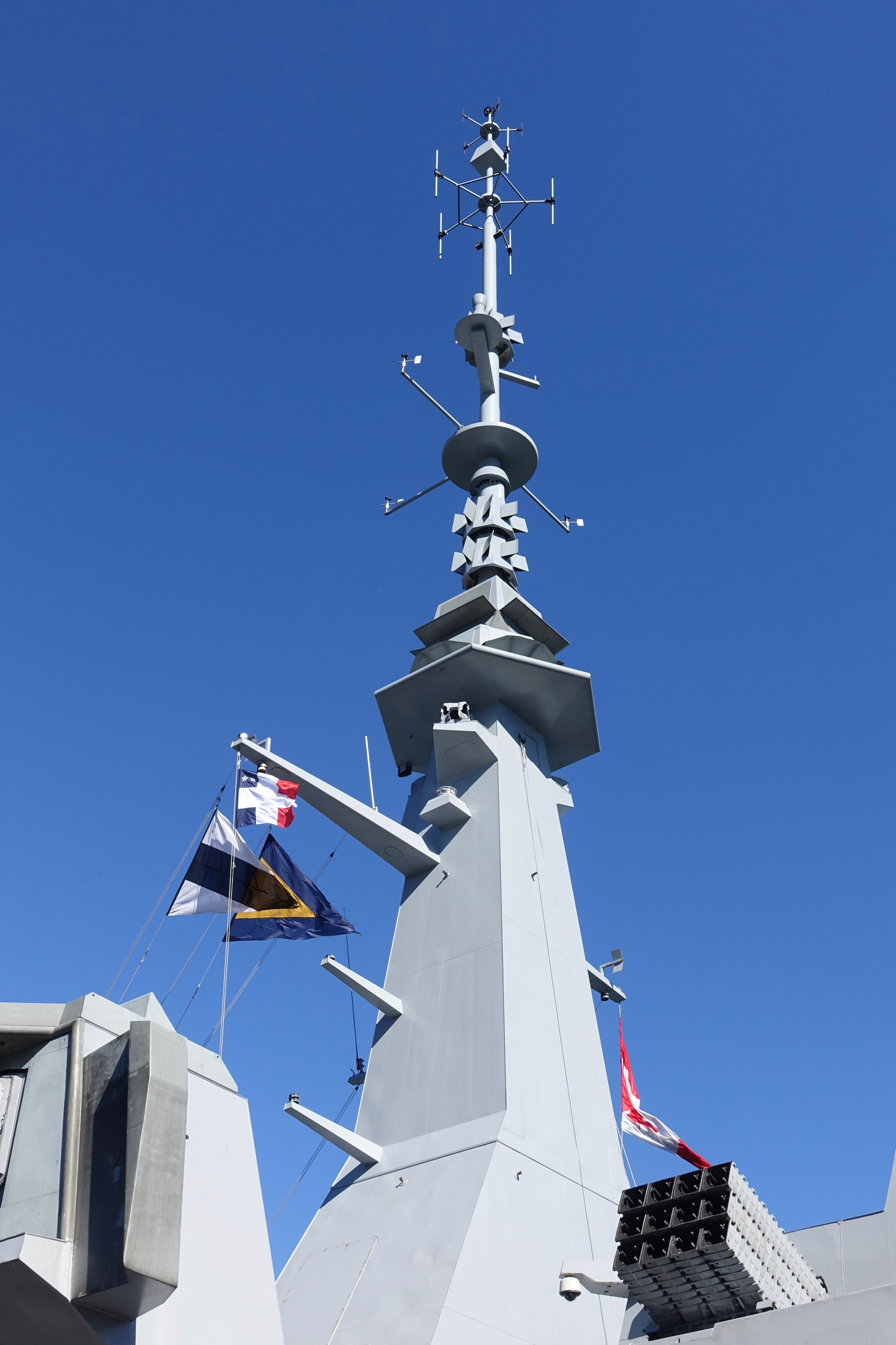
Languedoc at Montreal on 25 September 2016.

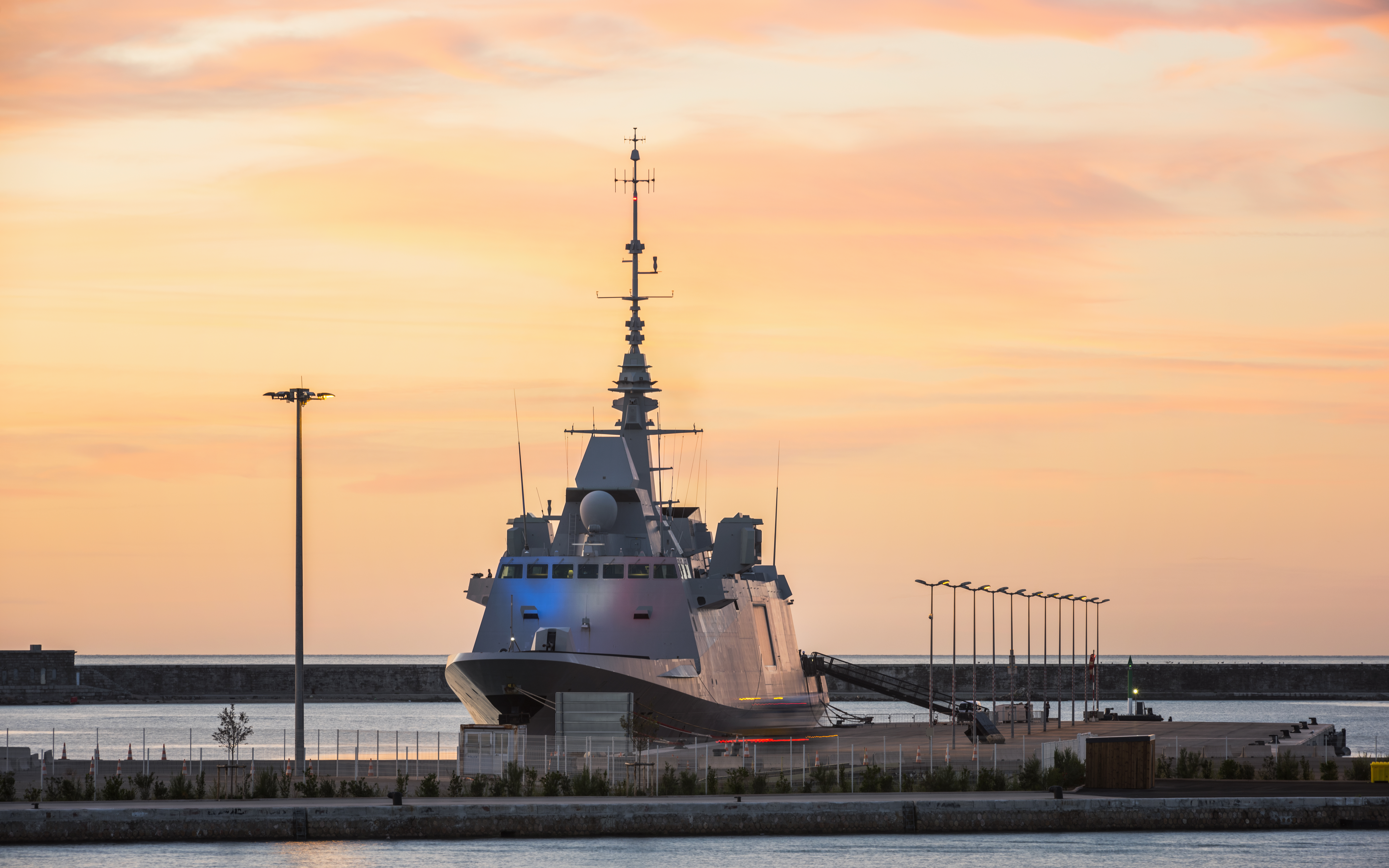
Languedoc at Sète on 24 September 2019
