= MdCN =

French naval cruise missile

Missile de Croisière Naval (Naval Cruise Missile)
- Type: Cruise missile Land-attack missile Submarine-launched cruise missile
- Place of origin: France

Service history
- In service: 2017 - present (frigates); 2022 - present (submarines)

Production history
- Manufacturer: MBDA France
- Unit cost: €2.48m (US$3.19 million) (FY2012)
- Produced: 2014 - 2021; May 2026 - present

Specifications
- Mass: 1,400 kg (3,086 lb)
- Length: 6.5 m (21 ft 4 in)
- Diameter: 500 mm (20 in)
- Wingspan: 2.85 m (9 ft 4 in)
- Effective firing range: Ship-launched: 1,400 km (870 mi; 760 nmi); Submarine-launched: 1,000 km (620 mi; 540 nmi)
- Warhead: 250 kg (550 lb) HE multipurpose warhead
- Engine: Microturbo TR50 turbojet engine
- Maximum speed: 800 km/h (500 mph; 430 kn; Mach 0.65)
- Guidance system: inertial guidance, topographic (TERCOM/TERPROM), active radar homing and infrared guidance, GPS
- Launch platform: FREMM multipurpose frigate Barracuda-class submarine Scorpène-class submarine Kimon class frigate

The Missile de Croisière Naval (MdCN), meaning Naval Cruise Missile, is a French turbojet-powered subsonic cruise missile intended for ship and submarine-based land-attack operations. Originally dubbed SCALP Naval, the program arose out of a requirement issued by the French Ministry of Defence for a more potent cruise missile capable of striking strategic and military targets from extended stand-off ranges in order to complement the air-launched SCALP-EG.

The MdCN entered operational service with the French Navy in 2017.

== Development ==
Studies for the development of a ship-launched version of the SCALP air-launched cruise missile were begun by MBDA's French division in 2002, following a failed attempt by France to acquire the Tomahawk cruise missile from the United States. In 2006, full development began of a longer range naval vertical-launched cruise missile to be deployed on a new series of French warships in the 2010s. It became operational on the anti-submarine/land-attack ships of the French Aquitaine-class (the French variant of the FREMM multipurpose frigate) from 2017 onwards and on FS Suffren (the first of the Barracuda-class submarines) in June 2022, using the A70 version of the Sylver launcher on the former and the 533 mm torpedo tubes on the latter. As it is not launched from a plane like the SCALP, the MdCN uses a booster during its launch phase to break out of the ship and gain some initial velocity.

The submarine version is encapsulated in a hydrodynamic hard container which is ejected when the missile reaches the surface. Expected to fulfill a similar role as the American-developed BGM-109 Tomahawk, the range of the MdCN (well over 1000 km) is double that of the SCALP. The smaller Scorpène-class submarines can also carry the MdCN missile. In addition to its longer range, the MdCN also distinguishes itself by its autonomous navigation performance and terminal guidance by infrared recognition.

France originally ordered 50 MdCN for its frigates in 2006 and delivery was expected in 2012. A further 100 surface-launched missiles were ordered in 2009, along with 50 for the planned Barracuda-class submarines. The €1.2bn (FY2011) project was to deliver 200 missiles at a unit cost of €2.48m, or €6m including development costs.

The MdCN's first complete qualification firing took place in July 2013, at the Biscarosse test range. During its third development firing, the MdCN perfectly met all its test requirements, including the validation of its autonomous navigation performance and terminal guidance by infrared recognition, which provide the weapon with its exceptionally high precision.

== Operational history ==
The MdCN was used in its first operational strike during the April 2018 missile strikes against Syria against the Syrian chemical weapons production site, in coordination with the United States and the United Kingdom. In addition to ten SCALP cruise missiles fired from five Dassault Rafale aircraft (along with others from RAF Tornados), the FREMM frigates Aquitaine, Provence, and Languedoc launched three MdCN missiles.

Although all the designated targets were reached during the mission, some missiles suffered considerable technical difficulties. In the navy's report, it was stated that nine SCALP missiles were successfully fired, but the last one failed an internal self-check and refused to take off from the rail, and was therefore abandoned at sea. Meanwhile, two frigates suffered from computer issues and were unable to launch their MdCNs; only the third frigate was able to do so.

The problems encountered with the frigates suggest that the MdCN had issues integrating with the warships, most likely due to the new nature of the FREMMs, rather than with the missile itself. Some FREMMs deployed during the operation were not fully operationally ready, having been withdrawn from exercises only a few days prior. In the same report, it was also stated that the issues with the MdCN and the warships have already been fixed.

On 20 October 2020, it was reported that the first of the new Barracuda-class submarines to be commissioned, Suffren, had performed its first firing of the MdCN. The firing from the new submarine was highly awaited because of the technical issues encountered during the missile's first operational use in 2018, which had led to deeper scrutiny. The test was successful. Suffren entered operational service on 3 June 2022.

On 18 April 2024, FREMM frigate Aquitaine and a Suffren-class submarine launched a simultaneous training firing of MdcN and two missiles reached the target in synchronization.

On 19 September 2024, during the event of launching ceremony for the frigate Kimon-class frigate Nearchos, the Greek Defense Minister announced that Greece is starting procedures to acquire a fourth frigate of the same type. He also revealed that Greece will proceed with the order of strategic MdCN missiles installed on the new ships.

== See also ==
- AV-TM 300
- Babur
- BGM-109 Tomahawk
- CJ-10
- Hoveyzeh
- Hsiung Feng IIE
- Hyunmoo-3
- Kalibr
- Kh-55
- Nirbhay
- RK-55
