= Support vessel =

Support vessel may refer to:

== Military ship classes ==
- Auxiliary ship, designed to support warships
- Bacolod City-class logistics support vessel, a ship class in the Philippine Navy
- General Frank S. Besson-class logistics support vessel, a type of watercraft in the United States Army
- Immediate Support Vessel, a type of patrol boat in the Indian Navy
- Maneuver Support Vessel (Light), a type of landing craft in the United States Army
- Marino-class diving support vessel, a diving vessel in the Italian Navy
- Multi-Role Support Vessel (India)
- Multi-role support ship (Malaysia)

== Other ==
- Diving support vessel, a ship that is used as a floating base for professional diving projects
- Yacht support vessel
