= Suffren-class submarine =

Nuclear attack submarine

Suffren class
- Suffren class profile

Class overview
- Name: Suffren class
- Builders: Naval Group
- Operators: French Navy
- Preceded by: Rubis class
- Subclasses: Orka class
- Cost: €10.42 billion (2014) (equivalent to €12.61 billion in 2025) for 6 units (about €1.73 billion (2014) (equivalent to €2.09 billion in 2025) per unit )
- Built: 2007–present
- In commission: 2020–present
- Planned: 6
- Building: 2
- Completed: 4
- Active: 4

General characteristics
- Type: Nuclear attack submarine
- Displacement: 4,765 t (4,690 long tons) surfaced; 5,300 t (5,200 long tons) submerged
- Length: 99.5 m (326 ft 5 in)
- Beam: 8.8 m (28 ft 10 in)
- Draught: 7.3 m (23 ft 11 in)
- Propulsion: 1 × K15 nuclear reactor, 150 MW (200,000 hp); 2 × turbo generator groups: 10 MW (13,000 hp) each; 2 × SEMPT Pielstick emergency diesel generators 480 kW (640 hp) each; 1 × pump-jet electrically driven
- Speed: 25 kn (46 km/h; 29 mph) submerged; 14 kn (26 km/h; 16 mph) surfaced
- Range: Unlimited range
- Endurance: ~ 70 days (food storage can be increased)
- Test depth: >350 m (1,150 ft)
- Complement: 12 officers; 48 petty officers
- Sensors & processing systems: System: Naval Group SYCOBS combat management system; NEMESIS electronic countermeasure system with CANTO-S decoys and automatic evasive manoeuvres (confusion/dilution principle); Thales PARTNER communications management system; Masts: Safran Series-30AOM / SOM attack and search optronics mast (equipped with integral RESM antennas); Safran Series 10 CSR mast with Sentinel-U radar; Safran SIGMA 40 XP gyrolaser navigation systems; Sonars: Thales UMS-3000 hull and flank array sonar suite; Thales ETBF DSUV 62C towed array sonar; Thales SEACLEAR mine and obstacle avoidance sonar; Thales VELOX-M8 broadband sonar interceptor; Thales NUSS-2F Mk2 navigation echo sounder; Communications: Thales DIVESAT communications satellite mast with Syracuse satellite link; Data links: Link 11, Link 16 and Link 22; Thales TUUM-5 MK2 distressed submarine (DISSUB) communication system
- Armament: 4 × 533 mm (21.0 in) torpedo-tubes and 20 storage racks for: F21 Artemis heavyweight torpedoes; MdCN land-attack missiles; Exocet SM39 Mod2 anti-ship missiles; Naval Group D-19T UUV; FG29 multi-influence mines

The Suffren class, formerly known as the Barracuda, is a class of nuclear-powered attack submarines designed for the French Navy by the French shipbuilder Naval Group (formerly DCNS). It is intended to replace the Rubis class. Construction began in 2007 and the lead boat of the class, Suffren, was commissioned on 6 November 2020. It officially entered active service on 3 June 2022.

== History ==
=== Development ===
In October 1998, the Delegation Générale pour l'Armement, the French government's defense procurement agency, established an integrated project team consisting of the Naval Staff, DCN (now known as Naval Group), Technicatome and the Commissariat à l'Énergie Atomique, a regulatory body that oversees nuclear power plants, to oversee a program the design of a new attack submarine class, called Barracuda. DCN was to be the boat's designer and builder while Technicatome (since acquired by Areva) was to be responsible for the nuclear power plant. The two companies were to act jointly as a single prime contractor to share the industrial risks, manage the schedules, and be responsible for the design's performance and costs, which at the time was estimated to be US$4.9 billion.

On 22 December 2006, the French government placed a €7.9 billion order for six Suffren submarines with Naval Group and their nuclear power plants with Areva-Technicatome. According to the DGA "Competition at the subcontractor level will be open to foreign companies for the first time." According to the contract, the first boat was to commence sea trials in early 2016, with delivery occurring in late 2016/early 2017. This was to be followed by entry into service in late 2017. However, this timetable for service entry was later pushed back into the early 2020s.

The first boat of the class, Suffren, became fully operational in June 2022. The second boat of the class, Duguay-Trouin, also suffered delays but began sea trials on 26 March 2023, performing her first dive on 27 and 28 March. The submarine was formally delivered to the French Navy in August 2023. In early 2024, Duguay-Trouin deployed to the Caribbean as part of her ongoing trials and was declared fully operational in April 2024. The third submarine in the class, Tourville, began her sea trials in July 2024 and was delivered in November 2024. The fourth boat in the class, De Grasse, began her sea trials in February 2026 and was delivered in June 2026.

In late 2025 it was reported that a faster than anticipated build schedule meant that all six vessels of the class were likely to be in commission by 2029.

== Description ==
The Barracudas will integrate technology from the Triomphant class, including pump-jet propulsion. They will be fitted with torpedo tube-launched MdCN cruise missiles for long-range (well above 1,000 km; 620 mi) strikes against strategic land targets. Their missions will include anti-surface and anti-submarine warfare, land attack, intelligence gathering, crisis management and special operations.

The Barracuda class nuclear reactor incorporates several improvements over that of the preceding Rubis class. Notably, it extends the time between refueling and complex overhauls (RCOHs) from 7 to 10 years, enabling higher at-sea availability.

In support of special operations missions, the Barracuda can also accommodate up to 15 Commandos Marine. It integrates a removable dry deck shelter aft of the sail able to embark the commandos' new generation PSM3G Swimmer Delivery Vehicle (ECA Special Warfare Underwater Vehicle).

== Specifications ==
=== Modifications ===
There are changes planned on some of the ships. The main one includes the Antenne Linéaire Remorquée à technologie Optique (ALRO) under development by Thales for the SNLE 3G is expected to replace the ETBF DSUV 62C towed array sonar on the Barracuda-class submarines. The Exocet SM39 submarine-launched anti-ship missile was initially expected to be replaced via the FMAN/FMC led by MBDA. However, the programme is no longer expected to produce any missile capable of being launched from submarines as their dimensions will not be compatible with torpedo tubes. MBDA is therefore pitching its Exocet SM40 under development as a successor to the SM39 post-2030.

== Boats ==
Pennant no.	Name	Laid down	Launched	Commissioned	Full operational capability	Homeport
S635	Suffren	19 December 2007	12 July 2019	6 November 2020	3 June 2022	Toulon
S636	Duguay-Trouin	June 2009	9 September 2022	28 July 2023	4 April 2024	Toulon
S637	Tourville	June 2011	Summer 2023	16 November 2024	5 July 2025	Toulon
S638	De Grasse	2014	Spring 2025	20 November 2026	20 November 2026	Toulon
S639	Rubis	2019	2026/27	2027/28	2028/29	Toulon
TBC	Casabianca	2020	2028	2029	2029/30	Toulon

== Shortfin Barracuda conventional variant ==
=== Australia ===
Naval Group submitted a conventionally powered diesel-electric variation to the design – named the Shortfin Barracuda Block 1A, a derivative of the SMX Ocean concept – to the competitive evaluation process (CEP) phase of Australia's Collins-class submarine replacement. "While exact details remain confidential, DCNS can confirm the Shortfin Barracuda is over 90 metres (300 ft) in length and displaces more than 4,000 tons when dived," said Sean Costello, CEO of Naval Group Australia. Naval Group was chosen by the Australian Government on 26 April 2016 to build twelve of the Shortfin Barracuda Block 1A variant at a projected AU$50 billion (US$37.6 billion). Much of the works were to be undertaken at ASC Pty Ltd in Adelaide, South Australia. Construction was expected to begin in 2023. The class would have been known as the Attack-class submarine with the first vessel named HMAS Attack.

On 16 September 2021, Australia cancelled the Attack-class project and entered into a partnership with the United States and United Kingdom to obtain nuclear submarine technology (SSN-AUKUS). The reactors are intended to run on weapons-grade uranium, be sealed, and last for thirty three years. The ones France uses, on the other hand, have to be serviced every ten years since it switched from weapons-grade to low-enriched uranium (LEU) to fuel its nuclear-powered submarines from the Rubis class onward.

=== Netherlands ===
The Shortfin Barracuda class was proposed by Naval Group to the Royal Netherlands Navy as one of the three competitors in the Walrus-class replacement program. The design was competing against the Saab A26 submarine and the TKMS Type 212 submarine. On 15 March 2024 State Secretary for Defence Christophe van der Maat announced that Naval Group had been selected as the winning bid. The boats will be known as the Orka class, with the first two planned to be delivered within ten years of the contract signing.

=== Greece ===
In July 2025, a formal process to acquire four additional submarines was started as part of a 20-year modernization plan estimated to cost $25 billion. The Type 218, Type 209NG, Scorpène class, conventional Barracuda class and Blekinge class submarines are being considered.

== See also ==
- List of submarines of France
- Submarine forces (France)
- Future of the French Navy
- Future of the Royal Netherlands Navy
- Cruise missile submarine
