= French submarine Suffren =

French nuclear attack submarine

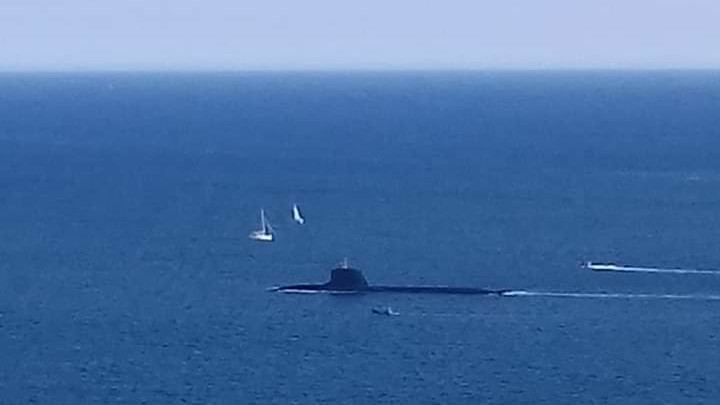
- Suffren at Cape Brun off Toulon on 26 July 2020

History

France
- Name: Suffren
- Namesake: Admiral comte Pierre André de Suffren de Saint Tropez, bailli de Suffren
- Builder: Naval Group
- Laid down: 19 December 2007
- Launched: 1 August 2019
- Commissioned: 6 November 2020
- In service: 3 June 2022

General characteristics
- Class & type: Suffren-class submarine
- Displacement: 4,765 t surfaced; 5,300 t submerged
- Length: 99.5 m (326 ft 5 in)
- Beam: 8.8 m (28 ft 10 in)
- Draught: 7.3 m (23 ft 11 in)
- Propulsion: K15 nuclear reactor, 150 MW (200,000 hp); 2 x Turbo-generator groups: 10 MW (13,000 hp) each; 2 x emergency diesel generators 480 kW (640 hp) each; 1 x pump-jet electrically driven
- Speed: >25 kn (46 km/h; 29 mph), submerged; 14 kn (26 km/h; 16 mph), surfaced
- Range: Unlimited
- Endurance: 70 days of food
- Complement: 12 officers; 48 petty officers
- Sensors & processing systems: Hull and flank sonar Thales UMS-3000; SYCOBS; SEACLEAR; Velox-M8
- Armament: 4 × 533 mm (21.0 in) tubes; 20 storage racks, including; MdCN cruise missiles; Exocet SM39 anti-ship missiles; F21 Artemis heavy torpedoes; FG29 mines

Suffren (Q284/S635) is a French nuclear attack submarine. It is the lead ship of the Suffren class, stemming from the Barracuda program. The vessel, like several others before it, is named after Vice-Admiral Pierre André de Suffren.

The Suffren was laid down on 19 December 2007 and launched on 1 August 2019 at Cherbourg. It was commissioned on 6 November 2020; while full operational service had originally been anticipated in 2021, this was pushed back into 2022 after further testing/trials by the French Navy. Pursuant to testing the submarine was then declared fully operational on 3 June 2022.

== Design ==
Unlike previous French submarines, Suffren is not equipped with a periscope, but rather an optronic mast, which allows for much longer range and outside visible spectrum detection of targets.

A first for the French Navy is the ability to deploy a small underwater vehicle for special forces use (similar to the US Navy ASDS) thanks to a dry deck shelter. Previously special forces used torpedo tubes and handheld propulsion systems.

The vessel also has the ability to use the MdCN ground attack cruise missile in its submarine-borne version, launched via torpedo tube.

It is said to be ten times quieter than the previous generation Rubis-class nuclear attack submarine.

== Crew ==
Suffren is optimized for a small complement thanks to extensive automation throughout the ship. While being twice the size, it has a smaller crew than the preceding Rubis class. This combined larger hull and smaller crew compared to the Rubis class makes this ship the first French submarine to be designed to allow women on board. It has spacious separate living quarters for men and women.

== Construction and career ==
The submarine was unveiled to the public on 12 July 2019 in Cherbourg, with a three-year delay, in front of French President Emmanuel Macron and Defense Minister Florence Parly. The K15 nuclear reactor came online on 18 December 2019. Sea trials started in 2020. The submarine was commissioned on 6 November 2020 and became fully operational on 3 June 2022.

From July to October 2023, the submarine operated in the Indian Ocean and Persian Gulf for three months, accompanied for part of its deployment by the frigate Languedoc.
