= French submarine Duguay-Trouin =

French nuclear attack submarine

History

France
- Name: Duguay-Trouin
- Builder: Naval Group
- Laid down: 26 June 2009
- Launched: 9 September 2022
- Commissioned: 28 July 2023
- In service: 4 April 2024

General characteristics
- Class & type: Suffren-class submarine
- Displacement: 4,765 t surfaced; 5,300 t submerged
- Length: 99.5 m (326 ft 5 in)
- Beam: 8.8 m (28 ft 10 in)
- Draught: 7.3 m (23 ft 11 in)
- Propulsion: K15 nuclear reactor, 150 MW (200,000 hp); 2 x Turbo-generator groups: 10 MW (13,000 hp) each; 2 x emergency diesel generators 480 kW (640 hp) each; 1 x pump-jet electrically driven
- Speed: >25 kn (46 km/h; 29 mph), submerged; 14 kn (26 km/h; 16 mph), surfaced
- Range: Unlimited
- Endurance: 70 days of food
- Complement: 12 officers; 48 petty officers
- Sensors & processing systems: Hull and flank sonar Thales UMS-3000; SYCOBS; SEACLEAR; Velox-M8
- Armament: 4 × 533 mm (21.0 in) tubes; 20 storage racks, including; MdCN cruise missiles; Exocet SM39 anti-ship missiles; F21 Artemis heavy torpedoes; FG29 mines

Duguay-Trouin (S636) is a French nuclear attack submarine and the second boat of the Suffren class. The vessel was laid down on 26 June 2009 and launched on 9 September 2022 at Cherbourg. It was commissioned on 28 July 2023.
