= 2008 French White Paper on Defence and National Security =

2008 French national security reform

The 2008 French White Paper on Defence and National Security was a defence reform of the French Armed Forces. On 31 July 2007, president Nicolas Sarkozy ordered M. Jean-Claude Mallet, a member of the Council of State, to head up a 35-member commission charged with a wide-ranging review of French defence. The commission issued its white paper (French: livre blanc) in early 2008. Acting upon its recommendations, Sarkozy began making radical changes in French defence policy and structures starting in the summer of 2008. The proposed force structure was to be complete by 2014-15.

== Summary ==
- As part of the white paper Sarkozy declared that France "will now participate fully in NATO."
- Total cuts of 54,000 personnel.
- The French Armed Forces will retain the ability to deploy up to 30,000 troops in a single overseas deployment.
- For the first time, cyber security (both defensive and offensive) was also listed as a key priority for the French state.

=== French Army ===
- A reduction in personnel to 131,000 regular and civilian personnel. Of which the 'operational force' of the army will consist of 88,000 troops.
- A reduction of over 150 Leclerc main battle tanks to an operational fleet of 250.
- A strength of 80 attack helicopters and 130 support helicopters.
- Orders for 25,000 FELIN-type infantry combat suits.

=== French Navy ===
- A reduction in personnel to 44,000 regular and civilian personnel.
- Possibility of a new aircraft carrier to complement the existing Charles de Gaulle (R91). Final decision to be made in 2012.
- Possibility of a 4th Mistral-class amphibious assault ship.
- The 5 La Fayette-class light frigates to be re-classified as "1st rank frigates".
- A total strength of 18 "1st rank frigates" (including the less powerful La Fayette-class).
- Expected order of FREMM multipurpose frigates reduced from 17 to 11. Units 10 and 11 to be built in the air-defence role (FREDA derivative).
- 6 light surveillance frigates to remain in service (the Floréal-class).
- The construction of 6 Barracuda-class submarines.

=== French Air Force ===
- A reduction in personnel to around 50,000 regular and civilian personnel.
- Operational command of French Air Force and French Navy fast-jet combat aircraft will be combined under the Chief of the Defence Staff.
- The air force and navy will operate no more than 300 fast-jet combat aircraft consisting of; Dassault Rafale multi-role fighters and modernised Mirage 2000-D strike aircraft.
- Ability to deploy up to 70 fast-jet combat aircraft overseas.
- 4 air force and 3 navy AEW&C systems.
- A fleet of refueling tanker and transports aircraft comprising; 14 Airbus A330 refueling tankers and 70 tactical transport aircraft.

== See also ==
- 2013 French White Paper on Defence and National Security
