= French ship Richelieu =

Four ships of the French Navy have been named in honour of Armand-Jean du Plessis, Cardinal Richelieu, considered to be one of the founders of the French Navy.

== Ships ==
- French ironclad Richelieu (1873), a central battery ironclad. (Note: In French Navy parlance, an "armoured frigate" ("frégate cuirassée").)
- French patrol boat Richelieu (1915), an auxiliary, La Tanche-like, patrol boat.
- French battleship Richelieu (1939), a fast battleship.
- French aircraft carrier Charles de Gaulle was originally to have been named Richelieu.
- French aircraft carrier PA2 (now cancelled) would potentially have been named Richelieu.
Ships of the French Navy named Richelieu
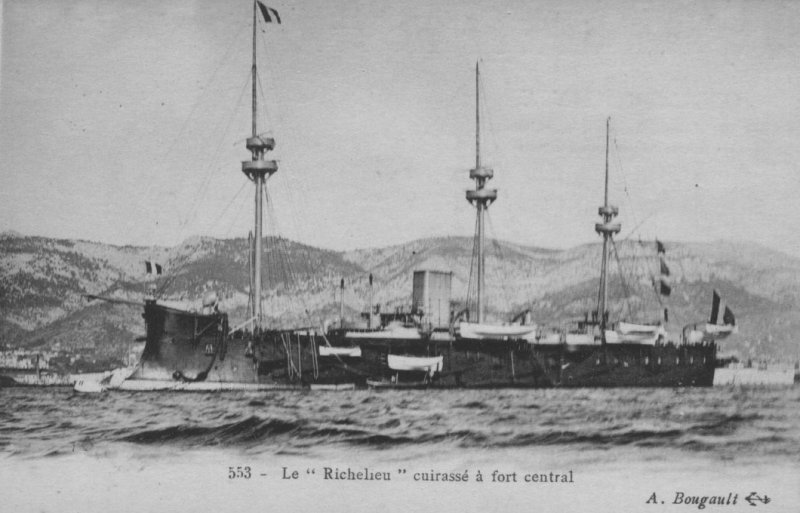
Ironclad Richelieu (1873)

Tanche, similar to the auxiliary submarine hunter Richelieu

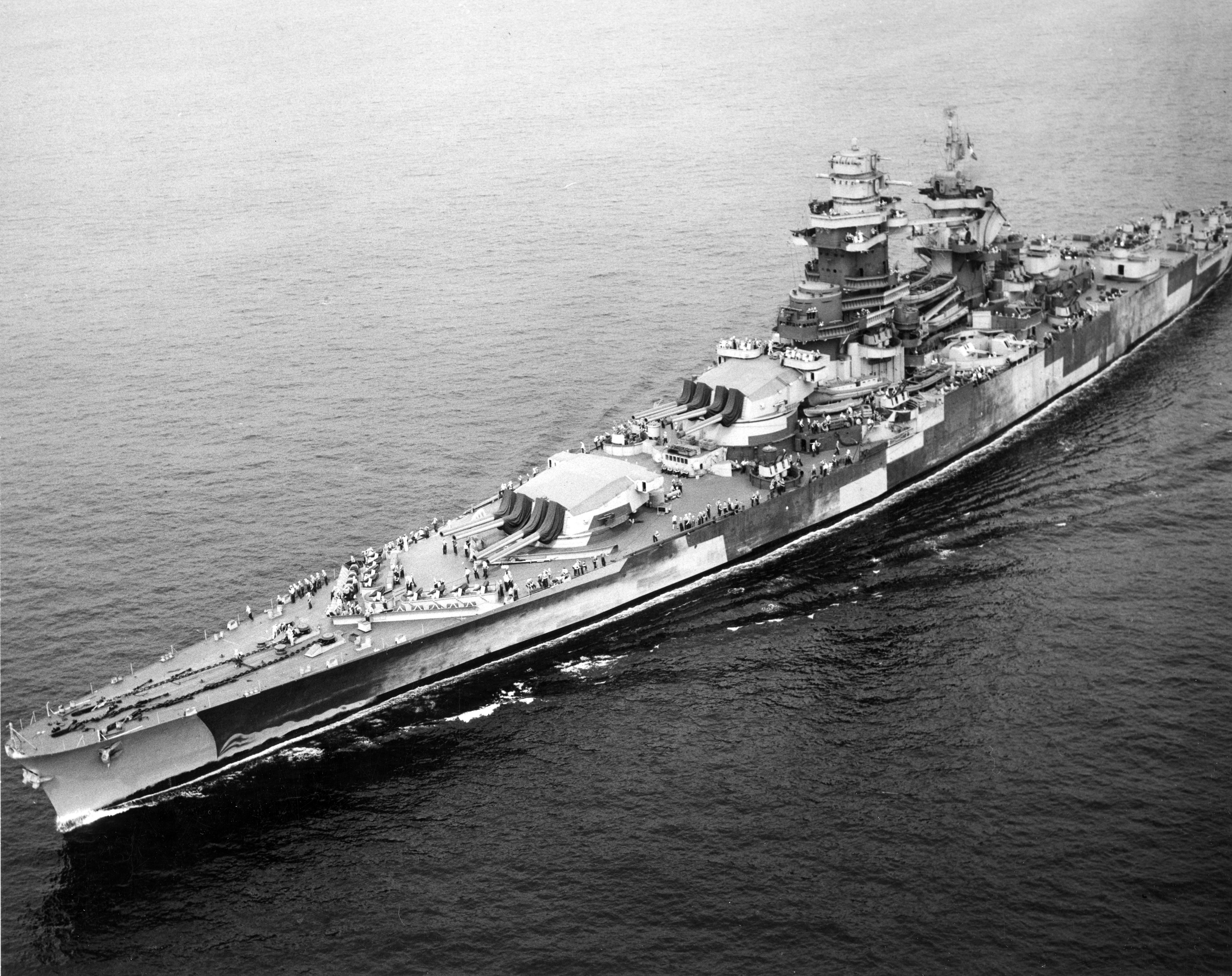
The battleship Richelieu (1939)

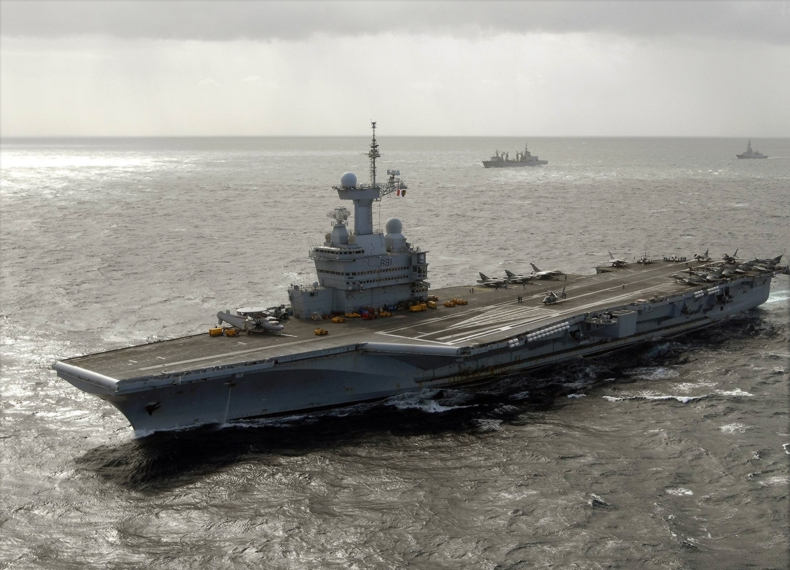
The nuclear carrier Charles de Gaulle

== Notes and references ==
=== Bibliography ===
- Roche, Jean-Michel (2005). Dictionnaire des bâtiments de la flotte de guerre française de Colbert à nos jours. Vol. 2. Group Retozel-Maury Millau. p. 423. ISBN 978-2-9525917-0-6. OCLC 165892922.
