= Tartar Guided Missile Fire Control System =

American air-defense system

The Tartar Guided Missile Fire Control System is an air defense system developed by the United States Navy to defend warships from air attack. Since its introduction the system has been improved and sold to several United States allies.

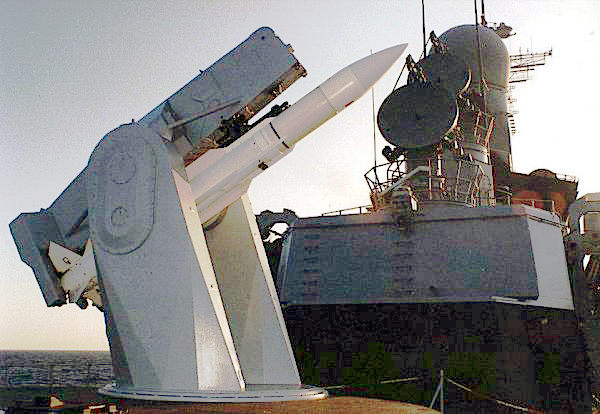
A RIM-66 Standard missile on the launcher aboard the French frigate Cassard (D 614)

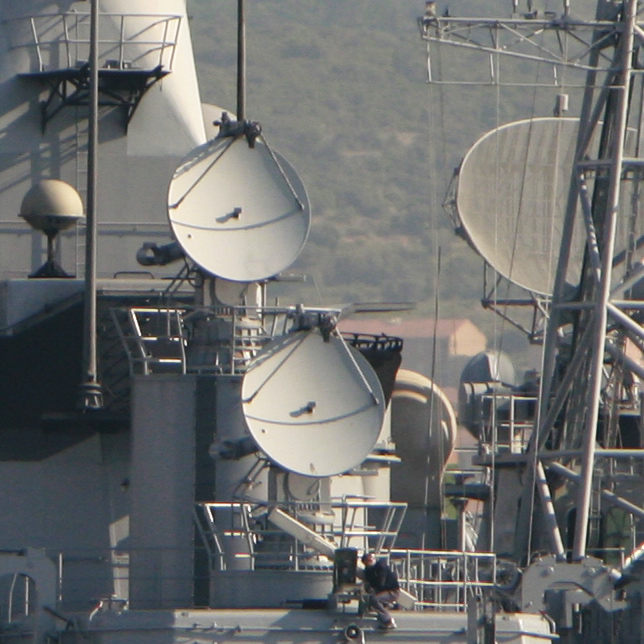
TARTAR fire control AN/SPG-51 radars of a Cassard-class frigate

== Description ==
The Tartar Guided Missile Fire Control System is a component of the overall Tartar Weapons System. It consists of the target illuminators and associated computer systems needed to fire a missile once a target has been identified. It operates in conjunction with the weapon direction systems (WDS), the ship's long-range air search radars, and the guided missile launch system (GMLS) to engage air targets.

The Tartar FCS receives target designation information from the WDS. The system then acquires and tracks the target, positions the missile launcher, programs the missile with intercept data, and lets the WDS know that it is ready to fire. Once the missile is fired, the FCS provides CW illumination of the target and postfiring evaluation.

There are two major families of Tartar FCS: the Mk. 74 and the Mk. 92. The latter is used on the Oliver Hazard Perry-class frigate and the former is used everywhere else. Each Mk 74 includes the AN/SPG-51, a director Mk 73, a computer system, and associated consoles. The Mk. 92 contains a combined antenna system (CAS), a separate track illumination radar (STIR), weapon control consoles, a computer complex, and ancillary equipment.

== Deployment ==
It was installed on numerous US cruiser and destroyers in the 1960s through early 1990s such as the California-class cruisers, Virginia-class cruisers, Kidd-class destroyers and the Charles F. Adams-class destroyers. It is also in use in other countries such as the fleet escorts of the French Navy Kersaint, Bouvet, Du Chayla and Dupetit-Thouars, and was also in use on Cassard and Jean Bart.

== RIM-66B Standard ==
Starting in the middle 1960s a new family of guided missiles referred to as the Standard missiles were developed to replace the poor performing missiles used by existing fire control systems. The RIM-66A/B Standard replaced the earlier RIM-24C Tartar used by the system. The new missile made Tartar into a true medium ranged system. Besides having longer range than the RIM-24, the new missile was more accurate and reliable.

== New Threat Upgrade ==
Vessels of the California, and Virginia-class cruisers and the Kidd-class destroyers had their Tartar systems upgraded to modification 14 or 15 standard which enabled them to employ the Standard Missile 2 as part of the New Threat Upgrade (NTU) program. The New Threat Upgrade equipped vessels could utilize the inertial guidance systems on the SM-2 and time share illumination radars for semi-active homing in the terminal phase of the intercept, increasing the number of targets the Tartar system could attack at the same time. The New Threat Upgrade Tartar ships could function nearly as well as Aegis Combat System equipped vessels, except for dealing with saturation missile attacks. The NTU still requires the AN/SPG-51 radar to acquire a lock on the target and illuminate it just before intercept.

== See also ==
- Fire-control system
- RIM-66 Standard
