= French aircraft carrier Charles de Gaulle =

Flagship of the French Navy

Charles de Gaulle
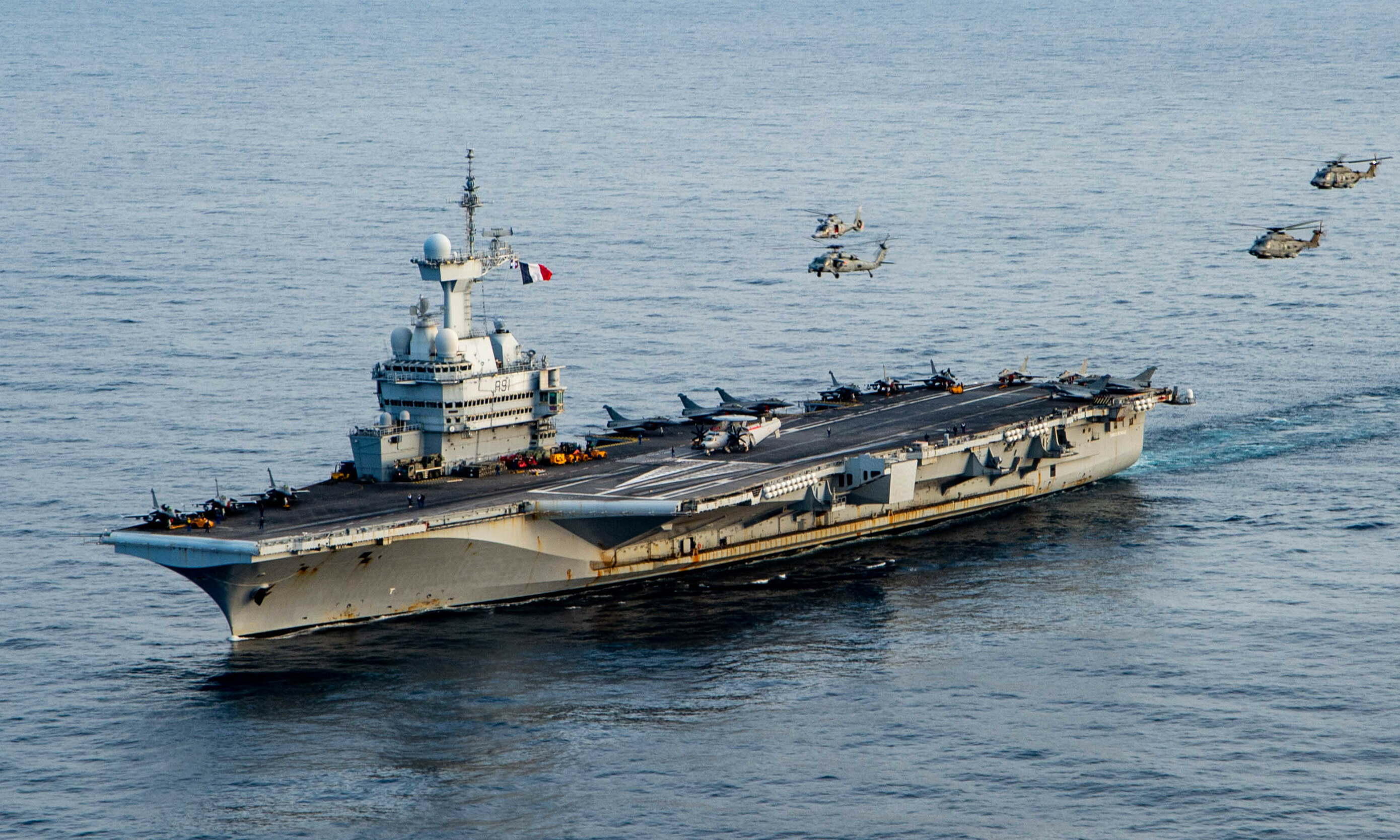
- Charles de Gaulle in 2022

Class overview
- Name: Charles de Gaulle class
- Builders: DCN, Arsenal de Brest
- Operators: French Navy
- Preceded by: Clemenceau class
- Succeeded by: PA2 (cancelled); PANG (planned)
- Cost: €3 billion (2001) (equivalent to €4.47 billion in 2025)
- Built: 1989–2000
- In commission: 2001–present
- Planned: 1
- Completed: 1

History

France
- Name: Charles de Gaulle
- Namesake: Charles de Gaulle
- Ordered: 3 February 1986
- Builder: Naval Group
- Laid down: 14 April 1989 (stacking of elements in prefabrication from 24 November 1987)
- Launched: 7 May 1994
- Maiden voyage: 18 May 2001
- Renamed: Ordered as Richelieu on 3 February 1986, renamed Charles de Gaulle 18 May 1987
- Home port: Toulon, France
- Identification: Pennant number: R91; MMSI number: 228711555
- Nickname(s): CDG
- Honours and awards: Jack with the colours of the Free French Forces (front) and the ribbon of the Ordre de la Libération (back)
- Status: in active service

General characteristics
- Type: Aircraft carrier
- Displacement: 42,500 t (41,800 long tons) (full load)
- Length: 261.5 m (857 ft 11 in) LOA
- Beam: Overall: 64.36 m (211 ft 2 in); Waterline: 31.5 m (103 ft 4 in)
- Height: 66.5 m (218 ft 2 in)
- Draught: 9.43 m (30 ft 11 in)
- Propulsion: 2 × Areva K15 pressurised water reactors (PWR), 150 MWt each, LEU < 20%; 2 × Alstom steam turbines with a total 61 MW (82,000 hp) shaft power; 4 × diesel-electric; 2 × shafts
- Speed: 27 knots (50 km/h; 31 mph)
- Range: Unlimited distance; 20–25 years
- Endurance: 45 days of food
- Capacity: 800 commandos, 500 t (490 long tons; 550 short tons) of ammunition
- Complement: Ship's company: 1,350; Air wing: 600
- Sensors & processing systems: DRBJ 11 B tridimensional air search radar; Thales SMART-S MK2 (replacing DRBJ 11B); DRBV 26D air search radar; DRBV 15C low altitude air search radar; Arabel target acquisition radar
- Electronic warfare & decoys: ARBR 21 Detector; ARBB 33 Countermeasures suite; ARBG2 MAIGRET Interceptor; 4 × Sagaie decoys launcher; SLAT (Système de lutte anti-torpille) torpedo countermeasures
- Armament: 4 × 8 cell A-43 Sylver launchers carrying the MBDA Aster 15 surface-to-air missile.; 2 × 6 cell Sadral launchers carrying Mistral short-range missiles; 20mm autocannons; 8 × Giat 20F2 20 mm cannons (original); 3 × Nexter Narwhal (since 2019)
- Aircraft carried: 30–40 aircraft, including; 30 Rafale M (standard); 2 E-2C Hawkeye; 2 NFH Caïman Marine; 1 AS565 Panther ISR; 2 AS365F Dauphin Pedro

Charles de Gaulle (R91; French: [ʃaʁl(ə) də ɡol]) is the flagship of the French Navy. Commissioned in 2001, the ship is the tenth French aircraft carrier, the first French nuclear-powered surface vessel, and the only nuclear-powered carrier completed outside of the United States Navy. It is named after French president and general Charles de Gaulle.

The ship carries a complement of Dassault Rafale M and E-2C Hawkeye aircraft, AS365F Dauphin Pedro, EC725 Caracal and AS532 Cougar helicopters for combat search and rescue, as well as modern electronics and Aster missiles. She is a CATOBAR-type carrier that uses two 75 m (246 ft) C13‑3 steam catapults of a shorter version of the catapult system installed on the US Nimitz-class aircraft carriers, one at the bow and one at the waist. As of March 2026, Charles de Gaulle and the Chinese aircraft carrier Fujian were the only non-American aircraft carriers equipped with catapult launch systems. The catapults on Charles de Gaulle allow it to operate F/A-18E/F Super Hornets and C-2 Greyhounds of the United States Navy.

== Development ==
=== Construction ===
The carrier replaced Foch, a conventionally powered aircraft carrier, in 2001. Clemenceau and Foch were completed in 1961 and 1963 respectively; the requirement for a replacement was identified in the mid-1970s.

The hull was laid down in April 1989 at the DCN Brest naval shipyard. The carrier was launched in May 1994 and at 42,000 tonnes (full load) was the largest warship launched in Western Europe since HMS Ark Royal in 1950. She was to be named Richelieu in 1986 by the French president at the time, François Mitterrand, after the famous French statesman Armand-Jean du Plessis, Cardinal Richelieu. (Note: Following the traditional name Richelieu for capital ships in the French Navy, previously the battleship Richelieu of the Second World War.) On 18 May 1987, the name of the ship was changed to Charles de Gaulle by the Gaullist Prime Minister Jacques Chirac.

Construction quickly fell behind schedule as the project was starved of funding, which was worsened by the economic recession in the early 1990s. Total costs for the vessel would top €3 billion. Work on the ship was suspended altogether on four occasions: 1990, 1991, 1993, and 1995. The ship was commissioned on 18 May 2001, five years behind the projected deadline.

In 1993, it was alleged by The Guardian that a group of engineers inspecting the vessel during her construction were British Secret Intelligence Service (MI6) operatives, believed to have been learning the method of shielding the nuclear reactors, amongst other technical details. The newspaper published a denial by both the British government and the Direction de la surveillance du territoire (DST) (in English: Directorate of Territorial Surveillance) that there had been any incident.

=== Trials and technical problems ===
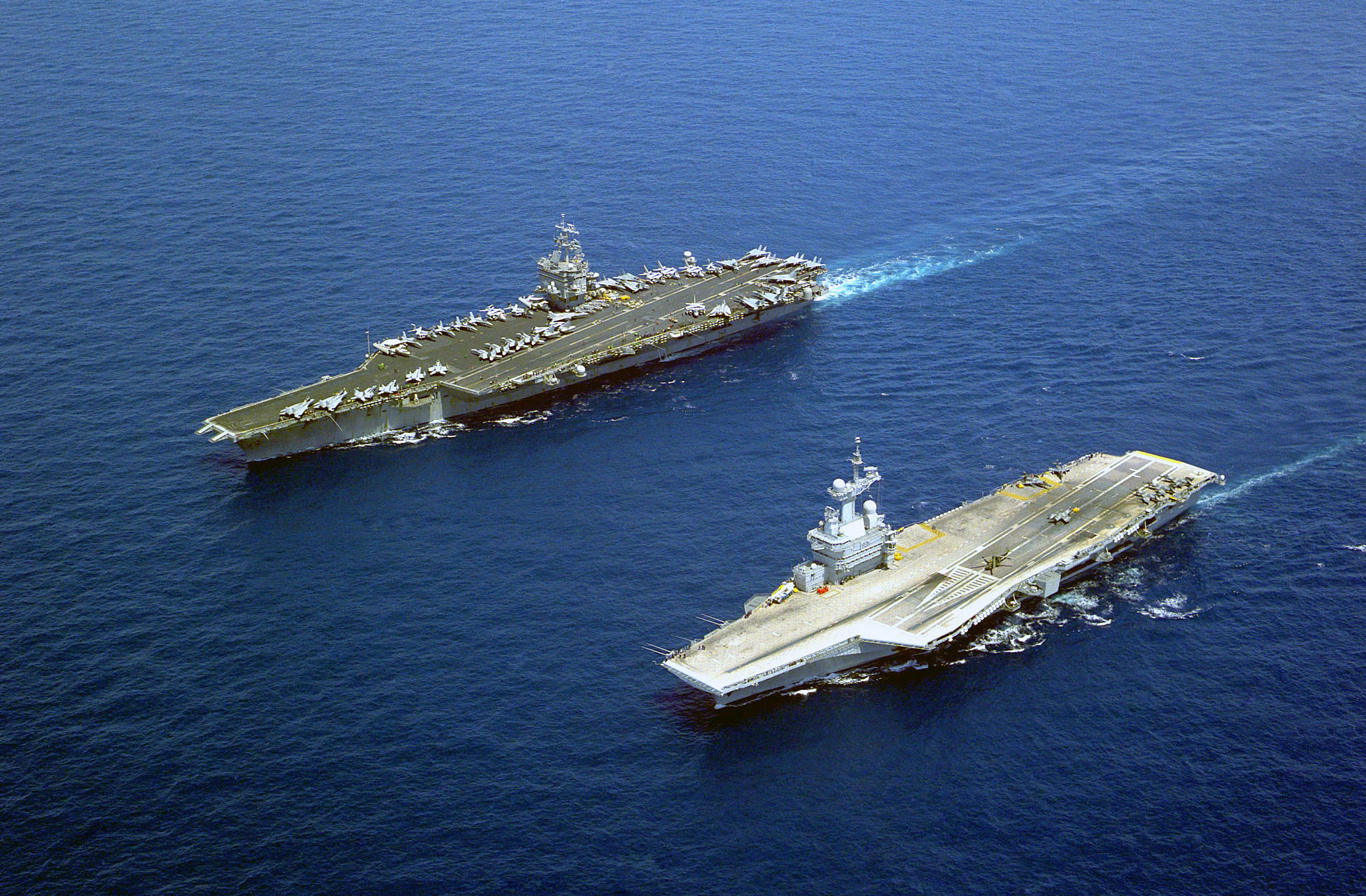
USS Enterprise (top), the first nuclear-powered aircraft carrier, and Charles de Gaulle (bottom), at that time the newest nuclear carrier, both steaming in the Mediterranean Sea on 16 May 2001.

Charles de Gaulle entered sea trials in 1999 which identified the need to extend the flight deck to safely operate the E-2C Hawkeye. This operation sparked negative publicity, as the same tests had been conducted on Foch and Clemenceau when the F-8E (FN) Crusader fighter had been introduced. The 5 million francs for the extension was 0.025% of the total budget for the Charles de Gaulle project.

The ship left Toulon for her fourteenth and final sea trial on 24 October 2000. During the night of 9–10 November, in the Western Atlantic while en route toward Norfolk, Virginia, the port propeller broke, and the ship had to return to Toulon to have a replacement fitted. Although the supplier, Atlantic Industrie, was not believed to have intentionally been at fault, it was nevertheless blamed for poor-quality construction. Not long after the French defence minister ordered an investigation on quality management, a fire destroyed the archives of the supplier. As a temporary solution, the less advanced spare propellers of Clemenceau were used, limiting the maximum speed to 25 knots (46 km/h; 29 mph) instead of the contractual 27 knots (50 km/h; 31 mph).

On 5 March 2001, Charles de Gaulle returned to sea with the ex-Clemenceau propellers and reached 25.2 knots (46.7 km/h; 29.0 mph) on her trials.

On 16 September 2001 the French press reported slightly higher than acceptable radioactivity levels aboard Charles de Gaulle, thought to be caused by a faulty isolation element. It was later discovered that the radioactivity levels matched the design, but that the regulations concerning acceptable radioactivity levels had changed. While the United States was preparing its response to the 11 September attacks in the form of Operation Enduring Freedom, French media complained about the lack of deployable French military power. At the same time, the Defence Commission reported the maintenance of the Fleet to be substandard. In this context, Charles de Gaulle, then under repairs, was again an object of criticism, with former President Valéry Giscard d'Estaing describing it as a "half-aircraft-carrier" and requesting the launching of the second carrier vessel (named PA2) to guarantee an availability rate of 100%.

=== Maintenance and upgrades ===
Charles de Gaulle's first major overhaul began in September 2007. The highlight of this 15-month refit was the refuelling of the nuclear power plant, a necessary step after six years in service, during which Charles de Gaulle sailed the equivalent of 12 times around the world, spent 900 days at sea, and performed 19,000 catapult launches. Several improvements were also made, including the installation of new propellers. These allow Charles de Gaulle to reach her design speed of 27 knots, replacing the propellers used since 2001. Aircraft maintenance and weapons stores were also upgraded to allow the operation of new Rafale F3 fighters armed with ASMP-A nuclear missiles and SCALP EG cruise missiles, and satellite communications bandwidth will be increased tenfold. This refit increased displacement to 42,500 tonnes and was completed in December 2008. After technical problems in March 2009, the carrier was back in Toulon for repairs. An intensive work-up period was planned to bring Charles de Gaulle and her air group back to operational status.

On 14 October 2010, a four-month cruise was cut down to a single day when the ship suffered an electrical fault in its propulsion system.

The aircraft carrier underwent an 18-month midlife upgrade and refit begun in February 2017 and returned to service in September 2018. The nuclear reactor was refuelled, standard maintenance was completed, and the ship's combat system was modernized, to better communicate with allies and support the Rafale fighters employed by the carrier.

== Operational service ==
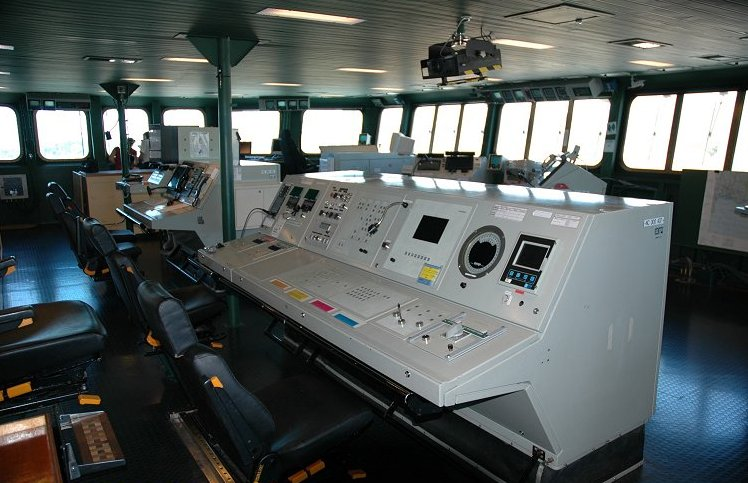
Command bridge of Charles de Gaulle

On 11 October 2001, the frigate Cassard, four AWACS aircraft and Charles de Gaulle were involved in a successful trial of the Link 16 high-bandwidth secure data network. The network allows real-time monitoring of the airspace from the south of England to the Mediterranean Sea. The collected data were also transmitted in real-time to the frigate Jean Bart through the older MIL-STD-6011 system.

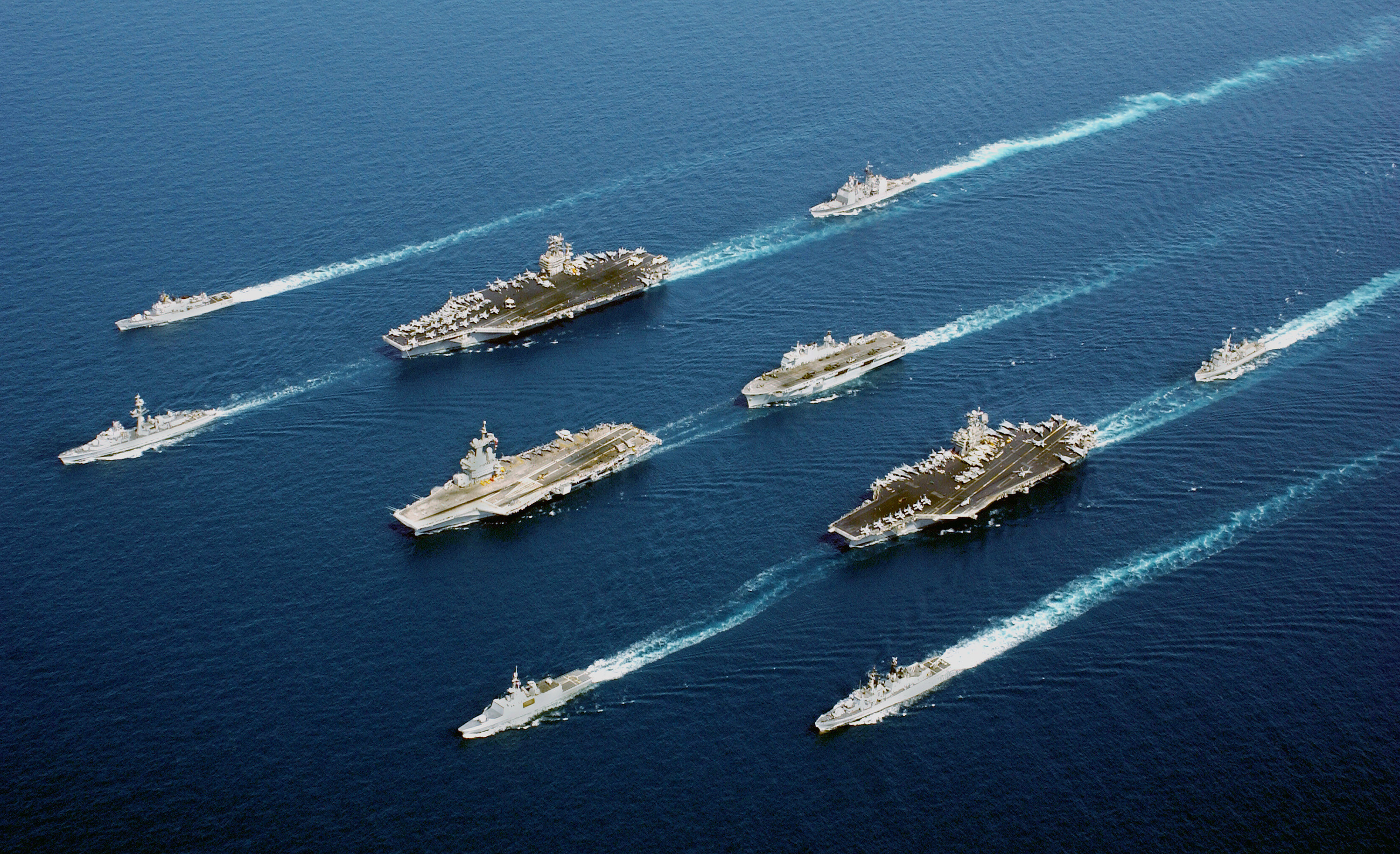
A rare occurrence of a 5-country multinational fleet of the NATO countries, the Netherlands, France, the United States, Italy, and the United Kingdom, during Operation Enduring Freedom in the Oman Sea

=== Afghanistan ===
On 21 November 2001, France sent Charles de Gaulle to the Indian Ocean in support of Operation Enduring Freedom against Taliban-controlled Afghanistan. Task Force 473, with 2,900 personnel under the command of Contre-Amiral François Cluzel, sailed on 1 December. The task force was composed of Charles de Gaulle, frigates Lamotte-Picquet, Jean de Vienne and Jean Bart, the nuclear attack submarine Rubis, the tanker Meuse and the D'Estienne d'Orves-class aviso Commandant Ducuing. Embarked air power comprised sixteen Super Étendards, one E-2C Hawkeye, two Rafale Ms, and several helicopters. The Super Étendards carried out their first missions above Afghanistan on 19 December, executing reconnaissance and bombing missions, covering over 3,000 kilometres (1,900 mi). Approximately 770 sorties were carried out from the carrier.

From February 2002, the air wings of Charles de Gaulle and USS John C. Stennis landed on each other's decks as a means of strengthening the ties between the allies. On 18 February 2002, a Helios observation satellite spotted abnormal activities near Gardez. The next day, after American Special Forces in the region confirmed these observations, Charles de Gaulle launched two reconnaissance Super Étendards. On 20 February 2002, British and US forces entered the valley and Operation Anaconda began in early March 2002. In March, Super Étendards and six land-based Mirage 2000 aircraft carried out airstrikes against targets claimed to be al Qaeda. A few targets suggested by US forces were denied out of fear of hitting civilians. French involvement was complimented on 11 March 2002 by US President George W. Bush, who mentioned "our good ally, France, has deployed nearly one-fourth of its navy to support Operation Enduring Freedom". At this point, the French air complement had been increased to 16 Super Étendards, 6 Mirage 2000 D, 5 Rafales, and 2 Hawkeye AWACS. On 2 May, Charles de Gaulle arrived in Singapore for relief, and returned to Oman on 18 May.

=== Indian-Pakistani crisis ===
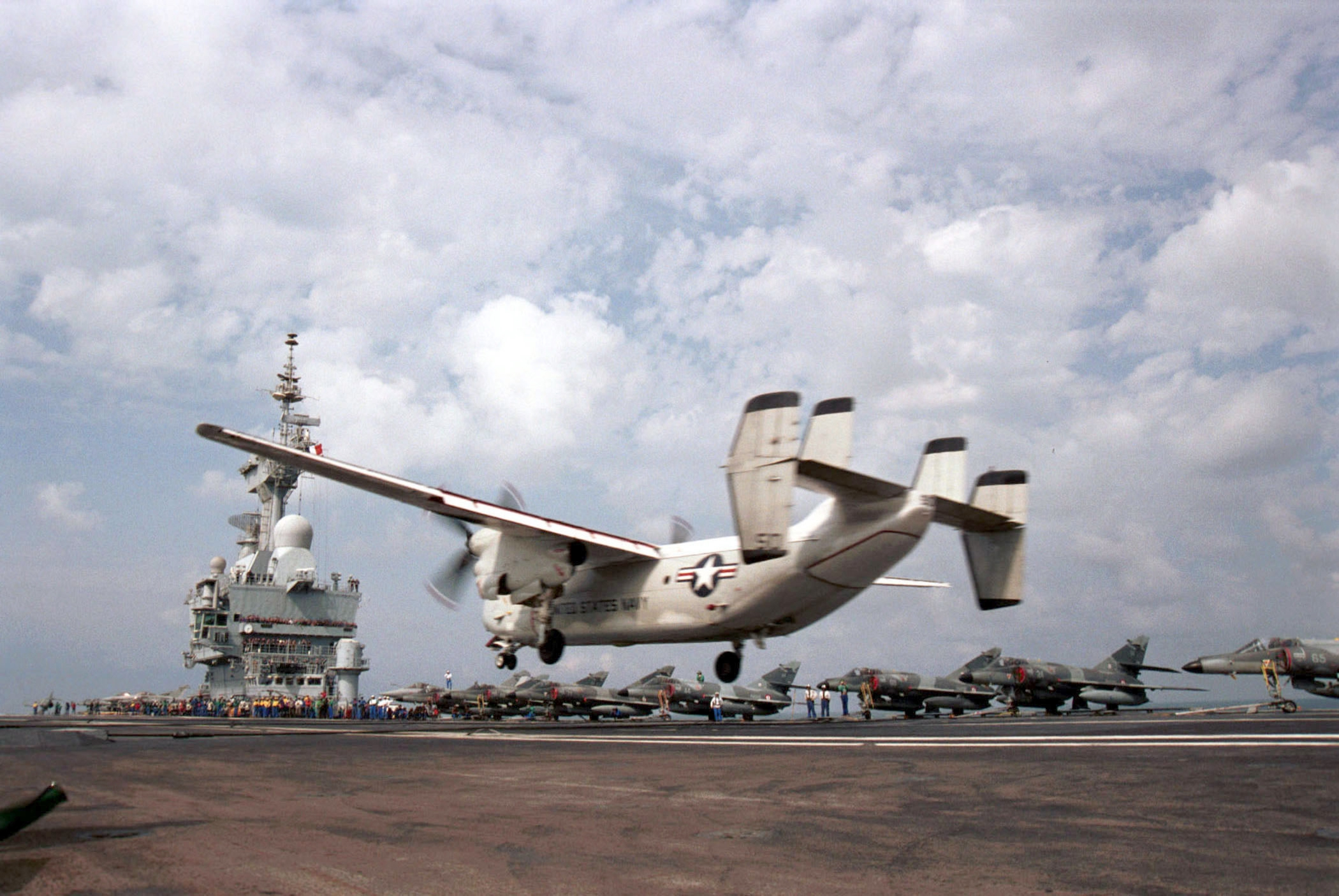
A C-2 Greyhound aircraft of the US Navy catches the wire aboard Charles de Gaulle in 2002.

In June 2002 while Charles de Gaulle was in the Arabian Sea, armed Rafale fighters conducted combat air patrols with the United States Navy off the coasts of India and Pakistan, marking a significant point in the Rafale M's operational career and its integration with the carrier.

=== Continuing operations ===
Charles de Gaulle participated in further actions as part of Operation Enduring Freedom in 2005. She returned to Southwest Asia in May 2006 and shortly after supported coalition efforts over Afghanistan. The aircraft carrier regularly participates in the annual bilateral naval exercises between the Indian and French navies called 'Varuna'.

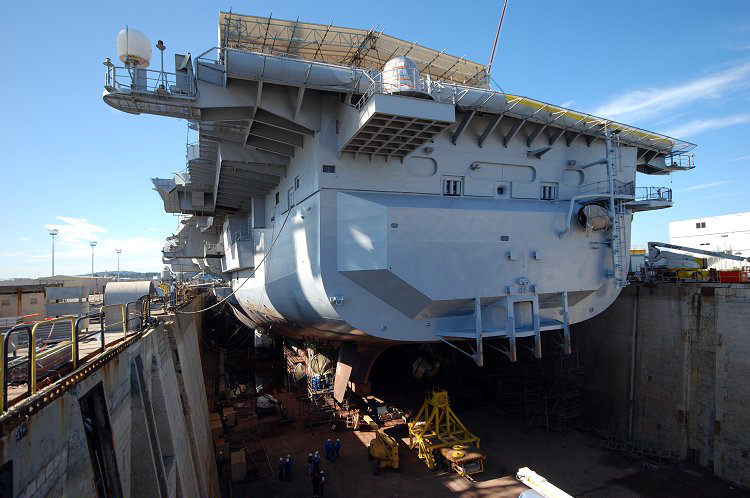
Charles de Gaulle refitting in the southwestern dock of Vauban industrial zone in 2008

=== Fifth overseas deployment: Task Force 473 and Operation Agapanthus 2010 ===
A French naval task group, designated Task Force 473, led by Charles de Gaulle departed Toulon on 30 October 2010 for a four-month deployment, code-named Operation Agapanthus 2010, to the Mediterranean Sea, Red Sea, Indian Ocean, and Persian Gulf. The task group also included the frigates Forbin and Tourville; the nuclear attack submarine Améthyste; the replenishment oiler Meuse, 3,000 sailors, and an Embarked Aviation Group (EAG) consisting of 12 Super Étendard attack aircraft, 10 Rafale multi-role fighters, and two E-2C Hawkeye 2000 AEW aircraft.

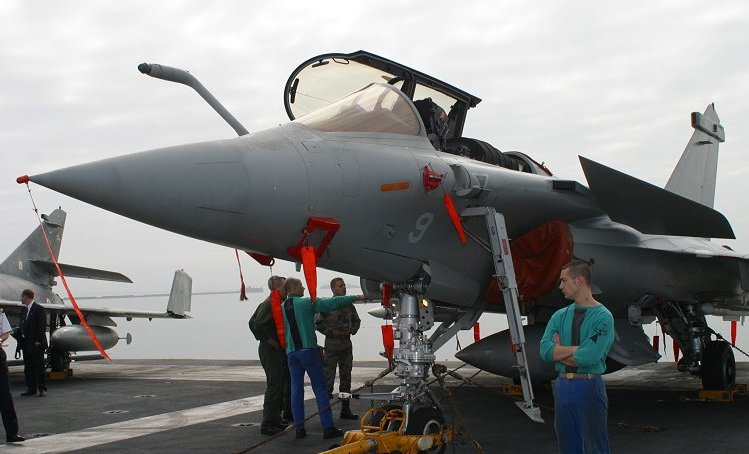
Rafale number 9 on the flight deck of Charles de Gaulle

On 28 November 2010, according to an Associated Press dispatch, the French Ministry of Defence announced that a French Rafale fighter jet crashed near Charles de Gaulle, which was operating 97 kilometres (60 mi) off the coast of Pakistan in the Arabian Sea in support of coalition forces in Afghanistan. The pilot parachuted to safety and was picked up by helicopter, and as of 2010, the cause of the crash was under investigation.

In December 2010, during its deployment to the Persian Gulf, the British Type 22 frigate Cumberland and the United States destroyer USS Halsey rotated from maritime security patrol to escort Charles de Gaulle in support of coalition military operations in Afghanistan. This represented an example of interoperability pursuant to the recently ratified Anglo-French defence cooperation treaty.

Between 7–14 January 2011, Task Force 473 participated in bilateral naval exercises, code-named Varuna 10, with the Indian Navy. Indian naval units participating in Varuna 10 included the aircraft carrier Viraat, the frigates Godavari and Ganga; and the diesel-electric submarine Shalki. Varuna 10 was a two-phase naval exercise, with the harbour phase taking place between 7–11 January and the sea phase between 11 and 14 January in the Arabian Sea. Task Force 473 paid a port visit to Goa between 7–14 January 2011. The carrier Charles de Gaulle and the frigate Forbin also paid a goodwill visit to Khor Fakkan, United Arab Emirates, on 30 January 2011, docking at its container terminal facilities.

Operation Agapanthus 2010 concluded on 21 February 2011. Task Force 473 completed more than 1,000 flying hours flown from Charles de Gaulle in support of NATO's International Security Assistance Force (ISAF) deployed in Afghanistan. Task Force 473 also participated in bilateral exercises with armed forces of India, Saudi Arabia, and the United Arab Emirates to test the interoperability of French military forces and share expertise with the regional partners.

=== 2011 Mediterranean operations ===
On 20 March 2011, Charles de Gaulle was deployed to the Mediterranean Sea to enforce United Nations Security Council Resolution 1973 which called for a no-fly zone over Libya. Accompanying Charles de Gaulle were the frigates Dupleix and Aconit and the fleet replenishment tanker Meuse.

During Unified Protector, the air fleet had flown 1,350 sorties during the intervention in Libya. Charles de Gaulle was then withdrawn for maintenance at Toulon on 10 August.

Following this deployment, Charles de Gaulle underwent maintenance and upkeep during an at-sea underway period in December 2011.

=== 2012 FANAL exercises ===
On 2 February 2012, Charles de Gaulle was underway for three days of sea trials. Beginning on 5 February 2012, carrier qualifications began for the pilots of its air group. This included transitioning of pilots flying Super Étendard Modernisé (SEM) strike fighters to the new Rafale M fighters.

On 16 March 2012, Charles de Gaulle departed for a one-month deployment to the Mediterranean Sea. Charles de Gaulle's task force was under the overall command of Rear Admiral Philippe Coindreau, and it consisted of the frigates Chevalier Paul, Dupleix, Montcalm, and Enseigne de vaisseau Jacoubert; the replenishment ship Meuse; and the nuclear-powered submarine Émeraude. Charles de Gaulle's embarked air group consisted of 7 Rafale fighters, 7 Super Étendards Modernisés (SEM) strike fighters, and 2 E-2C Hawkeye airborne early warning (AEW) aircraft. The highlight of the deployment for the task group was 2012 FANAL exercises that began on 5 April 2012 which also included land-based Atlantique 2 maritime patrol aircraft. 2012 FANAL concluded on 12 April, and this was the first major exercise involving the French Navy's new Caïman helicopter.

=== Operations against Islamic State ===
Chairman U.S. JCS General Martin Dempsey visits Charles de Gaulle, 2015

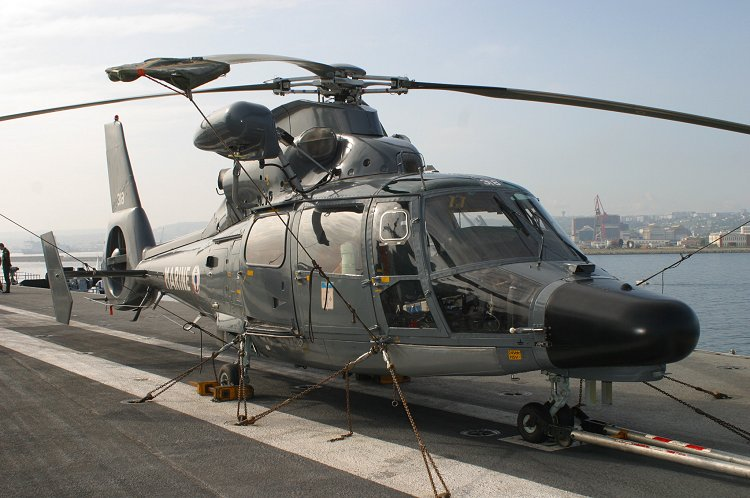
A Eurocopter Dauphin on the deck of Charles de Gaulle

In January 2015, Charles de Gaulle began being prepared for exercises in the Indian Ocean. In late February, the carrier and its battle group entered the Persian Gulf to participate in Opération Chammal against Islamic State militants in Iraq. France was the first country to join the American-led intervention and has 15 fighters, a patrol aircraft, and refuelling aircraft based on land in neighbouring countries. The addition of Charles de Gaulle added up to another 30 aircraft to France's commitment to operations. The carrier battle group arrived in the Persian Gulf on 15 February 2015 and began launching airstrikes on 22 February; this occurred seven weeks after the Charlie Hebdo attacks, as France vowed to be more responsive to jihadist terrorism. Sailing off the north coast of Bahrain, the carrier's 12 Rafale and 9 Super Étendard fighters could reach targets in half the time it would take French fighters based in the United Arab Emirates. Charles de Gaulle left the Persian Gulf in late-April 2015 after launching strike and surveillance missions against IS targets to participate in exercises with the Indian military; the carrier launched 10–15 sorties per day during its two-month deployment.

On 5 November 2015, France announced Charles de Gaulle would return to the area to conduct operations and the ship departed from its base at Toulon on 18 November. Although originally planned to redeploy to the Persian Gulf, the carrier and its strike group was re-routed to the Eastern Mediterranean Sea off the Syrian coastline, much closer to targets within Syria. Sources claimed Charles de Gaulle had a larger than normal air wing of 26 fighters consisting of 18 Rafales and 8 Super Étendards; the carrier had approximately 31–34 aircraft total (the official limit is 40 aircraft). The carrier began operations on 23 November 2015, ten days after the ISIL terrorist attacks in Paris. On 7 December, Rear Admiral René-Jean Crignola of the French Maritime Force, embarked in Charles de Gaulle, took command of U.S. Naval Forces Central Command's Task Force 50, leading coalition naval strike operations. He was the first non-American to do so. In June 2016, the United States Navy awarded the crew of Charles de Gaulle a Meritorious Unit Commendation for its accomplishments.

In late September 2016, Charles de Gaulle was deployed from Toulon to the Syrian coast for the Battle of Mosul. Its squadron of 24 Rafale M aircraft supported the international coalition against ISIL through airstrikes and reconnaissance missions.

In 2020, while continuing Opération Chammal in the Eastern Mediterranean, Charles de Gaulle was joined by the United States Navy Arleigh Burke-class destroyer Ross. They joined forces on Operation Inherent Resolve, an international coalition against the Daesh. Throughout the mission, the carrier strike group was joined by allied navy vessels from Germany, Belgium, Denmark, Greece, Spain, the Netherlands and Portugal. The cooperation illustrated common operational efficiency in the Mediterranean. During the operation, the Charles de Gaulle carrier group, its 2,000-member crew, a Durance-class tanker and a Hellenic Navy frigate docked at the Port of Limassol for a five-day port call. The President of Cyprus, Nicos Anastasiades, and ambassador Isabelle Dumont addressed the aircraft crew in the presence of Captain Guillaume Pinget.

=== Mission Clemenceau ===
The aircraft carrier led the carrier strike group Task Force 473 on a five-month long operation that began in March 2019, through the Mediterranean Sea. Aircraft from Charles de Gaulle participated in the last major combat against the Islamic State in the Battle of Baghuz Fawqani and then sailed for the Indian Ocean. Arriving in Singapore on 28 May, the aircraft carrier participated in a bilateral exercise with the Singapore Armed Forces.

=== COVID-19 pandemic ===
In April 2020, 40 crew members began to show symptoms of COVID-19, requiring Charles de Gaulle to return to her home port at Toulon earlier than planned, as reported on 8 April by the Ministry of Armed Forces. After 66 tests were conducted, the ministry announced on 10 April that 50 tests had returned positive. Three sailors were evacuated by helicopter to Saint Anne Army Teaching Hospital. On 19 April, The New York Times reported that 1,081 crew members in the carrier's naval group had tested positive, nearly all of which were on board Charles de Gaulle. The figure equated to nearly 60 percent of the carrier's total complement.

On 11 May 2020, Florence Parly reported to the National Assembly the conclusions of two investigations (Note: One investigation was epidemiological, while the other was of command.) into the outbreak on board the carrier, stating that the virus had first arrived before a stopover made in Brest, and that although the command and medical team aboard the carrier had "excessive confidence" (Note: The original words were "confiance excessive".) in their ability to deal with the virus, the investigations did not consider them at fault.

Parly further explained that the introduction of the virus on board the carrier happened sometime between when it left Limassol, Cyprus, on 26 February 2020, and when it arrived at Brest on 13 March 2020. During this time, personnel had been brought on board via air from either Cyprus, Sicily, the Balearic Islands, Spain, or Portugal. The spread of the virus was exacerbated by the stopover at Brest. Social distancing and other measures were taken after the stopover, but they weighed heavily on crew morale, so after enforcing the strict measures for a fortnight, they were relaxed, and a concert on board was authorized for 30 March 2020. Parly also noted that all soldiers aboard Charles de Gaulle have since recovered from the disease except for one sailor, who was still hospitalized after leaving the ICU. Later analysis by physicians at the Military Instruction Hospital Sainte Anne in Toulon found that 60% of Charles de Gaulle's 1,706 crewmembers were antibody-positive by the end of quarantine.

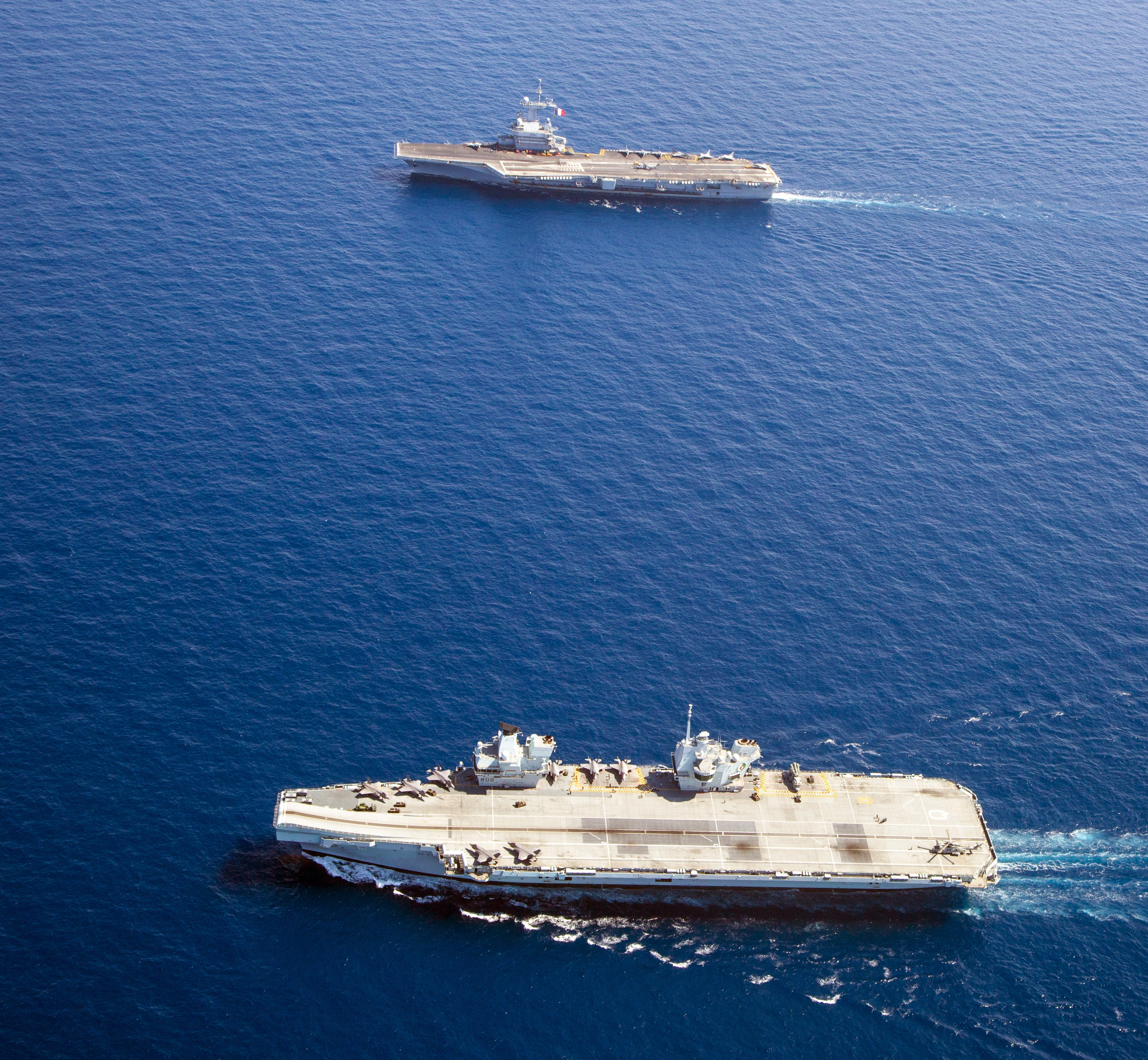
Charles de Gaulle (top) operating with HMS Queen Elizabeth in the Mediterranean Sea in 2021

=== Clemenceau 21 ===
Charles de Gaulle led the carrier strike group (CSG), as part of the "Clemenceau 21" mission, which set sail on 21 February 2021. The CSG deployed for several months to the Mediterranean Sea, then to the Indian Ocean and the Persian Gulf and returned to Toulon in June.

From 18 November to 2 December 2021, Charles de Gaulle took part in Exercise POLARIS 21 in the western Mediterranean Sea.

=== Clemenceau 22 ===
Charles de Gaulle set sail on 1 February, leading the French CSG to the Mediterranean as part of Clemenceau 22 from February to April 2022. This CSG consisted of one air defence frigate, Forbin; one air defence frigate, Alsace; one anti-submarine frigate, Normandie; one Rubis-class submarine; and one Durance-class replenishment oiler, Marne. The CSG was joined by other three other allies' ships and one submarine.

=== Clemenceau 25 ===
Charles de Gaulle departed on 28 November 2024 for Exercise Clemenceau 25. This deployment will see the carrier leading a carrier strike group comprising Forbin, a Horizon-class frigate, two Aquitaine-class frigates, (Alsace for air defence and an anti-submarine warfare frigate), a nuclear-powered attack submarine, the logistics support ship Jacques Chevallier, and two other support ships. For the exercise, the airwing consisted of two E-2C Hawkeye AEW aircraft, 24 Rafale Marine fighters and four helicopters.

On 4 January 2025, the Carrier Strike Group (CSG) centred on Charles de Gaulle (except Alsace and Forbin) arrived at Goa and docked in Mormugao Port Trust Jetty. On 5 January, Alsace and Forbin arrived at Kochi Port. The CSG stayed in India from 3 to 9 January. During this period, the Rafale M aircraft conducted an exercise with the Indian Air Force. Later, on its way of returning from the Pacific Ocean patrol, the CSG will re-visit India and is scheduled to participate in the 42nd edition of Varuna exercise with the Indian Navy.

INS Mormugao joined the CSG during their departure from India for the next phase of the mission in the Indian and Pacific oceans. The ships participated in joint navigational drills and Maritime Partnership Exercise. The drill included combat manoeuvres and cross-deck helicopter deployment with Forbin followed by replenishment by Jacques Chevallier. Simultaneously, Su-30MKI and Jaguar aircraft of the Indian Air Force also conducted joint anti-aircraft drills with the Rafale Ms of the French Navy.

On 15 January, two Atlantique 2 maritime patrol aircraft landed in Indonesia as part of the mission before exercise La Perouse 2025 after logistical stopovers in Greece, UAE and India (10 Jan). The aircraft traversed 7800 nautical miles and 30 flight hours to complement the CSG.

As part of the mission, the CSG also participated in the fourth edition of the multinational exercise La Perouse 2025. The exercise includes with multiple ships representing eight other navies like Australia (HMAS Hobart), India (INS Mumbai), United Kingdom (HMS Spey), United States (USS Savannah), Indonesia, Malaysia (KD Lekir, KD Gagah Samudera), Singapore (RSS Independence) and Canada (HMCS Ottawa). The exercise aims to "provide maritime safety with regional partners and multinational coalition assets in the 3 main straits detrimental to commercial shipping" and "sharing information and coordinating their actions against multiple threats thanks to the communication and coordination system IORIS". The exercise will be conducted in two phases. The first phase (16 to 20 January) focusing on Malacca and Sunda straits and the second one (21 to 24 January) focusing on Lombok Strait.

=== Iran and Strait of Hormuz crisis ===
On 3 March 2026, President Emmanuel Macron announced that the Charles de Gaulle carrier strike group would move from a location near Sweden in the Baltic Sea to the Middle East to defend allied bases during the Iran war, citing the drone strikes in Cyprus, an EU member and ally of France. The carrier strike group includes an attack submarine, a fleet oiler, the French frigate Chevalier Paul, the Spanish Navy frigate Cristóbal Colón, and the Royal Netherlands Navy frigate HNLMS Evertsen. Another French frigate, Languedoc, was also dispatched, and another, Forbin, was already present in the region for Operation Aspides. Charles de Gaulle arrived at Crete as of 9 March, where it was visited by Macron. He announced that France and other states will set up a naval mission to escort merchant ships through the Strait of Hormuz. He also said that Charles de Gaulle will be joined by eight frigates and two helicopter carriers in an "unprecedented" deployment of the French Navy.

The aircraft carrier was located to the northwest of Cyprus and 100 km (54 nmi) from the coast of Turkey. The ship's location was inadvertently leaked when an officer used the fitness app Strava to log his own runs aboard the ship.

As of May 2026, Charles de Gaulle had transitted the Suez Canal accompanied by Chevalier Paul, the frigate Alsace and the underway support ship Jacques Chevallier.

Charles de Gaulle returned back to Toulon on 11 July 2026, following her 5 1/2-month mission between the North Atlantic, Eastern Mediterranean and Arabian Gulf.

Charles de Gaulle will commence an 18-month refit in 2027 (ATM3), which will be conducted by Naval Group and managed by the Fleet Support Service (SSF). This is primarily to refuel the nuclear reactors, which is required every 10 years, and also to conduct essential maintenance and system upgrades. This will include a new Thales Group Sea Fire radar, the latest Setis 3.0 combat system from Naval Group, and upgrades to the Sylver A43 VLS. It will then take a further six months for the ship to be operational again once the refit has completed.

== Carrier air group ==
The carrier air group (le groupe aérien embarqué) operates three squadrons (11F, 12F, 17F) of fifteen Rafale M aircraft each, and one squadron (4F) of three E-2C Hawkeye aircraft:

- Flottille 11F
- Flottille 12F
- Flottille 17F
- Flottille 4F

Typically two Rafale squadrons are expected to rotate in the Charles de Gaulle carrier air group, and a pair of E-2Cs would supplement them. In peacetime, the number of aircraft on board may be lower: 30 (of 40 maximum) Rafale M, 2 E-2C Hawkeye, and 2 (of 4 maximum) AS365 Dauphin helicopters. Although 30 Rafales, divided into two squadrons, are expected to be on board, usually some aircraft remain in France for upgrade or training. US Navy F-18 Hornets and C-2 Greyhounds regularly conduct qualification arrested landings and catapult launches from Charles de Gaulle. In June 2011, two US Navy C-2A(R) Greyhounds were assigned to the French Navy to conduct operational carrier on-board delivery (COD) missions for Charles de Gaulle during the NATO intervention in Libya.

In 2019, Charles de Gaulle operated 35 aircraft during exercises, its record: 2 Dauphin helicopters, 30 Rafale M, 2 E-2C Hawkeye, and 1 NH90 NFH Caiman. In the event of war, the carrier is expected to operate close to its full complement of 40 aircraft. The air group took part in combat operations in Afghanistan, Syria, and Libya.

== French aircraft carrier procurement ==
The French Navy aimed to remain a two-carrier navy, mainly to ensure that at least one ship is operational at all times even when the other is under repair. This scheme required another aircraft carrier to be built, but Charles de Gaulle is the only aircraft carrier currently serving.

Cost considerations have made equipment standardization a necessity. In this context, there is a possibility of collaboration with Britain for future aircraft carriers. Thales UK (with BMT) made the design for the Queen Elizabeth-class aircraft carrier suitable for construction for France as the French aircraft carrier PA2. Both countries took steps to make such a scenario possible: The new carrier had to be conventionally propelled to meet the requirements of the Royal Navy. France favoured nuclear propulsion, and a study was conducted to see if it was more cost-efficient than gas turbines. The 2013 French Defence White Paper cancelled the plan for a second carrier.

Following completion of the midlife upgrade, in October 2018 the French armed forces minister announced an eighteen-month study to determine the requirements for a future carrier. In December 2020, President Macron announced that construction of the New Generation Aircraft Carrier (Porte-avions de nouvelle génération or PANG) would begin in around 2025 with sea trials to start in about 2036. The carrier is planned to have a displacement of around 75,000 tons and to carry about thirty-two next-generation fighters, two or three E-2D Advanced Hawkeyes, and a yet-to-be-determined number of unmanned carrier air vehicles. In March 2026, President Macron announced that the future carrier would be named France Libre after the Free France government-in-exile led by de Gaulle during World War II. Hull assembly is expected to begin in 2032, and commissioning is targeted for 2038.

== See also ==
- List of aircraft carriers
- List of naval ship classes in service
- Mistral-class amphibious assault ship
