= Opération Chammal =

French military operation

- Part of the War against the Islamic State
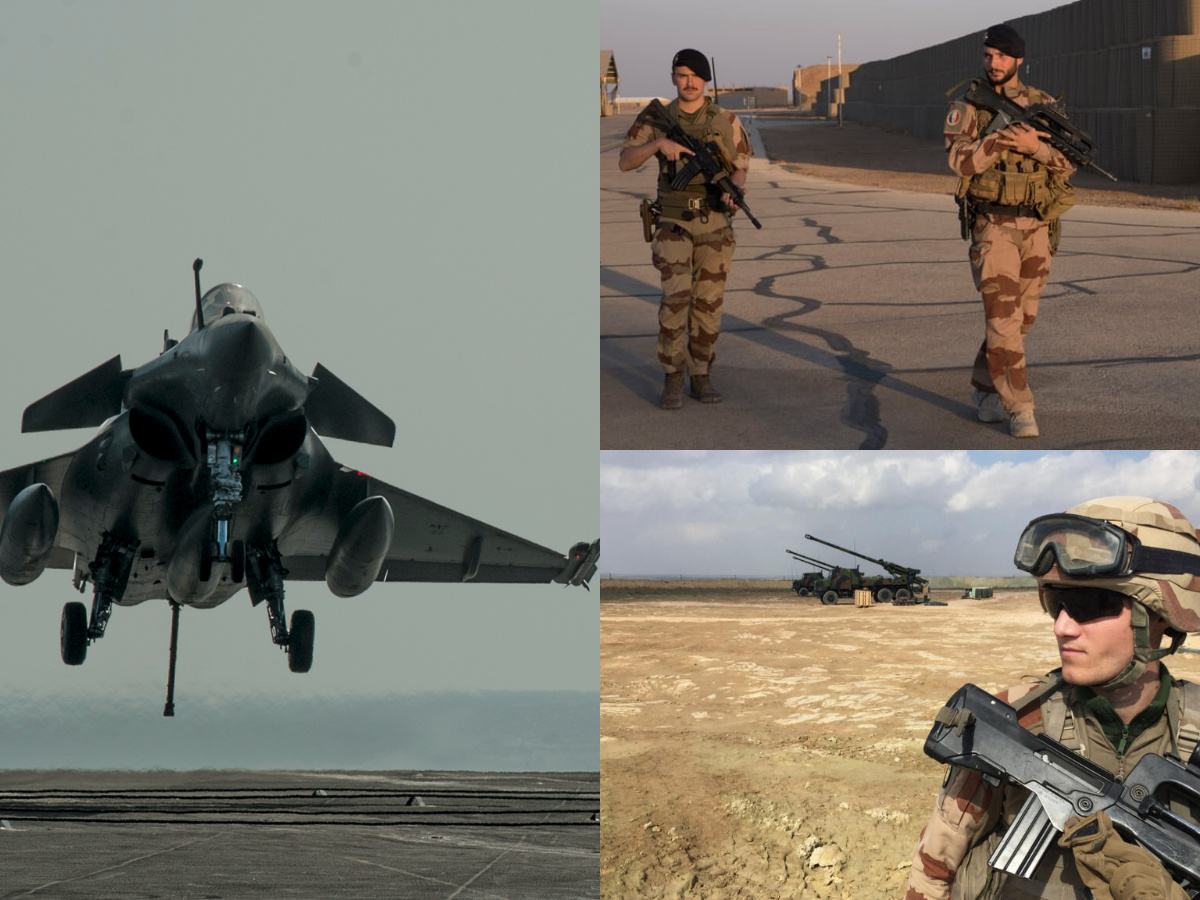
- French Dassault Rafale of Squadron 11F prepares to land on USS Carl Vinson. Carl Vinson is deployed as part of maritime security operations and strike operations in Iraq and Syria. French Soldier standing near artillery. Two French Soldiers patrolling in Jordan.
Date	19 September 2014 – ongoing (12 years, 1 month, 4 weeks and 2 days)
Location	Iraq, Syria
Status	Ongoing: French airstrikes on IS in Iraq and Syria; IS ground attacks on French special forces repelled; Complete military defeat of IS in Iraq on 9 Dec 2017

Belligerents
France	Islamic State

Commanders and leaders
(France) Emmanuel Macron (President 2017–present) (France) Sébastien Lecornu (Prime Minister 2025-present); Catherine Vautrin (Minister of the Armed Forces 2025–present); Fabien Mandon (Chief of the Defence Staff 2025–present); Jacques Langlade de Montgros (Chief of the Army Staff 2026–present); Christophe Cluzel (Chief of the Naval Staff 2026–present); Jérôme Bellanger (Chief of the Air and Space Force Staff 2024–present) Former: (France) François Hollande; (France) Manuel Valls; (France) Édouard Philippe; (France) Jean Castex; (France) Élisabeth Borne; (France) Gabriel Attal; (France) Michel Barnier; (France) François Bayrou; Jean-Yves Le Drian; Sylvie Goulard; Florence Parly; Pierre de Villiers; François Lecointre; Jean-Pierre Bosser; Thierry Burkhard; Bernard Rogel; Christophe Prazuck; Pierre Vandier; Denis Mercier; André Lanata; Philippe Lavigne	Abu Hafs al-Hashimi al-Qurashi (Leader of IS); Abu al-Hussein al-Husseini al-Qurashi †; Abu al-Hasan al-Hashimi al-Qurashi †; Abu Ibrahim al-Hashimi al-Qurashi †; Abu Bakr al-Baghdadi †; Abu Ali al-Anbari †; Abu Omar al-Shishani †; Abu Waheeb †

Units involved
French Air and Space Force; Commando Parachutiste de l'Air n° 10; French Navy; French Army; 13e Régiment de Dragons Parachutistes; 7th Battalion, Chasseurs Alpins	Military of the Islamic State

Strength
1 aircraft carrier (FS Charles de Gaulle); 2 air defence warships (FS Jean Bart, and FS Chevalier Paul); 30 Dassault Rafale fighters; 6 Mirage 2000D Fighter-bombers; 9 Super-Étendard Strike fighters (until 2016); 1 E-2 Hawkeye; 1 Breguet Atlantic; 1 E3F AWACS; 4 CAESAR self-propelled howitzer; 3,200 troops (special forces operators included)	Between 9,000 and 18,000 (U.S. intelligence estimate, January 2015); Between 20,000 and 31,500 (CIA estimate, September 2014)

Casualties and losses
7 killed	Over 2,500 IS fighters killed by French forces between September 2014 and December 2016 (reports on casualties from 2017 onwards are scarce); Unknown wounded; Over 2,000 targets (IS bases, weapons and ammunition depots, infrastructures...) destroyed by French air strikes between August 2014 and May 2017

Crest of Opération Chammal

Opération Chammal is a French military operation in Iraq and Syria launched to help curtail the expansion of the Islamic State and to support the Iraqi Army. Its name comes from the Shamal (Chammal in French), a northwesterly wind that blows over Iraq and the Persian Gulf states.

Airstrikes in Iraq began on 19 September 2014 and airstrikes in Syria by the end of September 2015. The French operation was at first limited to airstrikes and French president François Hollande had stated no ground troops would be deployed in the conflict. Additionally, the French frigate Jean Bart joined the United States Navy's Commander Task Force 50 (CTF 50) as an escort.

On 14 November 2015, ISIS claimed that the terrorist attacks that took place in Paris the previous day were retaliation for Opération Chammal. In response, France decided to expand the scope of its operations against the Islamist group, leading to significant assets being deployed.

== Background ==
On 10 June 2014, the terrorist group of the Islamic State of Iraq and the Levant and several other Sunni insurgents took control of the second-most populous city of Iraq, Mosul. After fighting the Iraqi Army, ISIL seized cities and committed massacres and other atrocities.

ISIL committed mass murder and other atrocities against the Assyrians, as well as the Yazidis. ISIL also carried out the Camp Speicher massacre in June 2014, killing thousands of people. Until August, ISIL had controlled almost one-third of Iraq.

On 7 August 2014, U.S. President Barack Obama authorized airstrikes in Iraq. The next day, the U.S. Air Force launched airstrikes targeting the ISIS fighters, with humanitarian aid support from the United Kingdom and France. On 10 September 2014, Obama outlined plans to expand U.S. operations to Syria.

== French authorities' statements leading up to France attacking ISIL ==
In September 2014, the French president and his ministers alluded to possible French military action against ISIL:

In Iraq and especially in Syria, the Daech terrorist organisation, which claims to be an Islamic state, succeeds in a degree never witnessed before to master a trans-border territory, to organize itself, to finance, and to equip itself. It has already made the world witness barbaric acts. Daily, it terrorises whole populations. It destabilizes a region which is already very fragile and its ambition is to build a terrorist state in the neighbourhood of Europe. (in French) En Irak et en Syrie en particulier, l'organisation terroriste Daesh, qui se prétend État islamique, atteint des degrés de maîtrise territoriale transfrontalière, d'organisation, de capacité financière et d'équipement encore jamais vus. Elle a déjà pris le monde à témoin d'actes barbares. Au quotidien, elle terrorise des populations entières. Elle déstabilise une région déjà très fragilisée et ambitionne de constituer un État terroriste dans le voisinage de l'Europe.

— French Defence Minister Jean-Yves Le Drian's closing speech at de Université d'été de la défense, 9 September 2014, in Bordeaux

The determination of the cutthroats from Daech (ISIL) is strong, ours must be even stronger. (in French) La détermination des égorgeurs de Daesh (acronyme de l'État islamique en arabe) est forte, la nôtre doit l'être plus encore.

— Foreign Minister Laurent Fabius, speech in the French National Assembly on 10 September 2014

There is no time to lose against the threat of Daech (ISIL) jihadists who now control large parts of Iraqi and Syrian territories, committing more and more extortions. (in French) Il n'y a pas de temps à perdre face à la menace des djihadistes de Daech qui a pris le contrôle de larges secteurs des territoires irakien et syrien, multipliant les exactions

— French President François Hollande, opening speech at the International Conference on Peace and Security in Iraq meeting at the Quai d'Orsay, 15 September 2014

It is also France's security that is threatened by this… pseudo-Islamic State.

— Defence Minister Le Drian, around 15 September

France has taken its responsibilities (…) I've been to Iraq to meet with the Iraqi authorities. They've asked me just one thing: French support for aerial operations. (…) I’ve decided to respond to that Iraqi demand (…) I affirm the need for that aerial support. There will be no other support, no troops on the ground, and we shall intervene nowhere except in Iraq.

— President Hollande, on 18 September

The French government considered that international legitimacy was provided by 15 August 2014 resolution 2170 from the United Nations Security Council.

== Air strikes on Iraq ==
On 18 September 2014, the United States secretary of state, John Kerry, announced in front of the United States House Committee on Foreign Affairs in the United States House of Representatives that President François Hollande had announced that he authorized airstrikes in Iraq, in response to a request by the Iraqi government.

On 19 September, the French Air Force carried out their first airstrike using two Rafale jets armed with GBU-12 Paveway II bombs, beginning the French intervention. It conducted the airstrikes on an ISIS depot in Mosul, dropping 4 GBU-12 bombs. Hollande's office said that the ISIS depot that was targeted was hit and completely destroyed. The airstrikes killed 75 fighters from the Islamic State. A spokesman of the Iraqi military, Qassim al-Moussawi, stated that four French airstrikes had hit the town of Zumar, killing dozens of militants.

On 21 September, two Rafale jets provided air support for the Iraqi Army near Baghdad in a reconnaissance mission. A day after, France conducted another reconnaissance mission over Mosul with two Rafale jets. Another reconnaissance mission conducted on 23 September. On 24 September, two reconnaissance and dynamic targeting missions were conducted in Mosul and Baghdad, supporting the Iraqi forces.

On 25 September, while in a reconnaissance mission, two Rafale jets conducted France's second airstrike after the jets received information about targets near them by the Coordination air operation center, a day after the beheading of the French hostage, Hervé Gourdel, by the Jund al-Khilafah terrorist group in Algeria. Stéphane Le Foll said "This morning [France] carried out airstrikes on the territory of Iraq." The jets destroyed 4 warehouses of ISIL near Fallujah. French/American jets conducted airstrikes at night in Kirkuk, killing 15 ISIL fighters and injuring 30.

Two reconnaissance missions were conducted by two Rafale jets and an Atlantique 2 over Nineveh Governorate on 26 September.

In November 2014, the strike force was augmented with 6 Dassault Mirage 2000Ds based in Jordan.

Between 18 December 2014 and 7 January 2015, French aircraft performed 45 missions in total. Rafales and Mirages performed 30 of those missions neutralising ten targets.

On 14 January 2015, François Hollande declared that the aircraft carrier Charles de Gaulle would deploy to the Persian Gulf with its strike group and that it was capable of supporting airstrikes against ISIL. The ship was deployed in November and France launched its first airstrikes from the carrier on 23 November.

== Air strikes on Syria and Iraq ==
From the end of September 2015, France began airstrikes on ISIL in Syria as well, on a small scale to avoid inadvertently strengthening the hand of president Bashar Assad by hitting his enemies.

French aircraft hit targets in Syria in early October 2015. In November, French Prime Minister Manuel Valls told reporters in Amman, "Terrorist attacks have taken place (in France) ... In the name of self-defence it is obligatory to strike Daesh and we will continue," and "Whether there are French (citizens) among them, it's possible, but we have a responsibility to hit Daesh. Terrorists do not have passports."

On 14 November 2015, ISIL claimed that the 13 November 2015 Paris terrorist attacks were retaliation for Opération Chammal. In response, the French forces increased their attacks. On 15 November 2015, the French Air Force launched its largest airstrike of the bombing campaign sending 12 planes, including 10 fighters, that dropped 20 bombs in training camps and ammunition facilities in Raqqa, Syria, the de facto capital of ISIL. The UK offered support with air-to-air refuelling and use of its Cyprus air base at RAF Akrotiri. Germany also intervened in response to the Paris attacks and assisted France by sending a frigate and Panavia Tornado reconnaissance aircraft to Turkey.

On 17 January 2019, French president Emmanuel Macron said that the Trump administration's planned withdrawal "should not deflect us from our strategic objective to eradicate Daesh" and vowed to keep French soldiers in Syria throughout 2019.

Following the fall of the Assad regime in December 2024, the French Air Force conducted airstrikes against several Islamic State targets in Syria.

On 3 January 2026, French and British aircraft carried out a joint precision strike on an underground Islamic State weapons facility near Palmyra in central Syria.

== Battle of Mosul (2016) ==
France is part of the 60-nation strong international coalition supporting Iraqi forces to reclaim the city of Mosul, which fell to ISIL in 2014. The French army deployed four CAESAR howitzers and 150 to 200 soldiers at Qayyarah Airfield West, with 600 more French troops announced at the end of September. An additional 150 French soldiers were in Erbil, east of Mosul, training Peshmerga. At the end of September 2016, the Charles de Gaulle was deployed from Toulon to the Syrian coast to support the operation against ISIL through airstrikes and reconnaissance missions. France has 36 Rafale M jets in the mission, with 24 based on the Charles de Gaulle and 12 operating out of French Air Force bases in Jordan and the United Arab Emirates.

== Operations in Libya ==
During February 2016, it was widely reported that French Special Forces were operating in Libya, alongside similar teams from the United Kingdom and the United States.

== Military bases ==
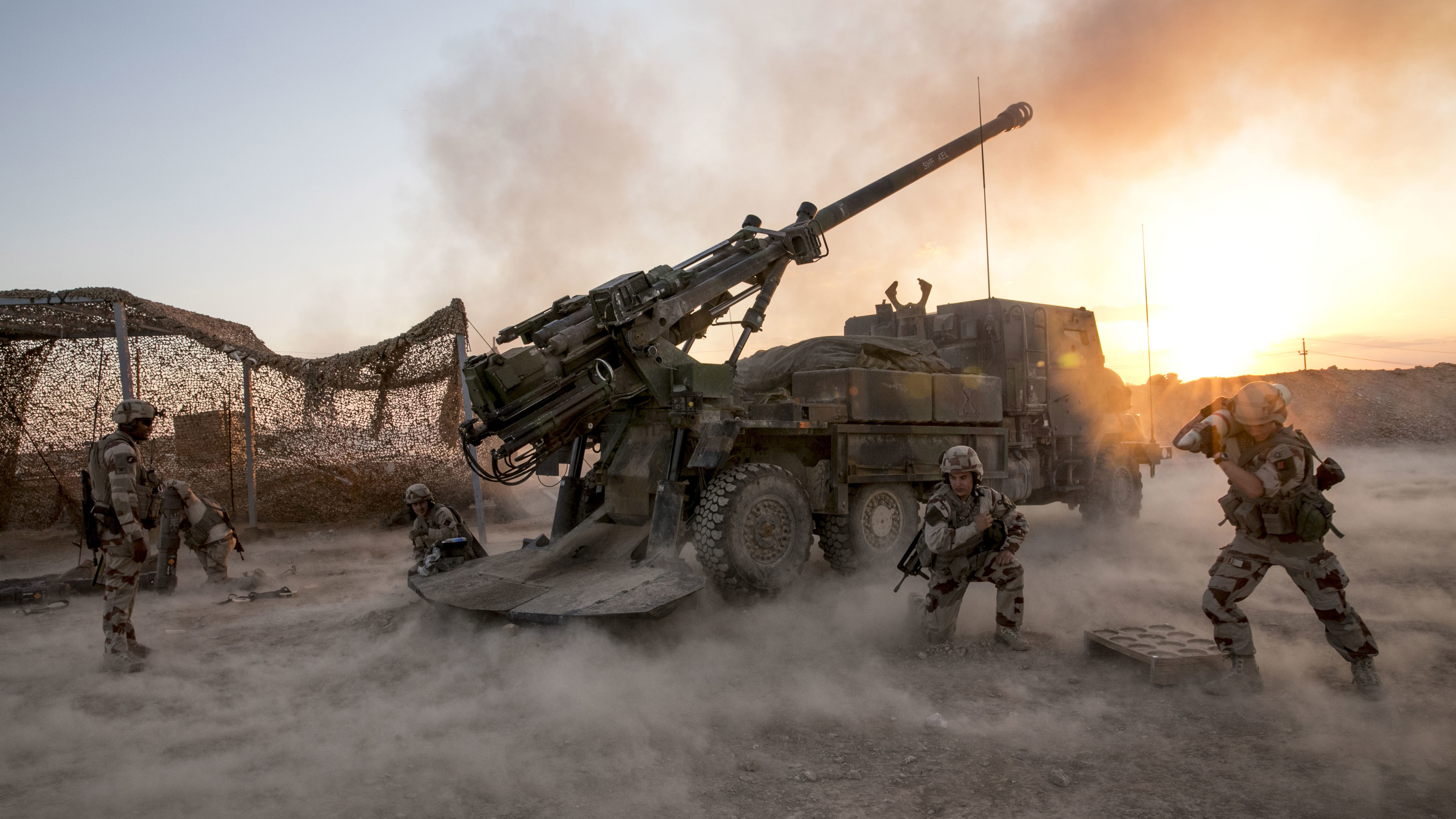
CAESAR artillerymen, attached to Task Force Wagram, supporting Operation Roundup from al-Qa'im, Iraq, May 2018

In 2018, the Lafarge cement plant located south of Kobanî, Syria, was being used as a base of operations by the 1st Marine Infantry Parachute Regiment and United States Army forces.

During the operation, there were at least three bases near Kobanî, Sarrin and Ayn Issa. Moreover, French and American soldiers were reportedly spotted patrolling downtown Manbij, Syria.

== Casualties ==
On 23 September 2017, an operator from the 13th Parachute Dragoon Regiment, Adjudant-chef Stéphane Grenier, became France's first soldier to be killed in combat during Operation Chammal. And on 21 March 2018, a legionnaire from the 2nd Foreign Infantry Regiment, Caporal Bogusz Pochylski, became the second soldier to lose his life.

== Assets ==
- Navy
  - Task Force 50 centered around the aircraft carrier Charles de Gaulle with 18 Dassault Rafale fighters, 8 Dassault-Breguet Super Étendard strike aircraft and 2 Northrop Grumman E-2C Hawkeye AEW&C aircraft
    - Georges Leygues-class frigate La Motte-Picquet
    - Horizon-class frigate Chevalier Paul
    - Rubis-class submarine
    - Durance-class tanker Marne
      - Between February and 17 April 2015.
      - From 23 November 2015 to the present day.
  - Cassard-class frigate Jean Bart
    - Between 20 October 2014 and 30 January 2015.
  - La Fayette-class frigate Courbet
    - 26 November 2015 – present.
- Air Force
  - BA104 Al Dhafra, United Arab Emirates
    - 6 Dassault Rafale fighters
    - 1 Dassault Atlantique 2 maritime patrol aircraft
    - 1 Boeing C-135FR Stratotanker aerial refueling tanker
  - Azraq Air Base – Jordan
    - 3 Dassault Mirage 2000D fighters
    - 3 Dassault Mirage 2000N fighters
  - 1 Boeing E-3F Sentry AEW&C aircraft

== See also ==
- American-led intervention in Iraq
- American-led intervention in Syria
- Battle of Sinjar
- Battle for Mosul Dam
- Persecution of Yazidis by the Islamic State
- War against the Islamic State
- Operation Okra – Australian operation against ISIL
- Operation Impact – Canadian operation against ISIL
- Operation Shader – UK operation against ISIL
- Operation Inherent Resolve – US operation against ISIL
