= 2013 French White Paper on Defence and National Security =

The 2013 French White Paper on Defense and National Security is the most recent defence reform of the French Armed Forces and the fourth ever defence white paper in French history. It was released on the 29 April 2013. The white paper reaffirmed France's commitment to NATO, the security of the European Union as well as its enhanced defence-relationship with the United Kingdom after the 2010 Lancaster House treaties on defence and security co-operation.

== Summary ==
- Additional cuts of 24,000 personnel on top of the 54,000 already cut in the 2008 French White Paper on Defence and National Security.
- Core defence budget frozen at 31.4 billion euros and reduced to 1.5% of GDP. However, the defence budget will continue to remain the third largest in NATO after the United States and United Kingdom.
- A "Joint Reaction Force" of 2,300 personnel maintained a high readiness and the ability to deploy up-to 15,000 troops in a single overseas deployment.
- Particular emphasis on developing intelligence gathering capabilities, cyber warfare, the strengthening of special forces and the purchase of unmanned aerial vehicles (UAVs).
- Number of ships, helicopters, transport aircraft and tanks to be reduced.

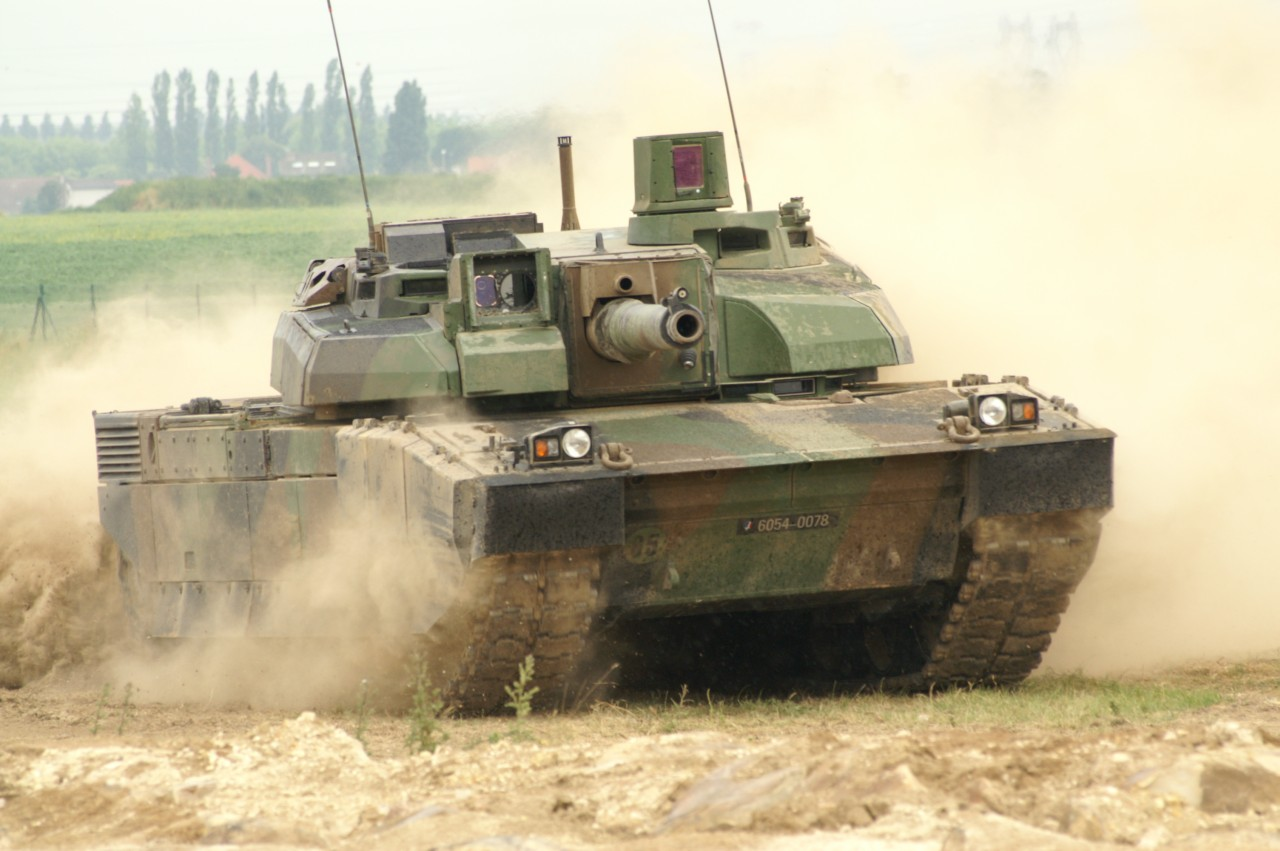
Leclerc Main Battle Tank.

=== French Army ===
- Reduction in personnel to the "operational force" of the army from 88,000 troops to 66,000.
- The French Army will restructure to 7 Brigades; 2 heavy, 3 medium and 2 light role.
- A reduction of 50 Leclerc main battle tanks to an operational fleet of 200.
- 80 attack helicopters, 115 support helicopters, 40 reconnaissance helicopters.
- Purchase of 30 "tactical" UAVs, most likely the British Watchkeeper WK450.

=== French Navy ===
- The possibility of a new aircraft carrier has been officially abandoned.
- The possibility of a 4th Mistral-class amphibious assault ship has been officially abandoned.
- The 5 La Fayette-class light frigates which were re-classified as "1st rank frigates" in the 2008 white paper will be upgraded with a sonar.
- A reduction in the number of "1st rank frigates" from 18 to 15. The figure of 15 includes "less powerful combatants" such as the La Fayette-class.
- Expected deliveries of FREMM multipurpose frigates to the French Navy reduced from 11 to 8.
- The two Horizon-class frigates will be the two primary air-defence frigates in service with the Navy when the ageing Cassard-class are decommissioned. However, the possibility remains that out of the 8 FREMM destined for the French Navy, 2 could be configured with enhanced air-defence capabilities (i.e. the FREDA derivative).
- 6 light surveillance frigates to remain in service (the Floréal-class).
- A total of 15 offshore patrol vessels.
- The construction of 6 Barracuda-class submarines.
- The last of the Foudre-class landing platform docks (L9012 Siroco) to be decommissioned.
- The white paper asserted that a naval task group would require "collaboration" with the Royal Navy to sustain operations. Bringing the Lancaster House treaties into practice.

=== French Air Force ===
- The air force and navy will operate no more than 225 fast-jet combat aircraft (reduced from 300) consisting of; Dassault Rafale multi-role fighters and modernised Mirage 2000-D strike aircraft.
- The Mirage 2000-N nuclear strike force will remain.
- The number of expected Dassault Rafale orders will be reduced.
- Ability to deploy up to 40 fast-jet combat aircraft in an overseas conflict.
- 4 air force and 3 navy AEW&C systems.
- A fleet of refueling tanker and transports aircraft comprising; 12 Airbus A330 refueling tankers (reduced from 14) and 50 tactical transport aircraft (reduced from 70).
