= French aircraft carrier PA2 =

Proposed French aircraft carrier

PA2
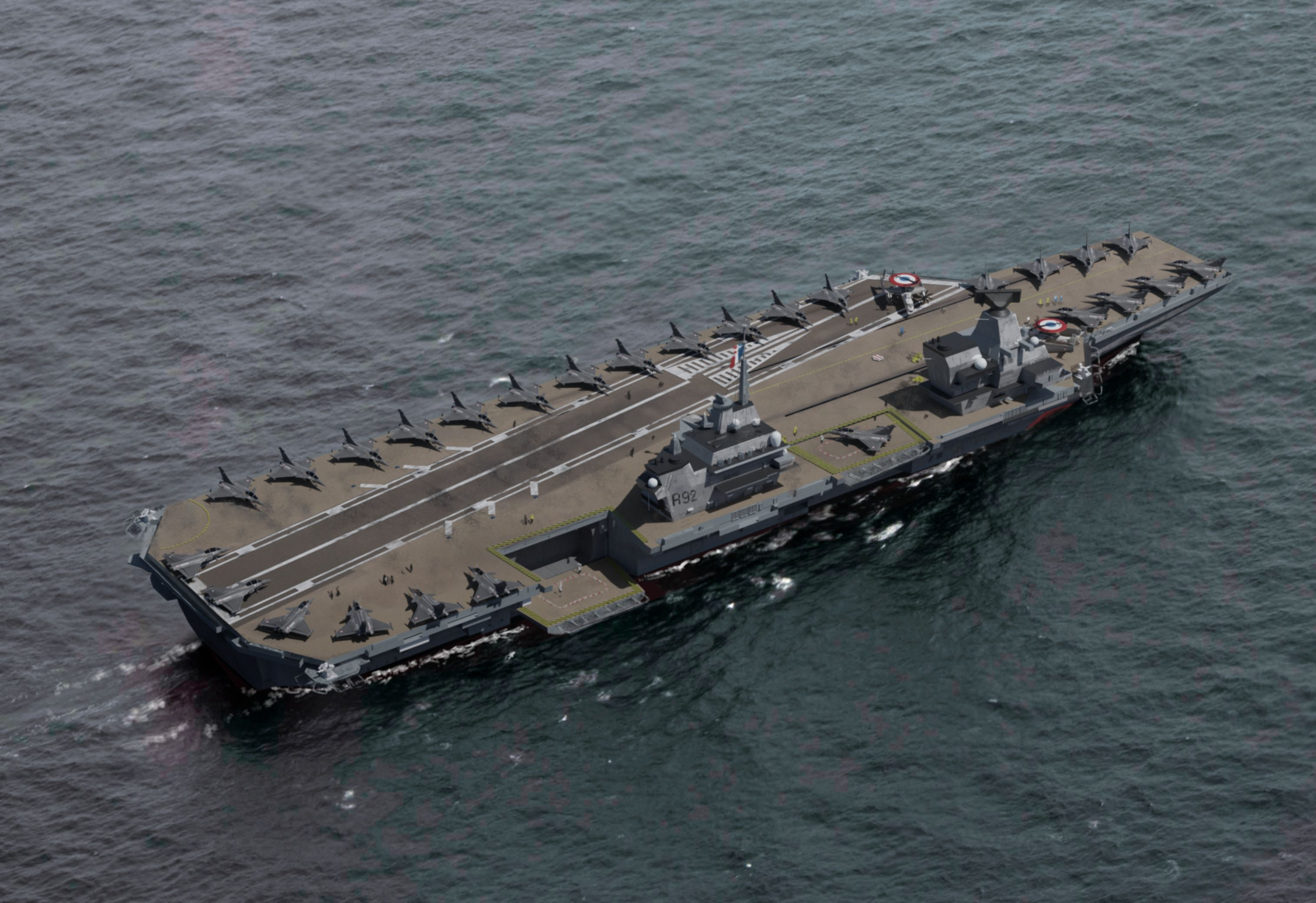
- A 2006 design of the PA2

Class overview
- Name: PA2 class
- Operators: French Navy
- Preceded by: Charles de Gaulle
- Succeeded by: France Libre
- Planned: 1
- Canceled: 1

History

France
- Fate: Cancelled in 2013

General characteristics
- Type: Aircraft carrier
- Displacement: 75,000 t (74,000 long tons)
- Length: 283 m (928 ft 6 in) overall
- Beam: 73 m (239 ft 6 in) overall
- Draft: 11.5 m (37 ft 9 in)
- Propulsion: 2 × RR MT-30 gas turbines; 4 × diesel-electric engines; two shafts
- Speed: 26 knots (48 km/h)
- Range: 10,000 nautical miles (19,000 km) at 15 knots (28 km/h)
- Complement: Ship's company: 1,000; Air wing: 650
- Sensors & processing systems: Héracles air search and target acquisition radar
- Armament: A 16-cell Sylver Vertical Launching System with Aster 15 missiles; A single 20 mm modèle F2 gun
- Aircraft carried: 40 aircraft, including: Rafale; E-2 Hawkeye; NH-90

PA2 (French: Porte-Avions 2, "Aircraft Carrier 2") was a planned aircraft carrier under development by Thales Naval France and DCNS for the French Navy. The design was based on the Queen Elizabeth-class aircraft carriers developed for the Royal Navy. The project was cancelled in the 2013 French White Paper on Defence and National Security.

== Background ==
The previous French carriers, Clemenceau and Foch, were completed in 1961 and 1963 respectively. The requirement for a replacement was identified in the mid-1970s, which became the 40,600 tonne nuclear-powered Charles de Gaulle, laid down in April 1989 at the DCNS Brest naval shipyard. This carrier was launched in May 1994, but not officially commissioned until 2001 due to a large number of problems, which included the need to lengthen the flight deck after aircraft trials, a broken propeller and vibration and noise problems. The French Navy was understood to be unwilling to proceed with another carrier of the same design and by 2003 the possibility of sharing the Royal Navy design emerged to fulfill the French requirement for a second carrier.

The requirement for the carriers was confirmed by Jacques Chirac in 2004 for the centennial of the Entente Cordiale and on 26 January 2006 the defence ministers of France and Britain reached an agreement regarding cooperation on the design of their future carriers. France agreed to pay the UK for access to the design due to the investment made to date. These payments were £30 million in January 2006, £25 million in July 2006 and a further £45 million if France decides to proceed with the project.

The FY2008 French defence budget included the necessary funding, €3 billion, for the ship. However, in April 2008 French Defence Minister Herve Morin cast doubt over plans for a second aircraft carrier, citing a cash crunch and the fact that rising oil prices put the question of the propulsion back on the table, and said a decision would be taken soon. Further doubts were cast on the project on 21 June 2008 when then French President Nicolas Sarkozy decided to suspend co-operation with Britain on the aircraft carrier. Sarkozy stated that a final decision on France building a second carrier would be taken by 2012.

British plans for two aircraft carriers went ahead as planned despite the French withdrawal, as the original project had in any case been a British one and not dependent on French involvement.

On 3 February 2009, the French government ordered studies about another architecture and design casting even more doubt on the likelihood of the French Navy using the current British design. The option of nuclear propulsion was also put back on the table, and if selected would have required a completely different approach. An option similar to the Azimuth thruster used on the Mistral-class ships was also considered.

== Design considerations ==
The French carrier would have been built by an alliance of Thales and DCNS using the proposed design of a 283 metres (928 ft) long, 75,000-tonne (74,000-long-ton) variant of the Queen Elizabeth class. While the UK had chosen to continue to use STOVL configuration for its new carriers, the design could also be reconfigured to a CATOBAR configuration for French requirements. The French variant would have most likely operated the fixed wing Dassault Rafale, the E-2C Hawkeye, and the Dassault-Breguet Super Étendard, and the rotary AS365 Dauphin, AS565 Panther, and the NH-90. Being a CATOBAR design, PA2 would have been equipped with the same 90 metres (300 ft) long C13-2 steam catapults as those installed on the Nimitz-class aircraft carriers of the United States Navy.

The crew of PA2 was expected to be about 1,650, a significant decrease from the 1,950 crew of Charles de Gaulle, indicating the high level of automation integrated into the ship's systems.

The ship would have had two islands: one devoted to ship navigation, and the other to air operations. Allowing optimal placement of bridges for both tasks; navigation calls for a bridge placed forward (as on Charles De Gaulle), while air operations are made easier with a bridge placed aft (as seen on the US Nimitz class).

The original design had to meet the Royal Navy's requirements, so nuclear propulsion was not an option: the British government rejected nuclear propulsion as too costly. Before cancellation, the carrier's propulsion system was expected to be an integrated full electric propulsion (IFEP) based on two Rolls-Royce MT30 gas turbines. The carrier would have had a range of approximately 10,000 nautical miles (19,000 km).

Orthographic view of the ship

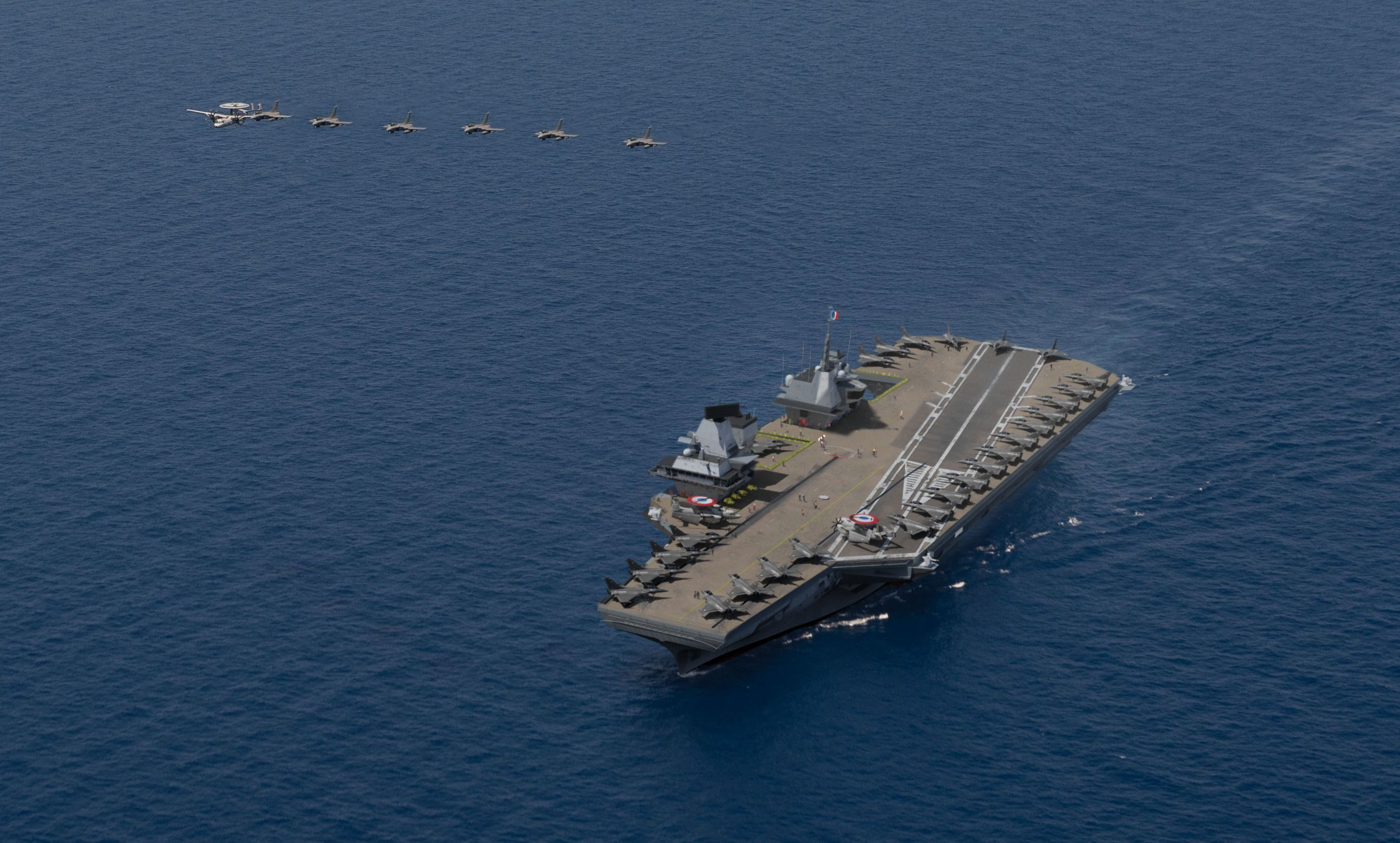
PA2 was designed as a CATOBAR ship, able to operate Rafale fighters and Hawkeye AWACS

== Construction considerations ==
The hull was likely to be built by Chantiers de l'Atlantique at Saint Nazaire, and fitted out by DCN at Brest. The ship was likely to be based at Toulon naval base whose two dry docks can accommodate even the larger Nimitz-class aircraft carriers.

== Name considerations ==
At the time, it had been proposed to name the aircraft carrier Richelieu, after Cardinal Richelieu, which was the name originally intended for Charles de Gaulle.

== See also ==
- Future French aircraft carrier
- Gerald R. Ford-class aircraft carrier
