= French frigate Cassard =

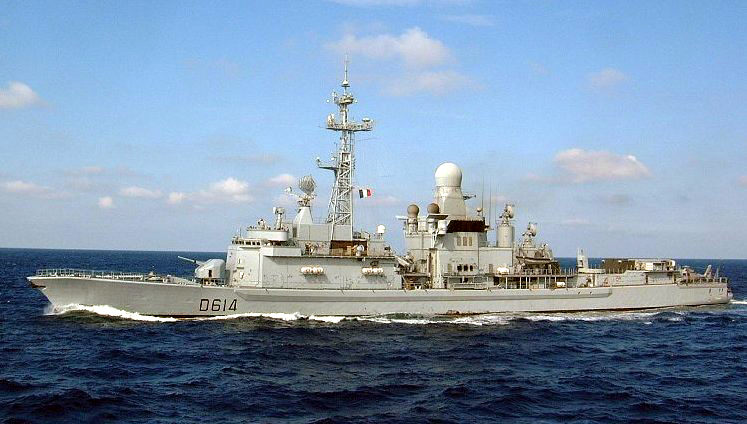

History

France
- Name: Cassard
- Namesake: Jacques Cassard
- Builder: DCNS S.A.
- Laid down: 3 September 1982
- Launched: 6 February 1985
- Commissioned: 29 July 1988
- Decommissioned: 15 March 2019
- Identification: Pennant number: D 614
- Status: Decommissioned

General characteristics
- Class & type: Cassard-class frigate
- Displacement: 4500 t
- Length: 139 m (456 ft)
- Beam: 14 m (46 ft)
- Draught: 6 m (20 ft)
- Propulsion: 4 Pielstick PA6 BTC diesel engines; 2 fixed pace propellers; 4 diesel-alternators (3400 kW) for electrical plant
- Speed: 25 knots (46 km/h)
- Range: 8,000 nautical miles (15,000 km) at 17 knots (31 km/h)
- Troops: room for special forces
- Complement: 22 officers; 142 non-commissioned officers; 80 enlisted personnel
- Sensors & processing systems: DRBV26C sentry radar; 1 DRBJ11B tri-dimensional air sentry radar; 1 DIBV2A infra-red alert system; 2 DRBN34 navigation and landing radar; 1 DUBV 24C hull sonar
- Electronic warfare & decoys: 1 ARBR 17 radar detector; 1 SAIGON radio emission detector; 1 ARBB 33 jammer; 2 SAGAIE NG decoy launchers; 2 DAGAIE decoy launchers; 1 Syracuse II system
- Armament: Anti-air; 1 × Mk 13 launcher (40 × Standard SM-1MR anti-air missiles); Anti-ship; 8 × MM40 Exocet anti-ship missiles; Anti-submarine; 2 × fixed torpedo tubes (10 × L5 mod 4 torpedoes); Guns; 1 × Creusot- Loire Compact 100mm/55 Mod 68 DP gun; 2 × 20mm F2 anti-aircraft guns; 4 × 12.7mm machine guns; CIWS; 2 × Sadral sextuple launcher (39 × Mistral CIWS anti-air missiles)
- Aircraft carried: 1 × Panther anti-submarine helicopter

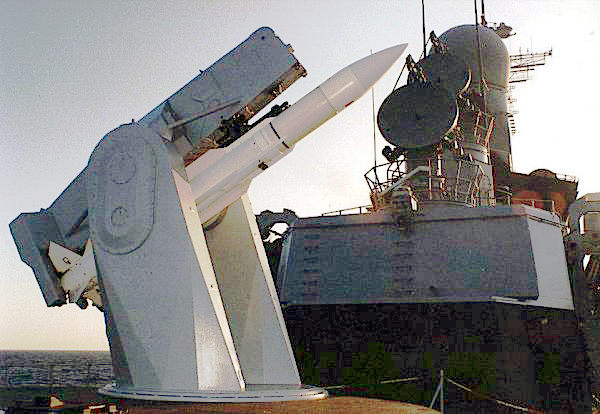
Tartar SM1 missile on Cassard.

Cassard was an anti-aircraft destroyer of the French Marine Nationale, lead ship of the Cassard class. She was the 10th vessel of the French Navy named after the 18th century captain Jacques Cassard.

== Service history ==
Cassard was fitted with a number of prototype equipments which were later incorporated into the La Fayette-class frigates.

In April 2016, Cassard was named as one of the ships participating in Operation Griffin Strike, a test of the Combined Joint Expeditionary Force between the French and British armed forces.
