= French aircraft carrier France Libre =

France future aircraft carrier project

France Libre
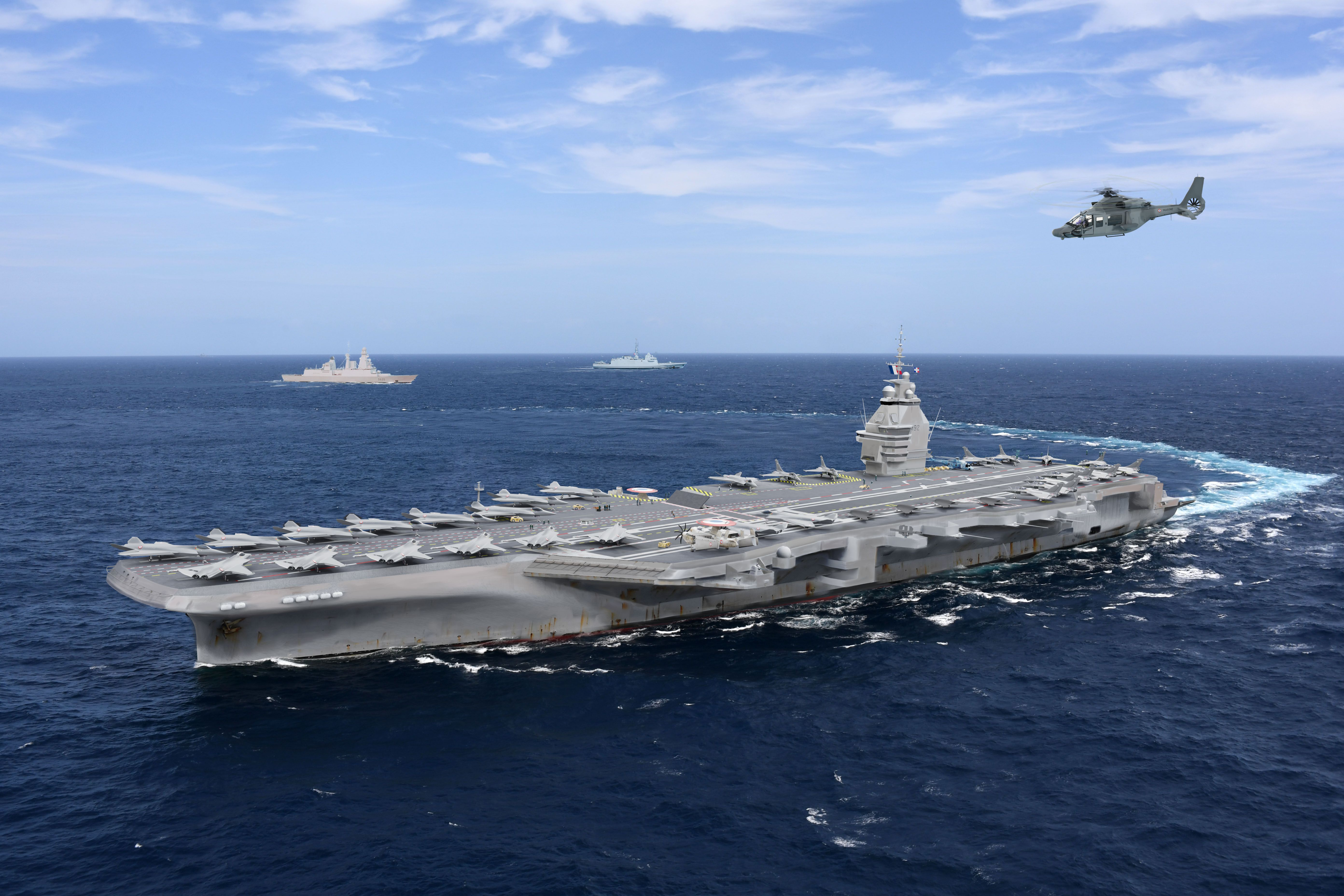
- Artist's impression of the carrier

Class overview
- Operators: French Navy
- Preceded by: Charles de Gaulle; PA2 (cancelled)
- Planned: 1–2

History
- Namesake: France Libre
- Status: In development

General characteristics
- Type: Aircraft carrier
- Displacement: 80,000 t (79,000 long tons) (full load)
- Length: Overall: 310 m (1,017 ft 1 in)
- Beam: Overall: 90 m (295 ft 3 in); Waterline: 40 m (131 ft 3 in)
- Propulsion: 2 × TechnicAtome K22 pressurised water reactors (PWR), approx. 220 MW_{th} each
- Speed: 27 knots (50 km/h; 31 mph)
- Range: Unlimited distance
- Complement: ~ 2,000 (including air wing)
- Aircraft carried: Rafale M; E-2D Hawkeye; NH90 Caïman; UAVs

France Libre, formerly the Porte-avions de nouvelle génération (PA-NG; "new generation aircraft carrier") is a planned aircraft carrier for the French Navy. Construction of France Libre is expected to begin around 2031 and it is projected to enter service in about 2038, the year the aircraft carrier Charles de Gaulle is due to be retired.

The ship will be nuclear-powered and will feature three General Atomics Electromagnetic Aircraft Launch System (EMALS) catapults and three sets of Advanced Arresting Gear (AAG).

== History ==
=== Context ===
The current French aircraft carrier, the nuclear-powered Charles de Gaulle, entered service on 18 May 2001. As the only aircraft carrier of the French Navy, the ship's maintenance periods leave France without an available aircraft carrier. As a result the PA2 project (French: Porte-Avions 2, "Aircraft Carrier 2") started in 2003 to study the feasibility of another carrier based on the design of the British Queen Elizabeth class. The PA2 project was suspended in 2009 and ultimately cancelled in 2013.

In October 2018, French Minister of the Armed Forces Florence Parly announced the start of a second carrier programme, this time as replacement for Charles de Gaulle. The military planning legislation for 2019–2025 (Loi de programmation militaire 2019–2025) defined a 18-month, €40M study phase, to allow the President to decide on the main characteristics of the programme by 2020. In May 2020, during a visit to Chantiers de l'Atlantique, Parly stated that the new carrier would be built in Saint-Nazaire, since it is the only dry dock in France capable of harbouring ships of that size.

Architecture, propulsion options and number of ships were originally to be decided by President Emmanuel Macron in July 2020, to allow him to make the announcement at Bastille Day. However, on 6 July 2020, a governmental reshuffle put the Castex government in charge, forcing to delay the Defence Council to later in the year.

During a visit to the Framatome site at Le Creusot on 8 December 2020, President Macron officially announced the start of the PANG programme, and the selection of nuclear propulsion for the new ship.

In 2022, Naval Group released new renderings of the carrier that included a revised island structure.

On 18 March 2026, President Macron announced that the carrier would be named France Libre after the Free France government-in-exile led by Charles de Gaulle during World War II.

=== Project timeline ===
The hull assembly is planned to begin in 2032 at the Chantiers de l'Atlantique. It is planned to be transferred to the Toulon Naval Base for outfitting that includes the nuclear fuelling (mid-2035). It is expected to be commissioned in 2038.

== Design ==
=== Propulsion ===
The ship will be nuclear-powered. It will feature two TechnicAtome K22 pressurised water reactors (PWR). Upon entering service, depending on if it's commissioned when Charles de Gaulle is either in service or already retired, the ship will either be one of two nuclear carriers outside of the US Navy, or take the latter's place as the only one.

=== Flight deck ===
The ship will be built with a flight deck with an estimated surface area of 17,200 square metres (185,000 sq ft), served by two elevators with a 40 tonnes (88,000 lb) capacity. The angled flight deck will feature three Electromagnetic Aircraft Launch System (EMALS) and three sets of Advanced Arresting Gear (AAG). The equipment will be supplied by General Atomics under a Foreign Military Sales agreement.

=== Equipment ===
==== Aircraft ====
The estimated fleet of aircraft on the ship will be:

- Jet fighters:
  - up to 30 × Dassault Rafale M F5
- Airborne early warning and control aircraft:
  - up to 3 ×Northrop Grumman E-2D Advanced Hawkeye
- Helicopters: up to 6 of the following:
  - Anti-submarine: NHIndustries NH90 Caïman (NH90 NFH)
  - Plane guard and liaison: Airbus H160M Guépard
- Unmanned aerial vehicles:
  - Unmanned combat aerial vehicles were planned in the now-cancelled Future Combat Air System project

==== Weapons ====
There is an ammunition store designed to sustain seven days of aircraft combat operations at a high tempo.

== Construction ==
In May 2020, the Minister of the Armed Forces, Florence Parly, stated that the PANG would be built in Saint-Nazaire at Chantiers de l'Atlantique.

On 25 September 2025, Naval Group's Cherbourg site began manufacturing the first components for the PANG nuclear reactors. On 21 December, in a speech to French forces in the United Arab Emirates, French President Emmanuel Macron announced the launch of construction of the PANG, which had been decided upon during a ministerial investment committee meeting.

Preliminary design work on new 220-megawatt K22 nuclear reactors to power the ship was completed in 2023. A production contract for the ship itself is anticipated in 2026 after final approval by the President, Emmanuel Macron, was announced on 21 December 2025. Hull construction is expected to begin in about 2031. Sea trials are projected to begin in around 2035. It is projected to enter service in about 2038.

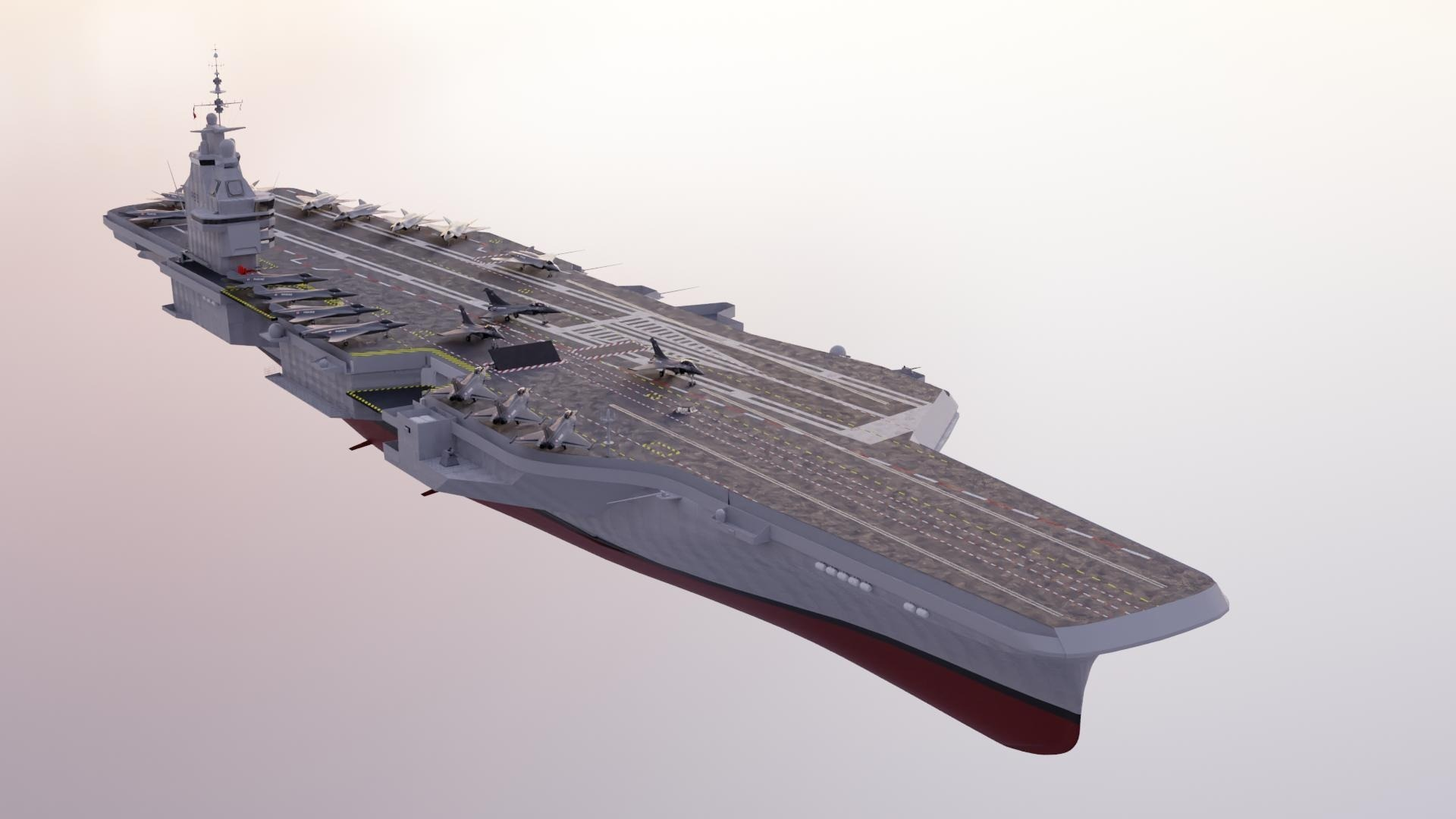
General outlines of the ship

Interactive 3D model

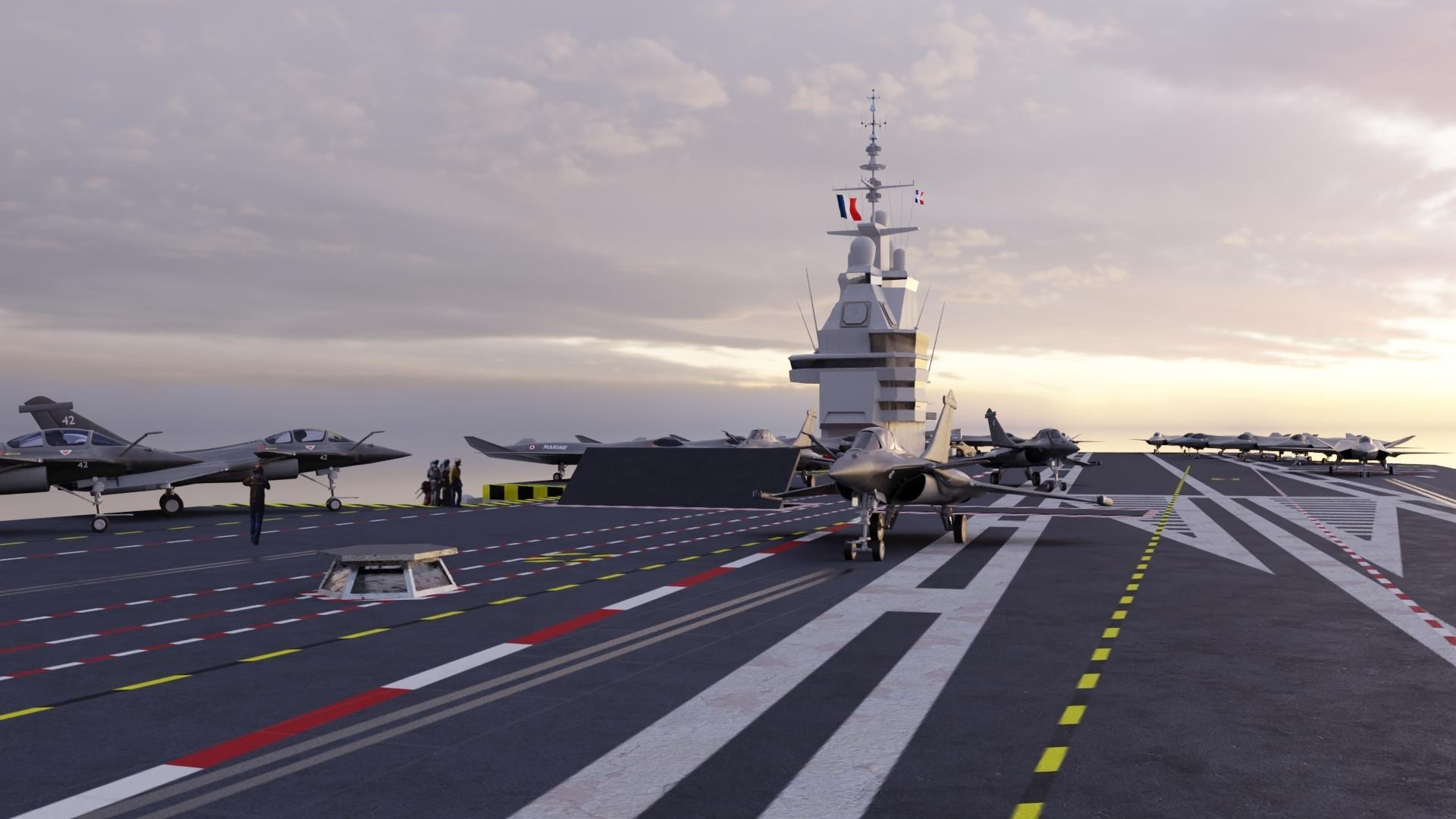
Rendering of view looking aft from the forward end of the landing zone, with the distinctive French landing markings (right)

== See also ==
- French aircraft carrier PA2 (previous effort to construct a new French aircraft carrier, canceled 2013)
- Future of the French Navy
