= Cassard-class frigate =

French Navy ship class (1988–2021)

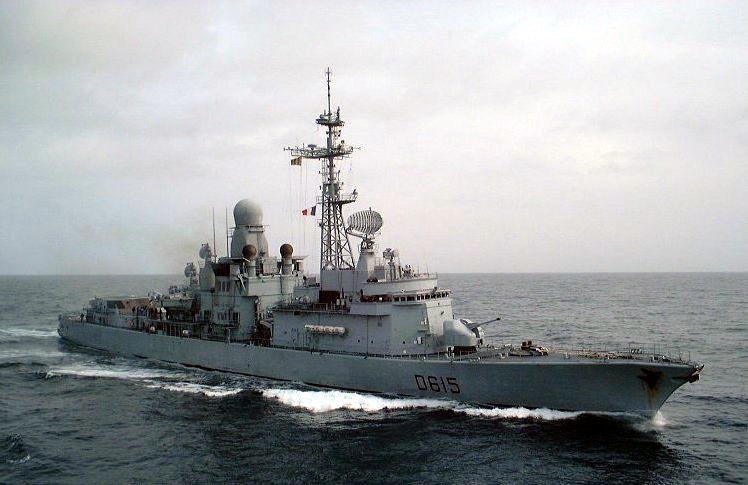
- Jean Bart

Class overview
- Name: Cassard class
- Builders: Arsenal de Lorient (DCAN)
- Operators: Marine Nationale
- Succeeded by: Aquitaine class (air-defence variant)
- Built: 1982–1991
- In service: 1988–2021
- Completed: 2
- Retired: 2

General characteristics
- Type: Frigate
- Displacement: 4,500 tons, 5,000 full load
- Length: 139 m (456 ft 0 in)
- Beam: 14 m (45 ft 11 in)
- Draught: 6.5 m (21 ft 4 in)
- Propulsion: 4 × SEMT Pielstick 18PA6-V280 BTC diesel engines; 31,000 kW (42,000 hp), 2 shafts
- Speed: 29.5 knots (54.6 km/h; 33.9 mph)
- Range: 8,000 nmi (15,000 km; 9,200 mi) at 17 kn (31 km/h; 20 mph)
- Complement: 250
- Sensors & processing systems: Thomson-CSF ARBR 17B radar warning; DIBV 1A Vampir; Thomson-CSF DRBJ 11B air search radar; Thales SMART-S MK2 (replacing DRBJ 11B); Thomson-CSF DRBV 26C; 2 × Racal DRBN 34A navigational radar; Thomson-CSF DRBC 33A fire control for guns; 2 × Raytheon SPG-51C fire control for missiles; Thomson Sintra DUBA 25A sonar; SENIT 68 combat data system; Syracuse 2 SATCOM; OPSMER command support system
- Electronic warfare & decoys: Thomson-CSF ARBB-33 jammer
- Armament: Anti-air; 1 × Mk 13 launcher (40 × Standard SM-1MR anti-air missiles); Anti-ship; 8 × MM40 Exocet anti-ship missiles; Anti-submarine; 2 × fixed torpedo tubes (10 × L5 mod 4 torpedoes); Guns; 1 × Creusot-Loire Compact 100 mm/55 Mod 68 DP gun; 2 × 20 mm F2 anti-aircraft guns; 4 × 12.7 mm machine guns; CIWS; 2 × Sadral sextuple launcher (39 × Mistral CIWS anti-air missiles)
- Aircraft carried: 1 × Eurocopter AS 565 Panther anti-submarine helicopter

The Cassard class (Type F70 AA) was a class of two anti-air warfare destroyers of the French Navy introduced in the latter 1980s/early 1990s. The class was an air defence variant of the Georges Leygues class. The two classes have a different armament and propulsion system mounted on an identical hull. Their primary role was to provide air cover for a fleet, an aeronaval group, a convoy & a littoral point. Their secondary role was to manage air assets coordination & aircraft control for the force, especially through Link 16.They can also be used for research, identification or presence missions. Both ships were assigned to the Force d'Action Navale. The lead ship of the class, Cassard, was retired in 2019 followed by the retirement of Jean Bart in 2021.

The experience gained during the design and construction of the Cassard type was used for the design of the La Fayette class.

== Design ==
The Cassard-class frigate was initially designed to replace the four T 47-class anti-air warfare vessels in service at the time. Initially procured with four ships in the class, (the third and fourth hulls authorized for construction in 1983), the class was cut back to two vessels after the United States chose to terminate the production of the Standard SM-1MR missile. The prolonged design period led to the plans being redrawn several times.

The class shared a common hull design with the Georges Leygues class. The superstructure was composed of a lightweight aluminum alloy that is resistant to fire and corrosion. However the adoption of a similar propulsion system was abandoned early on. The hot exhaust from the Olympus turbines found on the Georges Leygues class was thought to be incompatible with the numerous arrays required in the new design. The ships were crewed by 244 personnel but could accommodate 251.

The class carried one anti-submarine helicopter on a deck placed aft with a hangar provided for storage. Originally supplied with a Eurocopter AS 565 Panther, they were later replaced with the Westland Lynx. The SAMAHE 210 helicopter handling system is adaptable to different types of undercarriages on helicopters and had munitions trucks to position weapon loadouts to assist the arming of the helicopters.

=== Propulsion ===
The Cassard class were powered by four SEMT Pielstick 18 PA6V 280 BTC diesels creating a sustained 32,200 kW (43,200 hp) driving two shafts. This provided the ships a maximum speed of 29.5 knots (54.6 km/h; 33.9 mph) and a range of 8,000 nautical miles (15,000 km; 9,200 mi) at 17 knots (31 km/h; 20 mph). The SEMT Pielstick diesels are capable of double super-charging. The engines were placed upon flexible mountings reducing the noise signature of the ship.

=== Armament ===
The Cassard frigates were armed with one Mk 13 launcher for the 40 Standard SM-1MR anti-air missiles. The missiles have semi-active radar homing out to 46 km (29 mi) at Mach 2 with a ceiling limit of 18,288 m (60,000 ft). The Mk 13 single arm launchers and SPG 51 tracker/illuminators were taken off the T 47 destroyers Bouvet and Kersaint and refurbished.

The Cassards were also provided with two Sadral sextuple launchers for 39 Mistral CIWS anti-air missiles. The Mistrals have infrared homing out to 4 km (2.5 mi) and have a 3 kg (6.6 lb) warhead. They are anti-sea skimmer missiles and are able to engage incoming targets down to 10 ft (3.0 m) above sea level.

For anti-ship weaponry, the class was provided with eight MM40 Exocet anti-ship missiles. The MM40 Exocet missiles are sea-skimmers with a warhead of 165 kg (364 lb) and have a range of 70 km (43 mi) at Mach 0.9. The frigates also had two fixed torpedo tubes for ten L5 mod 4 torpedoes. These torpedoes have active and passive homing with a range of 9.5 km (5.9 mi) at 35 kn (65 km/h; 40 mph). They carry a 150 kg (330 lb) warhead and can travel to a depth of 550 m (1,800 ft).

The Cassard class was armed with a Creusot-Loire Compact 100 mm (3.9 in)/55 Mod 68 DP gun. The gun can fire 80 rounds per minute out to 17 km (11 mi) in an anti-surface role and 8 km (5.0 mi) against aerial targets. Initially the class was designed to have a second 100 mm main gun on the quarterdeck, however during the design phase the guns were removed and replaced with the helicopter hangar and two Sadral launchers. The vessels were also supplied with two 20 mm (0.79 in) F2 anti-aircraft guns and four 12.7 mm (0.50 in) machine guns.

=== Electronics ===
- 1 DRBV26C sentry radar
- 1 Thales SMART-S MK2 (replacing DRBJ11B)
- 1 DIBV2A infra-red alert system
- 2 DRBN34 navigation and landing radar
- 1 DUBV 24C hull sonar
- Syracuse II satellite communication system
- 1 ARBR 17 radar detector
- 1 SAIGON radio emission detector
- 1 ARBB 33 jammer
- 2 SAGAIE NG decoy launchers
- 2 DAGAIE decoy launchers

== Ships in class ==
Cassard class construction data
Name	Pennant	Laid down	Launched	Commissioned	Decommissioned
Cassard	D 614	3 September 1982	6 February 1985	28 July 1988	15 March 2019
Jean Bart	D 615	12 March 1986	19 March 1988	21 September 1991	31 August 2021
Courbet	D 616	Cancelled			
~	D 617	Cancelled			

They were decommissioned in conjunction with the introduction of the FREDA air defence frigates in 2021–2022.

== Gallery ==
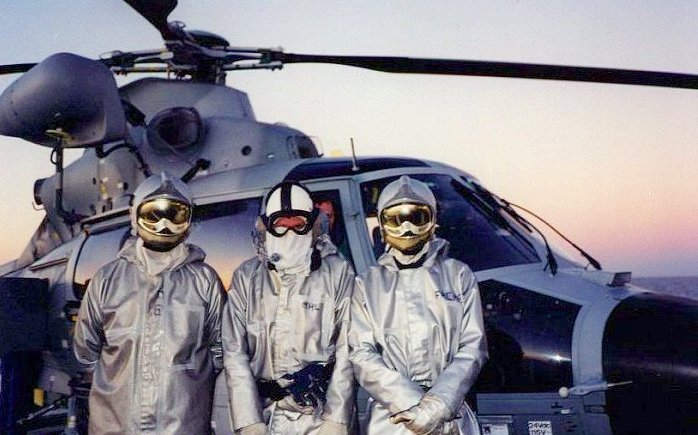
Fire team of Cassard

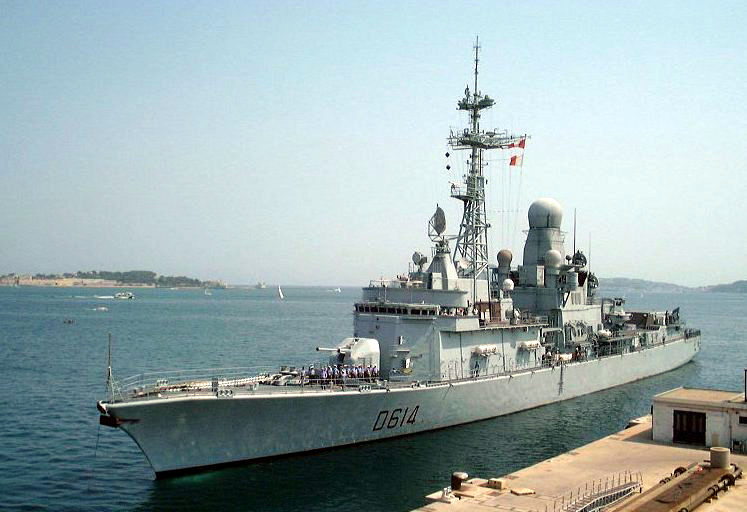
Frigate Cassard

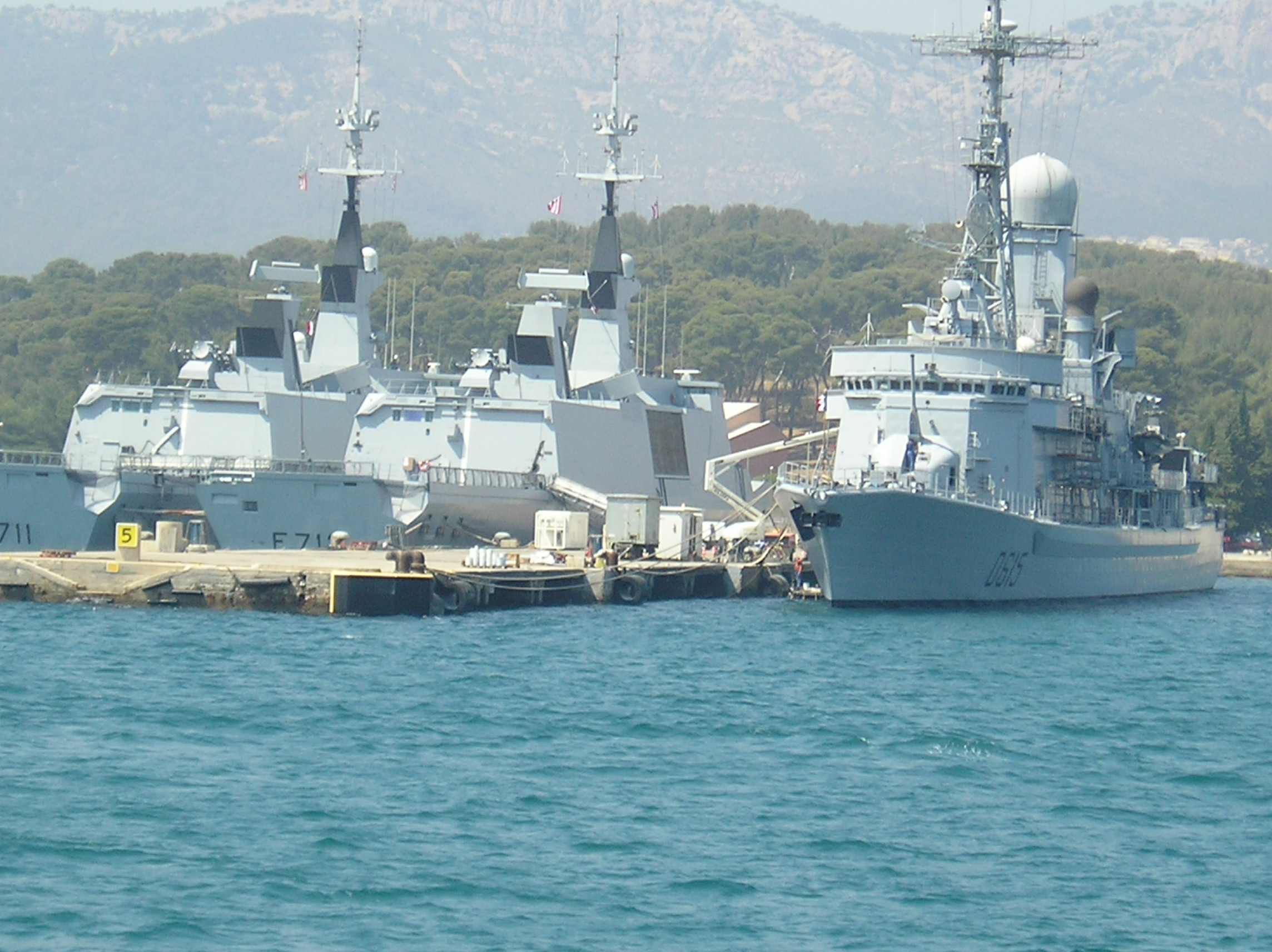
Jean Bart beside the frigates Surcouf and Courbet

== See also ==
- List of naval ship classes in service

Equivalent frigates of the same era

- Adelaide class
- Jacob van Heemskerck class
- Santa María class
- Godavari class
- Cheng Kung class
