= French frigate Jean Bart =

Anti-air frigate of French Navy

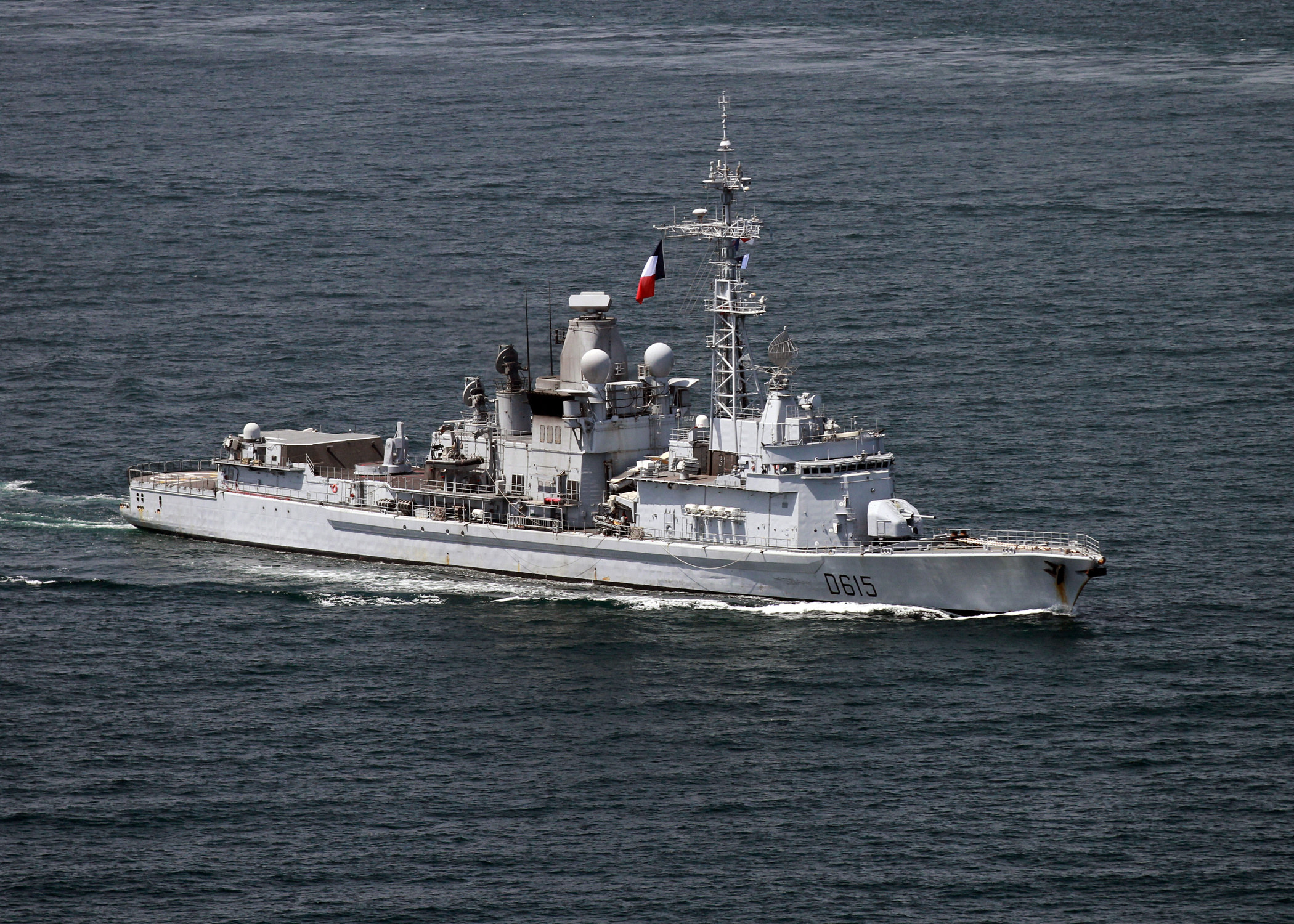
- Jean Bart in April 2014

History

France
- Name: Jean Bart
- Namesake: Jean Bart
- Builder: DCNS S.A.
- Laid down: 12 February 1986
- Launched: 19 March 1988
- Commissioned: 21 September 1991
- Decommissioned: 31 August 2021
- Identification: D 615
- Status: Decommissioned

General characteristics
- Class & type: Cassard-class frigate
- Displacement: 4,500 t (4,400 long tons)
- Length: 139 m (456 ft 0 in)
- Beam: 14 m (45 ft 11 in)
- Draught: 6 m (19 ft 8 in)
- Propulsion: 4 Pielstick PA6 BTC diesel engines; 2 fixed pitch propellers; 4 diesel-alternators (3400 kW) for electrical plant
- Speed: 25 knots (46 km/h; 29 mph)
- Range: 8,000 nautical miles (15,000 km; 9,200 mi) at 17 knots (31 km/h; 20 mph)
- Complement: 22 officers; 142 non-commissioned officers; 80 enlisted personnel
- Sensors & processing systems: DRBV26C sentry radar; 1 DRBJ11B tri-dimensional air sentry radar; 1 DIBV2A infra-red alert system; 2 DRBN34 navigation and landing radar; 1 DUBV 24C hull sonar
- Electronic warfare & decoys: 1 ARBR 17 radar detector; 1 SAIGON radio emission detector; 1 ARBB 33 jammer; 2 SAGAIE NG decoy launchers; 2 DAGAIE decoy launchers; 1 Syracuse II system
- Armament: Anti-air; 1 × Mk 13 launcher (40 × Standard SM-1MR anti-air missiles); Anti-ship; 8 × MM40 Exocet anti-ship missiles; Anti-submarine; 2 × fixed torpedo tubes (10 × L5 mod 4 torpedoes); Guns; 1 × Creusot- Loire Compact 100 mm/55 Mod 68 DP gun; 2 × 20 mm F2 anti-aircraft guns; 4 × 12.7 mm machine guns; CIWS; 2 × Sadral sextuple launcher (39 × Mistral CIWS anti-air missiles)
- Aircraft carried: 1 × Panther anti-submarine helicopter

Jean Bart was a Cassard-class anti-air frigate of the French Marine Nationale. She was the eighth vessel of the French Navy named after the privateer Jean Bart. She was commissioned on 3 March 1991.

Jean Bart was fitted with a number of types of prototype equipment which were later incorporated in the La Fayette-class frigates. The vessel was withdrawn from service in August 2021.

== Service history ==
On 12 April 2008, Jean Bart aided the capture of the pirates who had taken over the luxury yacht MY Le Ponant. She took part in Operation Unified Protector until she returned to her home port Toulon in April 2011.

In October 2014, Jean Bart entered the US Fifth Fleet and joined up with CTF 50 for Opération Chammal.

On 11 October 2019, Jean Bart, accompanied by the Royal Navy frigate HMS Montrose, intercepted a suspicious dhow in the Arabian Sea and seized 170 kilograms (370 lb) of illegal narcotics.

From 4 May to 1 June 2020, Jean Bart participated in the European Union's Operation Irini, enforcing the arms embargo on Libya. The frigate returned to Toulon from her deployment to the Indian Ocean in March 2021 and had been expected to decommission in Spring 2021 to be replaced by the FREMM-class frigate Alsace. However, it was subsequently announced that the frigate would remain in service temporarily and deploy on one final mission to Greece in April to demonstrate her capabilities in the context of a French offer to transfer her to the Hellenic Navy. After the Greek Government elected not to acquire her, Jean Bart was decommissioned on 31 August 2021.
