= Future of the French Navy =

The French Navy's modernization, as is the case with the Army and Air and Space Force, is pursued on the basis of successive 7-year Military Planning Laws (Loi de Programmation Militaire or LPM). The latest LPM covers the 2024–30 period and is tailored around four strategic priorities: the strengthening of deterrence assets; preparation for high-intensity warfare; protecting national interests in all French territories (notably the Outre-mer), shared spaces and key domains (e.g., maritime, digital, outer space); and finally, the strengthening of international partnerships.

Major programs encompass a wide variety of capabilities; from the replacement of the current generation of ballistic missile submarines, nuclear attack submarines and nuclear-powered aircraft carrier to the ongoing modernization of the first-rank surface combatant fleet as well as offshore patrol and logistic support fleets.

== Core Surface and Sub-Surface Capabilities ==
- 1 PANG new generation nuclear-powered aircraft carrier to succeed Charles de Gaulle: Scheduled to be commissioned in 2038. In October 2018, the French Ministry of Defence launched an 18-month study for €40 million for the future replacement of Charles de Gaulle beyond 2030. In December 2020 President Macron announced that the project would proceed. Preliminary design work on new 220 MW K22 nuclear reactors to power the ship was completed in 2023. A production contract for the ship itself is anticipated in about 2026 with hull construction to begin in about 2031. (President Macron approved moving forward with a contract for the project on 21 December 2025). Sea trials are projected to begin in around 2035. The carrier is planned to have a displacement of around 75,000 tons and to carry about 32 next-generation fighters, two to three E-2D Advanced Hawkeyes and a yet-to-be-determined number of unmanned carrier air vehicles.
- 4 SNLE 3G new generation ballistic missile submarines to succeed the Triomphant-class: Studies were initiated in 2017 on the construction of a new class of SSBNs to renew the national nuclear deterrent in the 2030s. Steel cut on the first of the new submarines took place in March 2024 with the first new SSBN to enter service in about 2035. Deliveries of the three follow-on boats are expected to occur thereafter at five year intervals.
- 6 Suffren-class nuclear-powered attack submarines to succeed the Rubis-class: the contract for the first three of these submarines was signed in 2006. The construction of the first boat in the class also began in 2006 and she was commissioned in 2020. The second vessel was delivered in 2023 while the third entered service in 2024. Additional boats in the class will enter service through the 2020s, with the sixth submarine planned for service entry in 2030.
- 5 FDI (formerly FTI) frigates being delivered from 2025 onwards: Construction work on modules for the lead ship of the FDI class, Amiral Ronarc'h, began in October 2019. She was formally laid down on 17 December 2021, launched in November 2022, began sea trials in late 2024 and was delivered to the navy in October 2025. The FDI program follows on the construction of 8 FREMM multipurpose frigates for the navy, the first of which was delivered in 2012 and the last in 2022. In 2015 the order of FREMM-class units was reduced to 8 ships and it was decided to proceed with the purchase of FDI medium-size frigates instead.

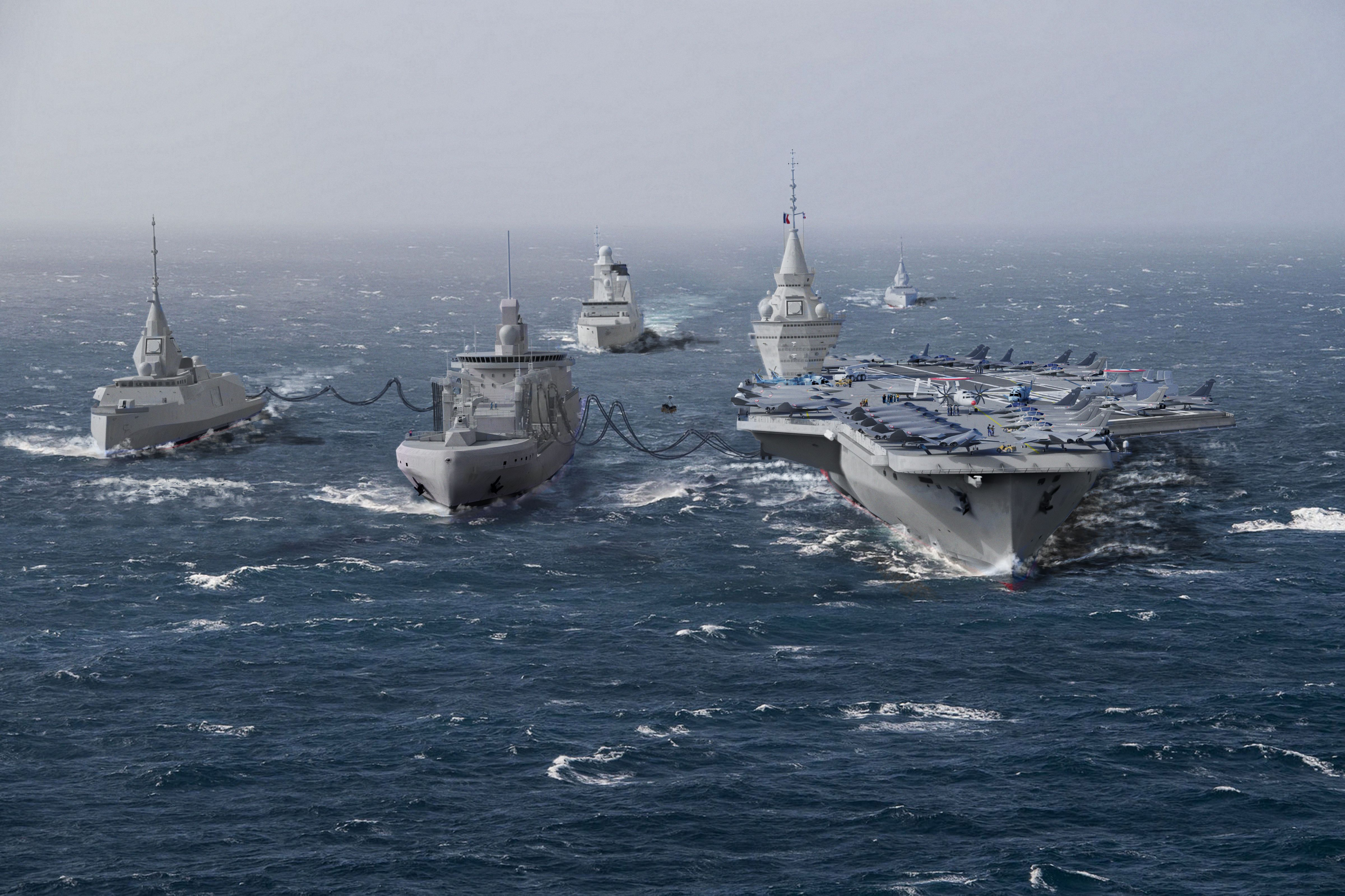
The French Navy as planned for the late 2030s: a Bâtiment ravitailleur de forces (fleet tanker) conducts simultaneous underway replenishment with the Future French aircraft carrier and with a Frégate de défense et d'intervention (Defence and Intervention Frigate).

== Sovereignty Protection Vessels ==
- The European Patrol Corvette (EPC) program or Modular and Multirole Patrol Corvette (MMPC): currently under development in cooperation with various European states. In the case of France, the acquisition of 6 units is planned in order to replace the French Navy's aging 6 Floréal-class surveillance frigates in early to mid-2030s.
- 10 Patrouilleurs Hauturiers (PH), formerly Patrouilleurs Océaniques (PO), 7 by 2030, plus a further 3 to follow by 2035: this new class of vessels is intended to replace the French Navy's D'Estienne d'Orves-class offshore patrol vessels (previously avisos) based in both the Atlantic and Mediterranean, as well as the PSP Flamant-class coast guard vessels based in Cherbourg. 10 ocean-going patrol vessels of about 2,000-tons were originally planned, with the first unit expected to be delivered in 2025 and all by 2030. However, in the 2024-2030 LPM unveiled on April 4, 2023, it was revealed only 7 vessels are to be in service by 2030, with the first unit being delivered in 2026 and the last in 2029 (this was reportedly due to significant cost increase; Sébastien Lecornu, the Minister of the Armed Forces, having spoken at a Senate hearing on June 28, 2023, about an additional €500 million being needed in the LPM for two more PH vessels as requested by the Senators in an amendment). The remaining 3 units, meanwhile, are to be ordered and delivered between 2030 and 2035. It has been reported so far the ships will be equipped with a hull sonar, enabling them to escort submarines tasked with nuclear deterrence, as well as with the Thales and Nexter 40mm RAPIDFire CIWS. They will also be used for state action at sea, such as fisheries and traffic surveillance. The first seven ships were ordered in November 2023. In late 2024 it was reported that service entry for the first ship of the class would likely be in 2027. That subsequently slipped to 2028.
- 6 Patrouilleur Outre-mer: these offshore patrol vessels are being delivered between 2023 and 2027 and are tasked with the protection of the exclusive economic zones of French overseas territories in the Indian Ocean and the Pacific. Two ships each are to be based in New Caledonia, Tahiti and Réunion respectively. The vessels were ordered in December 2019 and construction began in October 2020. In May 2021, it was reported that the delivery of the first of these vessels would be delayed, from an originally planned in-service date of 2022 to 2023. The lead ship of the class, Auguste Benebig, was launched at the Socarenam shipyard in Saint Malo on October 15, 2021, and began sea trials in July 2022. She arrived at her home base in New Caledonia in April 2023. A second vessel arrived in Tahiti in May 2024, followed by a third in Réunion in 2025 and a fourth in New Caledonia in 2026.

== Mine Warfare Vessels ==
- Système de lutte anti-mines futur (SLAM-F): The program aims to develop a wide variety of systems to replace the French Navy's current mine warfare vessels (Éridan-class minehunters as well as associated sonar towing vessels and EOD diving support vessels). The SLAM-F will consist of 6 motherships (BGDM), 8 unmanned systems, 5 new generation base ships for mine clearance divers (BBPD NG) and 1 Mine Warfare Data Processing System (SEDGM). These will be complemented by 8 Ophrys-class diving support vessels (VSP), the first of which was delivered in November 2022 and the last unit expected to be delivered by 2026. Initial operational capability for the unmanned systems is to be achieved in late 2023 starting with shore-based elements. The first unmanned Mine Warfare Prototype of the system was delivered in November 2021. At Euronaval 2022, a partnership agreement was signed between the Belgian, Dutch and French navies to enhance cooperation between them. As a result, the 6 BDGM motherships that the French Navy will order as part of the SLAM-F program will be a variant of the City-class design intended for the Dutch and Belgian navies. 3 BDGM, 6 unmanned systems, 3 BBPD NG as well as the 8 VSP are expected to be in service by 2030 and all systems planned by 2035. These dates will likely be impacted by a 2024 decision to delay the start of construction of the BDGM vessels by one year, until 2025.

== Amphibious warfare ships ==
- 14 EDA-S Amphibious Standard Landing Craft: the craft have been ordered to replace CTM landing craft that equip the Mistral-class amphibious assault ships and to restore a light amphibious transport capability to French forces stationed in some of France's overseas territories (Mayotte, New Caledonia, Martinique and French Guiana) and Djibouti. The vessels have a payload capacity of 65 to 80 tonnes and a maximum speed of 11 knots (at full load). The first two EDA-S vessels (Arbalète and Arquebuse) were delivered to the navy in November 2021 and entered operational service in July 2022. The next four units were intended for the Toulon naval base and were to have been delivered from mid-2023 onwards. Deliveries will continue up to 2026.
- 4 Light Force Projection Ships: During the 2023 parliamentary review of the 2024-30 LPM, several amendments were adopted to add a program for light amphibious ships capable of landing on beaches with no major port infrastructure to existing plans in order to restore the rapid intra-theater transport of troops and cargo capabilities lost in New Caledonia, French Polynesia, La Réunion and Martinique when the BATRAL-class landing ship tanks were decommissioned between 2004 and 2017. The concerns were shared by the Minister of Armed Forces. He indicated the government was favorable to this and that feasibility studies would be initiated on the development of the light force projection ships.
- CB90-class fast assault craft: Vessels are planned for acquisition from Sweden for the Navy's Marine and Commando Force (Forfusco). Three vessels were acquired on loan in 2025 and, as of 2026, a contract for the purchase of new vessels was being finalized.

== Support Ships ==
- 4 Jacques Chevallier-class new generation replenishment tankers: these vessels are a variant of Italy's Vulcano-class logistic support ship and three are to be delivered to the French Navy between 2023 and 2027. In 2024-2030 LPM, it was decided that the order of the fourth ship of the class was to be delayed beyond 2030. They will replace the current Durance class support ships and will be able to carry twice as much fuel, arms and ammunition, spare parts and food. They will possess workshops to perform repairs and carry and support helicopters for maritime operations. The French vessels will be larger than their Italian counterparts due to the need for a greater capacity for aviation fuel. Construction of the lead ship of the class, Jacques Chevallier, began in May 2020. She was launched in April 2022, began sea trials in December and was delivered in July 2023. The second ship of the class (Jacques Stosskopf) began construction in February 2022 followed by the start of construction on the third vessel (Émile Bertin) in December 2023. Jacques Stosskopf was commissioned into service with the French Navy in May 2026.

== Hydrographic and oceanographic survey vessels ==
- Capacité Hydrographique et Océanographique Future (CHOF): the program aims at renewing and adapting France's hydrographic and oceanographic data gathering capability. For that purpose, the 3000 tonne-class vessel under development will incorporate many innovations such as a new generation on-board cold atom gravimeter, the use of surface and underwater drones as well as gliders and the development of artificial intelligence solutions for data processing. It is intended to fulfill various missions ranging from general hydrography to strategic defence functions and government action at sea. 2 CHOF vessels are scheduled to enter full service by 2029. They will be complemented by a third hydro-oceanographic asset (yet to be determined) by 2035.

== Uncrewed surface vessels and submarines ==
- The navy plans to acquire "several dozen" surface drones (USVs) for embarkation on French Navy vessels, in particular the Mistral-class amphibious helicopter carriers (PHA) and the Loire-class metropolitan support and assistance vessels (BSAM). In September 2026, the French Defence Procurement Agency (DGA) published a call for tenders for the vessels.
- In 2023 a framework agreement was signed between the Ministry of the Armed Forces and Naval Group for the development and testing of a first Uncrewed Underwater Vessel (UCUV). The first vessel is planned for testing in 2028.

== Naval Aviation ==
- 3 E-2D Advanced Hawkeye carrier-based early warning aircraft will be introduced from 2030 onwards to replace the E-2C currently in French service.
- PATMAR new generation maritime patrol aircraft program intended to succeed the Atlantique 2 maritime patrol aircraft: On December 22, 2022, the DGA awarded Airbus Defence and Space and Dassault Aviation two architecture studies for a future maritime patrol system based on one of their aircraft: the A320neo for Airbus Defence and Space and the Falcon 10X for Dassault Aviation, for a total of €10.9 million awarded per study to each manufacturer. In the interim, 18 Atlantique 2 aircraft have been upgraded to the "Standard 6" configuration. The last of these upgraded aircraft was delivered in February 2026.
- 7 Falcon 2000 Albatros Maritime Surveillance and Intervention Aircraft (AVSIMAR) were ordered in 2020 and delivery began in mid-2026. An operational capability is anticipated from late 2026 onwards. A total of 12 units are planned and all are expected to be in service by 2035.
- 49 Airbus H160M Guépard helicopters are to be delivered to the French Navy from 2029 onwards. Pending delivery of the militarized H160M, the French Navy is to be delivered 6 commercial H160s optimized for search and rescue missions in a lease purchase contract, with delivery to begin in May 2022 onwards. They are to be operated for 10 years. To complement this interim fleet, 12 Dauphin N3 helicopters will also be leased and serve through the 2020s.
- VSR700 unmanned aerial systems are planned for integration on the French Navy's major surface combatants, starting in 2027. Initially six systems are to be delivered to the navy. An additional five Schiebel S-100 Camcopter systems (with two aircraft each) have also been ordered for delivery over the 2026-2030 period. Initial deployment of these systems will be on the navy's FREMM-class frigates and on the Jacques Chevalier-class support ships.
- 34 Aliaca fixed-wing unmanned air systems have been ordered for the French Navy. A new vertical take-off and landing (VTOL) version of the system was subsequently ordered in 2026 and were planned for service entry on the Loire-class metropolitan support and assistance vessels (BSAMs) in late 2026 and on the D'Entrecasteaux-class overseas support and assistance vessels (BSAOMs) in 2027.

== Missiles and other Weapon Systems ==
- The upcoming Aster 30 B1 NT is being procured to strengthen French first-rank frigates' anti-ballistic missile capabilities.
- MdCN land-attack missiles have been deployed on 6 of the 8 Aquitaine-class frigates and will also be integrated on all 6 Barracuda-class submarines.
- The Exocet Block 3c, latest variant of the legacy anti-ship missile, is being delivered to the French Navy since December 2022.
- The Future Cruise/Anti-Ship Weapon, is currently under development in cooperation with the United Kingdom and Italy. The missiles are to be operational by 2030 and will be replacing the SCALP-EG cruise missile as well as the Exocet anti-ship missile.
- The Anti-Navire Léger lightweight anti-ship missile is also scheduled to enter service in the 2020s.
- The French Navy is working on the integration of directed-energy weapons on various warships. The Helma-P laser weapon system, for example, has been successfully tested on the Horizon-class Forbin destroyer in June 2023.

== See also ==
- Future of the United States Navy
- Future of the Royal Navy
- Future of the Royal Australian Navy
- Future of the Brazilian Navy
- Future of the Indian Navy
- Future of the Royal Netherlands Navy
- Future of the Russian Navy
- Future of the Spanish Navy

== Notes ==
- Decision on future French aircraft carrier – December 2020 – https://news.yahoo.com/frances-next-generation-aircraft-carrier-164947235.html
