= List of future Spanish Navy ships =

Naval jack of Spain

The strategic plans of the Spanish Navy are based on the National Defence Directive (NDD) signed by the President of the Government in June 2020. A subsequent Defence Policy Directive was then approved by the Minister of Defence. These serve to guide the Concept of Employment of the Armed Forces (CEFAS-21). The earlier 2003 Strategic Defence Review identified six capabilities as critical to the navy. These included: a "Projection Capability" and three subordinate capabilities (Protection, Freedom of Action and Operational Logistic Support). Additionally, the protection of national maritime interests at sea (sovereignty protection) and contributing to early warning were identified to round out the strategic planning framework. The core element has been the "Projection Capability" which was deemed to necessitate platforms that included: a command and control ship, amphibious shipping, an aircraft carrier, platforms with land-attack capabilities and a strategic projection ship. The protection and logistical support capabilities necessitate ships with surface-to-air, surface-to-surface and ASW capabilities while the logistic support capabilities require vessels capable of sustaining task forces on deployment.

These strategic planning concepts have resulted in a series of procurement programs for the Spanish Navy.

== Frigates ==
- F-110 class (5 planned with multi-role capabilities to fulfill both power projection and protection tasks)
  - F-111 Bonifaz (es:Bonifaz (F-111)) (planned 2027)
  - F-112 Roger de Lauria (es:Roger de Lauria (F-112)) (planned 2028)
  - F-113 Menéndez de Avilés (es:Menéndez de Avilés (F-113)) (planned 2029)
  - F-114 Luis de Córdova (es:Luis de Córdova (F-114)) (planned 2030)
  - F-115 Barceló (es:Barceló (F-115)) (planned 2031)

In January 2023, it was announced that Spain would procure the Naval Strike Missile for the ship to carry out anti-ship and land-attack missions. Delivery is anticipated from 2027.

== Submarines ==
- S-80 class (equipped with air independent propulsion for multiple tasks; 1 in service, 3 more planned)
  - S-82 Narciso Monturiol (under construction, planned 2026)
  - S-83 Cosme García (under construction, planned 2028)
  - S-84 Mateo García de los Reyes (under construction, planned 2029)

== Patrol craft ==
- Two offshore patrol vessels (BAM III) were approved for acquisition in 2023 at a cost of 550 million Euros; they are planned for service entry in the mid to latter 2020s
- Based on the Meteoro class for sovereignty protection tasks, a platform is envisaged that will be more survivable and combat capable. Toward that end, Spain is a partner in the European Patrol Corvette program which envisages a vessel for delivery starting in the early 2030s.

== Auxiliary ships ==
- Search and Rescue ship
  - Poseidón (A-21) Meteoro modified class (authorized for construction at a projected cost of 166 million Euros in 2021; she began construction in July 2023 and is planned for delivery in 2026)
- Oceanographic Research ship (2 planned)
- Combat Support Ship (1 vessel planned to complement existing AORs Cantabria and Patiño)
- Diving Support Vessel (EAB), ordered in 2024

== Naval Aviation ==
- In October 2022, the General State Budget allocated EUR220 million (US$216 million) to start the process of replacing both the Air Force's F/A-18 Hornet and the Navy's AV-8B Harrier aircraft. A request for information was sent to the United States Government about both the F-35A and F-35B aircraft. Total projected budget of 6.25 billion Euros was of 2022. However, as of 2025 it was reported that the AV-8B would be unlikely to be replaced in the Spanish Navy after the acquisition of the F-35B fighter was ruled out by the Spanish government. If confirmed, this means that carrier-based fighter operations on the carrier Juan Carlos I will cease in around 2030.
- In 2022, the Defense Security Cooperation Agency (DSCA) authorized the sale of eight MH-60R helicopters to Spain, to replace the SH-60B helicopters of the Tenth Aircraft Squadron. In 2023 the Council of Ministers appropriated 820 million for its acquisition, including engines, missiles and rockets. In the longer-term, the acquisition of the NH-90 helicopter is planned as the Navy's principal multi-purpose helicopter.
- In 2021, 18 H135 "Nival" helicopters were ordered by the Defence Ministry, of which 7 will be allocated to the Navy's newly formed 12th Squadron. The first aircraft was delivered in October 2023.
- In December 2023, the Spanish Ministry of Defence ordered 16 maritime surveillance variants of the C-295 aircraft for the Spanish Air Force and Navy to replace the formerly flown P-3 Orion aircraft. Six of the aircraft are to be equipped for anti-submarine and anti-surface vessel warfare while the remaining ten aircraft are to operate in a maritime surveillance configuration. Deliveries are expected to begin in 2027.

== Future fleet ==
=== On order ===
Class	On order	Picture	Type	Ship	No.	Planned Comm.	Displacement	Notes
Submarines (3)
S-80 class	3 (+ 2 planned)		Attack submarine	Narciso Monturiol	S 82	2026	3,700 tonnes	
S-80 class	3 (+ 2 planned)		Attack submarine	Cosme García	S 83	2028	3,700 tonnes	
S-80 class	3 (+ 2 planned)		Attack submarine	Mateo García de los Reyes	S 84	2030	3,700 tonnes	
Major surface combatants (5)
Bonifaz class "F-110 class"	5 (+2 planned)	Santa Maria-class frigate	Frigate: multi-purpose; anti-submarine	Bonifaz	F111	2026	6,100 tonnes	Using the Aegis combat system. The Spanish Navy's F-110 frigates will receive Saab's naval laser warning system for improved threat detection and survivability
Bonifaz class "F-110 class"	5 (+2 planned)	Santa Maria-class frigate	Frigate: multi-purpose; anti-submarine	Roger de Lauria	F112	2027	6,100 tonnes	Using the Aegis combat system. The Spanish Navy's F-110 frigates will receive Saab's naval laser warning system for improved threat detection and survivability
Bonifaz class "F-110 class"	5 (+2 planned)	Santa Maria-class frigate	Frigate: multi-purpose; anti-submarine	Menéndez de Avilés	F113	2028	6,100 tonnes	Using the Aegis combat system. The Spanish Navy's F-110 frigates will receive Saab's naval laser warning system for improved threat detection and survivability
Bonifaz class "F-110 class"	5 (+2 planned)	Santa Maria-class frigate	Frigate: multi-purpose; anti-submarine	Luis de Córdova	F114	2029	6,100 tonnes	Using the Aegis combat system. The Spanish Navy's F-110 frigates will receive Saab's naval laser warning system for improved threat detection and survivability
Bonifaz class "F-110 class"	5 (+2 planned)	Santa Maria-class frigate	Frigate: multi-purpose; anti-submarine	Barceló	F115	2030	6,100 tonnes	Using the Aegis combat system. The Spanish Navy's F-110 frigates will receive Saab's naval laser warning system for improved threat detection and survivability
Oceanic patrol vessels (2)
Meteoro class "BAM III" (Buque de Acción Marítima)	2	Meteoro class	Offshore patrol vessel	TBD	P-47		2,670 tonnes	
Meteoro class "BAM III" (Buque de Acción Marítima)	2	Meteoro class	Offshore patrol vessel	TBD	P-48		2,670 tonnes	
Rescue and support ships (1)
Meteoro class "BAM-IS"	1	—	Submarine mother ship; diving support vessel; rescue and salvage vessel	Poseidón	A-21	2025	5,000 tonnes	
Hydrographic Survey (2)
BHC (Program name – Buques Hidrográficos Costeros)	2	—	Hydrographic Ships	TBD	TBD	~ 2027	900 tonnes	

=== Planned future fleet ===
Class	Planned	Picture	Type	Ship	No.	Planned Comm.	Displacement.	Notes
Submarines (2)
S-80 class	2		Attack submarine	—	S 85	—	3,700 tonnes	Plan to increase the number of active submarines to 6.
S-80 class	2		Attack submarine	—	S 86	—	3,700 tonnes	Plan to increase the number of active submarines to 6.
Landing Helicopter Docks (2)
Future LHD	2	—	LHD / Aircraft carrier	—	—	—	—	Replacement of the Juan Carlos I, likely to operate F-35B as successor of the Harrier.
Future LHD	2	—	LHD / Aircraft carrier	—	—	—	—	Replacement of the Juan Carlos I, likely to operate F-35B as successor of the Harrier.
Amphibious warfare ships (2)
Potential future amphibious ships	1 or 2	—	Amphibious ship	—	—	—	—	
Potential future amphibious ships	1 or 2	—	Amphibious ship	—	—	—	—	
Auxiliary ships
Replenishment oiler BAC II	1		Replenishment oiler	—	—	—	19,550 tonnes	The new ship will replace the Patiño
Major surface combatants (2)
Bonifaz class "F-110 class"	2	Santa Maria-class frigate	Frigate: multi-purpose; anti-submarine	—	—	—	6,100 tonnes	2 more F-110 planned to be ordered.
Bonifaz class "F-110 class"	2	Santa Maria-class frigate	Frigate: multi-purpose; anti-submarine	—	—	—	6,100 tonnes	2 more F-110 planned to be ordered.
Corvettes (6)
MMPC "Modular and Multirole Patrol Corvette class"	6	—	Multirole corvettes	—	—	—	3,500 tonnes	
MMPC "Modular and Multirole Patrol Corvette class"	6	—	Multirole corvettes	—	—	—	3,500 tonnes	

== See also ==
- List of active Spanish Navy ships
- List of historic Spanish Navy ships
- Future of the United States Navy
- Future of the Royal Navy
- Future of the French Navy
- Future of the Royal Australian Navy
- Future of Brazil Navy
- Future of the Russian Navy
- Future of the Indian Navy
- Future of the Royal Netherlands Navy
