= Salve Marinera =

Official anthem of the Spanish Navy

Song
- Language: Spanish
- English title: Praise song of the seas
- Genre: Hymn
- Composer: Cristóbal Oudrid
- Lyricist: Mariano Méndez Vigo

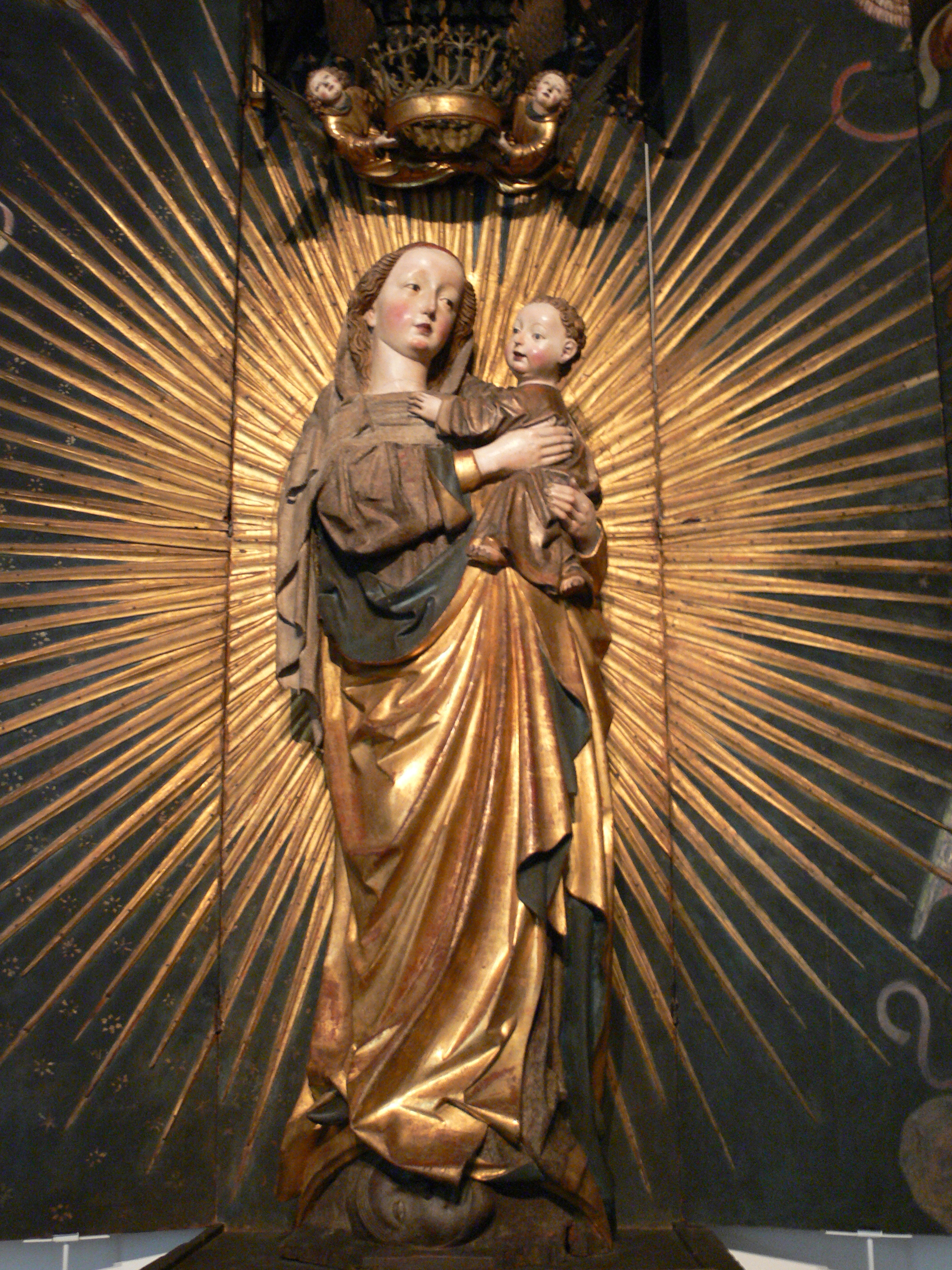
The Virgin Mary as Stella Maris.

Salve Marinera is the official anthem of the Spanish Navy. Its meaning can be loosely translated as "Salutation of the seas" or "Praise song of the seas".

== History ==
The Salve Marinera lyrics and music originated in the zarzuela "El Molinero de Subiza", by Cristóbal Oudrid in 1870. The lyrics of this hymn, written by Mariano Méndez Vigo, are exalting the Virgin Mary as Stella Maris (Our Lady, Star of the Sea). It was adopted by the Spanish Navy as its official anthem towards the end of the 19th century, at an uncertain date.

With the passage of time this anthem has become very popular in nautical theme celebrations throughout coastal areas in Spain. It is sung as one of the highlights of Our Lady of Mount Carmel yearly commemorational festivities by fishermen on July 16. Mostly the singing of the Salve Marinera takes place after a procession carrying the Virgin's image to the church.

== Lyrics ==
Despite its popularity in Catalonia and Galicia, the Salve Marinera has only a Castilian Spanish version; it does not exist in any of the other languages of Spain. The present music accompanying the hymn was adapted in 1942 by Jesús Montalbán Vizcón, then director of the Spanish Navy's training facilities' musical band (Banda de Música de la Escuela Naval).

Salve Marinera
Praise song of the seas
¡Salve! Estrella de los mares,	Hail! Star of the seas,
de los mares iris, de eterna ventura.	Of the gleaming seas, of eternal blessing.
¡Salve! Oh Fénix de hermosura,	Hail! Oh Phoenix of beauty,
Madre del Divino Amor.	Mother of the Divine Love
De tu pueblo, a los pesares	From your people, to their sorrows
Tu clemencia dé consuelo	May your mercy give comfort
Fervoroso llegue al Cielo	Fervently arrive at heaven
y hasta Ti, y hasta Ti nuestro clamor	And unto you, and unto you our cries
¡Salve! ¡Salve! Estrella de los mares	Hail, hail! Star of the ocean,
¡Salve! Estrella de los mares	Hail! Star of the seas
Sí, fervoroso llegue al Cielo	Indeed, fervently arrive at heaven
y hasta Ti, y hasta Ti nuestro clamor	And unto you, and unto you our cries
¡Salve! ¡Salve! Estrella de los mares	Hail, hail! Star of the ocean,
¡Salve! ¡Salve! ¡Salve! Salve!	Hail! Hail! Hail! Hail!

== See also ==
- Spanish Navy
- Stella Maris
- Ave Maris Stella
