= French frigate Amiral Ronarc'h =

First Frégate de défense et d'intervention of French Navy

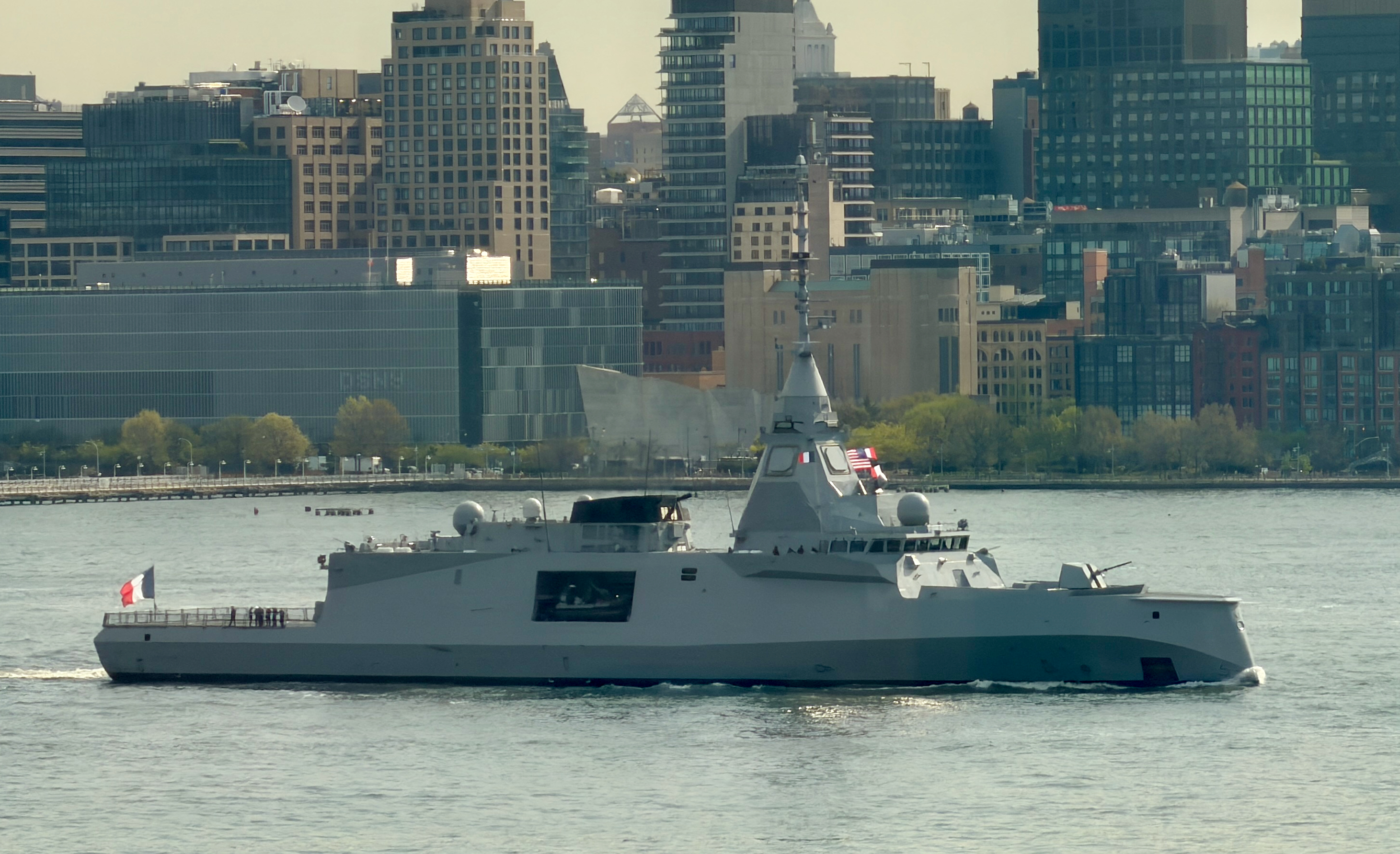
- Amiral Ronarc'h in New York City during her Atlantic deployment in April 2026

History

France
- Name: Amiral Ronarc'h
- Namesake: Pierre Alexis Ronarc'h
- Builder: Naval Group, Lorient
- Laid down: 17 December 2021
- Launched: 7 November 2022
- Acquired: 17 October 2025
- Commissioned: Projected Spring 2027
- Home port: Brest
- Identification: Pennant number: D660
- Status: Post-acceptance sea trials

General characteristics
- Class & type: Amiral Ronarc'h-class frigate
- Displacement: 4,500 t (4,400 long tons)
- Length: 122 m (400 ft 3 in)
- Beam: 17.7 m (58 ft 1 in)
- Propulsion: Combined diesel and diesel (CODAD) arrangement; Total output: 32,000 kW (43,000 shp)
- Speed: 27 knots (50 km/h; 31 mph)
- Range: 5,000 nmi (9,300 km; 5,800 mi) at 15 knots (28 km/h; 17 mph)
- Endurance: 45 days
- Boats & landing craft carried: 2 × RHIB
- Complement: 110 (+15 helicopter detachment)
- Sensors & processing systems: Thales Sea Fire 500 multi-function AESA search/track radar; Aquilon communication & IFF system; SETIS 3.0 CMS; Kingklip Mark II hull sonar; CAPTAS-4 towed sonar
- Electronic warfare & decoys: Thales SENTINEL ESM; CANTO anti-torpedo decoys
- Armament: 1 × Oto Melara 76 mm Super Rapid gun (mounted in stealth turret); 2 × Nexter Narwhal 20 mm RWS; 8 × Exocet MM40 Block 3c SSM; 2 × Sylver A50 8-cell VLS for 16 MBDA Aster 15/30 SAM (eventually to be upgraded to carry 32 VLS tubes for Aster 15/30 SAM); [2 × 2 Sadral Mistral Simbad-RC point-defence SAM (to be retrofit to the frigate in due course)]; 2 × twin torpedo tubes for EuroTorp MU90 Impact torpedoes
- Aircraft carried: 1 × SDAM UAV; 1 × NH90 or Guépard Marine (H160M) helicopter

Amiral Ronarc'h (D660) is a French Navy defence and intervention frigate and the lead ship of her class, launched in 2022 was to be commissioned in 2026, though this was subsequently delayed into early 2027. She is named after Admiral Pierre Alexis Ronarc'h.

== Design and description ==
Amiral Ronarc'h has a length of 122 m (400 ft), a beam of 17.7 m (58 ft), and her displacement is 4,500 t (4,400 long tons). The ship is powered by combined diesel and diesel (CODAD) propulsion with total power output of 32,000 kW (43,000 shp). Her maximum speed is 27 knots (50 km/h), range of 5,000 nautical miles (9,300 km) while cruising at 15 knots (28 km/h), and endurance up to 45 days. The frigate could accommodate 150 personnel, including the usual complement of 110 ship crew and 15 crew for the helicopter detachment.

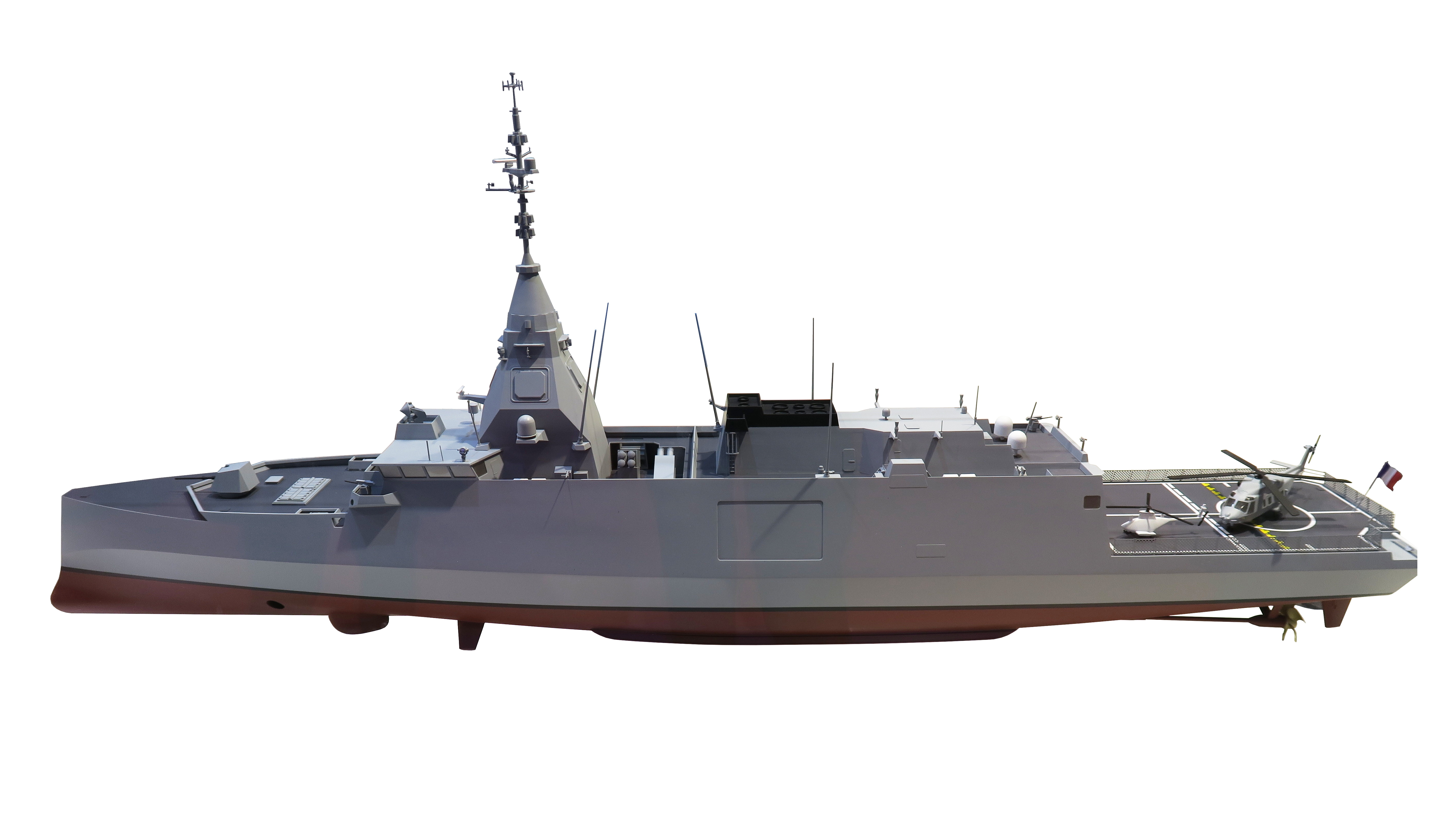
2016 model of a Frégate de défense et d'intervention.

She is armed with one Oto Melara 76 mm Super Rapid gun and two 20 mm Nexter Narwhal remote controlled weapon station. For surface warfare, Amiral Ronarc'h is equipped with eight Exocet MM40 Block 3c anti-ship missiles, and two Sylver A50 8-cell vertical launch system for 16 MBDA Aster 15/30 anti-aircraft missiles. For anti-submarine warfare, she is equipped with two twin 324 mm torpedo tubes for MU90 Impact torpedoes. The ship is also equipped with non-lethal weapon systems for asymmetrical warfare In 2025 it was decided that all frigates of the class were to be upgraded to incorporate 32 VLS cells for Aster 15/30 SAMs, instead of 16, as well as to carry the Mistral Simbad-RC point-defence SAM, in particular for defence against UAVs. The specific timing for these upgrades on Amiral Ronarc'h is yet to be determined.

Her electronic system and sensors consists of Thales Sea Fire 500 multi-function active electronically scanned array search and track radar, Aquilon integrated communication and identification friend or foe system, SETIS 3.0 combat management system, Kingklip Mark II hull-mounted sonar, CAPTAS-4 towed sonar, Thales SENTINEL electronic support measures suite and CANTO anti-torpedo decoys.

Amiral Ronarc'h also has a hangar and flight deck at the stern and could accommodate one SDAM UAV and one NH90 or Guépard Marine (H160M) helicopter equipped with MU90 torpedoes and dipping sonar, air-to-surface missiles, and/or heavy machine gun. The frigate also carries two rigid-hull inflatable boats for patrolling or for a Special Forces purpose.

== Construction and career ==
The construction of the ship was started with the first steel cutting ceremony at the Naval Group shipyard in Lorient on 24 October 2019. Her keel was laid down on 17 December 2021.

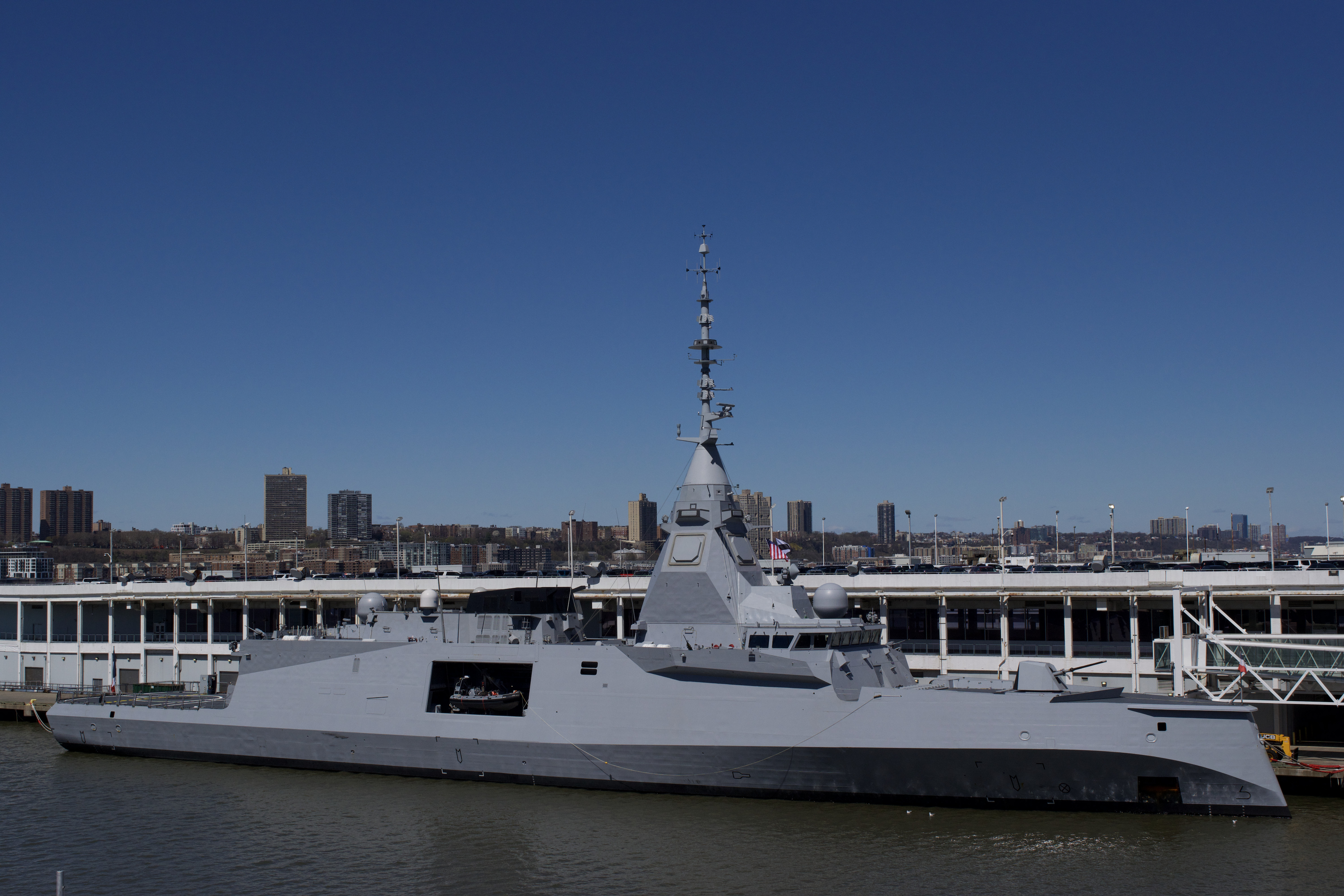
Amiral Ronarc'h docked in New York City during her first deployment

Amiral Ronarc'h was ceremonially launched on 7 November 2022. The ship was partially launched by flooding her construction dock. The frigate was later towed by tugboats to the outfitting pier on the bank of Scorff River. It had been planned to commission Amiral Ronarc'h in 2024. However, delays in her fitting out and the start of sea trials pushed back her delivery into 2025. She began her sea trials in October 2024. In September 2025, the frigate departed the Lorient shipyard for delivery at her home port at Brest. She was expected to undertake a long-term deployment as part of her workup period in early 2026 and then be commissioned toward the middle of the year (however this was subsequently delayed into 2027).

In October 2025, Amiral Ronarc'h received her first at-sea replenishment from the support ship Somme.

In January 2026, the ship began a "several month" deployment to the high north and western Atlantic. In May 2026, she returned to her home port after 123 days, during which she proved her seakeeping in extreme cold and participated in Exercise Orion 26 as part of the French Carrier Strike Group.
