= Integrated Unmanned Ground System =

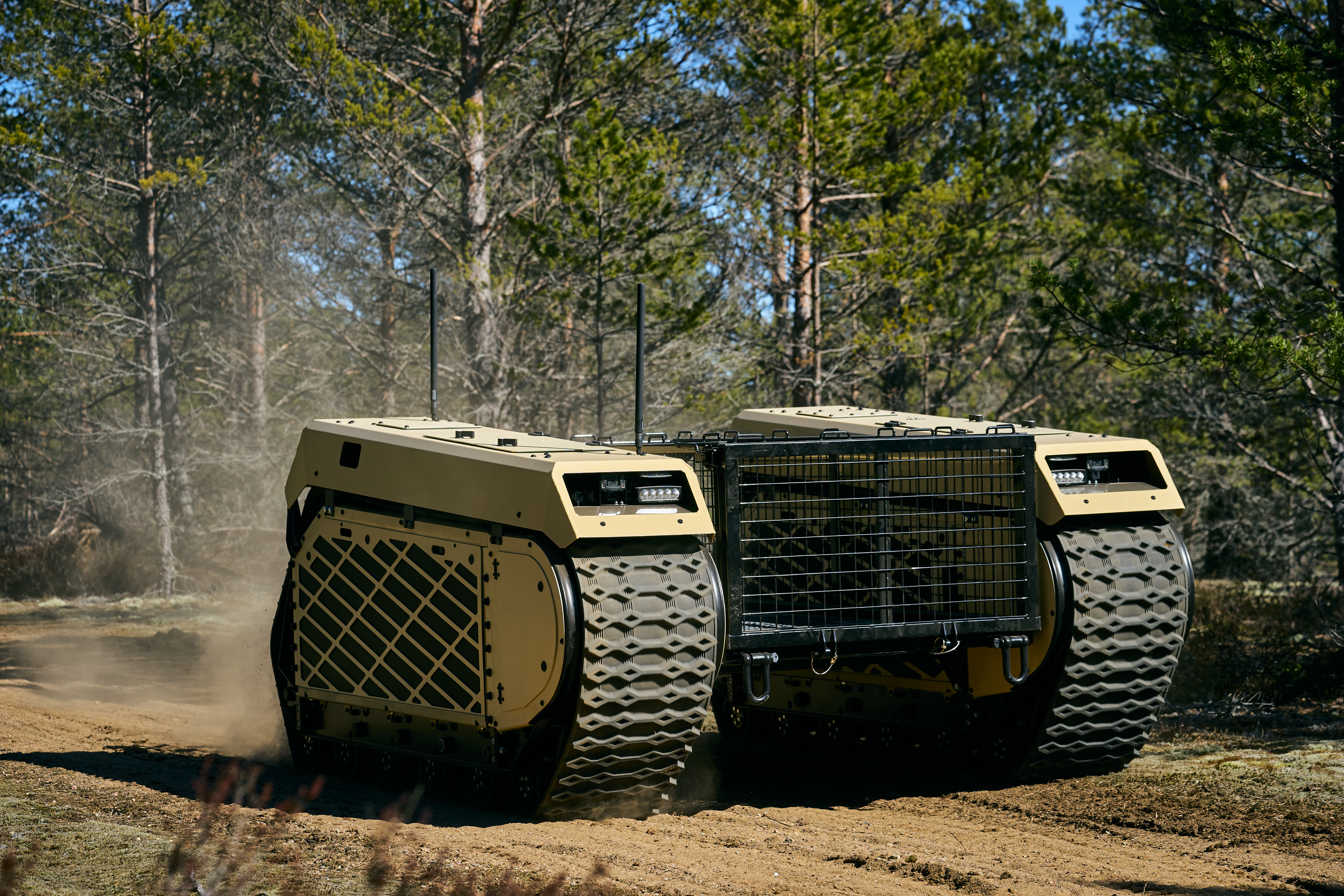
- THeMIS that will be used as basis for the iMUGS (not representative of the final iMUGS design)
- Type: Unmanned ground vehicle
- Place of origin: European Union

Service history
- Used by: Belgian Land Component; Czech Land Forces; Estonian Land Forces; French Army; Finnish Army; German Army; Hungarian Ground Forces; Latvian Land Forces; Royal Netherlands Army; Polish Land Forces; Spanish Army

Production history
- Manufacturer: 14 European companies: Milrem Robotics; GT Cyber Technologies; Safran Electronics & Defense; NEXTER Systems; Krauss-Maffei Wegmann; Diehl Defence; Bittium Wireless; Insta DefSec; (Un)Manned; dotOcean; Latvijas Mobilais Telefons; GMV Aerospace and Defence; Estonian Military Academy; Royal Military Academy of Belgium
- Produced: Demonstration planned 2021

Integrated Modular Unmanned Ground System (UGS or iMUGS) is a European Union's Permanent Structured Cooperation (PESCO) project that aims to create a European standard unmanned ground system and develop scalable modular architecture for hybrid crewed-uncrewed systems, as well as increasing interoperability, situational awareness and speeding up decision making. The project is coordinated by Estonia, with 10 other European countries participating. It will use Milrem's existing THeMIS unmanned ground vehicle for different payloads.

The total cost of the programme is €32.6m, of which €30.6m was funded by the European Commission (EDIDP) and the remaining €2m by the participating countries collectively. The aim of the EDIDP programme is to strengthen the strategic autonomy of the European Union and the co-operation between member countries.

The project results will be shown in operational environments as part of military exercises or at separate testing events, the first demonstration is scheduled for Q2 2021 in Estonia, with later demonstrations planned in each member state. In October 2022 the project was demonstrated in french Versailles. Uncrewed, autonomous groundsystems where performing a diversity of defence missions, such as reconnaissance, evacuation and replenishment. Safran and Nexter were leading the presentation. Further demonstrations were held in german Lehnin in December of that year.

== Objectives ==
Goal of the project is to build and demonstrate a system of uncrewed ground and airborne vehicles that can perform a variety of surveillance and rescue tasks and standardise a European ecosystem for aerial and ground platforms, command, control and communications, sensors, payloads, and algorithms. The ethical aspects of robotics, artificial intelligence, and autonomous systems will be taken into account, Milrem said the system being developed would be under “meaningful human control”.

Requirements set by 7 members:

- Autonomy
- Cyber Security
- Communications & Vehicle to vehicle
- Command & Control, Interoperability
- Modular Standardized Open Architecture
- Swarming
- Crewed-Uncrewed Teaming & Operational Scenarios

Capabilities:

- Multi-mission capable platform to carry different payloads (transport, ISR, tethered UAV etc.) and sensors
- Cyber secure autonomous navigation capability for route and mission planning with different options for crewed-uncrewed teaming
- EW resilient Command & Control interface capable of swarming and interoperable with existing C4 systems

== Members ==
- Estonia - Project Coordinator
- Belgium
- Czech Republic
- France
- Finland
- Germany
- Hungary
- Latvia
- Netherlands
- Poland
- Spain

== Participating companies ==
14 companies from across Europe are cooperating on the project:

- (Estonia) Milrem Robotics
- (Estonia) GT Cyber Technologies
- (Estonia) Estonian Military Academy
- (France) Safran Electronics & Defense
- (France) NEXTER Systems
- (Germany) Krauss-Maffei Wegmann
- (Germany) Diehl Defence
- (Latvia) Latvijas Mobilais Telefons
- (Finland) Bittium
- (Finland) Insta DefSec
- (Spain) GMV Aerospace and Defence will be coordinator of the command and control and C4ISR interoperability subproject
- (Belgium) (UN)MANNED will develop the certifiable ground control station allowing one operator to control a large fleet of unmanned systems (Unmanned Aerial Vehicles and Unmanned Ground Vehicles).
- Royal Military Academy of Belgium will lead the sub-project on swarming, developing capabilities, enabling heterogeneous teams of robots to work as a group towards a common objective.
- (Belgium) dotOcean is member of the swarming team and develops algorithms to enable teamwork and cooperation in a fleet of networked robots.

== See also ==
- Common Security and Defence Policy
  - Permanent Structured Cooperation
    - European Main Battle Tank
    - European Patrol Corvette
    - Eurocopter Tiger
  - European External Action Service
