= Spanish Navy =

Naval warfare branch of Spain's military

- Armada Española
- Emblem of the Spanish Navy
- Founded: 15th century
- Country: Spain
- Type: Navy
- Size: 25,449 personnel (2025); 139 ships 54 aircraft
- Part of: Spanish Armed Forces
- Garrison/HQ: Headquarters: Spanish Navy Headquarters, Madrid Main naval bases: Naval Station of Rota; Arsenal de Ferrol; Arsenal de Cartagena; Mahón Naval Station; Arsenal de Las Palmas; Arsenal de La Carraca; Naval Military School of Marín
- Patron: Our Lady of Mount Carmel (Spanish: Nuestra Señora del Carmen)
- March: Himno de la Escuela Naval (José María Pemán)
- Anniversaries: 16 July
- Website: www.armada.mde.es

Commanders
- Commander in Chief: King Felipe VI
- Admiral Chief of the Naval Staff: Admiral general Antonio Piñeiro Sánchez

Insignia
- Jack

- Ensign

Aircraft flown
- Attack: McDonnell Douglas EAV-8B Harrier II+
- Fighter: McDonnell Douglas EAV-8B Harrier II+
- Helicopter: Sikorsky SH-60B Seahawk
- Cargo helicopter: Sikorsky SH-60F Seahawk
- Multirole helicopter: Agusta Bell AB-212+
- Trainer helicopter: Airbus H135
- Reconnaissance: Boeing Institu ScanEagle
- Trainer: McDonnell Douglas TAV-8B Harrier II
- Transport: Cessna Citation

The Spanish Navy, officially the Armada, is the maritime branch of the Spanish Armed Forces and one of the oldest active naval forces in the world. The Spanish Navy was responsible for a number of major historic achievements in navigation, the most famous being the discovery of the Americas and the first global circumnavigation, and participation in some of the most important naval battles in history, like the battles of Lepanto and Trafalgar. For several centuries, the Spanish Navy played a crucial logistical role in the exploration, expansion and consolidation of the Spanish Empire, and defended a vast trade network across the Atlantic Ocean and across the Pacific Ocean.

The Spanish Navy was one of the most powerful maritime forces in the world from the late 15th century to the end of the 18th century. In the early 19th century, with the loss of most of its empire, the Spanish navy transitioned to a much smaller fleet but it still maintained a significant shipbuilding capability and produced the first fully capable military submarine. In this time, the Spanish navy also contributed to the development of the destroyer class of warship and achieved the first global circumnavigation by an ironclad vessel.

The main bases of the Spanish Navy are at Rota, Ferrol, San Fernando and Cartagena.

== History ==
=== Origins: the Middle Ages ===
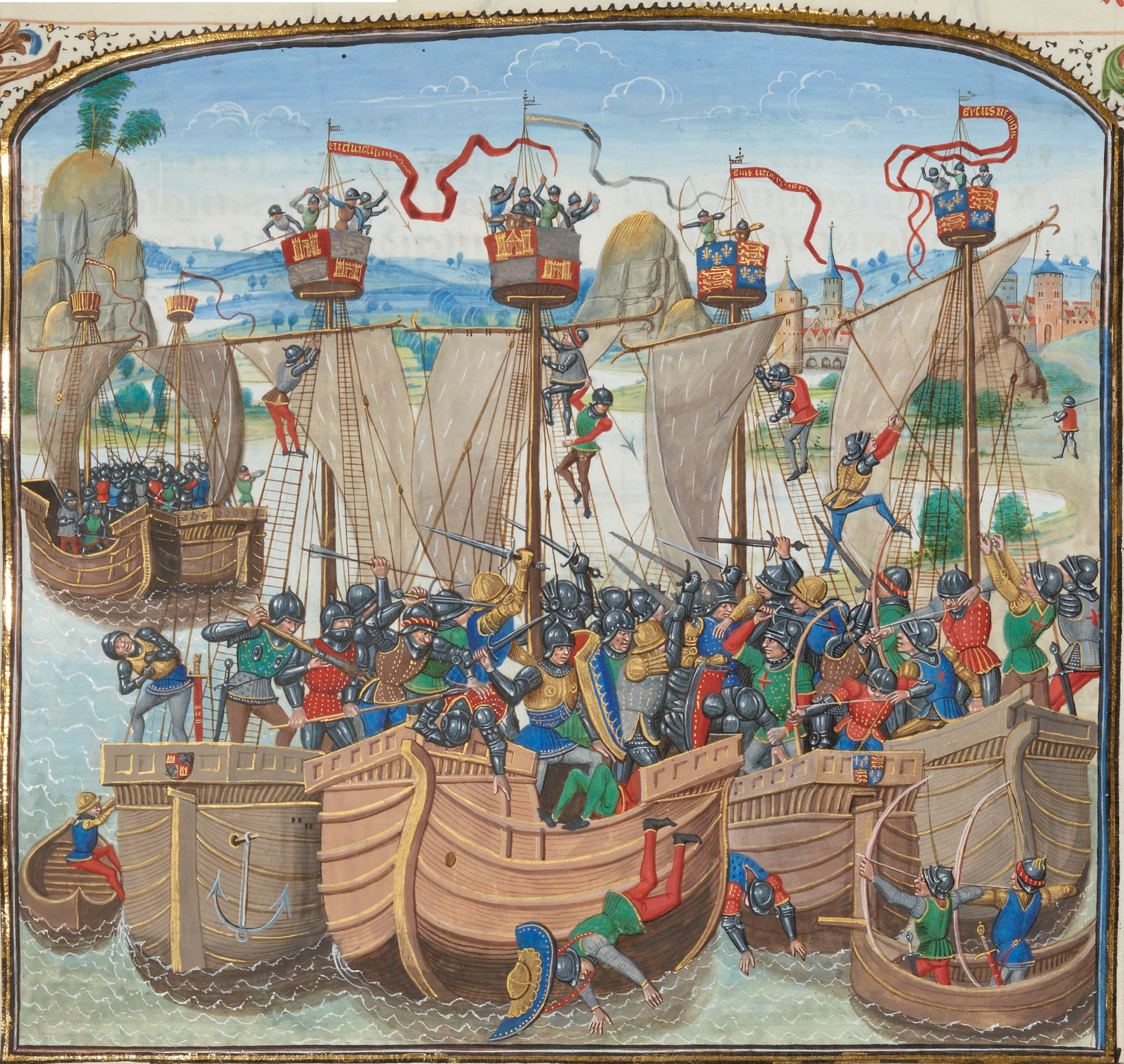
The Battle of La Rochelle, 1372

The roots of the modern Spanish Navy date back to before the unification of Spain. By the late Middle Ages, the two principal kingdoms that would later combine to form Spain, Aragon and Castile, had developed powerful fleets. Aragon possessed the third largest navy in the late medieval Mediterranean, although its capabilities were exceeded by those of Venice and (until overtaken in the 15th century by those of Aragon) Genoa. In the 14th and 15th centuries, these naval capabilities enabled Aragon to assemble the largest collection of territories of any European power in the Mediterranean, encompassing the Balearics, Sardinia, Sicily, southern Italy and, briefly, the Duchy of Athens.

Castile meanwhile used its naval capacities to conduct its Reconquista operations against the Moors, capturing Cádiz in 1232 and also to help the French Crown against England in the Hundred Years' War. In 1375, a Castilian fleet destroyed a large English fleet at Bourgneuf, and Castilian ships raided the English coast. As Castile developed long-lasting trade relationships with towns in the Low Countries of the Netherlands and Flanders, the English Channel virtually became the "Spanish Channel." In 1402, a Castilian expedition led by Juan de Bethencourt conquered the Canary Islands for Henry III of Castile. In 1419, the Castilians defeated the German Hanseatic League at sea and excluded them from the Bay of Biscay.

In the 15th century, Castile entered into a race of exploration with Portugal, the country that inaugurated the European Age of Discovery. In 1492, two caravels and a carrack, commanded by Christopher Columbus, arrived in America, on an expedition that sought a westward oceanic passage across the Atlantic, to the Far East. This began the era of trans-oceanic trade routes, pioneered by the Spanish in the seas to the west of Europe and the Portuguese to the east.

=== The Habsburg era ===
Commemorative plaque at San Fernando's Panteón de los Marinos Ilustres, depicting a list of victories of the Armadas of Spain List of Victories Conquest of Majorca 1229 Conquest of Menorca 1232 Conquest of Ibiza 1234 Conquest of Seville 1248 Battle of Malta 1283 Combat of Sorrento 1284 Battle of Castellamare 1287 Battle of Cape St. Vincent 1337 Battle of La Rochelle 1371 Combat of Gibraltar 1407 Battle of La Rochelle 1419 Conquest of the Canary Islands 1484 Conquest of Malaga 1487 Conquest of Oran 1509 Conquest of Tunis 1535 Battle of Muros Bay 1544 Conquest of Velez 1584 Battle of Lepanto 1571 Battle of Ponta Delgada 1582 Disembarkation of Terceira Island 1583 Spanish landing on Ireland 1602 Battle of Saint Vincent 1603? Battle of Playa Honda 1617 Battle de Pernambuco 1621 Combate de Las Antillas 1629 Batalla de los Abrojos 1631 Battles of La Naval de Manila 1649 Conquest of Sardinia 1717 Battle of Cartagena de Indias 1741 Battle of Toulon 1744 Battle of the Azores 1780 Siege of Pensacola 1781 Reconquest of Buenos Aires 1806 Battle of Cadiz 1808 Siege of Cádiz 1810 – 1812 Bombardeo del Callao 1866 Landing on Alhucemas 1925 Battle of the Strait 1936 Cantabrian campaign 1936 – 1939 Campaign of the Mediterranean 1936 – 1939

Following the discovery of America and the settlement of certain Caribbean islands, such as Cuba, Spanish conquistadors Hernán Cortés and Francisco Pizarro were carried by the Spanish Navy to the mainland, where they conquered the Aztec Empire and the Inca Empire respectively. The navy also carried explorers to the North American mainland, including Juan Ponce de León and Álvarez de Pineda, who discovered Florida (1519) and Texas (1521) respectively. In 1519, Spain sent out the first expedition of world circumnavigation in history, which was put in the charge of the Portuguese Commander Ferdinand Magellan. Following the death of Magellan in the Philippines, the expedition was completed under the command of Juan Sebastián Elcano in 1522. In 1565, a follow-on expedition by Miguel López de Legazpi was carried by the navy from New Spain (Mexico) to the Philippines via Guam to establish the Spanish East Indies, a base for trade with the Orient. For two and a half centuries, the Manila galleons operated across the Pacific linking Manila and Acapulco. Until the early 17th century, the Pacific Ocean was dominated by the Spanish Navy. Aside from the Marianas and Caroline Islands, several naval expeditions also discovered the Tuvalu archipelago, the Marquesas, the Solomon Islands and New Guinea in the South Pacific. In the quest for Terra Australis, Spanish explorers in the 17th century also discovered the Pitcairn and Vanuatu archipelagos. Most significantly, from 1565 Spanish fleets explored and colonised the Philippine archipelago, the Spanish East Indies.

After the unification of its kingdoms under the House of Habsburg, Spain maintained two largely separate fleets, one consisting chiefly of galleys for use in the Mediterranean and the other of sailing ships for the Atlantic, successors to the Aragonese and Castilian navies respectively. This arrangement continued until superseded by the decline of galley warfare during the 17th century. The completion of the Reconquista with the conquest of the Kingdom of Granada in 1492 had been followed by naval expansion in the Mediterranean, where Spain seized control of almost every significant port along the coast of North Africa west of Cyrenaica, notably Melilla (captured 1497), Mers El Kébir (1505), Oran (1509), Algiers (1510) and Tripoli (1510), which marked the furthest point of this advance. However, the hinterlands of these ports remained under the control of their Muslim and Berber inhabitants, and the expanding naval power of the Ottoman Empire brought about a major Islamic counter-offensive, which embroiled Spain in decades of intense warfare for control of the Mediterranean. (Note: Algiers and Tripoli would be lost to the Ottomans later in the 16th century causing piracy problems.) The war saw cooperation with the Republic of Genoa under the leadership of Andrea Doria, while the Ottomans found an ally in France. In its course, the Spanish under Álvaro de Bazán the Elder would defeat the French in the first large modern battle in the Atlantic in Muros Bay.

The Spanish navy was completely reorganized under King Philip II, who disposed of the traditionally semi-private armada operated by Spain. In the Atlantic, Spanish ships had been exclusively private vessels sailing under charter, while in the Mediterranean, the kingdom owned directly only small numbers of ships, hiring the rest by contract (asiento) from players who acted as both shipbuilders and admirals, chiefly Doria and Bazán the Elder. The disaster of Djerba in 1560 forcefully changed this landscape, driving Philip to initiate a building program which produced and maintained 300 galleys in fourteen years, roughly quadrupling the naval power his father Charles V had enjoyed. In the Atlantic Ocean, similar attempts to form a royal navy peaked after the incorporation of Portugal to the Spanish monarchy, leading to the creation of a strong, 100-vessel armada by the 1580s. Attacks of foreign privateers also caused the emergence of a system of bi-annual convoys, where ships crossing to America would only do so as part of grand fleets to facilitate defense.

From the 1570s, the lengthy Dutch Revolt increasingly challenged Spanish sea power, producing powerful rebel naval forces that attacked Spanish shipping and in time made Spain's sea communications with its possessions in the Low Countries difficult. Most notable of these attacks was the Battle of Gibraltar in 1607, in which a Dutch squadron destroyed a fleet of galleons at anchor in the confines of the bay. This naval war took on a global dimension with actions in the Caribbean and the Far East, notably around the Philippines. Spain's response to its problems included the encouragement of privateers based in the Spanish Netherlands and known from their main base as Dunkirkers, who preyed on Dutch merchant ships and fishing trawlers.

The Battle of Lepanto, 1571

The armada suffered a defeat against the Ottomans in the Battle of Djerba, but its position recovered relatively quick, decisively repelling a large Franco-Ottoman siege of Oran and achieving reconquest of the Peñón de Vélez de la Gomera. After executing the relief of the Great Siege of Malta, Spain was part of the Holy League along with Venice, the Papal States and other Christian allies, inflicting a great defeat on the Ottoman Navy in the Battle of Lepanto (1571) and stopping Muslim forces from gaining uncontested control of the eastern Mediterranean. The Ottomans rebuild their fleet and faced the Holy Fleet again in the skirmish at Cerigo Channel the following year, but withdrew with damage and avoided direct battle from that point.

In 1580, after a successful amphibious campaign by Álvaro de Bazán the Younger, Spain entered a dynastic union with Portugal, reaching the apex of its naval power as a result of the combined might of its navy with the Portuguese navy, and effectively becoming the most powerful maritime force in the world.

In the 1580s, the conflict in the Netherlands drew England into war with Spain, creating a further menace to Spanish shipping. The effort to neutralise this threat led to a disastrous attempt to invade England in 1588, however, the disaster of the English Armada the following year managed to return the balance between the belligerents. The defeat of 1588 led to a reform of fleet operations. The navy at this time was not a single operation but consisted of various fleets, made up mainly of armed merchantmen with escorts of royal ships. The Armada fiasco marked a turning point in naval warfare, where gunnery was now more important than ramming and boarding and so Spanish ships were equipped with purpose built naval guns. During the 1590s, the expansion of these fleets allowed a great increase in overseas trade and a massive increase in the importation of luxuries and silver. Nevertheless, inadequate port defences allowed an Anglo-Dutch force to raid Cádiz in 1596, and though unsuccessful in its objective of capturing the silver from the just returned convoy, was able to inflict great damage upon the city. Port defences at Cádiz were upgraded and all attempts to repeat the attack in the following centuries would fail.

Meanwhile, Spanish ships were able to step up operations in the English Channel, the North Sea and towards Ireland. They were able to capture many enemy ships, merchant and military, in the early decades of the 17th century and provide military supplies to Spanish armies in France and the Low Countries and to Irish rebels in Ireland. In the early 17th century Spanish fleets organized by the Duke of Osuna inflicted major defeats on Ottoman Empire in the Battle of Cape Corvo and Cape Gelidonya, the latter of which demonstrated the now growing gap between western and eastern navies, along with a raid on Constantinople. The Barbary corsairs in the service of the Ottoman Empire would gradually become only a civilian threat after being bested in battles like Gulf of Tunis and Dalmatia and multiple raids on the Ottoman Tunisia. These battles stabilised the situation on the eastern Mediterranean front, while in the Spanish Netherlands the allied privateers and local armada under Francisco de Ribera would successfully disrupt Dutch maritime trade. However, in 1639, an attempt to change their strategy to direct action led to a Dutch fleet under Maarten Tromp decisively defeating a large Spanish fleet in the Battle of the Downs, putting an end to Spanish operations in northern waters.

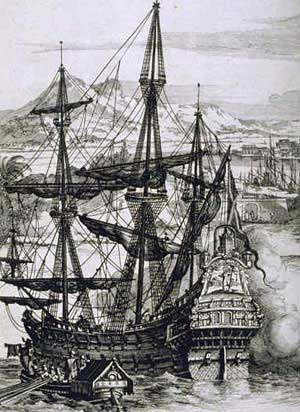
A 17th-century Spanish galleon

By the middle of the 17th century, Spain had been drained by the vast strains of the Thirty Years' and related wars and began to slip into a slow decline. During the middle to late decades of the century, the Dutch, English and French were able to take advantage of Spain's shrinking, run-down and increasingly underequipped fleets. Military priorities in continental Europe meant that naval affairs were increasingly neglected. The Dutch took control of the smaller islands of the Caribbean, while England conquered Jamaica and France the western part of Santo Domingo. These territories became bases for raids on Spanish New World ports and shipping by pirates and privateers. The Spanish concentrated their efforts in keeping the most important islands, such as Cuba, Puerto Rico and the majority of Santo Domingo, while the system of treasure fleets, despite being greatly diminished, was rarely defeated in safely conveying its freight of silver and Asian luxuries across the Atlantic to Europe. Only two such convoys were ever lost to enemy action with their cargo, one to a Dutch fleet in 1628 and another to an English fleet in 1656. A third convoy was destroyed at anchor by another English attack in 1657, but it had already unloaded its treasure.

By the time of the wars of the Grand Alliance (1688–97) and the Spanish Succession (1702–14), the Habsburg regime had decided that it was more cost effective to rely on allied fleets, Anglo-Dutch and French respectively, than to invest in its own fleets. Around this time, a service of defensive privateering based on America named guarda costa was established.

=== The Bourbon era ===
The War of the Spanish Succession arose after the establishment on the Spanish throne of a House of Bourbon king, following the extinction of the Spanish Habsburg line. The internal division between supporters of a Habsburg and those of a Bourbon king led to a civil war and ultimately to the loss of Sicily, Sardinia, Menorca and Gibraltar. Gibraltar and Menorca were captured by Anglo-Dutch forces fighting under the Spanish flag of Habsburg contender Charles VI. Menorca was ultimately surrendered to Spain years later. At the end of the War of Spanish Succession, Spain's possessions in the Low Countries and mainland Italy were ceded to Austria.

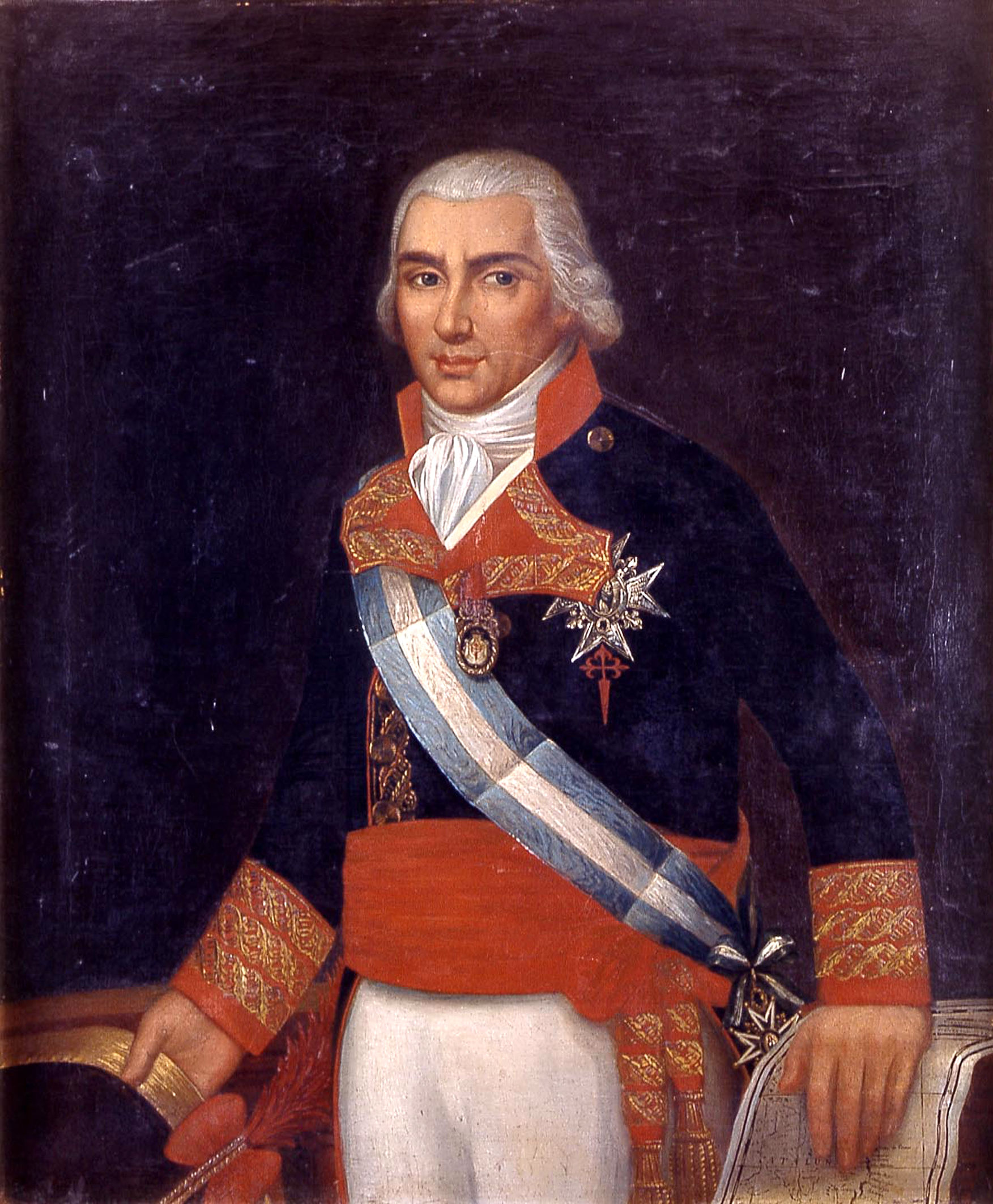
Federico Gravina, one of the Spanish heroes of the Battle of Trafalgar

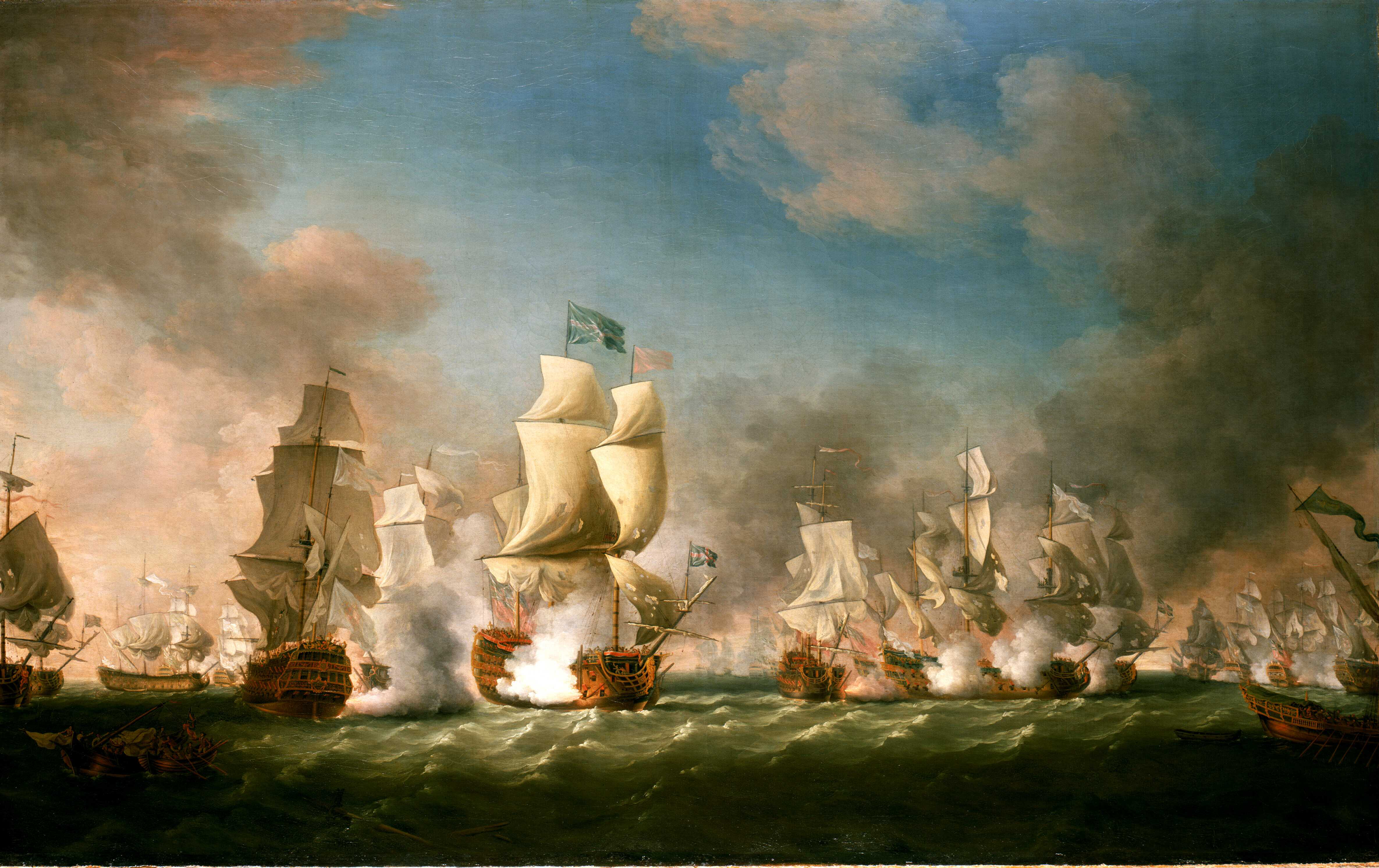
A painting of the Battle of Cape Passaro by Richard Paton

Attempting to reverse the losses of the previous war, in the War of the Quadruple Alliance (1718–20) the Spanish Navy successfully convoyed armies to invade Sicily and Sardinia, but the poorly maintained escort fleet was destroyed by the British in the Battle of Cape Passaro and the Spanish invasion army was defeated in Italy by the Austrians. A major program to renovate and reorganise the run-down navy was begun. A secretaría (ministry) of the army and navy had been established by the Bourbon regime as early as 1714; which centralized the command and administration of the different fleets. Following the war of Quadruple Alliance, a program of rigorous standardization was introduced in ships, operations, and administration. Given the needs of its empire, Spanish warship designs tended to be more orientated towards long-range escort and patrol duties than for battle. A major reform of the Spanish Navy was initiated, updating its ships and administration, which was helped by French and Italian experts, although Spaniards, most notably Antonio de Gaztañeta and Jorge Juan, soon rose to prominence in this work, which made Spain a leader in warship design and quality again, as was demonstrated by ships like Princesa. A major naval yard was established at Havana, enabling the navy to maintain a permanent force in the Americas for the defence of the colonies and the suppression of piracy and smuggling, complemented by guarda costa privateers. In metropolitan Spain, significant forest reconnaissance operations were regularly undertaken by Spanish naval officers to seek out sources of timber suitable for shipbuilding.

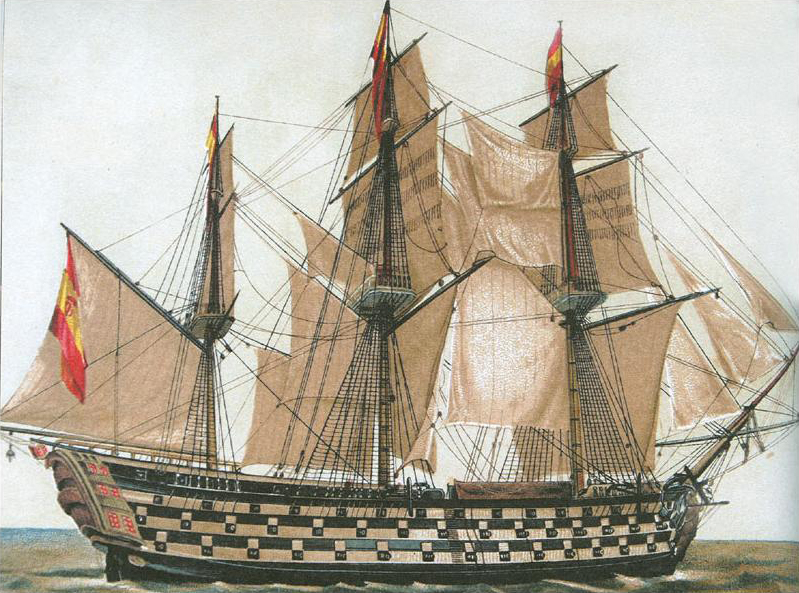
Navío or ship-of-the-line, Santa Ana, 1784–1814

During the War of the Polish Succession (1733–38), a renewed attempt to regain the lost Italian territories for the Bourbon dynasty was successful; with the French as allies and the British and Dutch neutral, Spain launched a campaign by sea and retook Sicily and southern Italy from Austria. In the War of Jenkins' Ear, the navy showed it was able to maintain communications with the American colonies and resupply Spanish forces in Italy in the face of British naval opposition. The navy played an important part in the decisive Battle of Cartagena de Indias in modern-day Colombia, where a massive British invasion fleet and army were defeated by a smaller Spanish force commanded by able strategist Blas de Lezo. This Spanish victory prolonged Spain's supremacy in the Americas until the early 19th century. The program of naval renovation was continued and by the 1750s the Spanish navy had outstripped the Dutch to become the third most powerful in the world, behind only those of Britain and France.

Joining France against Britain near the end of the Seven Years' War (1756–63), the navy failed to prevent the British capturing Havana, during which the Spanish squadron present was also captured. In the American War of Independence (1775–83), the Spanish Navy was essential to the establishment, in combination with the French and Dutch navies, of a numerical advantage that stretched British naval resources. They played a vital role, along with the French and Dutch, in maintaining military supplies to the American rebels. The navy also played a key role in the Spanish Army-led operations that defeated the British in Florida. The bulk of the purely naval combat on the allied side fell to the French Navy, although Spain achieved lucrative successes with the capture of two great British convoys meant for the resupply of British forces and loyalists in North America. Joint operations with France resulted in the capture of Menorca but failed in the siege of Gibraltar. This time also marked the creation of fuerzas sutiles, a long-lasting and successful policy based on gunboats and small vessels armed with heavy artillery.

Having initially opposed France in the French Revolutionary Wars (1792–1802), Spain changed sides in 1796, but defeat by the British a few months later in the Battle of Cape St. Vincent (1797) and Trinidad (1798) was followed by the blockade of the main Spanish fleet in Cádiz. The run down of naval operations had as much to do with the confused political situation in Spain as it had to do with the blockade. The British blockade of Spain's ports was of limited success and an attempt to attack Cádiz was defeated; ships on special missions and convoys successfully evaded the Cádiz blockade and other ports continued to operate with little difficulty, but the main battle fleets were largely inactive. The blockade was lifted with the Peace of Amiens 1802. The war recommenced in 1804 and ended in 1808 when the Spain and the United Kingdom became allied against Napoleon. As in the first part, Cádiz was blockaded and Spanish naval activity was minimal. The most notable event was Spanish involvement in the Battle of Trafalgar under French leadership. This resulted in the Spanish Navy losing eleven ships-of-the-line or over a quarter of its line-of-battle ships. After Spain became allied with the United Kingdom in 1808 in its war of independence, the Spanish Navy joined the war effort against Napoleon, beginning with the capture of a French squadron of warships.

=== 19th century ===
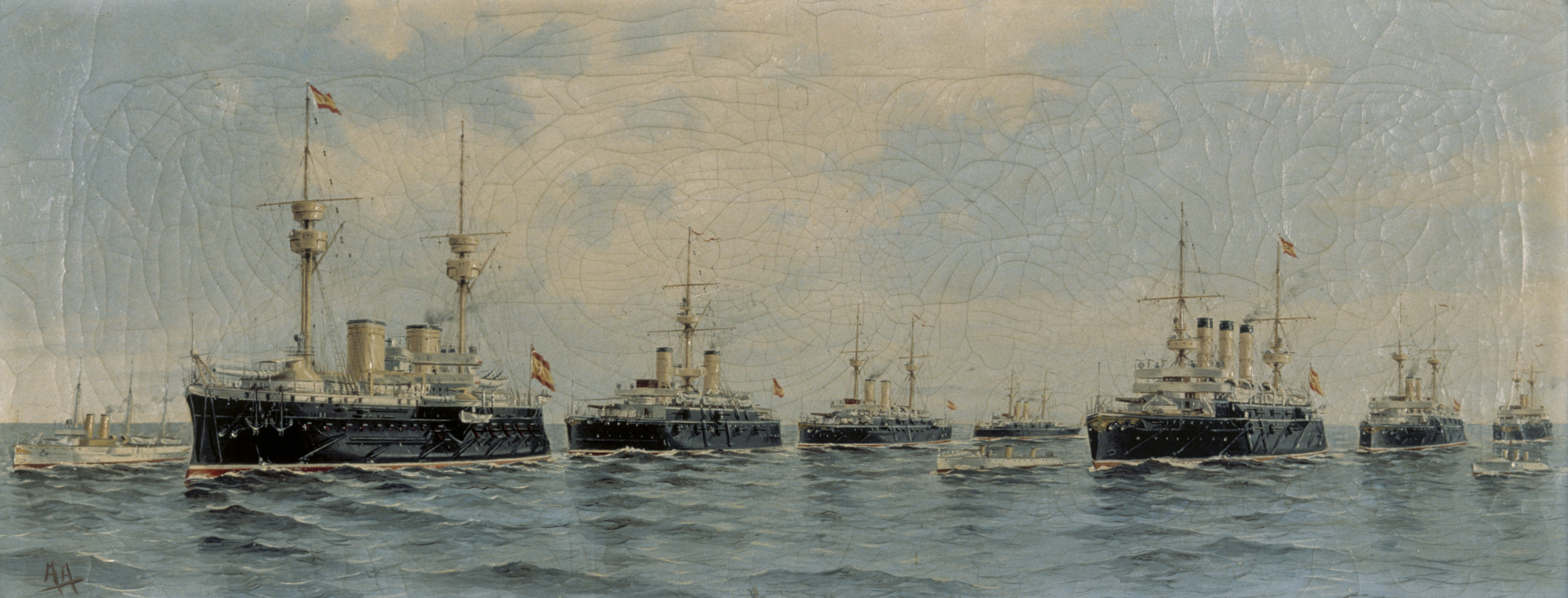
c. 1897 painting of several Spanish warships off Ferrol

The 1820s saw the loss of most of the Spanish Empire. With the empire reduced to a fraction of its former size and Spain itself politically unstable after the devastating years of Napoleonic intervention, the already greatly rundown navy lost its importance and became a shadow of its pre-Napoleonic self. The first effects of the industrial revolution upon the Spanish navy arrived in the form of a steam-driven warship Isabel II, a converted cargo vessel, purchased from the United Kingdom in 1834. However the Spanish navy remained neglected in this period. In the 1850s and 1860s, particularly under prime minister General O'Donnell, significant investments were made in the Spanish naval squadrons of the Pacific. A new steam-powered naval squadron sailed around the Pacific escorting a Spanish scientific expedition and unfortunately became entangled in what has been billed the First War of the Pacific from 1864 to 1871. During the conflict, the Spanish massed a fleet of 15 vessels to combat the combined navies of Peru, Chile, and Ecuador.

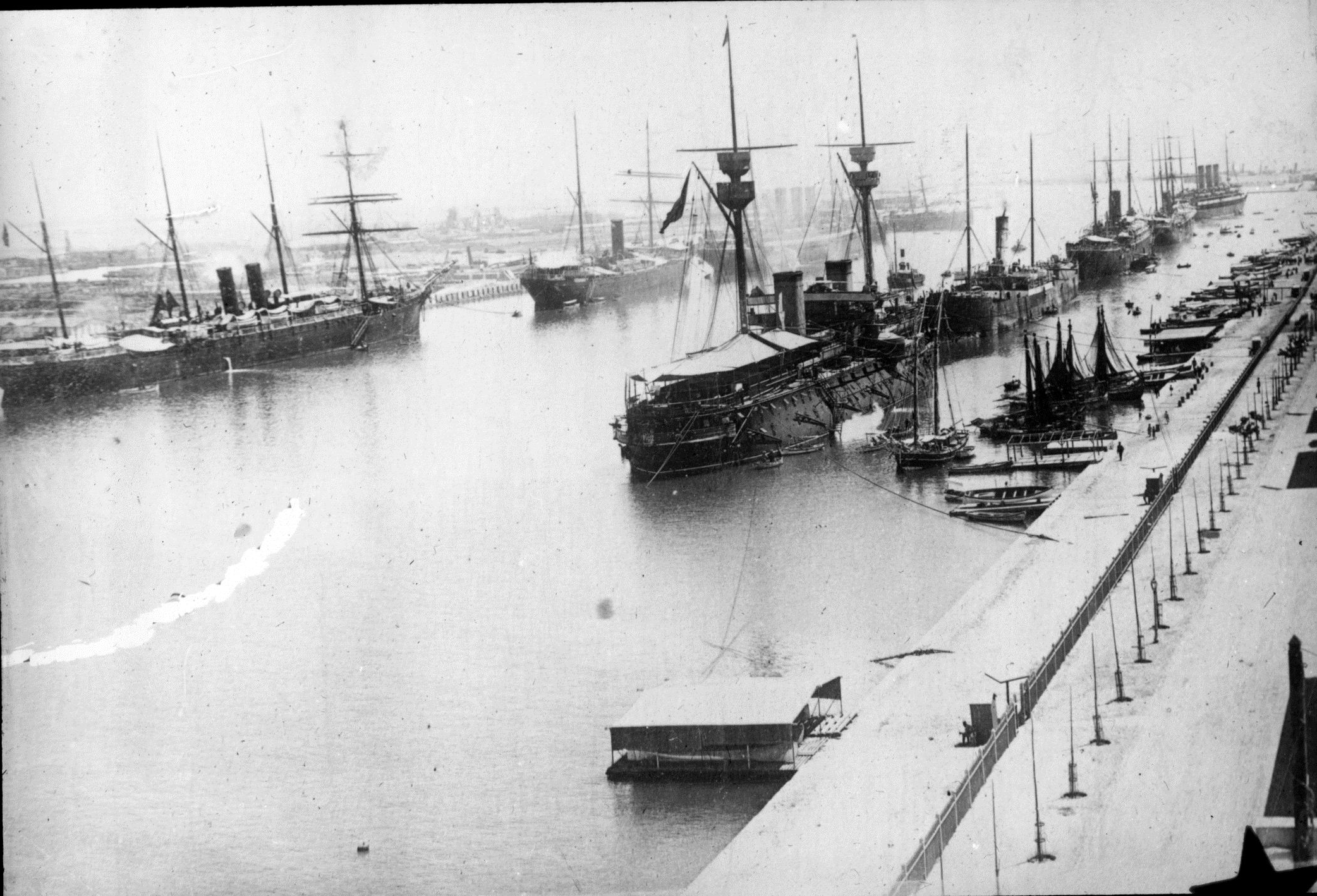
Spanish fleet of Admiral Cámara anchored in the Suez Canal 1898, formed among others by the battleship Pelayo or cruiser Emperador Carlos V and that ultimately did not intervene in the Spanish–American War.

The 1890s saw the Spanish Navy gain several armored cruisers—important for maintaining connection with the Spanish Empire's remaining colonies—including the Emperador Carlos V. As of 1896, according to the plans of Admiral José María Beránger, there were three naval divisions based at Cádiz, Ferrol, and Cartagena. Each division was composed of ironclads, in addition to auxiliary squadrons for defense of the Spanish coastline. That year the Armada consisted of one battleship, eight cruisers of the first class, six of the second class, and nine of the third class, as well as 38 torpedo craft. There were an additional ten vessels under construction. As of 1896 there were 1,002 officers in the navy, along with 725 mechanics, 14,000 sailors, and 9,000 marines. Their numbers were maintained by conscription of the seafaring population.

During the Spanish–American War in 1898, a badly supported and equipped Spanish fleet of four armored cruisers and two destroyers was overwhelmed by numerically and technically superior forces (three new battleships, one new second-class battleship, and one large armored cruiser) as it tried to break out of an American blockade in the Battle of Santiago de Cuba. Admiral Cervera's squadron was overrun in an attempt to break a powerful American blockade off Cuba. In the Philippines, a squadron, made up of aging ships, including some obsolete cruisers, had already been sacrificed in a token gesture in Manila Bay. The Battle of Manila Bay took place on 1 May 1898. The American Asiatic Squadron under Commodore George Dewey engaged and destroyed the Spanish Pacific Squadron under Admiral Patricio Montojo y Pasarón. The engagement took place in Manila Bay in the Philippines, and was the first major engagement of the Spanish–American War. This war marked the end for the Spanish Navy as a global maritime force.

At the end of the 19th century, the Spanish Navy adopted the Salve Marinera, a hymn to the Virgin Mary as Stella Maris, as its official anthem.

=== The 20th and 21st centuries ===
The first three decades of the 20th century saw a program to rebuild and modernise the Spanish fleet and the country's capacity to build its own warships with British and French help.

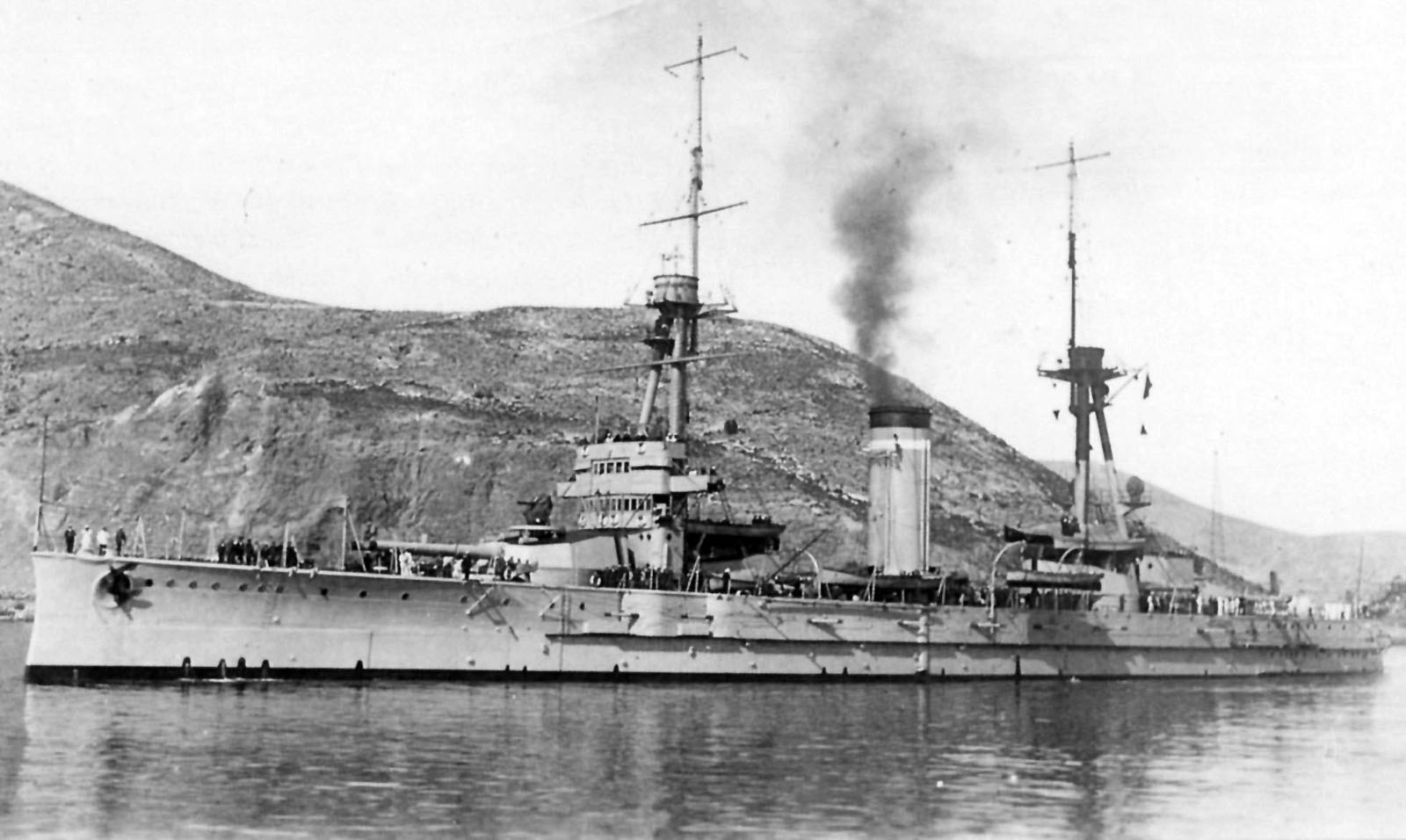
Dreadnought battleship España

During the Rif War in Morocco, the Spanish Navy conducted operations along the coast, including the Alhucemas landing in 1925, the first air-naval landing of the world. At that time, the navy developed a naval aviation branch, the Aeronáutica naval.

==== The Spanish Republic and Spanish Civil War ====
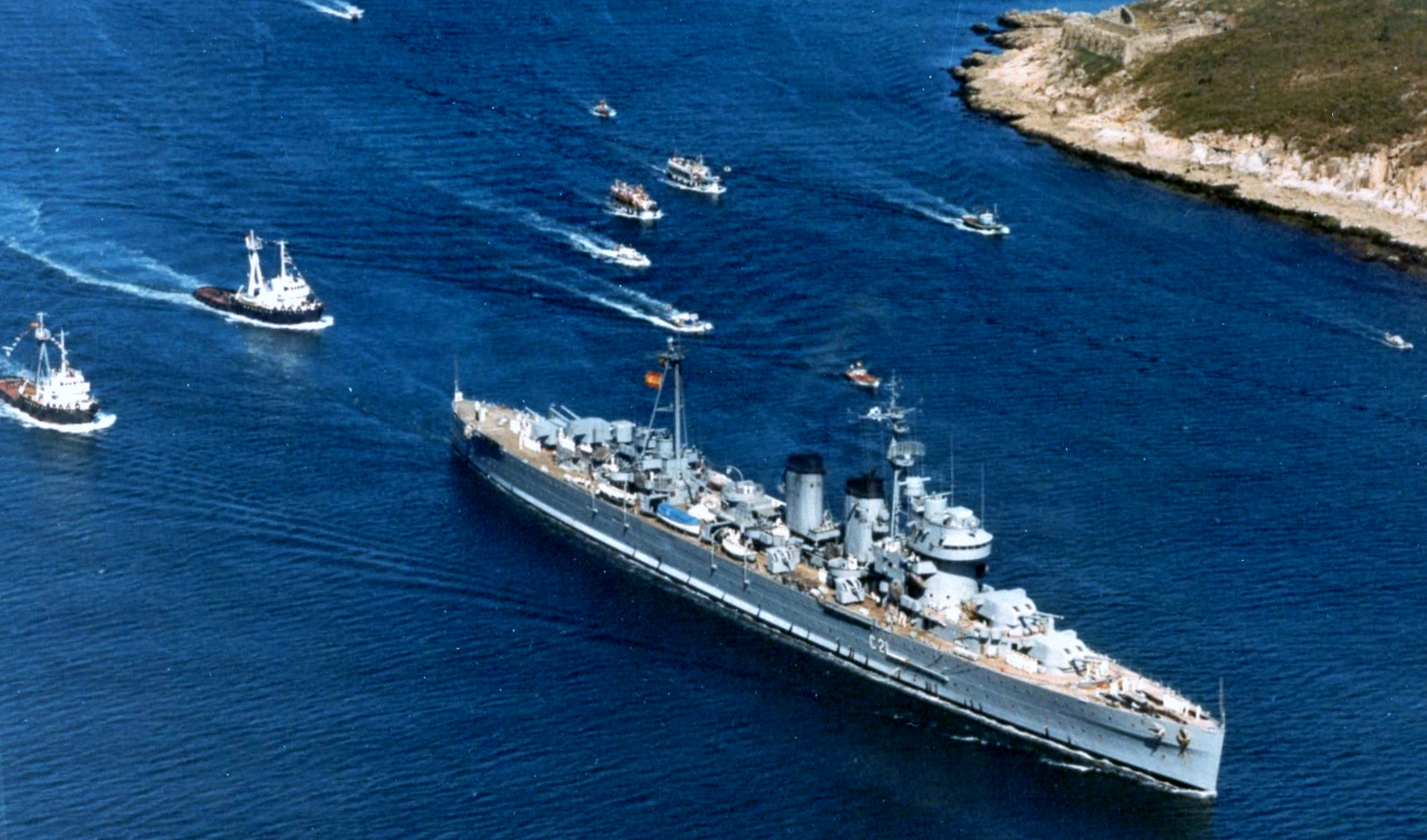
The cruiser Canarias (launched 1928) was the flagship of the Spanish Navy until its discharge in 1975

In 1931, following the proclamation of the Second Spanish Republic, the Navy of the Spanish Kingdom became the Spanish Republican Navy. Admiral Aznar's casual comment: "Do you think it was a little thing what happened yesterday, that Spain went to bed as a monarchy and rose as a republic" became instantly famous, going quickly around Madrid and around Spain, making people accept the fact and setting a more relaxed mood. The Spanish Republican Navy introduced a few changes in the flags and ensigns, as well as in the navy officer rank insignia. The executive curl (La coca) was replaced by a golden five-pointed star and the royal crown of the brass buttons and of the officers' breastplates (La gola) became a mural crown.

The Spanish Republican Navy became divided after the coup of July 1936 that led to the Spanish Civil War (1936–39). The fleet's two small dreadnoughts, one heavy cruiser, one large destroyer and half a dozen submarines and auxiliary vessels were lost in the course of the conflict.

==== World War II ====
Like the rest of the Spanish armed forces, the Spanish Francoist Navy maintained Francisco Franco's policy of neutrality during World War II.

==== Post World War II ====
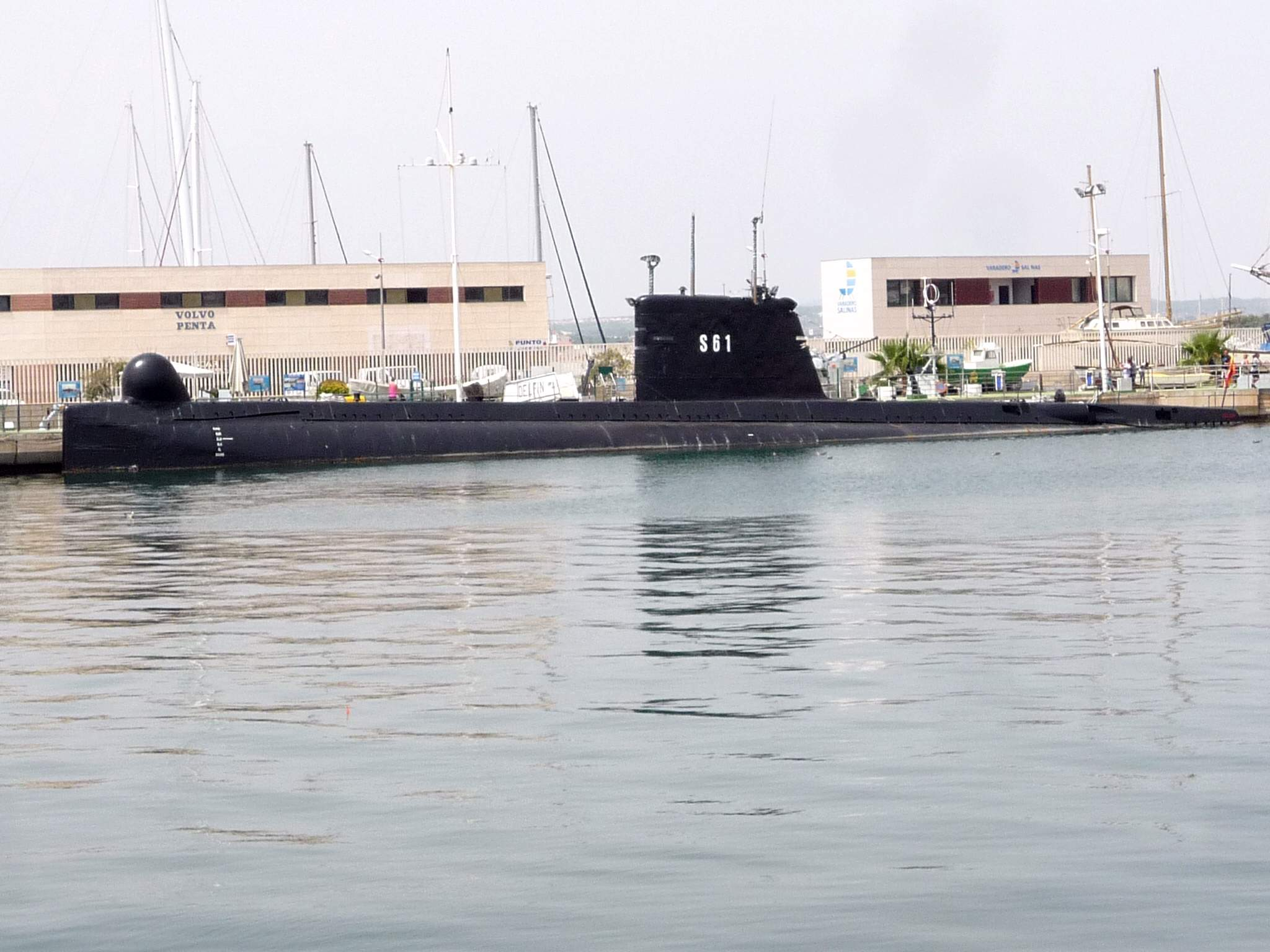
Submarine Delfín, preserved as museum ship in Torrevieja (Alicante), becoming the first "floating museum" of these characteristics in Spain

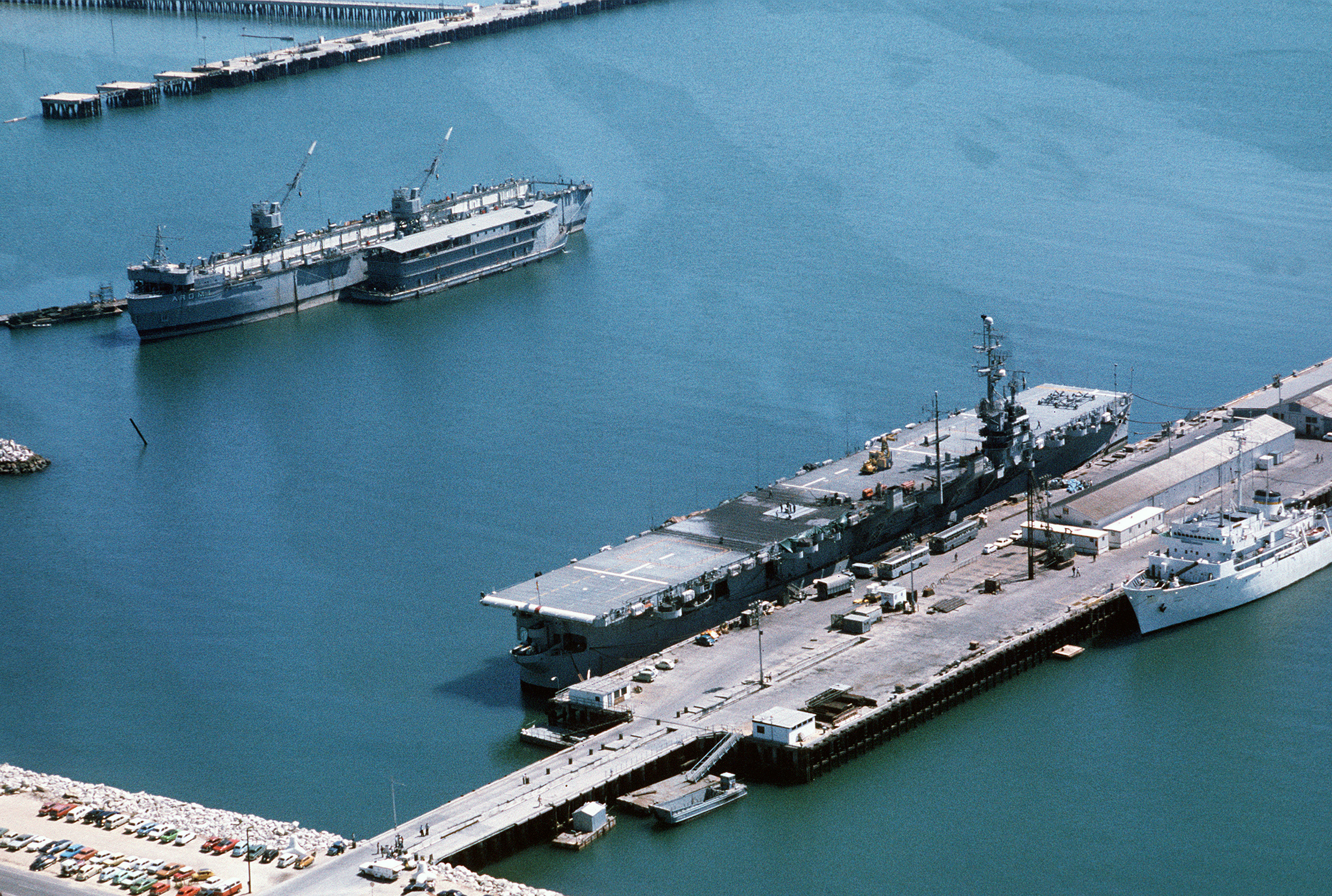
Spanish aircraft carrier Dédalo (ex USS Cabot), flagship between 1975 and 1989, tied up at a pier at Naval Station Rota in 1976

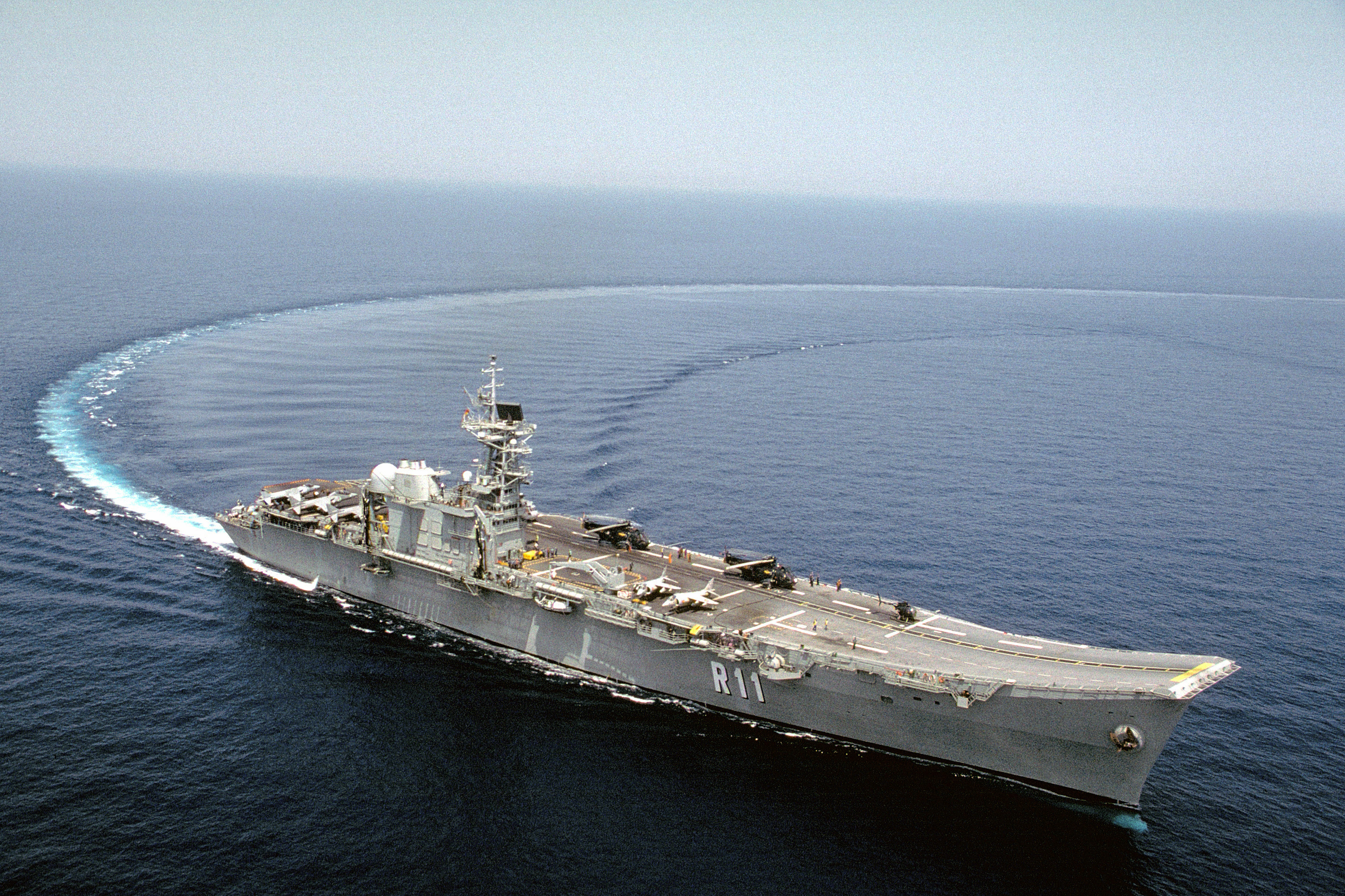
Spanish aircraft carrier Príncipe de Asturias, flagship between 1989 and 2010, during the joint exercise Dragon Hammer '92

Since the mid-20th century, the Spanish Navy began a process of reorganization to once again become one of the major navies of the world. After the development of the Baleares-class frigates based on the US Navy's Knox class, the Spanish Navy embraced the American naval doctrine. Spain became a member of NATO in 1982 and the Armada Española has taken part in many coalition peacekeeping operations, from SFOR to Haiti and other locations around the world. The Armada is a modern navy with an aircraft carrier group, a modern strategic amphibious ship (which replaced a dedicated aircraft carrier in 2011), modern frigates (F-100 class) with the Aegis Combat System, F-80-class frigates, minesweepers, new S-80-class submarines, amphibious ships and various other ships, including oceanographic research ships.

The Armada's special operations and unconventional warfare capability is embodied in the Naval Special Warfare Command (Mando de Guerra Naval Especial), which is under the direct control of the Admiral of the Fleet. The unit in charge of special operations is the Naval Special Warfare Force (Fuerza de Guerra Naval Especial), which is a merge of the previous Special Operations Unit (Unidad de Operaciones Especiales (UOE)) and the Special Combat Diver Unit (Unidad Especial de Buceadores de Combate (UEBC)). This unit is trained in maritime counter-terrorism, specialized combat diving and swimming, coastal infiltration, ship boarding, direct action, special reconnaissance, hydrographic reconnaissance and underwater demolitions.

Armada officers receive their education at the Spanish Naval Academy (ENM). They are recruited through two different methods:

- Militar de Complemento: Similar to the U.S. ROTC program, students are college graduates who enroll in the navy. They spend a year at the Naval Academy and then are commissioned as ensigns and Marine second lieutenants. This path is growing in prestige. Their career stops at the rank of commander (for the Navy) and for the Marines, lieutenant colonel.
- Militar de Carrera: Students spend one year in the Naval Academy if they apply to the Supply Branch or the Engineering Branch, and five years if they apply as General Branch or Marines, receiving a university degree-equivalent upon graduation and being commissioned as ensigns and Marine second lieutenants.

== Status ==
Until February 2013, when it was decommissioned because of budget cuts, the second largest vessel of the Armada was the aircraft carrier Príncipe de Asturias, which entered service in 1988 after completing sea trials. Built in Spain, it was designed with a "ski-jump" takeoff deck. Its complement was 29 AV-8 Harrier II vertical (or short) takeoff and landing (V/STOL) aircraft or 16 helicopters designed for anti-submarine warfare and to support marine landings. As of 2025, it was reported that the AV-8B Harrier II would be unlikely to be replaced given that the acquisition of the F-35B fighter has been ruled out by the Spanish government. If confirmed, this means that carrier-based fighter operations by the Spanish Navy will cease in around 2030.

As of 2012, the Armada had a strength of 20,800 personnel.

=== Infantería de Marina ===
The Infantería de Marina is the marine infantry of the Spanish Navy, and the oldest marine corps in existence in the world. It has a strength of 11,500 troops and is divided into base defense forces and landing forces. One of the three base defense battalions is stationed with each of the Navy headquarters. "Groups" (midway between battalions and regiments) are stationed in Madrid and Las Palmas de Gran Canaria. The Tercio (fleet — regiment equivalent) is available for immediate embarkation and based out of San Fernando. Its principal weapons include light tanks, armored personnel vehicles, self-propelled artillery, and TOW and Dragon anti-tank missiles.

== Equipment ==
=== Ships and submarines ===
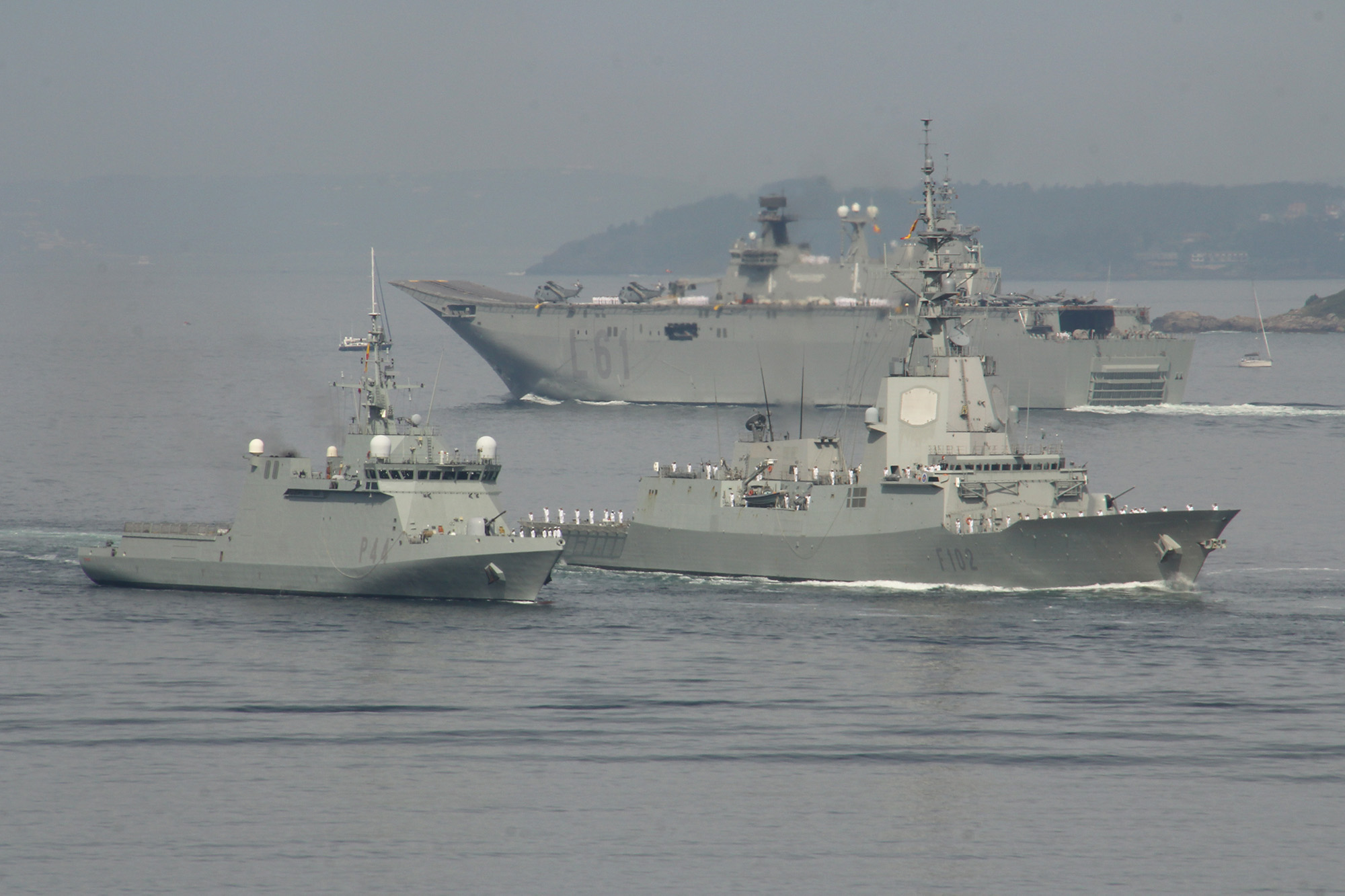
Naval parade of the Spanish Navy held in 2017. In the image, the BAM Tornado (P-44), the frigate Almirante Juan de Borbón (F-102) and in the background, the flagship amphibious assault ship Juan Carlos I (L-61).

As of 2018, there are approximately 138 vessels in service within the navy, including minor auxiliary vessels. A breakdown includes an amphibious assault ship (also used as an aircraft carrier), amphibious transport docks, frigates, submarines, mine countermeasure vessels, patrol vessels and a number of auxiliary ships. The total displacement of the Spanish Navy is approximately 220,000 tonnes.

=== Aircraft ===
The Spanish Naval Air Arm constitutes the naval aviation branch of the Spanish Navy.

Aircraft	Spanish designation	Image	Origin	Type	Variant	In service	Notes
Combat aircraft
McDonnell Douglas AV-8B Harrier II	—		United Kingdom; United States	Multirole	EAV-8B Matador II+	12	1 crashed in 2024
McDonnell Douglas AV-8B Harrier II	—		United Kingdom; United States	Conversion trainer	TAV-8B	1	Provides conversion training
Transport / Utility aircraft
Cessna Citation	C 550		United States	Utility aircraft	Cessna Citation II/III	3	
Pilatus PC-24	—		Switzerland	Trainer / Utility aircraft	—	0 (+3 on order)	Successor of the Cessna Citation C550.
Helicopters
NHI NH90	—		France; Germany; Italy; Netherlands; Spain	Transport	NH90 MSPT	4 (+9 on order)	Orders: 7 in 2022; 6 in 2025
Sikorsky SH-60 Seahawk	—		United States	ASW	SH-60B	10	
Sikorsky SH-60 Seahawk	—		United States	Transport	SH-60F	8	
Sikorsky SH-60 Seahawk	—		United States	ASW / ASuW / Transport	MH-60R	0 (+8 on order)	8 on order, to replace SH-60B
Trainer aircraft
Airbus H135	—		Germany	Rotorcraft trainer	H135 P3H NIVAL	7 (+1 on order)	Orders: 7 in 2023; 1 in 2025
UAV
Boeing Insitu MQ-27 ScanEagle	—		United States	Unmanned surveillance and reconnaissance aerial vehicle	—	8	

== Ranks and insignia ==
The officer ranks of the Spanish Navy are as follows below, (for a comparison with other NATO ranks, see Ranks and Insignia of NATO). Midshipmen are further divided into 1st and 2nd Classes and Officer Cadets 3rd and 4th Classes respectively.

Officers

NATO code	OF-10	OF-9	OF-8	OF-7	OF-6	OF-5	OF-4	OF-3	OF-2	OF-1
Spanish Navy
Spanish Navy	Capitán general	Almirante general	Almirante	Vicealmirante	Contralmirante	Capitán de navío	Capitán de fragata	Capitán de corbeta	Teniente de navío	Alférez de navío	Alférez de fragata

Enlisted

NATO code	OR-9		OR-8	OR-7	OR-6	OR-5	OR-4	OR-3	OR-2	OR-1
Spanish Navy
Spanish Navy	Suboficial mayor	Subteniente	Brigada	Sargento primero	Sargento	Cabo mayor	Cabo primero	Cabo	Marinero de primera	Marinero

The article Spanish Marine Infantry includes the rank insignia descriptions for this part of the Navy.

== Organization ==
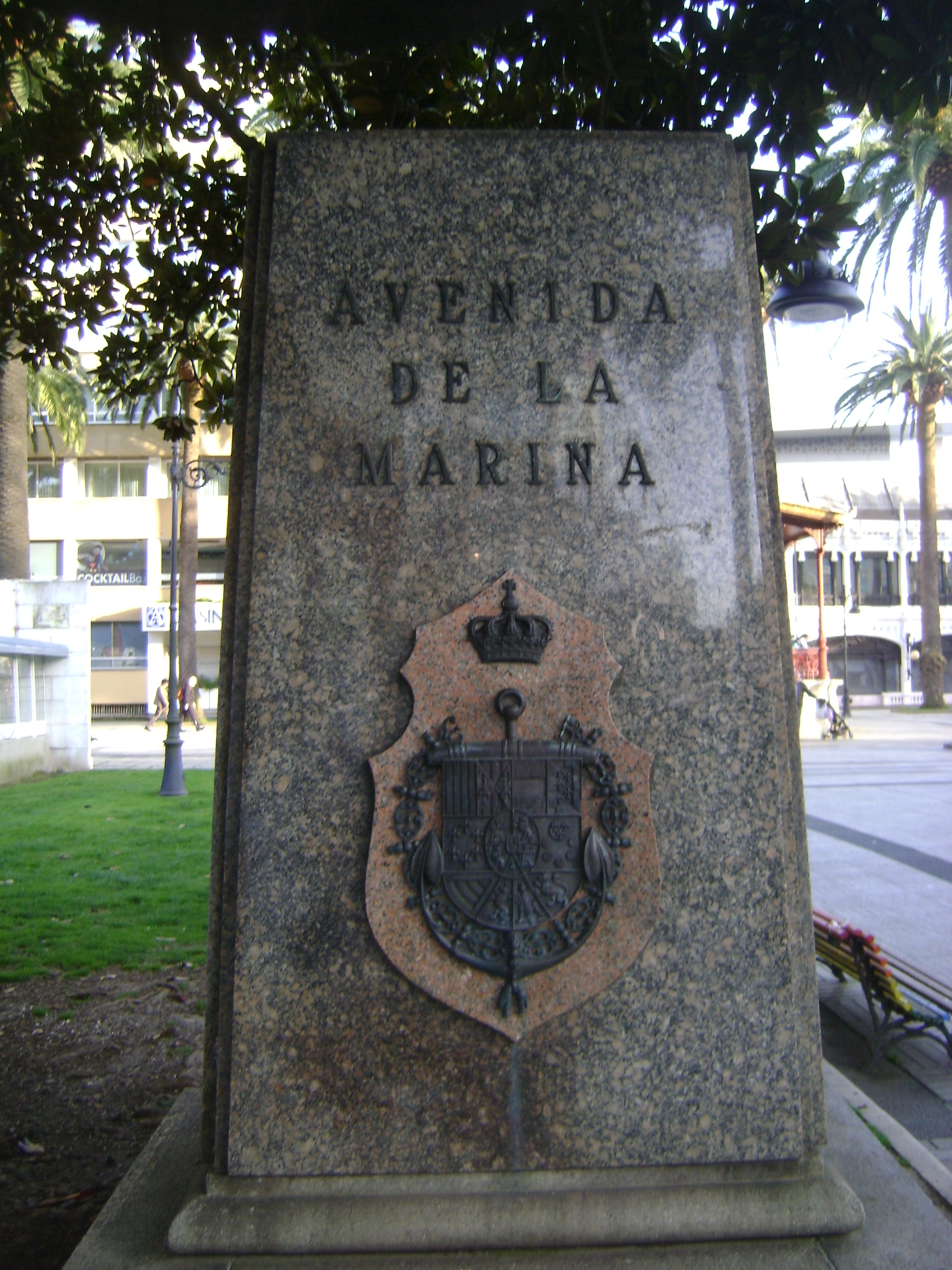
Monolit of Spanish Navy in La Coruña.

The Spanish Navy shares the organization model of its two sister services – the Spanish Army and the Spanish Air and Space Force. Each of them consists of a Headquarters (Cuartel general), a Force (Fuerza, composed of the operational units) and a Force Support (Apoyo a la fuerza, composed of administration, logistical and training units). For historical traditions the Force of the Spanish Navy is called Fleet (Flota) and the two terms are used interchangeably. At the head of the Navy is an Almirante general (a four-star rank reserved for the Chief of the Spanish Navy and the Chief of the Spanish Armed Forces, when the latter position is held by a naval officer), denominated AJEMA or Admiral Chief of the General Staff of the Navy (Almirante Jefe de Estado Mayor de la Armada). Counterintuitive to this official designation he holds authority over all three components of the service and the officer, who actually functions as Chief of Staff is a three-star Almirante, designated Admiral Deputy Chief of the General Staff of the Navy (Almirante Segundo Jefe del Estado Mayor de la Armada or 2º AJEMA).

Admiral Chief of the General Staff of the Navy (AJEMA)

The basic structure of the Spanish Navy, as defined by Instruction DEF/707/2020 of the Chief of the Naval Staff, is as follows:

- Naval Headquarters

The Spanish Navy Headquarters, located in Madrid, comprises a series of departments with the necessary personnel and material to advise the Chief of Staff of the Spanish Navy in the execution of his duties. The CGA is made up of the following bodies:

  - Naval Staff (EMA)
  - Chief of Staff's Private Office
  - Support Elements to Organic Action (AOOA)
  - Head Office of General Services and Technical Assistance (JESAT)
  - History and Naval Culture Institute (IHCN)
  - Legal Advice Department
  - Naval Central Court
- The Force

The Force of the Spanish Navy is the Fleet, under direct command of AJEMA. Its main task is to have ready the operational naval structures capable of deploying in different types of operations, either joint, combined or specific. It is also in charge of securing the necessary logistic support to those operations. The Fleet is organized into the following bodies:

  - Fleet
    - Fleet Headquarters
    - Headquarters of the Spanish Maritime Forces
    - Surface Combat Force (FUCOM)
      - Amphibious & Projection Group (Rota):
        - 1 LHD L60 LHD Juan Carlos I (L61). 27,079 tons.
        - 2 LPD L50 LPD Galicia-class landing platform docks. 13,818 tons
      - 31st Surface Squadron. (Ferrol)
        - 5 AEGIS Frigates F100 Álvaro de Bazán class. 6,250 tons.
        - 1 Replenishment ship A-14 Patiño. 17,045 tons
        - 1 Replenishment ship A-15 Cantabria. 19,500 tons
      - 41st Escort Squadron (Rota)
        - 6 Frigates F80 Santa María class. 4,017 tons
      - Mine Countermeasures Force (Cartagena)
        - 6 Minehunters M30 Segura class. 585 tons
    - Submarine Flotilla (FLOSUB) (Cartagena)
        - 1 Submarine S70 Agosta class. 1,740 tons
        - 1 AIP submarines S80 Isaac Peral class. (3 more under construction) 3,426 tons
    - Aircraft Flotilla (FLOAN) (Rota)
      - 4th Flying Squadron – 4 Cessna Citation liaison aircraft (3 C550 + 1 C650)
      - 5th Flying Squadron – 8 SH-60F Seahawk
      - 9th Flying Squadron – 11 McDonnell Douglas AV/TAV-8B+ Harrier II (10AV + 1 TAV)
      - 10th Flying Squadron – 12 Sikorsky SH-60B Seahawk (To be replaced by MH-60R "Romeo")
      - 11th Flying Squadron – 8 Boeing Insitu ScanEagle
      - 12th Flying Squadron – 7 Airbus H-135 P3H
      - 14th Flying Squadron – 2 NHIndustries NH90 (5 more on order)
      - Carrier Air Group – aircraft detached from the flying squadrons
    - Marine Infantry Force – Commandant General of Naval Infantry (COMGEIM) (San Fernando, Cádiz)
    - Maritime Action Force (FAM)
      - Headquarters of the Maritime Action Force.
      - Canary Islands Naval Command.
        - Canary Islands Maritime Action Command
      - Balearic Islands Naval Sector
      - Ferrol Maritime Action Command
      - Cádiz Maritime Action Command
      - Cartagena Maritime Action Command
      - Training ship 'Juan Sebastián de Elcano'
      - Spanish Navy Diving Center
      - Hydrographic Institute
      - Naval stations of Algeciras, Alicante, Almería, Barcelona, Bilbao, Cádiz, Cartagena, Ceuta, Ferrol, Corunna, Gijón, Huelva, Las Palmas, Mahon, Málaga, Melilla, Miño, Majorca, Tenerife, Santander, San Sebastian, Seville, Tarragona, Valencia, and Vigo.
    - Combat Assessment and Certification Center (CEVACO)
    - Fleet Doctrine Center (CEFLOT)
- Force Support
  - Personnel Head Office
  - Logistic Support Head Office
  - Financial Affairs Head Office

== See also ==
- Salve Marinera
- Coats of arms, badges and emblems of Spanish Armed Forces#Navy
- List of active Spanish Navy ships
- List of historic Spanish Navy ships
- List of future Spanish Navy ships
