= Battle of La Rochelle (1419) =

Part of the Hundred Years' War

Coordinates: 47.2667°N 1.3833°W

- Part of the Hundred Years' War
Date	December 30, 1419
Location	Coast and Port of La Rochelle
Result	Castilian victory

Belligerents
Crown of Castile	County of Flanders; Hanseatic League

Commanders and leaders
John II of Castile	Unknown

Casualties and losses
Unknown	40 ships captured

The naval Battle of La Rochelle of 1419 took place between a Castilian and an allied Flemish-Hanseatic fleet. The Castilian victory resulted in their naval supremacy in the Bay of Biscay. but it also led to a protracted conflict with Flanders and the Hanseatic League, which ended in 1443 with further commercial concessions to Castile. The battle was notable for the use of guns by the Castilian fleet.
