= Exercise Orion =

Exercise Orion may refer to:

- A French Armed Forces exercise held every three years
- A Portuguese Armed Forces exercise held annually with Spain and the United States
- A Fire services in the United Kingdom disaster training exercise held in 2010
