= European Patrol Corvette =

Planned class of European corvettes

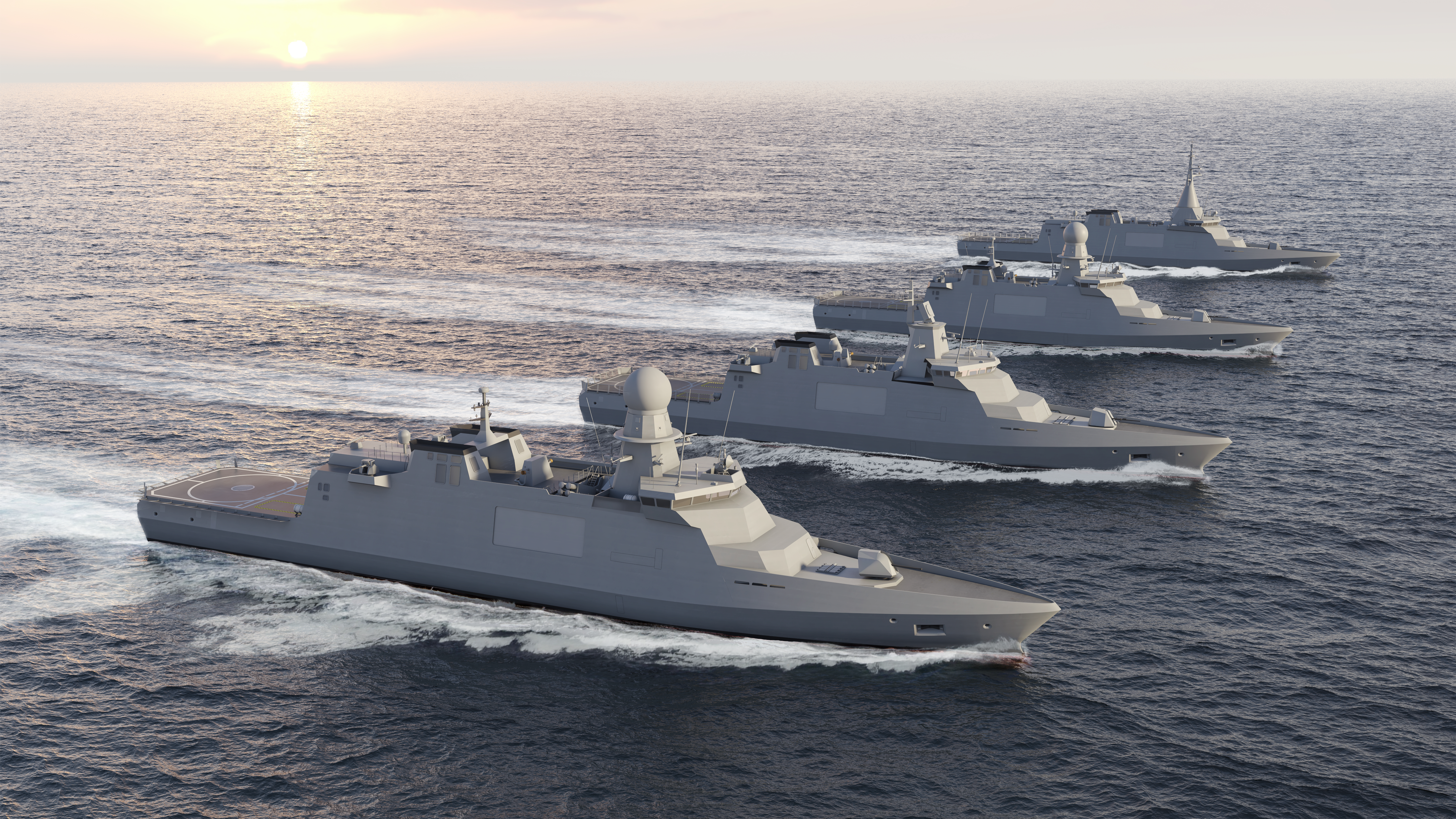
- Artist's rendering of EPC variants sailing (by Naviris)

Class overview
- Cost: Concept & Design Phase (Call 1) - 2021: €87 million with a max. EU contribution of €60 million; Design certification & Prototype testing (Call 2) - 2023: €288.3 million with a max. EU contribution of €154.5 million
- In commission: Projected from 2030

General characteristics
- Type: Corvette
- Displacement: <3,000 t
- Length: <110 m (360 ft 11 in)
- Draft: <5.5 m (18 ft 1 in)
- Propulsion: CODLAD, CODAD
- Speed: 24 knots (44 km/h; 28 mph) or 26 knots (48 km/h; 30 mph)
- Armament: Varied depending on nation and role
- Aircraft carried: NH90-sized helicopter and/or UAVs

The Multi Modular Patrol Corvette (MMPC), previously named European Patrol Corvette (EPC), is a Permanent Structured Cooperation (PESCO) project that was adopted by the European Council on 12 November 2019. The objective is to design and develop a new class of surface combatants. The project originally involved Italy and France, the former being the coordinator. The two countries would soon be joined by Greece as well as Spain, and gradually, by several other European countries such as Denmark, Norway and Romania.

In 2022, it was indicated that the project would receive a further €200 million from the EU's European Defence fund (EDF).

== Design and description ==
The ships will have a conventional hull of different dimensions, armament and propulsion systems.

While early thinking had suggested that up to three variants of the ship were to be considered, the concept subsequently evolved into two versions:

- Combat variant (FCM, reported Italian preference): 3D radar and combat management systems, short to medium range surface-to-air missiles (SAM), anti-torpedo countermeasures, envisaged top speed: 25–26 knots (46–48 km/h; 29–30 mph);
- Long-range patrol variant (LRM, reported French preference): 3D radar and combat management systems, short to medium range SAMs, envisaged top speed: 24 knots (44 km/h; 28 mph)

A 2024 report noted that the main differences between the LRM and FCM versions would encompass the propulsion, sensors, and weaponry configurations. The FCM variant was to include additional anti-ship missiles and countermeasures against torpedoes and drones. Both variants would have the capacity to accommodate helicopters. Key to the design was a modular concept in order to "increase standardisation across European navies, allowing interoperability and adaptability in joint missions and enhancing EU military autonomy in economic, technological, and security domains". In November 2024, Navantia (Spain), Fincantieri (Italy), and Naval Group (France) signed a consortium agreement for the second phase of the project. The consortium is expected to be joined by the Greek engineering company HYDRUS.

The participating member states aim to potentially sign a contract as early as 2025 and expect the keel laying of the first ship to take place in 2026 and delivery to start in 2030.

== Participants ==
States:

- Italy - Project coordinator
- France
- Spain
- Greece
- Denmark
- Norway
- Romania
- Portugal - Observer
- Croatia - Observer
- Ireland - Observer

Main companies:

- (Italy) (France) Naviris (a 50/50 joint venture between Fincantieri and Naval Group)
- (Italy) Fincantieri
- (France) Naval Group
- (Spain) Navantia
- (Greece) Hydrus

== Expected users ==
- Italian Navy
  - To succeed the Comandanti-class patrol vessel
- French Navy
  - To succeed the Floréal-class surveillance frigates
- Spanish Navy
  - To succeed the Descubierta-class corvettes and Serviola-class patrol boats
- Romanian Naval Forces
  - To succeed the Tetal-I and Tetal-II corvettes
- Hellenic Navy

== See also ==
- Common Security and Defence Policy
  - Permanent Structured Cooperation
    - European Main Battle Tank
    - Integrated Unmanned Ground System
    - European MALE RPAS
    - Eurocopter Tiger
  - European External Action Service
