= French tanker Meuse =

French Navy command and replenishment ship

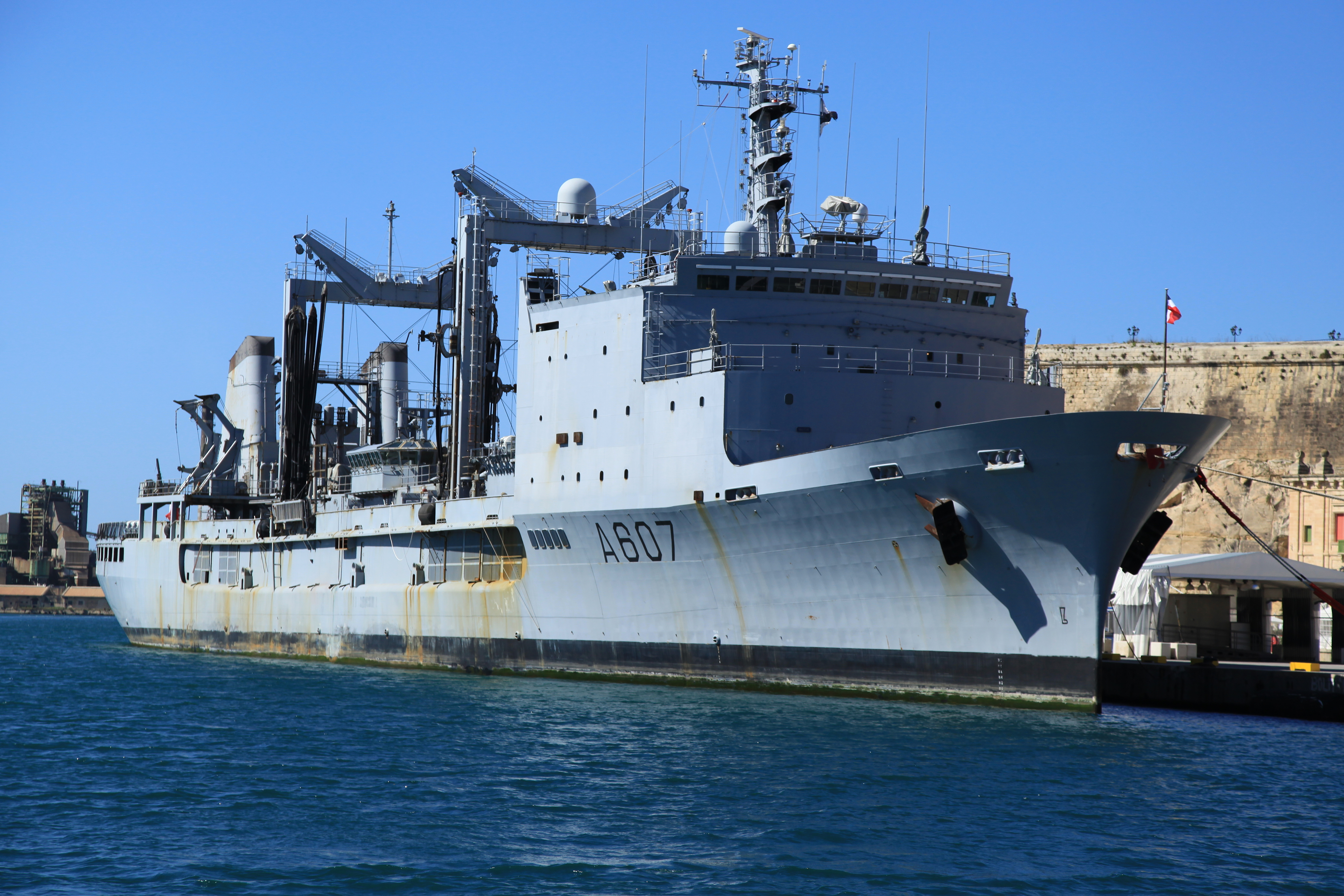
- Meuse at Malta on 9 March 2013

History

France
- Name: Meuse
- Namesake: Meuse
- Builder: Brest Arsenal, Brest
- Laid down: 2 June 1977
- Launched: 2 December 1978
- Commissioned: 21 November 1980
- Decommissioned: 16 December 2015
- Home port: Toulon
- Identification: MMSI number: 228780000; Callsign: FCMU; Pennant number: A 607
- Status: Decommissioned

General characteristics
- Type: Durance-class tanker
- Displacement: 7,700 t (7,600 long tons) standard; 18,100 t (17,800 long tons) (full load)
- Length: 157.2 m (515 ft 9 in)
- Beam: 21.2 m (69 ft 7 in)
- Draught: 8.65 m (28 ft 5 in) standard; 10.8 m (35 ft 5 in) full load
- Propulsion: 2 × SEMT Pielstick 16 PC2.5 V 400 diesel engines; 2 shafts, 15,000 kW (20,000 hp)
- Speed: 20 knots (37 km/h; 23 mph)
- Range: 9,000 nmi (17,000 km; 10,000 mi) at 15 knots (28 km/h; 17 mph)
- Complement: 162
- Sensors & processing systems: 2 × DRBN 34 radars
- Armament: 1 × Bofors 40 mm (1.6 in)/L60 gun; 4 × 12.7 mm (0.5 in) M2 Browning machine guns; 3 × Simbad Mistral missile launcher
- Aviation facilities: Helicopter deck

Meuse is a Durance-class replenishment oiler (French: Pétrolier Ravitailleur d'Escadre, PCE) of the French Navy. Constructed by the Brest Arsenal in Brest, France, the vessel was launched on 2 December 1978 and entered service in 1980. The tanker served on several overseas operations, often operating with France's aircraft carriers in a support role. Meuse was taken out of service on 16 December 2015.

== Development and design ==
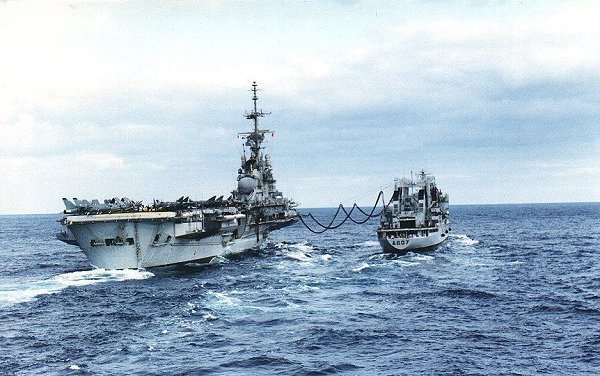
Meuse refueling the aircraft carrier Foch in 1999

In French service, the first two Durance-class tankers were called Pétrolier Ravitailleur d'Escadre (PRE, "fleet replenishment oiler"). The first two ships were built to a similar design with different capabilities of the following three. Meuse, the second vessel of the class, had a superstructure that was one deck higher than Durance, the lead ship of the class. The first two ships carry two cranes abaft the bridge.

Meuse has a standard displacement of 7,700 tonnes (7,600 long tons) and 18,100 t (17,800 long tons) at full load. The oiler is 157.3 metres (516 ft 1 in) long overall and 149 m (488 ft 10 in) between perpendiculars with a beam of 21.2 m (69 ft 7 in) and a draught of 8.65 m (28 ft 5 in) empty and 10.8 m (35 ft 5 in) at full load. Meuse is powered by two SEMT Pielstick 16 PC2.5 V 400 diesel engines turning two LIPS controllable pitch propellers rated at 15,000 kilowatts (20,000 hp). The vessel has a maximum speed of 20 knots (37 km/h; 23 mph), a maximum sustained speed of 19 knots (35 km/h; 22 mph) and a range of 9,000 nautical miles (17,000 km; 10,000 mi) at 15 knots (28 km/h; 17 mph).

They have two dual solid/liquid underway transfer stations per side and can replenish two ships per side and one astern. Of those four stations, two of them are SYTAR (French: Systéme de Tensionnement Automatique pour Ravitaillement en Mer) stations. The ship initially had capacity for 5,170 t (5,090 long tons) of fuel oil, 4,078 t (4,014 long tons) of diesel fuel, 1,160 t (1,140 long tons) of JP-5 aviation fuel, 250 t (250 long tons) of distilled water, 180 t (180 long tons) of provisions, 150 t (150 long tons) of munitions and 15 t (15 long tons) of spare parts. These numbers change with the needs of the fleet.

The Durance-class tankers all mount a flight deck over the stern and a hangar. The ships utilise Aérospatiale Alouette III and Westland Lynx helicopters but are capable of operating larger ones from their flight deck. For defence, Meuse initially mounted one Bofors 40 mm/L60 anti-aircraft (AA) gun in a single gun turret and two single-mounted 20 mm (0.8 in)/70 calibre Mk. 10 Mod 23 AA guns. (Note: The 70 calibre denotes the length of the gun. This means that the length of the gun barrel is 70 times the bore diameter. L60 also means this.) The ship is equipped with two DRBN 34 navigational radars, a Telegon HF/DF system, Thales DR-2000 intercept radar and an SLQ-25 Nixie towed torpedo decoy system. The armament was later altered by removing the 20 mm guns and adding four 12.7 mm (0.5 in) M2 Browning machine guns and three launchers for Simbad Mistral surface-to-air missiles. The ship has a complement of 163 and is capable of accommodating 45 personnel.

== Construction and career ==
The second tanker of the Durance class was laid down on 2 June 1977 at the Brest Arsenal in Brest, France. She was launched on 2 December 1978 and given the pennant number A 607. Meuse was commissioned into the French Navy on 8 August 1980 or 21 November 1980. The Durance-class ships were assigned to the Force d'action navale (FAR, "Naval Action Force") after entering service and based at Toulon.

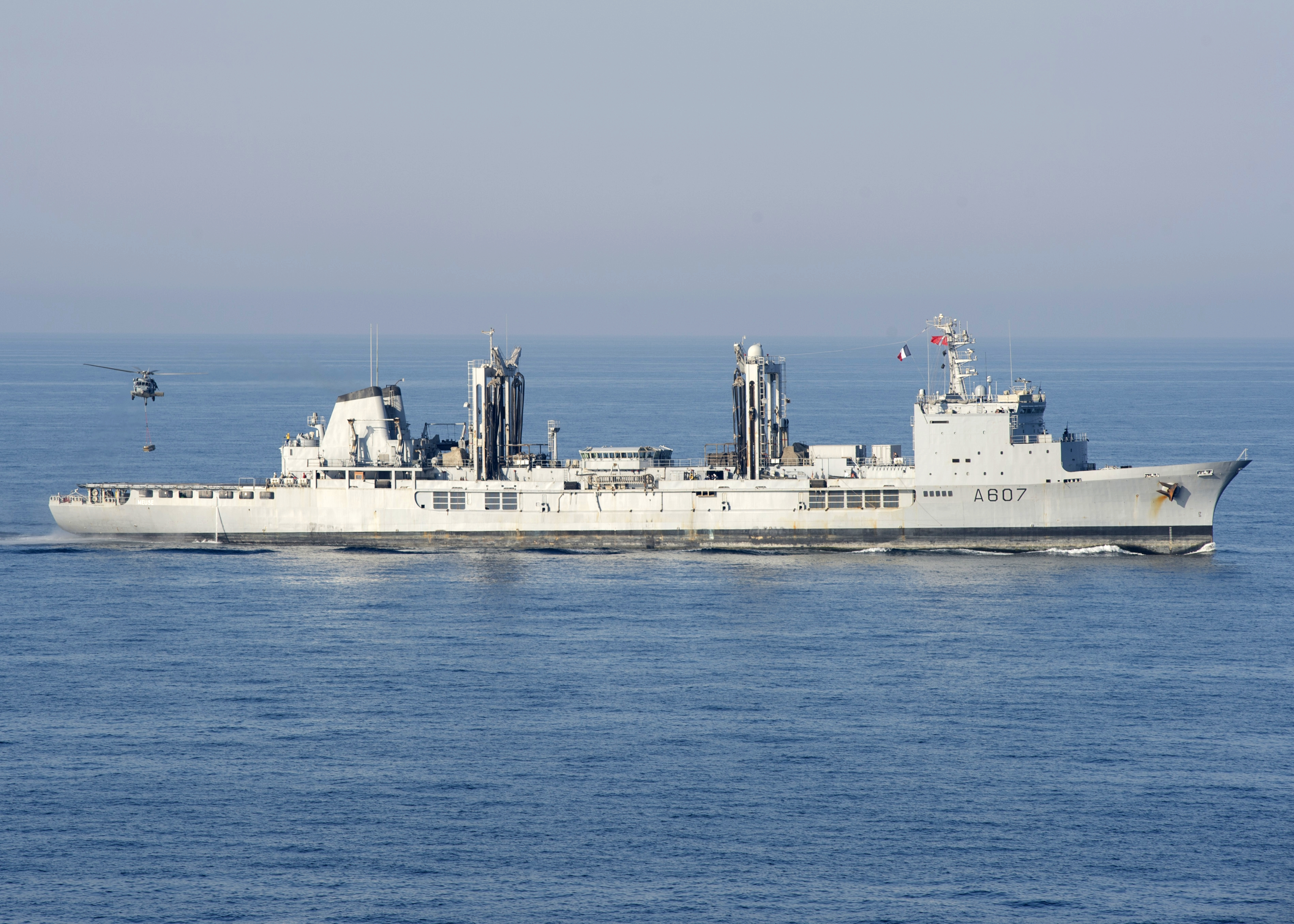
Meuse in the Arabian Sea on 2 March 2015

Meuse participated in Opération Olifant in 1983–1984 off Lebanon with the aircraft carriers Foch and Clemenceau. She was deployed in Opération Daguet, the French contribution to the Gulf War in 1991. She participated in Opération Trident in 1999 with Foch supporting Kosovo. Meuse took part in Mission Héraclès in 2001 with the aircraft carrier Charles de Gaulle as part of the War in Afghanistan. As part of Opération Agapanthe the tanker operated off India in 2010–2011 with Charles de Gaulle and again with the aircraft carrier in Opération Harmattan in 2011. Meuse was assigned to Opération Chammal in January 2015 with Charles de Gaulle. She was decommissioned on 16 December 2015.
