= Mission Héraclès =

2001 French Navy operation in the War in Afghanistan

Mission Héraclès was a 2001 operation of the French Navy, in support of the War in Afghanistan against the Taliban. Its main tasks included the provision of security and order around Kabul as well as the training of the newly created Afghan Army.

The French military actions in support of the Operation Enduring Freedom began as early as October 2001 when a group of liaison officers were sent to the United States Central Command (CENTCOM) in Florida to coordinate strategy against the Taliban. On 21 November 2001, France decided to send the aircraft carrier Charles de Gaulle to the Indian Ocean in support of Operation Enduring Freedom against Taliban-controlled Afghanistan. The vessel is the only non-US nuclear-powered aircraft carrier. Task Force 473, with 2,900 men under the command of Contre-Amiral François Cluzel, sailed on 1 December. The task force was composed of Charles de Gaulle, frigates La Motte-Picquet, Jean de Vienne and Jean Bart, the nuclear attack submarine Rubis, the tanker Meuse and the D'Estienne d'Orves-class aviso Commandant Ducuing. The electronic surveillance vessel Bougainville was also part of the task force.

Embarked air power comprised sixteen Super Étendards, one E-2C Hawkeye, two Rafale Ms and several helicopters. The Super Étendards carried out their first missions above Afghanistan on 19 December, executing reconnaissance and bombing missions, covering over 3,000 kilometres (1,900 mi). Overall they carried out 140 missions, averaging 12 every day.

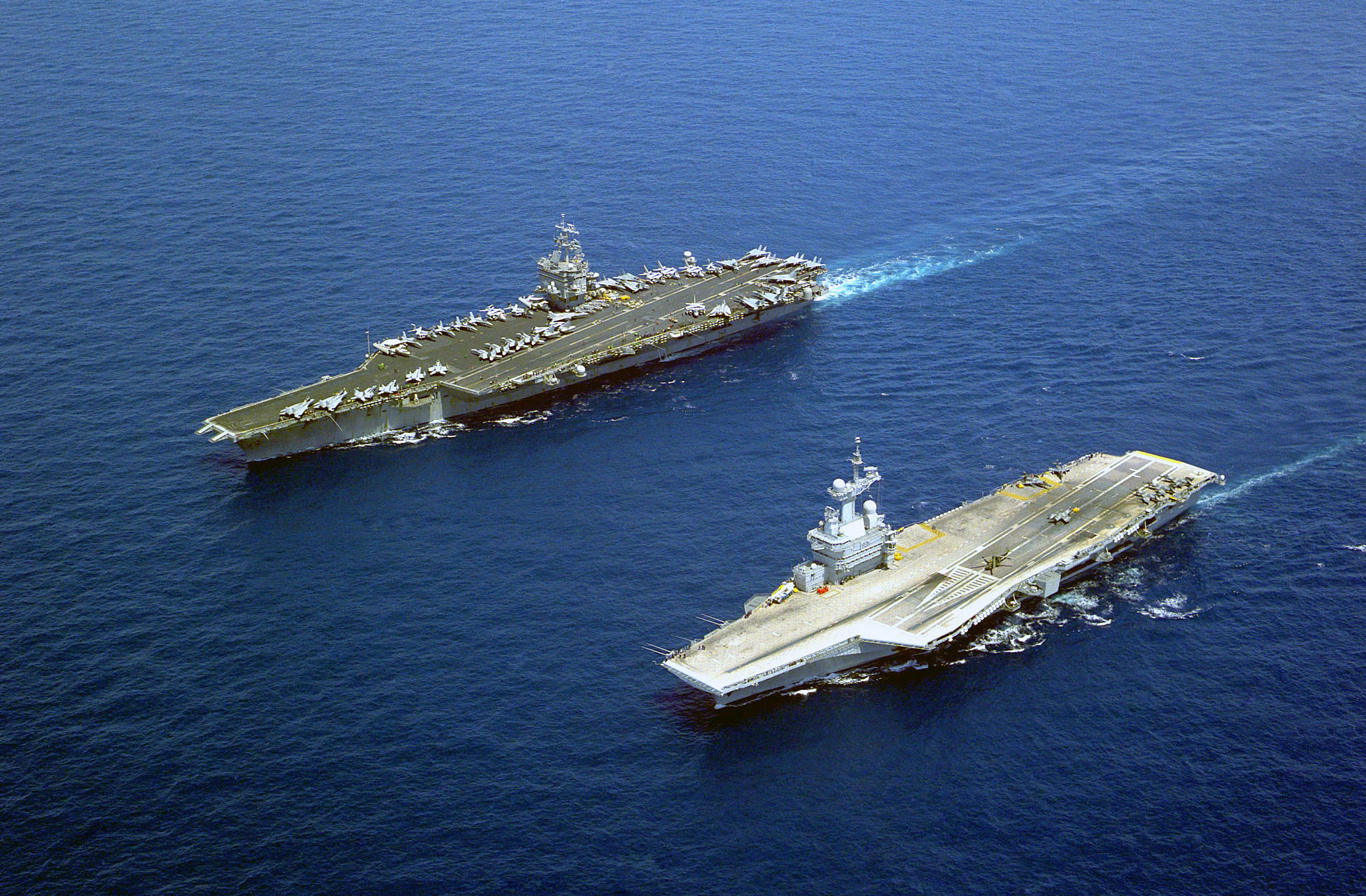
USS Enterprise (left), the first nuclear-powered aircraft carrier, and Charles de Gaulle (right), at the time the latest nuclear carrier.

On 18 February 2002, a Helios observation satellite spotted abnormal activities near Gardez. The next day, after American Special Forces in the region confirmed these observations, Charles de Gaulle launched two reconnaissance Super Étendards. On 20 February, coalition forces entered the valley and Operation Anaconda began in early March.

In March, Super Étendards and six Mirage 2000 aircraft carried out airstrikes against targets claimed to be al Qaeda. A few targets suggested by US forces were denied out of fear of hitting civilians. Nevertheless, French involvement was complimented on 11 March 2002 by US President George W. Bush, who mentioned "our good ally, France, has deployed nearly one-fourth of its navy to support Operation Enduring Freedom". At this point, the French air complement had been increased to 16 Super Étendards, 6 Mirage 2000 D, 5 Rafales, and two Hawkeye AWACS. From February, the air wings of Charles de Gaulle and USS John C. Stennis landed on each other's decks as a means of strengthening the ties between the allies.

On 2 May, Charles de Gaulle arrived in Singapore for relief and returned to Oman on 18 May.
