= Vulcano-class logistic support ship =

Italian class of replenishment tankers

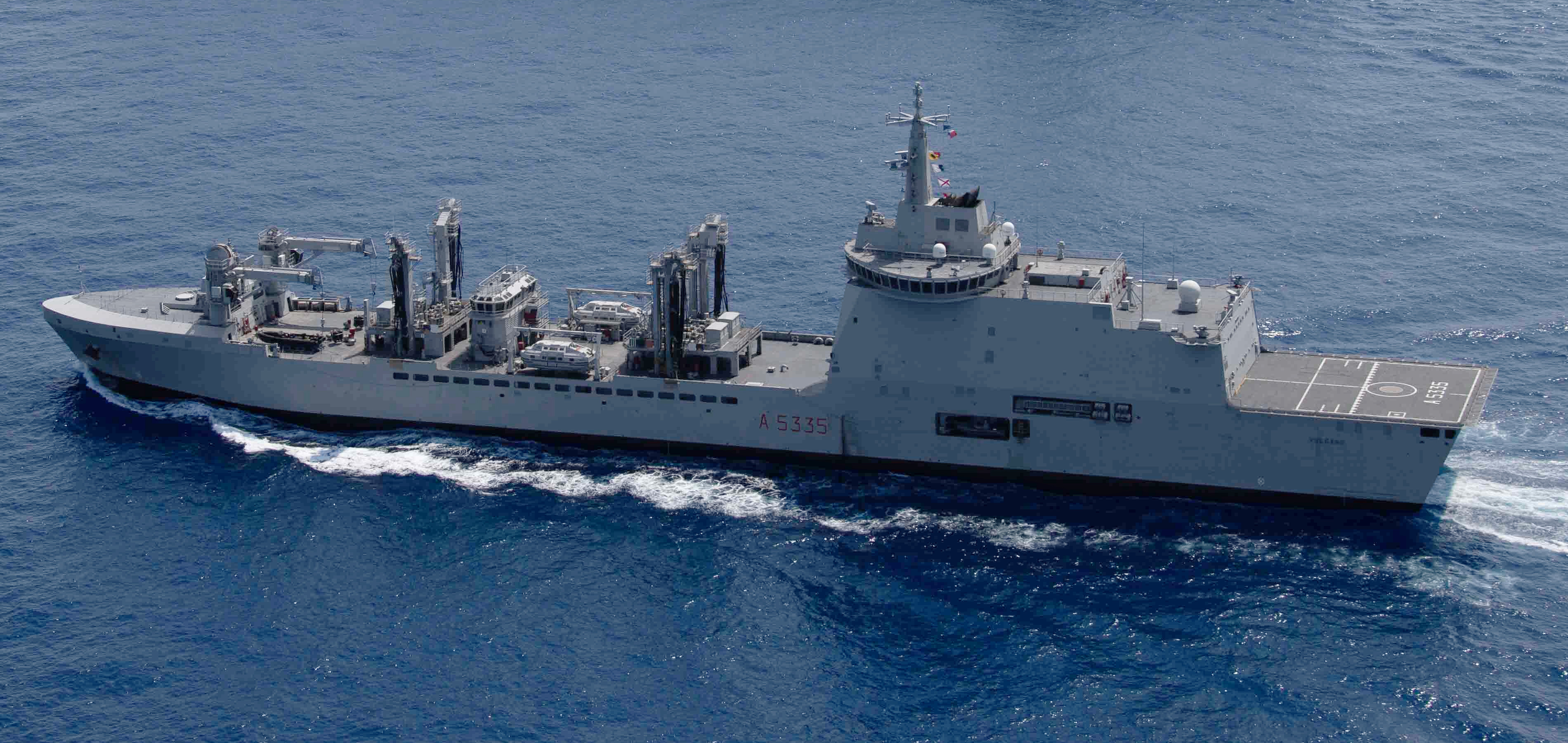
- Vulcano in June 2023 in the Adriatic

Class overview
- Name: Vulcano class
- Builders: Fincantieri
- Operators: Italian Navy; French Navy
- Preceded by: Stromboli class
- Subclasses: Bâtiment ravitailleur de forces
- Cost: €374.6 million (2019) for the first unit
- Built: 2016–present
- In commission: 2021–present
- Planned: 4× Italian Navy; 4× French Navy
- Building: 1× French Navy
- Completed: 2× Italian Navy (Vulcano & Atlante); 2× French Navy (Jacques Chevallier & Jacques Stosskopf)
- Active: 4 (2x French Navy; 2x Italian Navy)

General characteristics
- Type: Logistic support ship
- Displacement: 27,200 t (26,800 long tons) full load
- Length: 193 m (633 ft 2 in) LOA; 175.9 m (577 ft 1 in) LPP
- Beam: 27.2 m (89 ft 3 in)
- Height: 16.3 m (53 ft 6 in)
- Draft: 8.4 m (27 ft 7 in)
- Propulsion: CODLAD scheme which drive two propellers; 2 × MAN 20V32/44CR diesel engines, 24,000 kW (32,000 bhp); 2 × electric engines Marelli Motori 1.5 MW (2,000 bhp) each; 4 × MAN 6L27/38 diesel generators, 8,336 kW (11,179 bhp); 1 × emergency diesel generator, 855 kW (1,147 bhp); 2 × electric engines on Marelli Motori shafts 1.65 MW (2,210 bhp) each; 4 × diesel generators for SCR (Selective Catalytic Reduction); 2 × thrusters, 1.0 MW (1,300 bhp) each; 2 shafts
- Speed: 20 knots (37 km/h; 23 mph); 10 knots (19 km/h; 12 mph) on electric engines
- Range: 7,000 nmi (13,000 km; 8,100 mi) at 16 knots (30 km/h; 18 mph)
- Endurance: 30 days
- Complement: 188 (+5) + 42 transported + 13 hospitalised
- Crew: 167
- Sensors & processing systems: 1 × GEM Elettronica Columbus/N 3D radar; 1 × Leonardo IFF; 2 × GEM Elettronica MM/SPN-760, navigation dual-band radars, X/Ku; 1 × GEM Elettronica helicopter landing radar; Leonardo Link 11-16-22JREAP; 2 × Leonardo Janus-N IRST system; Leonardo obstacle avoidance sonar; FFBNW Torpedo Detection Sonar; CMS, Command Management System Leonardo SADOC Mk4, with 8 consoles (PPA and LHD Trieste simplified version); SMS, Ship Management System "SeasNavy" of Seastema (Fincantieri), with other 8 consoles, integrated with CMS SADOC Mk4
- Electronic warfare & decoys: FFBNW CESM; FFBNW RESM
- Armament: 2 × Oto Melara - Oerlikon KBA 25 mm/80, remotized; - 2 × LRAS (Long Range Acoustic System) SITEP MS-424; - FFBNW 1 × Oto Melara 76 mm/62 Strales; - FFBNW 2 × ODLS Oto Melara
- Aircraft carried: 2 helicopters AW-101
- Aviation facilities: Hangar for 2 helicopters AW-101; 24 m × 27.6 m (79 ft × 91 ft) flight deck for 1 × CH-53 or MV-22 tilt-rotor
- Notes: 4 × RAS (replenishment at sea) Hepburn stations; 1 × Astern Fuelling Station (F76-F44); 2 × 30 tonnes to 20 m, stabilized cranes (one, on left, for offshore duties); 2 × 7.3 m (24 ft) RHIB; 2 × 10 m (33 ft) tenders; FFBNW 2 × CB90 type boats; Transported cargoes up to 15,500 t (15,300 long tons)

The Vulcano class is a class of replenishment oiler used by the Italian Navy, with lead ship Vulcano of the class entering service on 12 March 2021. The ships are designed to support fleet operations with fuel and dry stores and expected to replace the Stromboli class, another class of replenishment oiler from the Navy. Vulcano was financed under the 2014 Naval Law, for €346 million, then increased to €374.6 million, when the length was extended by 12 metres (39 ft). A second ship Atlante was ordered in January 2022 for projected delivery in 2025. The Navy also had an option for a third ship of the class. However, under the Italian MoD’s Multi-Year Defence Planning Document (Documento Programmatico Pluriennale della Difesa, DPP) for the 2023-2025 timeframe, a fourth ship was added to the program.

The French Navy through OCCAR ordered three modified ships of the class to replace its Durance-class tankers to be delivered in 2023, 2025 and 2027. A fourth ship to be ordered is projected for service entry after 2030. The program is known as the Bâtiment ravitailleur de forces (BRF). France officially joined the program in October 2018. The French BRF ships are 1 metre (3 ft 3 in) longer at 194 m (636 ft 6 in) and 31,000 tonnes full load displacement compared to 27,200 tonnes, reflecting the French fleet's greater need for aviation fuel.

== Design and construction ==
Vulcano was built by Fincantieri as yard number 6259. The stern section was built at the Riva Trigoso Naval Shipyard and the bow section was built at the Castellammare di Stabia (Naples) Naval Shipyard. On the night of 22/23 July 2018, a fire broke out on the ship's stern superstructure.

Vulcano is designed as a support ship able to supply a large naval squadron at sea. She was commissioned in March 2021. The lead ship of the French Navy's Jacques Chevallier sub-class began sea trials in December 2022 and was commissioned in November 2024. Steel was cut on a second ship for the French Navy in February 2022 and on a second ship for the Italian Navy in July 2022. The second vessels for the French and Italian navies (Jacques Stosskopf & Atlante) both began sea trials in the first half of 2025.

The ships have the capability to:

- refuel ships
- produce fresh water
- carry cargo
- Hospital NATO Role 2 LM
- conduct repairs at sea with integrated maintenance workshops

She has a cargo capacity of up to 15,500 t, of which, "at least":

- 7.655 t (7.534 long tons) (+9,000 m3) of NATO F76 diesel fuel
- 3.240 t (3.189 long tons) (+4,000 m3) of NATO F44/JP5 aviation fuel
- 830 t (820 long tons) of fresh water
- 220 t (220 long tons) of ammunitions
- 40 t (39 long tons) of meals (30,000 food rations)
- 3 m3 of gasoline in barrels
- 15 t (15 long tons) of lubricant in barrels
- 20 t (20 long tons) of solid goods
- up to 8 × ISO1C standard containers, 28 t (28 long tons) each one

== Ships of the class ==
Italics indicate the estimated date

Pennant no.	Name	Builder	Laid down	Launched	Commissioned	Homeport
Italian Navy
A 5335	Vulcano	Fincantieri (Muggiano)	13 October 2016	22 June 2018	12 March 2021	Taranto
A 5336	Atlante	Fincantieri (Muggiano)	28 June 2023	18 May 2024	19 December 2025	Taranto
TBC	TBC	Fincantieri (Muggiano)			TBC	
French Navy Bâtiment ravitailleur de forces
A 725	Jacques Chevallier	Chantiers de l'Atlantique (Saint-Nazaire)	24 December 2021	29 April 2022	20 November 2024	Toulon; first steel cut in May 2020
A 726	Jacques Stosskopf	Chantiers de l'Atlantique (Saint-Nazaire)	6 December 2022	19 August 2024	18 May 2026	Toulon
	Émile Bertin	Chantiers de l'Atlantique (Saint-Nazaire)	8 August 2024	3 April 2026	2027	Brest
	Gustave Zédé	Chantiers de l'Atlantique (Saint-Nazaire)	TBC		Projected 2032	Toulon
