= Combined diesel–electric and diesel =

Marine propulsion system

Combined marine propulsion

Combined diesel or gas (CODOG)
Combined diesel and gas (CODAG)
Combined diesel-electric and diesel (CODLAD)
Combined diesel–electric and gas (CODLAG)
Combined diesel and diesel (CODAD)
Combined steam and gas (COSAG)
Combined gas or gas (COGOG)
Combined gas and gas (COGAG)
Combined gas and steam (COGAS)
Combined nuclear and steam propulsion (CONAS)
Integrated electric propulsion (IEP or IFEP)

Combined diesel-electric and diesel (CODLAD) is a naval propulsion system in which an electric motor and a diesel engine act on a single propeller. The transmission system takes care of making one or both motors act on the propeller shaft.

== Description ==
The CODLAD propulsion system is based on the use of electric motors directly connected to the axes (generally two) of the propellers. The electric motors are powered by diesel generators and to have higher speeds, as happens in CODAD propulsion systems, the higher power diesel engine is inserted which is disconnected from the transmission system to return to cruising speed.

This system that uses diesel engines for both propulsion and for the production of electricity for on-board services significantly reduces costs, as the number of diesel engines for the various ship services decreases and the electric motors need less maintenance. Furthermore, since electric motors can work more effectively in a larger number of revolutions, and being directly connected to the propeller axis, the transmission systems for coupling and decoupling the diesel-electric systems with the diesel engines used to have higher speeds.

The CODLAD system has been adopted in the new Vulcano-class logistic support ship under construction for the Italian Navy.
