= Stromboli-class replenishment oiler =

Class of Italian naval auxilliary ships

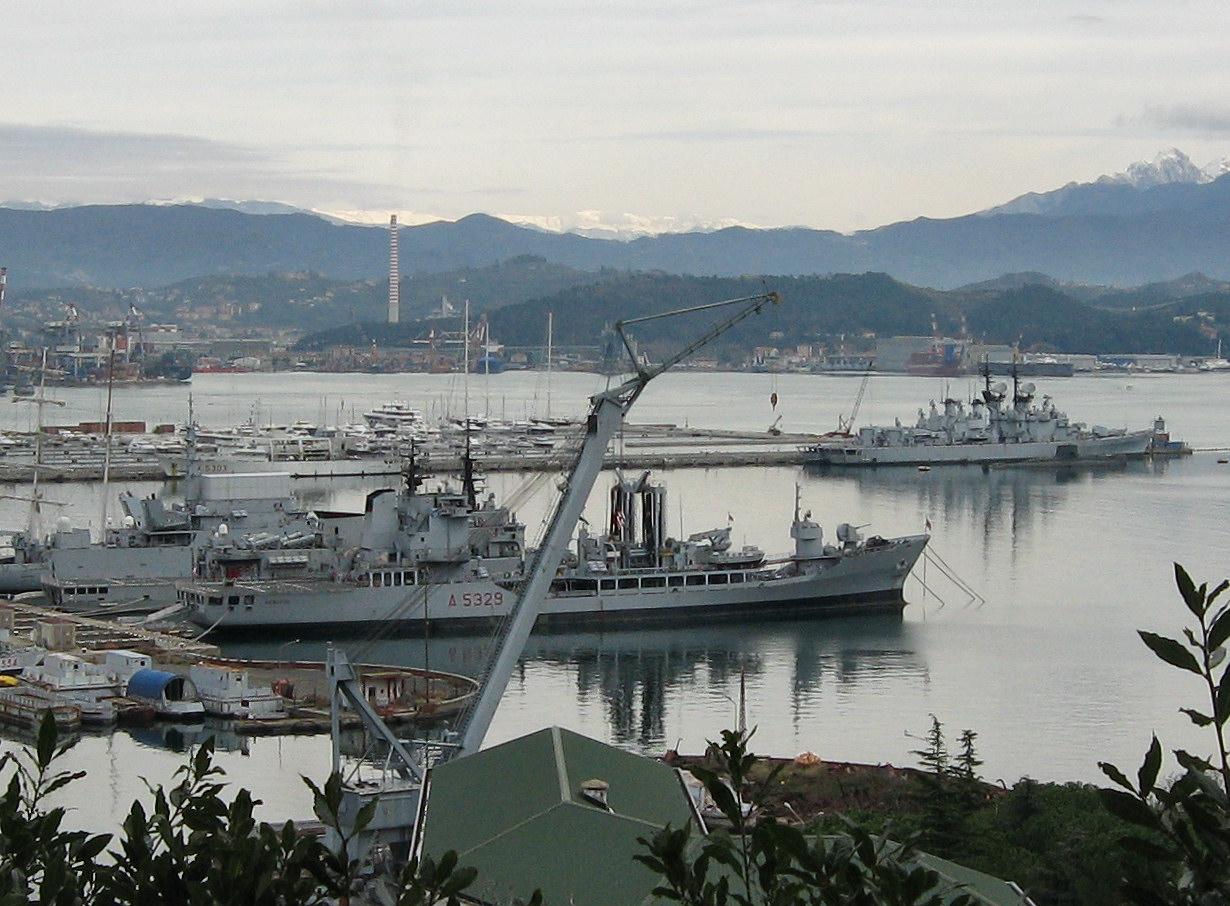
- Vesuvio (A 5329) in 2009

Class overview
- Name: Stromboli
- Builders: Cantieri Navali del Tirreno e Riuniti Riva Trigoso (La Spezia); Castellammare di Stabia (Naples)
- Operators: Italian Navy; Iraqi Navy
- Succeeded by: Etna class
- In commission: 1975–1978
- Completed: 3 (2 for Italy and 1 for Iraq)
- Active: 1 (Italy)
- Retired: 1 (Italy)

General characteristics
- Type: Replenishment oiler
- Displacement: - 9.100 t (8.956 long tons) full load; 4.200 t (4.134 long tons) to empty ship
- Length: 129 m (423 ft) LOA
- Beam: 18 m (59 ft)
- Depth: 6.5 m (21 ft)
- Propulsion: - 1 × shafts; - 2 × diesel engines Grandi Motori Trieste GMT C420.8-SS1, 3.529 kW (4.732 bhp) each; - 2 × diesel engines generator Grandi Motori Trieste GMT A230.12M, 1.250 kW (1.676 bhp) each; - 2 × diesel engines generator Grandi Motori Trieste GMT A230.6, 600 kW (800 bhp) each; - 1 × emergency diesel engine generator Grandi Motori Trieste GMT A-230-6, 503 kW (675 bhp)
- Speed: 18 knots (33 km/h; 21 mph)
- Range: 4,000 nmi (7,400 km; 4,600 mi) to 14 knots (26 km/h; 16 mph)
- Complement: 12 officers, 120 enlisted
- Sensors & processing systems: - 1 x surface radar Selex ES SMA MM/SPS/702; - 2 × navigation radar GEM Elettronica (MM/SPN-753 and MM/SPN-754); - 1 × fire direction radar Selenia Orion RTN-10X; - 1 × SICRAL 1, 1B and 2 satellite communication system; - 3 satellite communication systems
- Armament: Stromboli and Vesuvio; - 1 × OTO Melara 76/62mm Allargato gun; - 2 × OTO Melara - Oerlikon KBA 25 mm/80 calibre guns; - 2 × MG 42/59 7. 62 mm; Agnadeen; - 1 x OTO Melara 76 mm/62 calibre Compatto gun; - 2 x MG 42/59 7.62 mm
- Aviation facilities: Flight deck for SH-90 and AW-101 helicopters.
- Notes: 2 × RAS systems

The Stromboli class is a series of two replenishment oilers used by the Marina Militare since 1975. They are to be replaced by the Vulcano class beginning in 2019.

The ships are capable of loading:

- 4.000 t (3.937 long tons) of NATO F76 diesel fuel
- 400 t (390 long tons) of NATO F44/JP5 aviation fuel
- 300 t (300 long tons) of solid goods

== Ships ==
Stromboli class
Ship	Navy	Pennant number	Shipyard	Hull number	Laid down	Launched	Commissioned	Motto	Note
Stromboli	Italian Navy	A 5327	Riva Trigoso (La Spezia)	298	1 October 1973	20 February 1975	31 October 1975	Nunquam Satis	
Vesuvio	Italian Navy	A 5329	Riva Trigoso (La Spezia)	857	1 July 1974	4 June 1977	31 October 1978	Defende me servabo te	Retired 2023
Agnadeen	Iraqi Navy	A 102	Castellammare di Stabia (Naples)	4389 (833)	29 January 1982	22 October 1982	29 October 1984		held in Alexandria (Egypt) never delivered
