= Italian ship Vulcano =

Italian naval auxiliary oiler ship

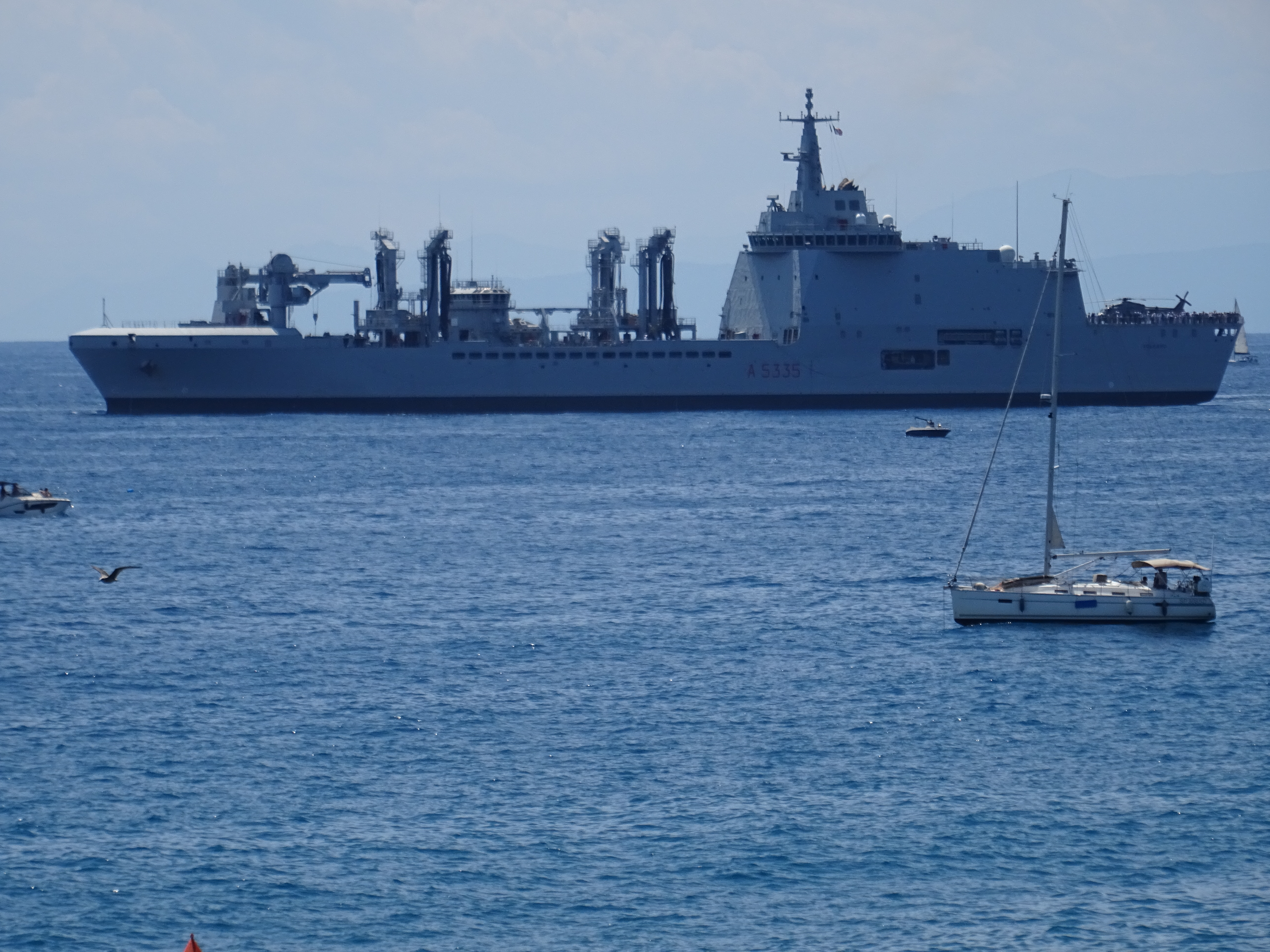

History

Italy
- Name: Vulcano
- Ordered: 2015
- Builder: Fincantieri
- Launched: 2018
- Commissioned: March 2021
- In service: in active service, as of February 2024
- Identification: Pennant number A 5335

General characteristics
- Class & type: Vulcano-class logistic support ship
- Displacement: 27,200 tons
- Length: 193 m (633 ft)
- Speed: 20 kn (37 km/h; 23 mph)
- Complement: 235
- Aircraft carried: 2 EH-101 helicopters

Vulcano (A 5335) (Italian: Nave Vulcano (m)) is a warship of the Italian Navy, a Vulcano-class logistic support ship, the lead ship in its class. It was built as part of a joint project between Italy and France to build such ships. It is a replenishment oiler auxiliary ship. Vulcano has the pennant number A 5335.

== Specifications ==
- Name: Vulcano
- Pennant number: A 5335
- Yard number: 6259
- Ship's complement: 235 personnel
- Passenger quarters: 200 people
- Length: 193 m (633 ft)
- Speed: 20 kn (37 km/h; 23 mph)
- Displacement: 27,200 tons
- Embarkment for 8× 20 ft (6.1 m) mission modules, for personnel and healthcare
- Drinking water creation for supply to land
- 2500 kW power creation for supply to land
- Onboard crane for lift of 30 tonnes (30 long tons; 33 short tons)
- Helicopter operations
  - Helicopter hangar
  - Maintenance and repair
  - 2× EH-101 helicopters
- Small boat operations
- At-sea rescue and recovery operations capability
- Naval command and control centre
- Naval communications centre
- Non-lethal defensive array

Supply operations

Vulcano functions as a logistics vessel a naval supply ship for delivery of supplies to naval operations and transfer to other ships

- Fuel replenishment
- Water replenishment
- Food replenishment
- Parts replenishment
- Ammo replenishment

Hospital operations

Vulcano also functions as a floating hospital, hospital ship

- Operating rooms
- Radiology rooms
- Analysis rooms
- Dental office
- 17 bed hospital ward

== History ==
Vulcano was ordered by Italy in 2015 as a logistics support ship. The logistics support ship was built by Fincantieri at the Naval Integrated Shipyard in Muggiano In 2019, four more ships were ordered by France in the pattern of Vulcano, the Vulcano-class logistic support ship. Vulcano was launched in 2018. She started sea trials in December 2019. Vulcano was delivered to the Italian Navy in March 2021. She was later commissioned into the Italian Navy, also in March 2021.

In December 2023, the ship was deployed to Arish, Sinai, Egypt; on the Mediterranean coast, for relief operations as a floating hospital, in the Gaza war between Hamas and Israel, for residents of the Gaza Strip. On board were medical crews from the Italian Army, Navy, Air Force. At the end of January 2024, Vulcano left Arish to return Italy, with patients aboard for further treatment in Italy. The vessel returned to La Spezia, Italy by the beginning of February 2024.

== See also ==
- List of ships built by Fincantieri
- List of active Italian Navy ships
- French ship Dixmude (L9015), French Navy assault ship used as a hospital ship in 2024 at El-Arish, Egypt for Hamas-Israel Gaza War relief, deployed November 2023 to February 2024
- KRI dr. Radjiman Wedyodiningrat (992), Indonesian Navy hospital ship used for aid in 2024 at Al-Arish, Egypt for Hamas-Israel Gaza War relief, deployed December 2024 to January 2024
