= Boraida-class replenishment oiler =

Saudi replenishment oiler ship

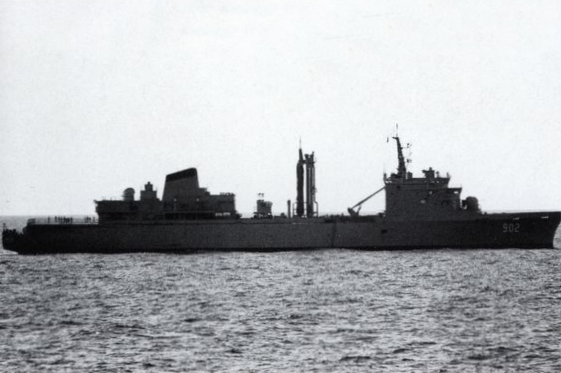
- Boraida underway in the Red Sea in 1991

Class overview
- Name: Boraida class
- Builders: La Ciotat shipyard, Marseille, France
- Operators: Royal Saudi Navy
- Built: 1983–1984
- Planned: 2
- Completed: 2
- Active: 2

General characteristics
- Type: Replenishment oiler
- Displacement: 10,700 t (10,500 long tons); 11,400 t (11,200 long tons) (full load)
- Length: 135 m (442 ft 11 in)
- Beam: 18.7 m (61 ft 4 in)
- Draught: 7 m (23 ft 0 in)
- Propulsion: 2 x SEMT Pielstick 14 PC2.5 V 400 diesel engines; 13,600 kW (18,200 hp); 2 × shafts
- Speed: 20.5 knots (38.0 km/h; 23.6 mph)
- Range: 7,000 nmi (13,000 km; 8,100 mi) at 15 knots (28 km/h; 17 mph)
- Complement: 140
- Sensors & processing systems: 2 × CSEE Naja optronic fire control directors; 2 × CSEE Lynx optical sights
- Armament: 2 x twin Breda Bofors 40 mm/70 guns
- Aircraft carried: 2 x Eurocopter AS365 Dauphin or 1 x Eurocopter AS332 Super Puma
- Aviation facilities: Hangar and flight deck

The Boraida class is a ship class of two replenishment oilers built for the Royal Saudi Navy by CN la Ciotat at Marseille, France. It is a modified version of the French Durance-class replenishment ship. They were constructed in 1983 and entered service in 1984. The two ships are based at Jeddah, Saudi Arabia.

== Design and description ==
Two ships of the French Durance-class replenishment oilers were ordered by the Royal Saudi Navy in October 1980 to a modified design. The Boraida class have a standard displacement of 10,700 tonnes (10,500 long tons) and 11,400 t (11,200 long tons) at full load. They are 135 metres (442 ft 11 in) long with a beam of 18.7 metres (61 ft 4 in), and a draught of 7 metres (23 ft 0 in). The ships are powered by two SEMT Pielstick 14 PC2.5 V 400 diesel engines turning two shafts with LIPS controllable pitch propellers rated at 13,600 kilowatts (18,200 hp). The ships have a top speed of 20.5 knots (38.0 km/h; 23.6 mph), a range of 7,000 nautical miles (13,000 km; 8,100 mi) at 15 knots (28 km/h; 17 mph) and endurance for 30 days. They have a complement of 140, with accommodation for 55 cadets.

Each ship has two dual solid/liquid underway transfer stations per side and can replenish one ship per side and one astern. The Boraida class can carry 4,420 t (4,350 long tons) of diesel, 36 t (35 long tons) of aviation fuel, 140 t (140 long tons) of freshwater, 100 t (100 long tons) of ammunition, and 100 t (100 long tons) of supplies. The ships are armed with two turrets with twin Breda Bofors 40 mm (1.6 in) guns. For weapons control the Boraida class is equipped with two CSEE Naja optronic fire control directors and two CSEE Lynx optical sights and have two Decca navigational radars. They have an aft helicopter deck, and can carry either one Eurocopter AS332 Super Puma or two Eurocopter AS365 Dauphin helicopters. The helicopters can be armed with anti-submarine and anti-ship weapons.

== Ships ==
Boraida class construction data
Pennant no.	Name	Builder	Laid down	Launched	Commissioned	Status
902	Boraida	La Ciotat, Marseille, France	13 April 1982	22 January 1983	29 February 1984	In service
904	Yunbou	La Ciotat, Marseille, France	9 October 1983	20 October 1984	29 August 1985	In service

== Construction and career ==
The two ships were ordered as part of the Sawari programme. Both ships were built at the La Ciotat shipyard in Marseille, France. The lead ship of the class, Boraida, was laid down on 13 April 1982. The ship entered service on 29 February 1984. Yunbou was laid down on 9 October 1983 and entered service on 29 August 1985. They are used primarily as training, depot and maintenance ships. Both ships are based at Jeddah, Saudi Arabia. In 1996–1998, the two ships underwent a major refit by DCNS at Toulon, France. In 2013 an agreement was reached between France and Saudi Arabia for a life-extension program for the two ships. The refit will include the installation of one launcher for Simbad Mistral surface-to-air missiles. The refits will take place in Saudi Arabia.
