= French tanker Durance =

1975 Durance-class tanker

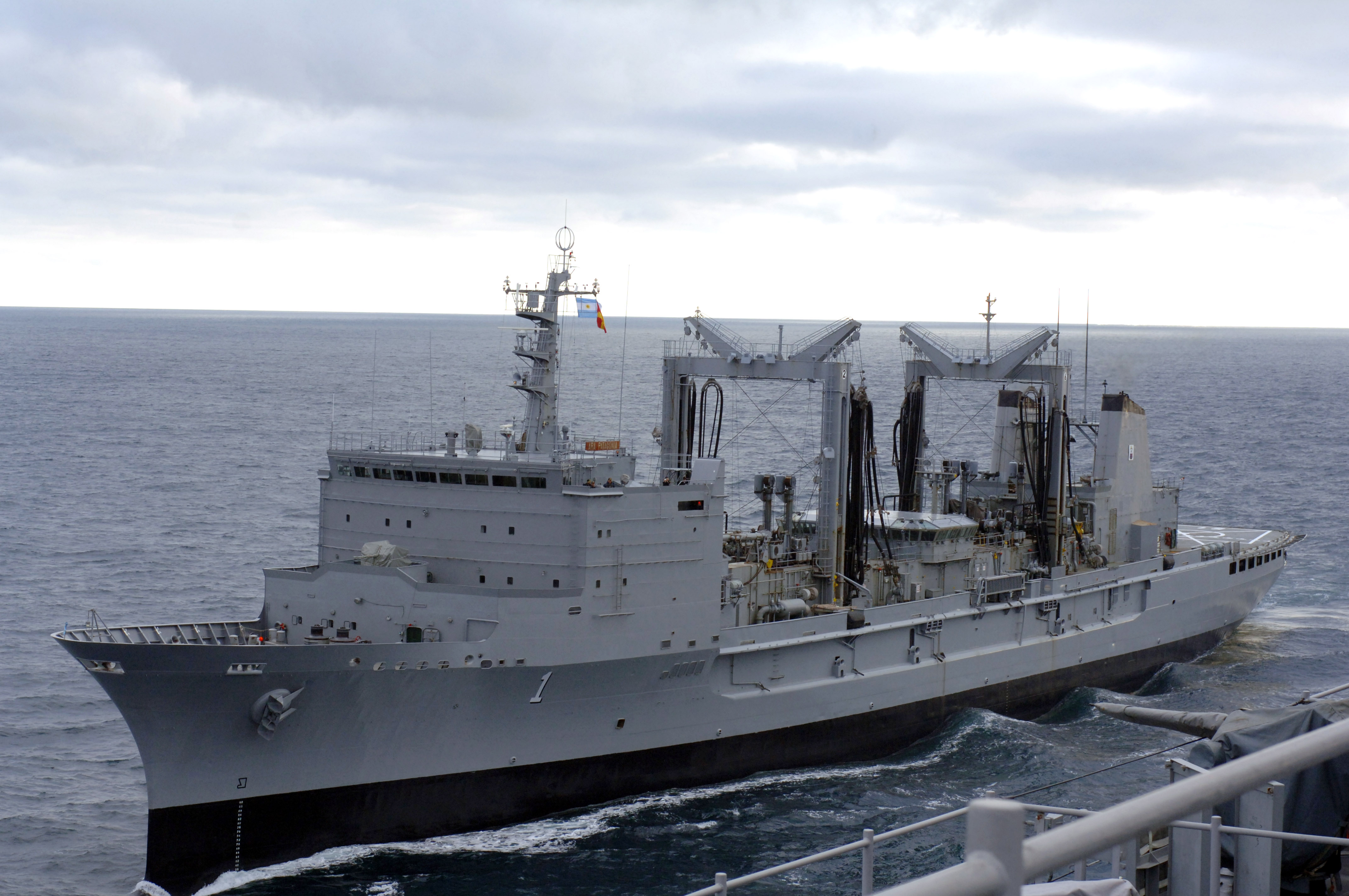
- ARA Patagonia during UNITAS manoeuvres

History

France
- Name: Durance
- Namesake: Durance
- Builder: Brest Arsenal, Brest
- Laid down: 12 December 1973
- Launched: 6 September 1975
- Commissioned: 1 December 1976
- Decommissioned: 5 December 1997
- Identification: Pennant number A 629
- Fate: Sold to Argentina

Argentina
- Name: Patagonia
- Namesake: Patagonia
- Acquired: 12 July 1999
- Commissioned: 9 July 2000
- Identification: Pennant number: B-1; MMSI number: 701000016; Callsign: LOPT
- Status: In active service

General characteristics
- Class & type: Durance-class tanker
- Displacement: 7,700 t (7,600 long tons) standard; 18,200 t (17,900 long tons) (full load)
- Length: 157.2 m (515 ft 9 in)
- Beam: 21.2 m (69 ft 7 in)
- Draught: 8.65 m (28 ft 5 in) (average); 10.8 m (35 ft 5 in) (full load)
- Propulsion: 2 × SEMT Pielstick 16 PC2-5 V 400 diesel engines; 2 × shafts, 15,000 kW (20,000 hp)
- Speed: 19 knots (35 km/h; 22 mph)
- Range: 9,000 nmi (17,000 km; 10,000 mi) at 15 knots (28 km/h; 17 mph)
- Sensors & processing systems: 2 × 1226 radars
- Armament: 2 × Bofors 40 mm (1.6 in)/L60 AA guns; 4 × 12.7 mm (0.5 in) machine guns
- Aircraft carried: 1 helicopter
- Aviation facilities: Helicopter deck and hangar

ARA Patagonia (B-1) is a multi-product replenishment oiler of the Durance class in service in the Argentine Navy. She was the lead ship of her class serving in the French Navy as Durance (A 629) from 1977 to 1999. In French service, the ship served with the Force d'action navale (FAR, "Naval Action Force"). In Argentine service the vessel is used in multi-national naval exercises and supplies the Antarctic missions operating from Ushuaia. In 2017, Patagonia was used to search for the missing submarine ARA San Juan.

== Description ==
In French service, the first two ships of the Durance class were dubbed Pétrolier Ravitailleur d'Escadre (PRE, "fleet replenishment oiler"). Durance as constructed, carried two cranes abaft the bridge. Durance has a standard displacement of 7,700 tonnes (7,600 long tons) and 18,200 t (17,900 long tons) at full load. Durance is 157.3 metres (516 ft 1 in) long overall and 149 m (488 ft 10 in) between perpendiculars with a beam of 21.2 m (69 ft 7 in) and a draught of 8.65 m (28 ft 5 in) empty and 10.8 m (35 ft 5 in) at full load. The ship is powered by two SEMT Pielstick 16 PC2.5 V 400 diesel engines turning two LIPS controllable pitch propellers rated at 15,000 kilowatts (20,000 hp). The vessel has a maximum speed of 19 knots (35 km/h; 22 mph) and a range of 9,000 nmi (17,000 km; 10,000 mi) at 15 knots (28 km/h; 17 mph).

Durance was equipped with two landing craft for vehicles and personnel. The ship has two dual solid/liquid underway transfer stations per side and can replenish two ships per side and one astern. As built, Durance had capacity for 7,600 t (7,500 long tons) of fuel oil, 1,500 t (1,500 long tons) of diesel oil, 510 t (500 long tons) of JP-5 aviation fuel, 130 t (130 long tons) of distilled water, 170 t (170 long tons) of provisions, 150 t (150 long tons) of munitions and 51 t (50 long tons) of spare parts.

The Durance-class tankers all mount a flight deck over the stern and a hangar. The ship utilised Aérospatiale Alouette III and Westland Lynx helicopters in French service, but are capable of operating larger ones from their flight deck. For defence, Durance was armed with twin-mounted Bofors 40 mm (1.6 in)/L60 (Note: L60 describes the gun's calibre and denotes the length of the gun. This means that the length of the gun barrel is 60 times the bore diameter.) anti-aircraft (AA) guns and four 12.7 mm (0.5 in) machine guns. The ship is equipped with two Racal Decca 1226 radars. In Argentine service, Patagonia has a complement of 164 including 10 officers with accommodation for 29 more.

== Construction and career ==
=== French service ===
Durance was the first ship ordered in its class, and was constructed by the Arsenal de Brest at Brest, France, with its keel laid down on 10 December 1973. The ship was launched on 6 September 1975. The vessel entered service on 1 December 1976. In French service, the ship was assigned to the Force d'action navale (FAR, "Naval Action Force"). Durance was decommissioned on 5 December 1997 and placed in reserve. The ship was sold to the Argentine Navy on 12 July 1999.

=== Argentine service ===
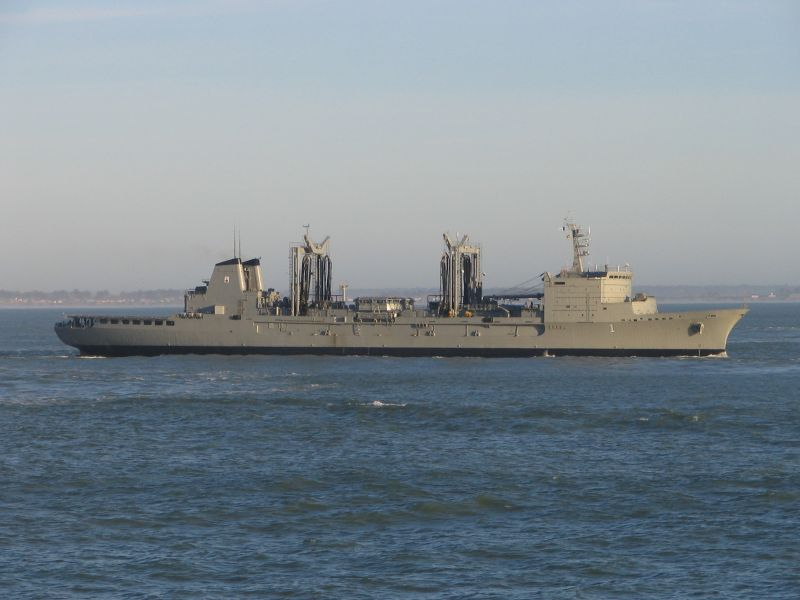
ARA Patagonia in 2005

Renamed ARA Patagonia, the replenishment ship arrived at Puerto Belgrano on 29 August 1999 where she spent one year in drydock receiving an overhaul of her engines and hull. She was commissioned with the pennant number B-1 (LGPA) into the Amphibious and Logistic Naval Command (COAL) of the fleet on 9 July 2000 and made her first voyage in the following month. Since then Patagonia has participated in numerous exercises and operations within the fleet and foreign navies including Pre-Unitas, UNITAS, Gringo-Gaucho, Atlasur, PASSEX, Ghost, and Fraterno with the United States, Chile, Brazil and Spain among others. The ship is annually deployed south during the Antarctic summer campaigns to supply ARA Almirante Irízar and ARA Puerto Deseado operating from Ushuaia.

In May 2005 about 30 congressmen from Argentina and Chile celebrated the 20 anniversary of the Peace and Friendship Treaty aboard Patagonia. In 2010 she served as support/control unit for the tall ships regatta that took part of the Argentina Bicentennial celebrations. In November 2017, Patagonia was used in the search for the missing Argentine submarine ARA San Juan. The ship was reported non-operational in 2020. However, as of 2022 it was designated to participate in UNITAS 2022 exercises in Brazil. In October 2022, it was reported that the Argentine defence ministry had allocated funding for a refit of the ship to be carried out at the Puerto Belgrano Naval Arsenal in collaboration with the Tandanor shipyard. The ship was reported to have entered dry dock in early 2023. Work on the ship, involving general maintenance and repair, was reported to have been completed in June 2023.
