= Durance-class tanker =

Class of French Navy replenishment oiler

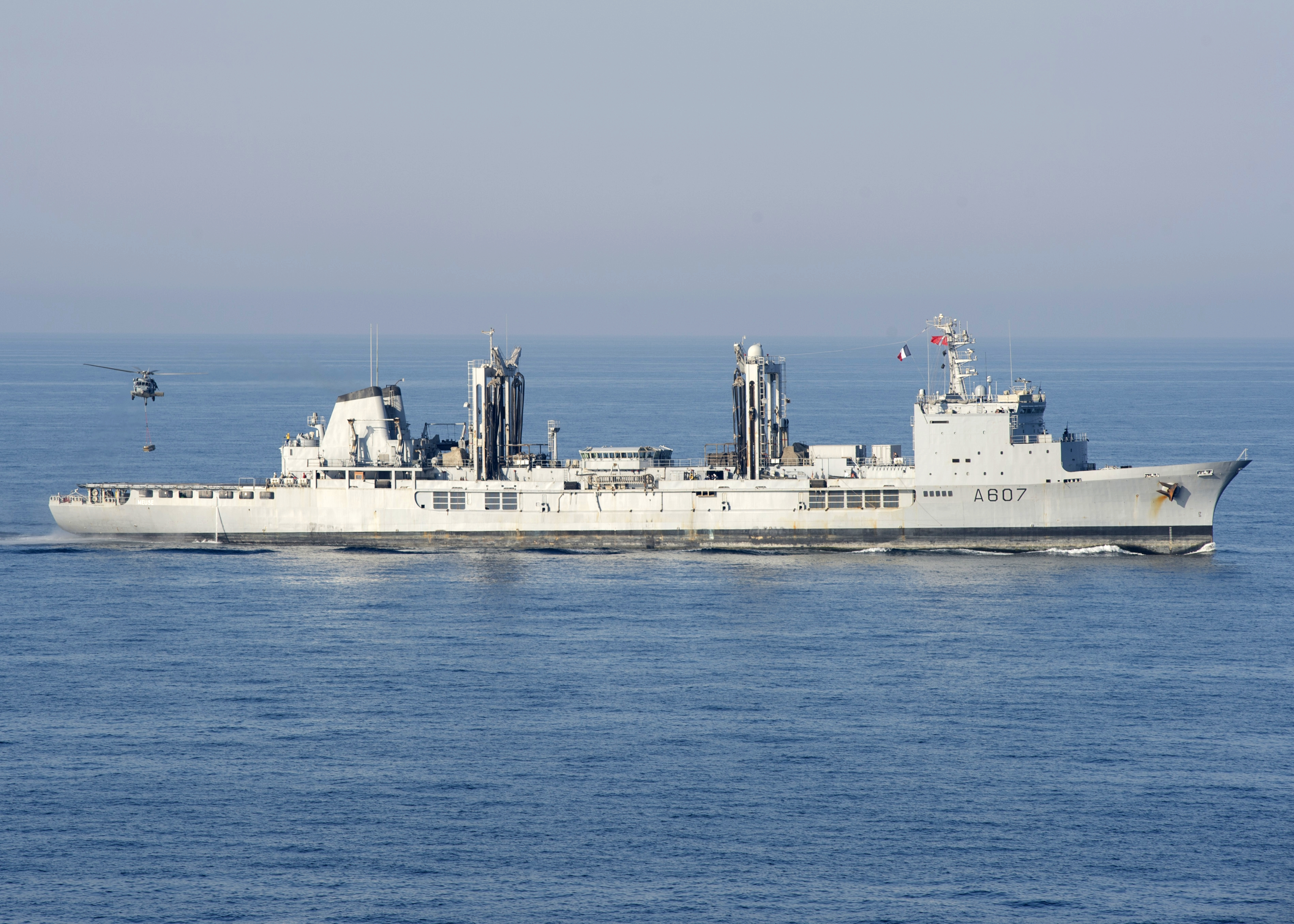
- Meuse in the Arabian Sea, 2 March 2015

Class overview
- Name: Durance class
- Operators: French Navy; Argentine Navy; Royal Saudi Navy; Royal Australian Navy (retired)
- Succeeded by: Jacques Chevallier class
- Subclasses: Boraida class
- Built: 1973–1990
- Completed: 8
- Active: 4
- Retired: 4

General characteristics of French ships
- Type: Replenishment oiler
- Displacement: 7,700–7,900 t (7,600–7,800 long tons) standard; 18,200–18,800 t (17,900–18,500 long tons) (full load)
- Length: 157.2 m (515 ft 9 in)
- Beam: 21.2 m (69 ft 7 in)
- Draught: 8.65 m (28 ft 5 in) standard; 10.8 m (35 ft 5 in) full load
- Propulsion: 2 × SEMT Pielstick 16 PC2.5 V 400 diesel engines; 2 shafts, 15,000 kW (20,000 hp)
- Speed: 19 knots (35 km/h; 22 mph)
- Range: 9,000 nmi (17,000 km; 10,000 mi) at 15 knots (28 km/h; 17 mph)
- Complement: 162
- Sensors & processing systems: 2 × DRBN 34 radars
- Armament: 1 × Bofors 40 mm (1.6 in)/L60 gun; 4 × 12.7 mm (0.5 in) M2 Browning machine guns; 3 × Simbad Mistral missile launcher
- Aviation facilities: Medium helicopter pad

The Durance class is a series of multi-product replenishment oilers, originally designed and built for service in the French Navy. Besides the five ships built for the French Navy, a sixth was built for the Royal Australian Navy, while the lead ship of the class currently serves with the Argentine Navy. Two ships of a similar but smaller design are in service with the Royal Saudi Navy as the Boraida-class replenishment oilers.

In French Navy service the ships were used with the Force d'action navale (FAN, "Naval Action Force"). The last three French ships were built to a modified design with increased space for command operations. The three ships are used as flagships for French naval forces in the Indian Ocean. In 2009, Somme repelled an attack by pirates off the coast of Somalia. The lead ship of the class (Durance) was transferred from France to Argentina in 1999/2000. In 2015, the second French ship was removed from service, followed by a third in 2021 and a fourth in 2023. In 2019, the Australian ship (HMAS Success) was also taken out of service.

== French Navy ==
=== Design and description ===
In French service, the class the first two ships were dubbed Pétrolier Ravitailleur d'Escadre (PRE, "fleet replenishment oiler"), and the final three, Bâtiment de commandement et ravitailleur (BCR, "command and replenishment ship"). In addition to their role as a fleet tanker, the three dubbed BCR can accommodate an entire general staff and thus supervise naval operations. Meuse, which had a superstructure that was one deck higher than Durance, the lead ship of the class and the final three ships of the class, Var, Marne and Somme all had superstructures that were extended aft by 8 m (26 ft) to accommodate the additional staff requirements. The first two ships carry two cranes abaft the bridge, while the final three only have one positioned along the centreline.

The five ships are of similar design but different layouts. Durance and Meuse had a standard displacement of 7,700 tonnes (7,600 long tons) and 18,200 t (17,900 long tons) at full load. Marne, Var and Somme have a standard displacement of 7,900 t (7,800 long tons) and 18,800 t (18,500 long tons) at full load. All five ships are 157.3 metres (516 ft 1 in) long overall and 149 m (488 ft 10 in) between perpendiculars with a beam of 21.2 m (69 ft 7 in) and a draught of 8.65 m (28 ft 5 in) empty and 10.8 m (35 ft 5 in) at full load. All five vessels are powered by two SEMT Pielstick 16 PC2.5 V 400 diesel engines turning two LIPS controllable pitch propellers rated at 15,000 kilowatts (20,000 hp). The vessels have a maximum speed of 19 knots (35 km/h; 22 mph) and a range of 9,000 nmi (17,000 km; 10,000 mi) at 15 knots (28 km/h; 17 mph).

Durance was initially equipped with two landing craft for vehicles and personnel. Each ship has two dual solid/liquid underway transfer stations per side and can replenish two ships per side and one astern. As built, Durance had capacity for 7,600 t (7,500 long tons) of fuel oil, 1,500 t (1,500 long tons) of diesel oil, 510 t (500 long tons) of JP-5 aviation fuel, 130 t (130 long tons) of distilled water, 170 t (170 long tons) of provisions, 150 t (150 long tons) of munitions and 51 t (50 long tons) of spare parts. Meuse had capacity for 5,170 t (5,090 long tons) of fuel oil, 4,078 t (4,014 long tons) of diesel, 1,160 t (1,140 long tons) of JP-5 aviation fuel, 250 t (250 long tons) of distilled water, 180 t (180 long tons) of provisions, 124 t (122 long tons) of munitions and 46 t (45 long tons) of spare parts. The final three ships of the class differed from Meuse by carrying 3,360 t (3,310 long tons) of diesel fuel, 1,160 t (1,140 long tons) of JP-5 aviation fuel, 170 t (170 long tons) of munitions and 15 t (15 long tons) of spare parts. These numbers changed with the needs of the fleet.

The Durance-class tankers all mount a flight deck over the stern and a hangar. The ships utilised Aérospatiale Alouette III and Westland Lynx helicopters (prior to the retirement of both types) but are capable of operating larger ones from their flight deck. For defence, Durance was armed with twin-mounted Bofors 40 mm (1.6 in)/L60 (Note: L60 describes the gun's calibre and denotes the length of the gun. This means that the length of the gun barrel is 60 times the bore diameter.) anti-aircraft (AA) guns. The other four ships initially mounted one Bofors 40 mm/L60 AA guns and two 20 mm (0.8 in) AA guns in a twin turret. They are equipped with two DRBN 34 navigational radars. The armament was later altered for the final four ships by removing the 20 mm guns and adding four 12.7 mm (0.5 in) M2 Browning machine guns and three launchers for Simbad Mistral surface-to-air missiles. Meuse had only one launcher installed. The ships have a complement of 162 and are capable of accommodating 250 personnel.

=== Ships in class ===
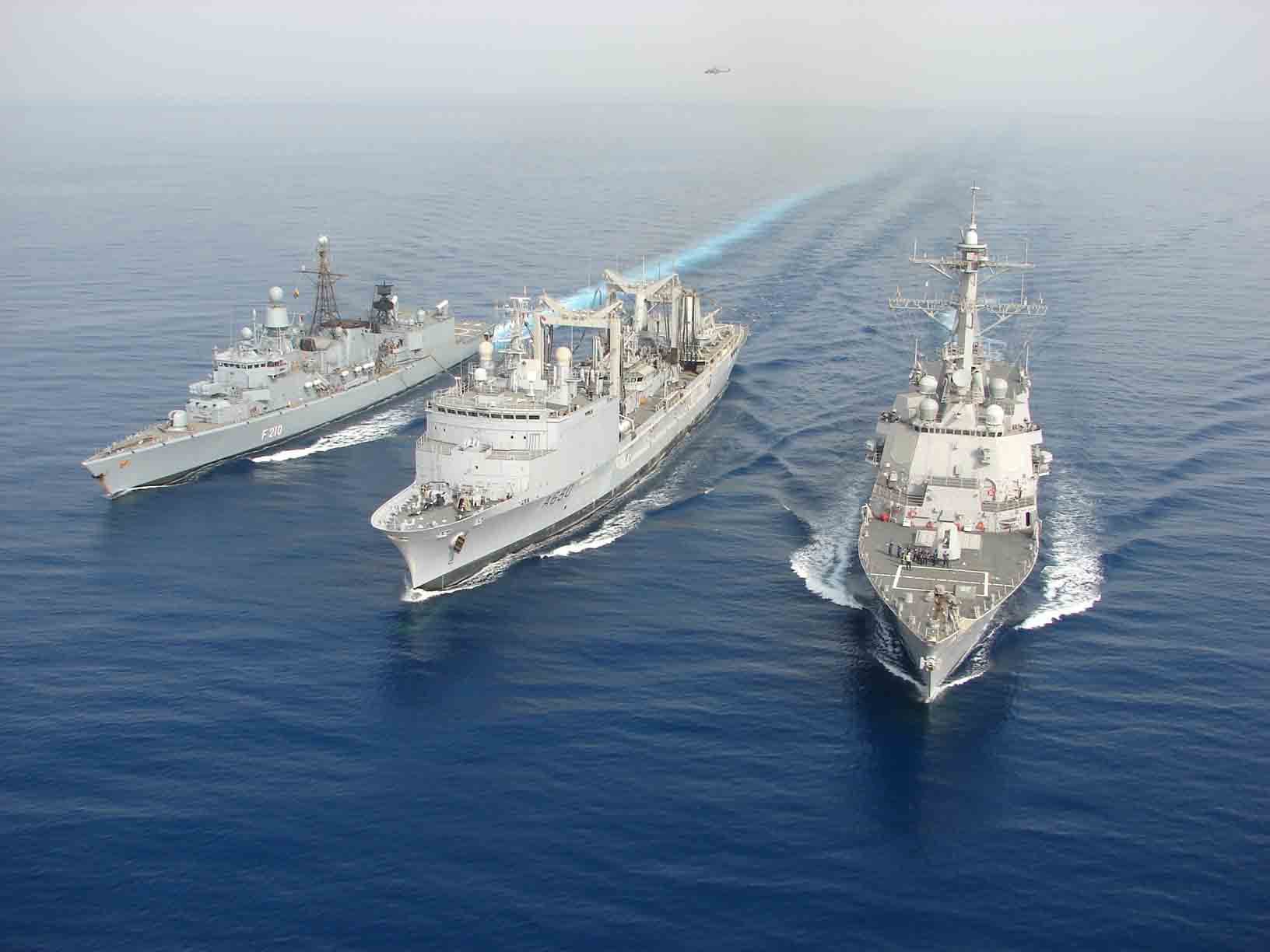
Marne (central) replenishing the German frigate Emden (left) and USS Shoup (right)

Five ships of the class were built for the French Navy:

Durance class construction data
Pennant	Name	Builder	Laid down	Launched	Commissioned	Status
A 629	Durance	Arsenal de Brest, Brest, France	10 December 1973	6 September 1975	1 December 1976	Sold to Argentina in July 1999, renamed ARA Patagonia
A 607	Meuse	Arsenal de Brest, Brest, France	2 June 1977	2 December 1978	21 November 1980	Decommissioned December 2015
A 608	Var	Arsenal de Brest, Brest, France	8 May 1979	1 June 1981	29 January 1983	Decommissioned 1 July 2021
A 630	Marne	Arsenal de Brest, Brest, France	4 August 1982	2 February 1985	16 January 1987	Decommissioned October 2023
A 631	Somme	Normed, La Seyne, France	3 May 1985	3 October 1987	7 March 1990	In service

Three ships of the class (Marne, Somme, and Var) were fitted out as flagships able to embark an admiral and his staff. The 2013 French White Paper on Defence and National Security planned to replace them with four new double-hulled tankers between 2018 and 2021. However, Meuse was decommissioned in December 2015, under budget cuts announced a year earlier. Var followed in 2021 and Marne in 2023. They will be replaced under the FLOTLOG project by four Bâtiment ravitailleur de forces vessels, with the first ship having been delivered in 2023 and the others to follow in 2025 and 2027, as well as a fourth projected after 2030.

=== Construction and career ===
The first four tankers were constructed by the Arsenal de Brest at Brest, France between 1973 and 1987. The fifth and final ship was ordered in March 1984 as part of the 1984–1988 plan and was built by Normed at their yard La Seyne, France. The Durance-class ships began entering service in 1976 were assigned to the Force d'action navale (FAR, "Naval Action Force"). Prior to 2010, one of the BCRs (Var, Marne or Somme) had been assigned to Indian Ocean as flagship of the French naval forces in the region. In October 2009, Somme repelled an attack by Somali pirates.

== Royal Australian Navy ==
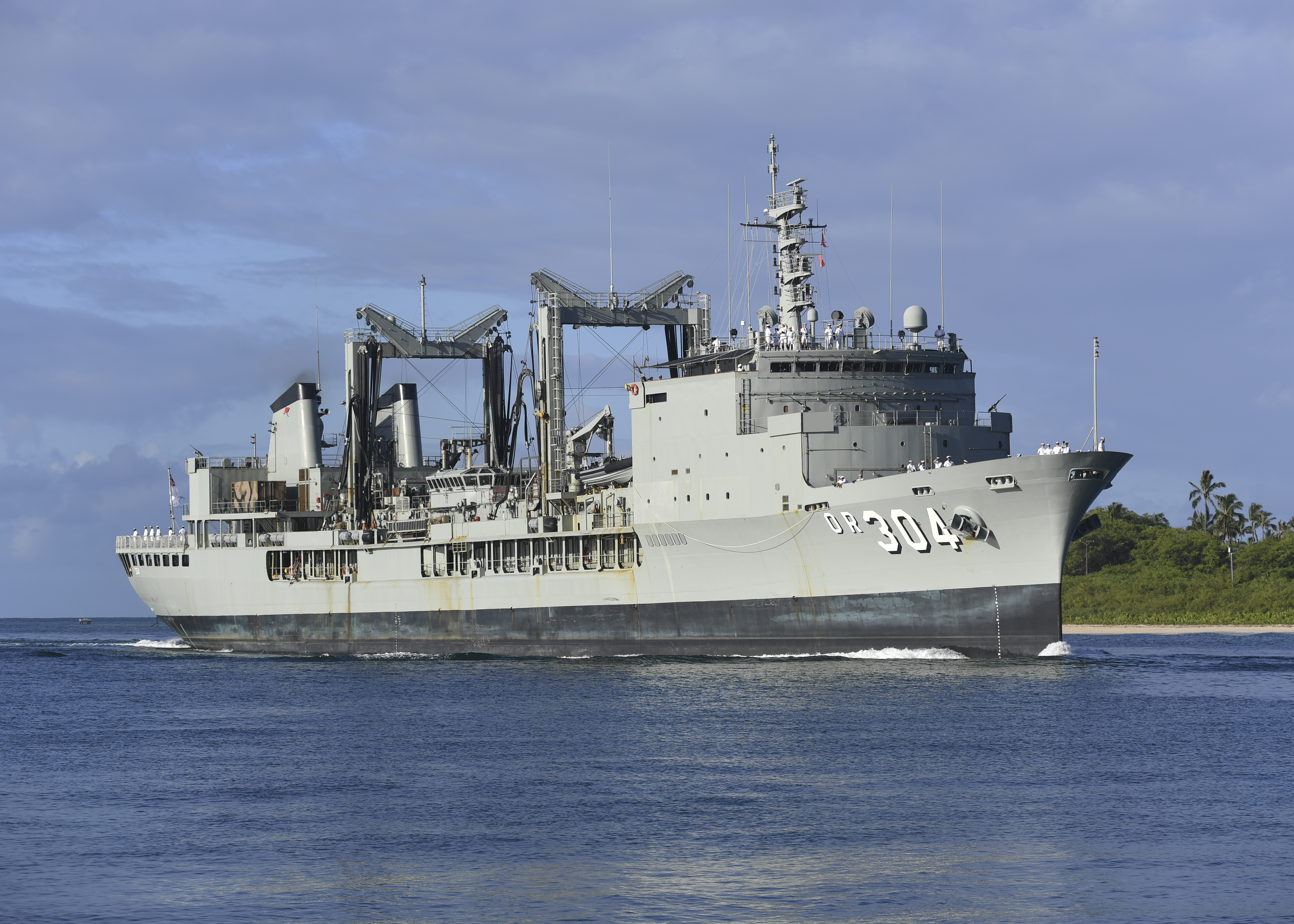
HMAS Success in 2018

The Royal Australian Navy (RAN) ordered one vessel, HMAS Success, of a modified design in September 1979. A second vessel was planned in 1980, but not optioned. Construction of Success was slow and costs increased. The modified Durance-class oiler is 157.2 m (515 ft 9 in) in length, with a beam of 21.2 m (69 ft 7 in), and a draught of 8.6 m (28 ft 3 in), with a full load displacement of 18,221 t (17,933 long tons). Propulsion machinery consisted of two SEMT-Pielstick 16 PC2.5 V 400 diesel motors, which supplied 15,500 kW (20,800 hp) to the ship's two propeller shafts. Top speed was 20 knots (37 km/h; 23 mph), and the ship had a range of 8,616 nmi (15,957 km; 9,915 mi) at 15 knots (28 km/h; 17 mph). Success had a total capacity of 10,200 tonnes of cargo: 8,707 tonnes of diesel fuel, 975 tonnes of aviation fuel, 250 tonnes of munitions (including guided missiles and torpedoes), 116 tonnes of water, 95 tonnes of components and naval stores, and 57 tonnes of food and other consumables. Fuel and liquid stores could be transferred from four points (two on each side), allowing Success to replenish two ships simultaneously, while solid cargo could be moved via vertical replenishment (with a hangar and helipad for a single Sea King, Seahawk, or Squirrel helicopter), or by boat (the RAN LCVP T 7 was carried on a starboard forward davit). The ship was armed with seven 12.7 mm machine guns, and was fitted for but not with a Mark 15 Phalanx CIWS. The sensor suite includes two Kelvin Hughes Type 100G navigation radars. Ship's company was made up of 25 officers and 212 sailors.

=== Ships in class ===
Royal Australian Navy
Pennant no.	Name	Builder	Laid down	Launched	Commissioned	Status
OR 304	HMAS Success	Cockatoo Docks & Engineering Company, Sydney, Australia	9 August 1980	3 March 1984	19 February 1986	Decommissioned 2019

== Argentine Navy ==
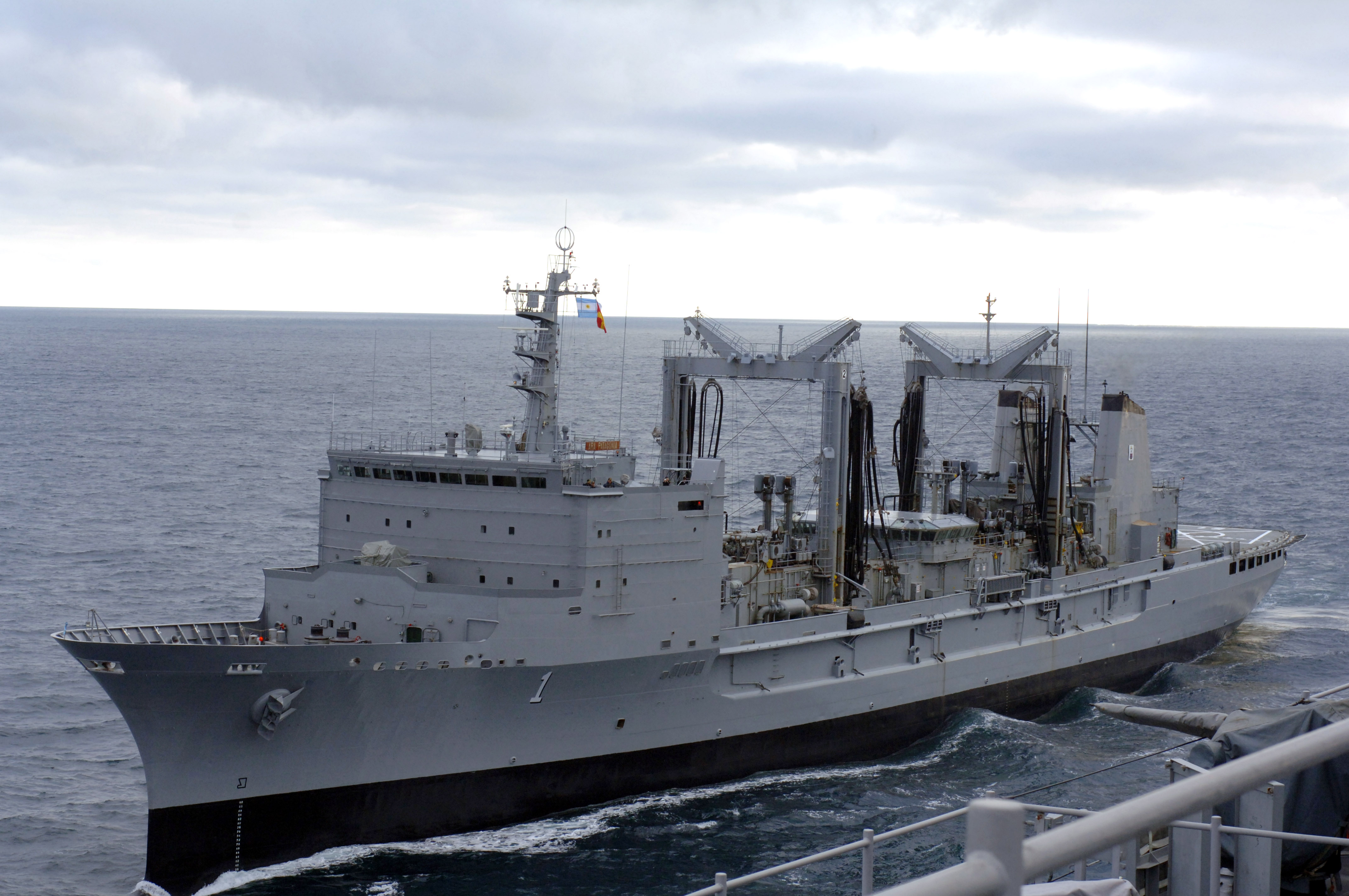
ARA Patagonia during naval exercises

On 12 July 1999, Argentina acquired Durance from the French Navy (originally commissioned into French service in 1976) and renamed the ship ARA Patagonia. The ship underwent a refit and has capacity for 9,100 t (9,000 long tons) of fuel oil, 500 t of aviation fuel, 140 t of distilled water, 170 t of provisions, 150 t of munitions and 50 t of spare parts. The ship mounts only two Bofors 40 mm/60 guns and four 12.7 mm machine guns. The ship uses an Alouette III helicopter. The ship entered Argentine Navy service in July 2000. The ship was reported non-operational in 2020. In October 2022, it was reported that the Argentine defence ministry had allocated funding for a refit of the ship to be carried out at the Puerto Belgrano Naval Arsenal in collaboration with the Tandanor shipyard. The ship was reported to have entered dry dock in early 2023. Work on the ship, involving general maintenance and repair, was reported to have been completed in June 2023.

=== Ships in class ===
Argentine Navy
Pennant no.	Name	Builder	Laid down	Launched	Commissioned	Status
B-1	ARA Patagonia	Arsenal de Brest, Brest, France	10 December 1973	6 September 1975	July 2000 (in Argentine service)	Active

== Royal Saudi Navy ==
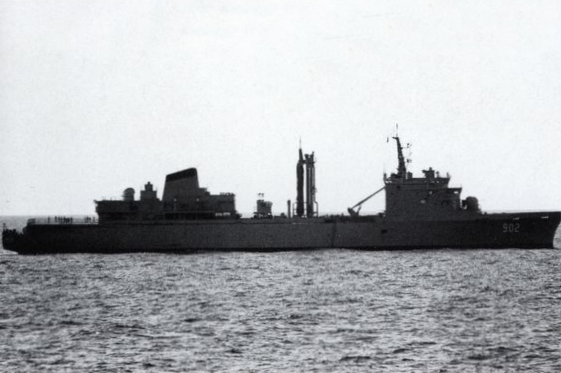
Boraida underway in the Red Sea in 1991

In October 1980, Saudi Arabia signed a contract for two replenishment oilers as part of the Sawari I programme. The Boraida class have a full load displacement of 11,400 t (11,200 long tons), are 135 m (442 ft 11 in) long, have a beam of 18.7 m (61 ft 4 in), and a draught of 7 m (23 ft 0 in). They use two 18,200 horsepower (13,600 kW) SEMT Pielstick 14 PC2.5 V 500 diesel engines driving two shafts. They have a top speed of 20.5 knots (38.0 km/h; 23.6 mph) and a range of 7,000 nmi (13,000 km; 8,100 mi) at 15 knots. They have a complement of 140. The ship can carry 4,350 tonnes (4,280 long tons; 4,800 short tons) of diesel, 35 tonnes (34 long tons; 39 short tons) of aviation fuel, 140 tonnes (140 long tons; 150 short tons) of freshwater, 100 tonnes (98 long tons; 110 short tons) of ammo, and 100 tonnes (98 long tons; 110 short tons) of supplies. The ship is armed by four Breda Bofors 40 mm/70 guns in two twin mounts. They have two CSEE Naja optronic fire control directors for the 40 mm guns. They have an aft helicopter deck, and can carry either two Eurocopter AS365 Dauphin or one Eurocopter AS332 Super Puma helicopters. Both ships underwent upgrades in 1996–1998. They serve as training ships and depot and maintenance ships.

Boraida class
Pennant no.	Name	Builder	Laid down	Launched	Commissioned	Status
902	Boraida	La Ciotat, Marseille, France	13 April 1982	22 January 1983	29 February 1984	In service
904	Yunbou	La Ciotat, Marseille, France	9 October 1983	20 October 1984	29 August 1985	In service
