= Bâtiment ravitailleur de forces =

Class of French warships

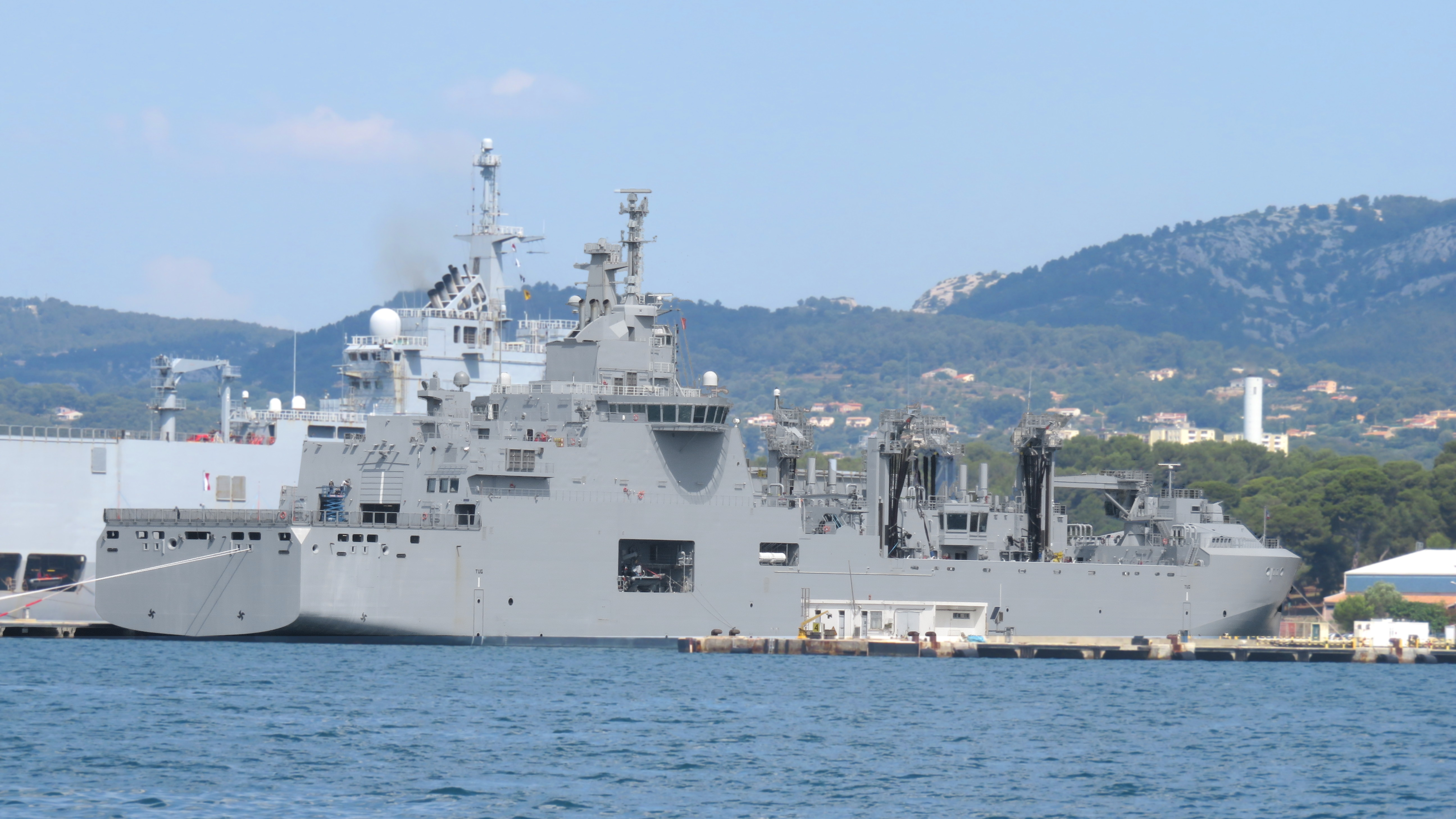
- Jacques Chevallier, lead ship of the class

Class overview
- Name: Jacques Chevallier class
- Builders: Chantiers de l'Atlantique, Fincantieri
- Operators: French Navy
- Preceded by: Durance-class tanker
- In commission: From 2024
- Planned: 4
- Building: 1
- Completed: 2
- Active: 2

General characteristics
- Type: Replenishment ship
- Displacement: 31,000 t (full load)
- Length: 194 m (636 ft 6 in)
- Beam: 27.4 m (89 ft 11 in)
- Draught: 9 m (29 ft 6 in)
- Speed: 20 knots (37 km/h; 23 mph); 10 knots (19 km/h; 12 mph) on electric engines
- Range: 7,000 nmi (13,000 km; 8,100 mi) at 16 knots (30 km/h; 18 mph)
- Endurance: 30 days
- Armament: 2 × twin Simbad-RC/Mistral Mk3 SAM/SSM; 2 × Thales/Nexter 40 mm RAPIDFire guns

The bâtiments ravitailleurs de forces, or BRF, are a class of fleet tankers replacing the Durance-class units in French Navy service. Until January 2019, the programme was known as Flotte logistique (abbreviated FLOTLOG in military parlance). First ship of the class was delivered to the French Navy in July 2023 and formally entered service in November 2024. The ships are part of the Vulcano-class logistic support ship programme.

== History ==
Replacement for the Durance type has been considered by the French Navy since 2009, with the military procurement law for years 2009–2014. At the time, the concept was knows as "flotte logistique" ("logistical fleet", or FLOTLOG). The succession was envisioned to take place between 2017 and 2020. The replacement was motivated both by the age of the Durance hulls, and by their non-conformity with current safety standards, notably the lack of a double hull. From 2010, Naval Group (then still named DCNS) proposed a project named BRAVE. This project was carried over to the following procurement law (2014 to 2019), delaying the order of the first unit to 2019. However, after STX France was purchased by Fincantieri, the project by Naval Group was abandoned and it was decided to base the new concept on the Italian fleet tanker Vulcano, then being built by Fincantieri for the Italian Navy. The FLOTLOG programme was further confirmed in the new military procurement law.

On 30 January 2019, OCCAR ordered four units from Chantiers de l'Atlantique and Naval Group for the French Navy. The first two ships of the class are based at Toulon. They will be joined by the fourth ship of the class (Gustave Zédé) in the early 2030s, while the third ship of the class (Émile Bertin) will be based at Brest from about 2027/28.

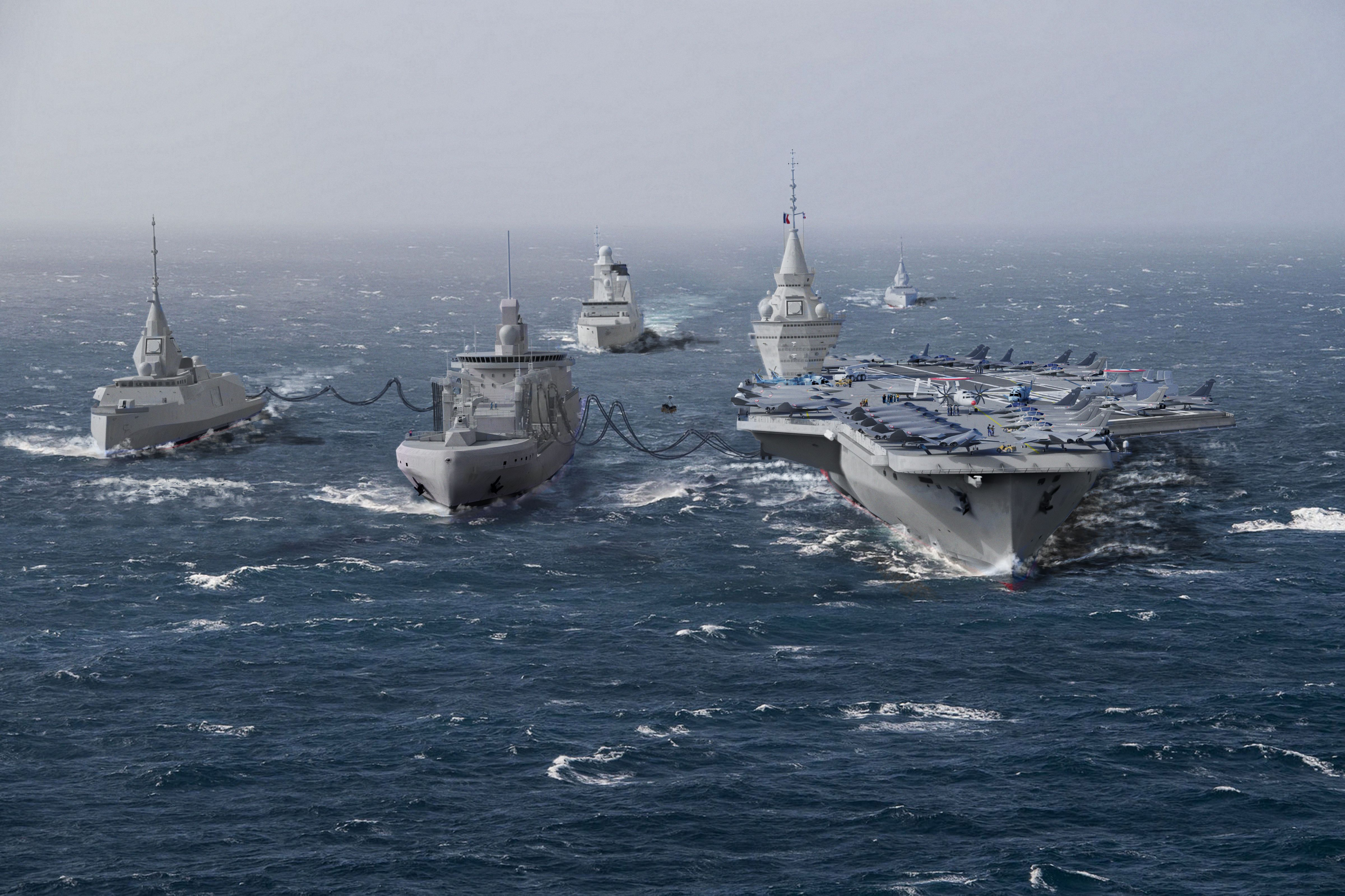
The Bâtiment ravitailleur de forces in planned French Navy of the late 2030s, conducting simultaneous underway replenishment with the Future French aircraft carrier (PA-Ng) nuclear aircraft carrier and with a Frégate de défense et d'intervention

== Construction ==
The four units of the class are to be constructed in Saint-Nazaire, at Chantiers de l'Atlantique. The first ship was initially planned for delivery in 2022. However, that delivery date subsequently slipped by one year, to 2023. Two additional ships are scheduled for delivery in 2025 and 2027. In 2023, it was decided that a fourth ship of the class was to be delayed beyond 2030.

Steel cutting for the first ship took place on 18 May 2020. A floating hull section was built at Fincantieri, Italy. The ship was launched in April 2022 and named Jacques Chevallier. Sea trials began on 20 December 2022. She was formally delivered to the French Navy on 18 July 2023 to continue her sea trials. On 29 March, she carried out her first underway replenishment for the aircraft carrier Charles de Gaulle, having refueled the air defence frigate Chevalier Paul a few days earlier.

These ships are among the largest units of the French Navy, second only to Charles de Gaulle.

== Description ==
The ships have a length of 194 metres (636 ft 6 in), a beam of 27.4 m (89 ft 11 in) and a draught of 9 m (29 ft 6 in). They have a displacement of 16,000 t (16,000 long tons) empty and 31,000 t (31,000 long tons) at full load. They are powered by diesel-electric propulsion and have a crew of 130 with accommodations for up to 60 passengers. The vessels have capacity for 13,000 m^{3} (3,400,000 US gal) of fuel.

Up to four ships are scheduled to be commissioned in the French Navy as replacement for the Durance-class tankers. On 18 May 2020, the navy published the names intended for the ships, which honour preeminent French naval engineers: Jacques Chevallier, Jacques Stosskopf, Louis-Émile Bertin and Gustave Zédé.

Defensive weapons include the Simbad-RC system firing Mistral Mk3 surface-to-air missiles and two 40CT cannon. The first guns of the type were installed on Jacques Chevallier in February 2023. In March it was confirmed that two Simbad-RC short-range SAM/SSM systems had been installed on the ship, on a platform located behind the bridge. This was said to represent the first deployment of the Simbad-RC system variant with the French Navy.

== Ships of the class ==
Dates in italics constitute estimates

No.	Name	Laid down	Launch	Delivery	Commissioning	Notes
A725	Jacques Chevallier	24 December 2021	29 April 2022	18 July 2023	20 November 2024	First steel cut 18 May 2020; forward part of the hull built at Fincantieri, Castellammare di Stabia;
A726	Jacques Stosskopf	6 December 2022	19 August 2024	November 2025	18 May 2026	First steel cut, February 2022.
A...	Émile Bertin	8 August 2024	3 April 2026	2027		Fitting out; first steel cut December 2023
A...	Gustave Zédé			2032		Delayed beyond 2030

== Operations ==
In early October 2023, and still prior to her commissioning, Jacques Chevallier embarked on her first operational deployment into the Atlantic and Indian Oceans. The ship was expected to deploy for three months and return to Toulon by the end of the year. She ended up deploying for four months, returning to Toulon in early February 2024.

In early 2026 and prior to her commissioning, Jacques Stosskopf began her own long-term deployment to the Far North, the West Indies and the Pacific. She formally entered service in May 2026.

In May 2026, Jacques Chevallier was accompanying the aircraft carrier Charles de Gaulle, and other French vessels, operating in the Indian Ocean in response to the American/Israeli War with Iran.

== See also ==
- Future of the French Navy
