= Naval Action Force =

Surface branch of the French Navy

Naval Action Force Force d'action navale
- Active: 1992 - present
- Country: France
- Branch: French Navy
- Type: Surface warship force
- Garrison/HQ: Toulon

The Force d'action navale (FAN, Naval Action Force) is the 10,500-man and nearly 100-ship force of surface warships of the French Navy. As of August 2023, it is commanded by Admiral Nicolas Vaujour.

The ships are divided into seven categories:

- The aeronaval group, which has the aircraft carrier Charles de Gaulle at its core
- The amphibious group, directed by "Projection and Command vessels" (currently ships of the Mistral class)
- Frigates, which act either as protection for the strategic groups, or alone in monitoring, survey, presence, rescue or deterrence missions
- Minesweepers
- "Sovereignty" ships, which are deployed overseas and act as presence and prevention forces
- Support vessels
- Public service ships, hydrographic and oceanographic vessels

== The aeronaval group ==
The aeronaval group is the main French Navy power projection force. It is also one of the components of the nuclear deterrence forces, since the embarked Rafale planes have nuclear capabilities.

At minimum, it contains a single aircraft carrier, Charles de Gaulle, an anti-air frigate, and a support vessel. Typically, this group also includes several anti-air and anti-submarine frigates, nuclear attack submarines (Rubis-class submarines or Barracuda-class submarines), and possibly additional support ships.

The carrier air group can include up to 40 aircraft: Rafale, Super Étendard and E-2 Hawkeye planes; NH90 Caïman Marine, AS365 Dauphin and AS565 Panther helicopters. This composition varies according to the mission and the tactical environment, and can include aircraft of the ALAT (Army) or the Armée de l'Air (Air Force).

Like any naval force, the aeronaval group can be assisted by land-based Breguet Atlantique aircraft.

The aircraft carrier Clemenceau formed the core of the French Navy's battle force for many years.

One of the aeronaval group's deployments was to take part in the initial attacks on Al-Qaeda and the Taliban in Afghanistan as part of what became the War in Afghanistan, in response to the September 11 attacks. The group, designated Task Force 473 for the operation, comprised 2,900 men under the command of Contre-Amiral François Cluzel and sailed in December 2001. It consisted of the nuclear aircraft carrier Charles De Gaulle, frigates La Motte-Picquet, Jean de Vienne, Jean Bart, the nuclear attack submarine Rubis, the tanker Meuse, and theD'Estienne d'Orves-class aviso Commandant Ducuing. The Indian Ocean region deployment lasted for seven months before the group returned to France in mid-2002.

The number 473 seems to be semi-permanently assigned to Charles de Gaulle and its task group, being used again during Operation Agapanthe in 2004.

During the 2011 Libyan civil war, the French carrier battle group commanded from Charles de Gaulle was designated Task Force 473 and was under the command of Vice-Admiral Phillippe Coindreau. Coindreau was promoted to contre-amiral in September 2009, and he was named deputy commandant of the aéro-maritime force of rapid réaction at Toulon. In English-language reports, he was described as deputy commander of the High Readiness Force Maritime Headquarters.

On 29 December 2013, Task Force 473, led by the aircraft carrier Charles de Gaulle, and comprising the destroyer Forbin, frigate Jean de Vienne, and the replenishment oiler Meuse met Carrier Strike Group Ten for an exercise in the Gulf of Oman. Carrier Strike Group Ten comprises the aircraft carrier USS Harry S. Truman, guided-missile cruisers USS Gettysburg and USS San Jacinto and guided-missile destroyers USS Bulkeley, USS Carney, USS Hopper, and USS Mason.

In November 2015, Task Force 473 sailed again to strike Islamic State targets in Syria and Iraq. The composition of the task force is French, however, the British destroyer HMS Defender and a frigate from the Belgian Navy, Leopold I, sailed as part of the group.

== The amphibious group ==
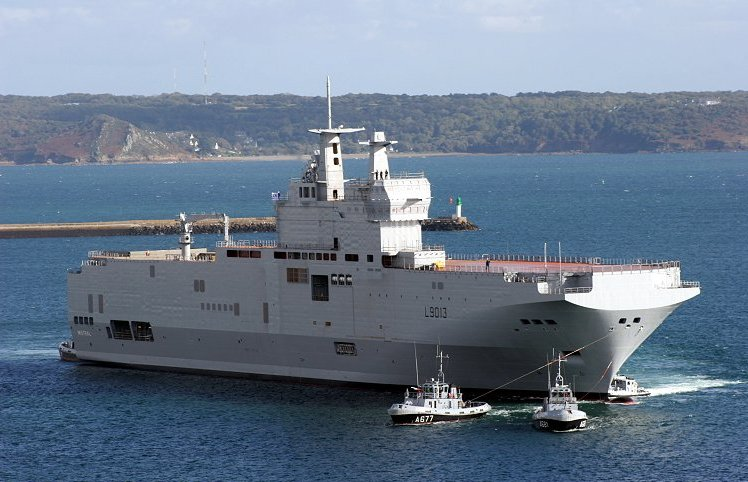
Mistral-class landing platform assault Tonnerre

The French Navy operates three large amphibious ships (Mistral-class amphibious assault ships), which contain smaller landing craft. Aboard are helicopters, troops, and land vehicles.

The force also operates smaller landing craft which are either carried on board the Mistral-class ships or based in overseas territories. 14 EDA-S Amphibious Standard Landing Craft (Engins de Débarquement Amphibie – Standards) are being introduced to replace CTM landing craft previously carried on the Mistral-class helicopter assault ships and to restore a light amphibious transport capability to French naval forces protecting certain of its overseas territories (Mayotte, New Caledonia, Martinique and French Guiana) and for operations around Djibouti. Deliveries of these landing craft were initiated in 2021 and will continue up to 2026.

The amphibious groups include one or several landing craft (EDAR and CTM) which allow the projection of inter-arm groups with troops, vehicles and helicopters. They can carry Puma, Cougar and NH-90 Caïman Marine transport helicopters or Gazelle and Tigre combat helicopters, the Commandos Marine, minesweeping units, or Army units.

Commander French Maritime Forces (COMFRMARFOR) advises ALFAN, the Admiral in command of the Naval Action Force, and when operational at sea commands from the TCDs.

== Destroyers and frigates ==
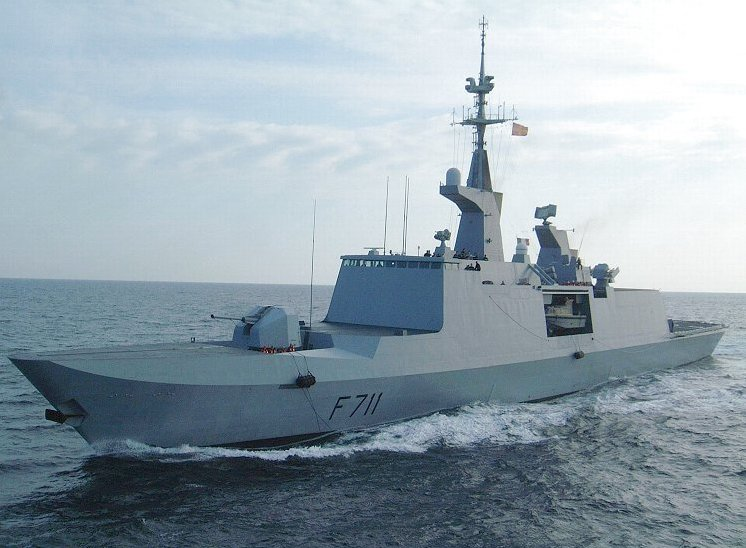
La Fayette-class frigate

The destroyers and frigates are the backbone of the French surface fleet. The French Navy does not officially use the term "destroyer" but rather classifies these vessels as "first-rate frigates". Nevertheless, they are identified with the NATO "D" designation which ranks them in the destroyer class, instead of ranking them with an "F" designation as frigates. As of 2023, all French warships are having their hull numbers removed in order to reduce the ability to identify individual ships.

Destroyers/frigates secure aero-naval space and allow free action to the other components of the Navy. They are specialised according to the threat, typically escorting other forces (aeronaval or amphibious groups, submarines or civil ships). As of 2024-25 the principal surface combatants of the force consisted of:

- The four anti-air destroyers/frigates: Two Horizon and two Aquitaine air defence variant of the FREMM-class of frigate are designed to protect the aeronaval group against air threats. The final two of a total of eight Aquitaine-class frigates are built with enhanced air defence capabilities but drop the land-attack capabilities of the ASW variants. Nevertheless, they retain the ASW sensors and capabilities of this class of vessel.
- The six anti-submarine (ASW) variant destroyers/frigates of the Aquitaine (FREMM) class: They carry both hull-mounted and towed sonars and NH-90 Caïman Marine or Eurocopter AS565 Panther helicopters, and have anti-ship, land-attack and anti-air capabilities.
- One frigate of the new Amiral Ronarc'h class intermediate-size frigates (first ship on sea trials with additional vessels under construction): These vessels also carry hull-mounted and towed sonars as well as anti-submarine helicopters. Additionally they incorporate an air defence capability as well as anti-ship missiles.
- The five La Fayette-class frigates are used primarily as presence ships, to patrol national and international waters, and to take part in operations outside of Europe. They can therefore act in cooperation with international intervention, protection, special operation or humanitarian missions. They carry AS565 Panther helicopters.
- The six Floréal-class frigates are used primarily for patrolling the territorial waters of France's overseas territories. While the ships themselves do not carry anti-submarine sensors, they are able to carry a single AS565 Panther for anti-submarine warfare if required and available.

== Minesweepers ==
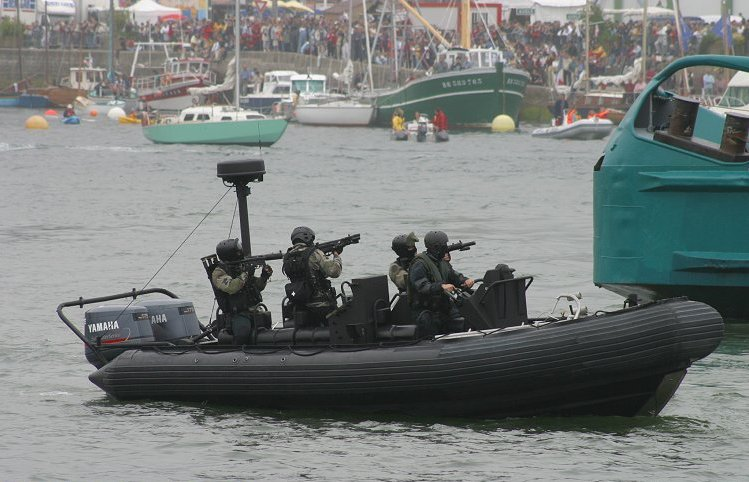
Commandos de Marine

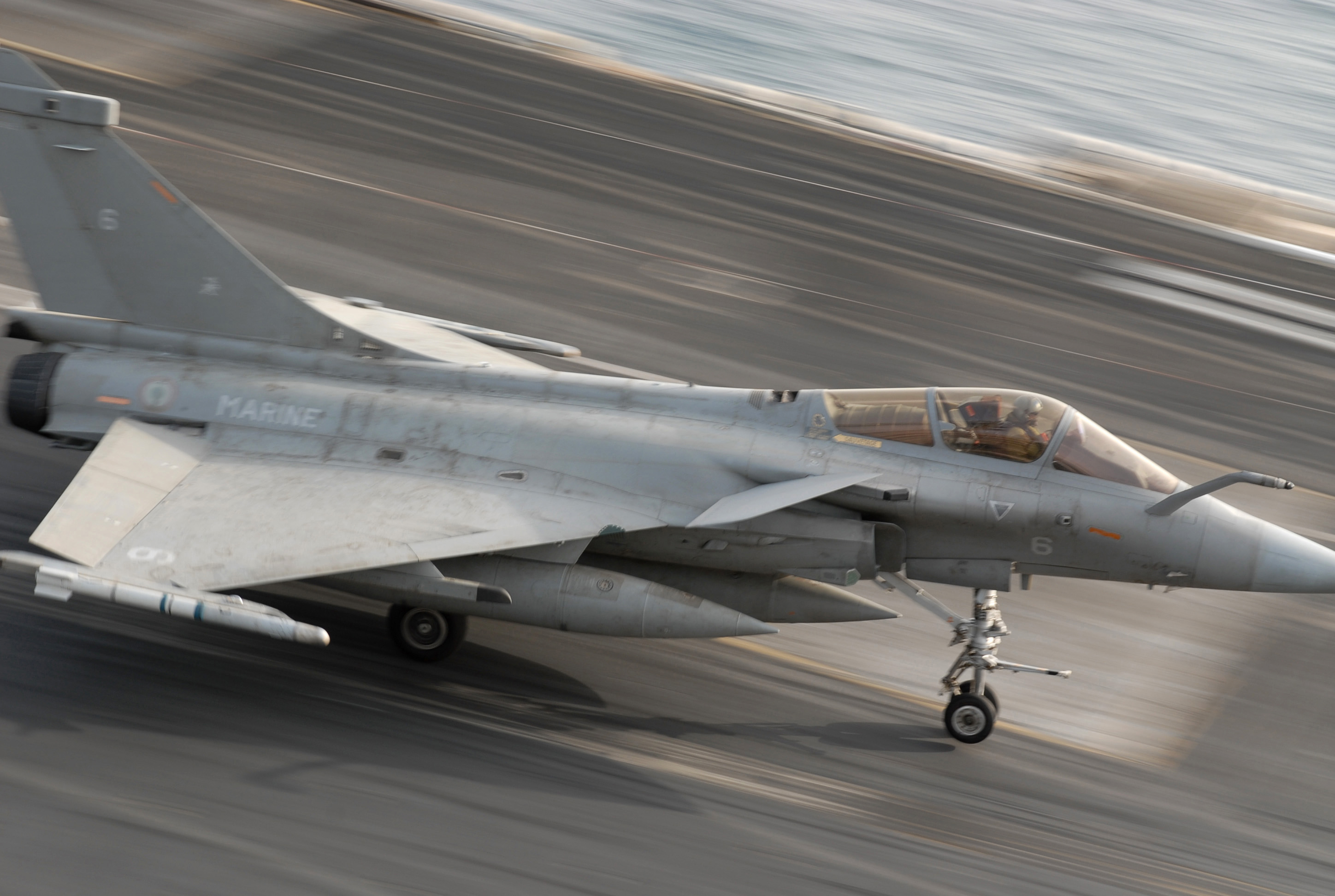
Dassault Rafale fighter aircraft

The minesweepers secure major French harbours, especially for the ballistic missile submarines (Strategic Oceanic Force) in Brest, and the attack submarines in Toulon. They also stay available to secure access to Toulon, Marseille, any of the harbours of the Atlantic coast, and any Allied harbour simultaneously.

They are designed to be used within a larger group, interallied or international, in case of mine risks near coasts.

In peacetime, these units can bring help and assistance to civilian ships, or search wrecks.

This force includes 1,100 men and:

- 9 minehunters
- 3 minesweeping diver groups for shallow waters.
- Several sonar ships which secure the area around Brest harbour
- One command and support ship

== Sovereignty vessels ==
These 65 vessels (as of 2019) patrol harbors, territorial waters, and the world's largest exclusive economic zone (EEZ), including enforcing fishing, environmental, and criminal laws, and conducting or supporting recovery operations.

Six Floréal-class frigates perform sovereignty tasks, mainly by controlling the large French EEZ, carrying out police action, and monitoring fishing activities. They operate in low-risk environments. All six are based overseas (two at Réunion, two at Martinique, one in French Polynesia, and one in New Caledonia).

The A-69 avisos were originally designed to counter conventional submarines, especially in coastal defence. Instead of decommissioning all 17 as planned, by 2011, nine were stripped of heavy weaponry and converted to offshore patrol vessel (Patrouilleur de haute-mer or PHM). While based in metropolitan France, they conduct routine deployments to the Gulf of Guinea, the Indian Ocean, the Caribbean Sea, and the Pacific Ocean, replacing eight of the original P400-class OPVs. As of mid-2026, only one of the PHMs remains in service, with replacements (the “Patrouilleurs Hauturiers” - PH) being designed to enter service from 2028 and operate primarily in the waters of Metropolitan France.

Prior to 2011, ten P400-class OPVs operated in pairs at Réunion, Martinique, French Guiana, French Polynesia, and New Caledonia. All have been retired as of 2023. They are being replaced in the waters of France's overseas territories in the Pacific and Indian Ocean by a new class of vessel, the Patrouilleur Outre-mer (POM class) which is entering service between 2023 and 2027.

Three vessels: Flamant, Cormoran, and Pluvier fill similar roles of patrolling beyond territorial waters out of metropolitan France. They are to be replaced in these roles in the 2030s by the PH-class vessels.

Three Patrouilleur Antilles Guyane (PAG), are based in French Guiana and Martinique replacing the former P 400s.

There are also two unique patrol vessels (Le Malin at Réunion and Fulmar for Saint Pierre and Miquelon) which are ex-trawlers fulfilling patrol missions in their respective areas. Le Malin will be replaced by a POM-class vessel in 2027, while an additional POM-class ships are to further reinforce the French naval presence in the Indian Ocean and the Pacific.

The patrol boats of the Gendarmerie Maritime carry out law enforcement operations primarily in ports and coastal waters. These include six 32-metre (105 ft) coastal patrol boats (Patrouilleur côtier de Gendarmerie maritime or PCGM), based in Cherbourg (2), Lorient, Toulon, Guadeloupe, and French Polynesia. There are twenty-four 20-metre (66 ft) coastal surveillance launches (vedette côtière de surveillance maritime), nineteen deployed around metropolitan France and five deployed overseas, generally responding to both maritime and departmental prefects for law enforcement in coastal waters. Eight 12-metre (39 ft) launches (vedette de sûreté maritime et portuaire), are located in Le Havre, Cherbourg, Brest, Marseille, and Toulon.

Four overseas support and assistance vessels (bâtiments de soutien et d'assistance outre-mer) of the D'Entrecasteaux class have been constructed and deployed to New Caledonia, French Polynesia, Réunion, and Martinique.

Four home support and assistance vessels (bâtiments de soutien et d'assistance métropolitains) of the Loire class have been constructed and deployed to Brest and Toulon (with two in each port).

== Support ships ==
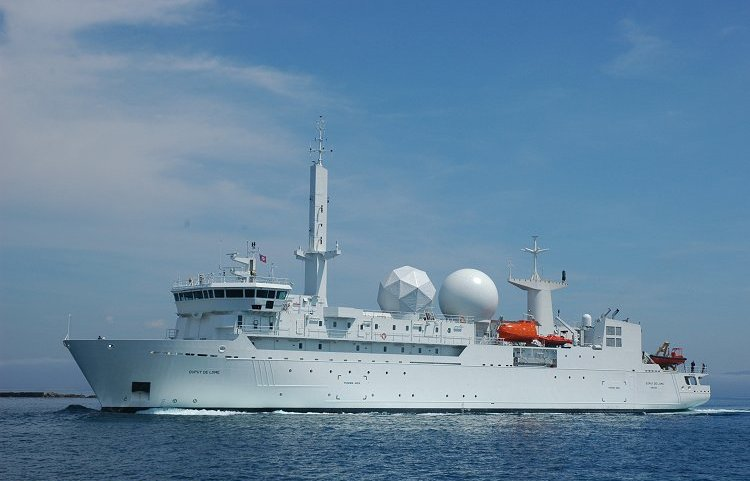
Dupuy de Lôme

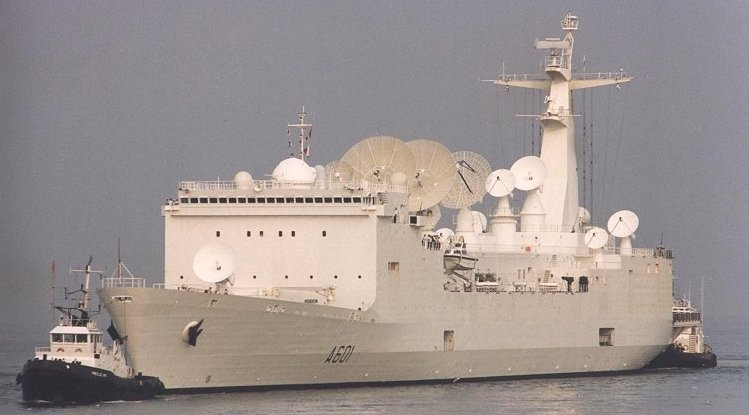
Monge

The support ships allow the French naval forces to be present anywhere on the planet, regardless of the remoteness of their bases. These ships operate independently or are integrated into tactical groups. They shuttle between harbours and fleets, giving them months of operational capabilities by feeding fuel, ammunition, food, water, spare parts and mail. A class of up to four new underway support ships, the Jacques Chevallier-class, began service entry in 2023/24.

There is also one permanent mechanics ship, Jules Verne, which can repair other ships. The spy ship Dupuy de Lôme is used for intelligence gathering and the tracking ship Monge is used to develop new weapon systems, especially those related to nuclear deterrence.

== Hydrographic and oceanographic vessels ==
One hydro-oceanographic and three hydrographic ships help carrying out mapping and research operations, as well as gathering intelligence which could prove useful to the deployment of naval forces and their weapon systems. They are operated by the service hydrographique et océanographique de la marine (SHOM).

== See also ==
- List of active French Navy ships
