= French ship Chevalier Paul =

Three vessels of the French Navy have borne the name Chevalier Paul ("Knight Paul") in honour of Paul de Fortia, Chevalier Paul.

- French destroyer Chevalier Paul (1932) (1934–1941), a Vauquelin-class destroyer
- French destroyer Chevalier Paul (D626) (1956–1971), a T 47-class destroyer
- French frigate Chevalier Paul (D621), a Horizon-class frigate
