= French frigate Chevalier Paul =

Horizon-class frigate of the French Navy

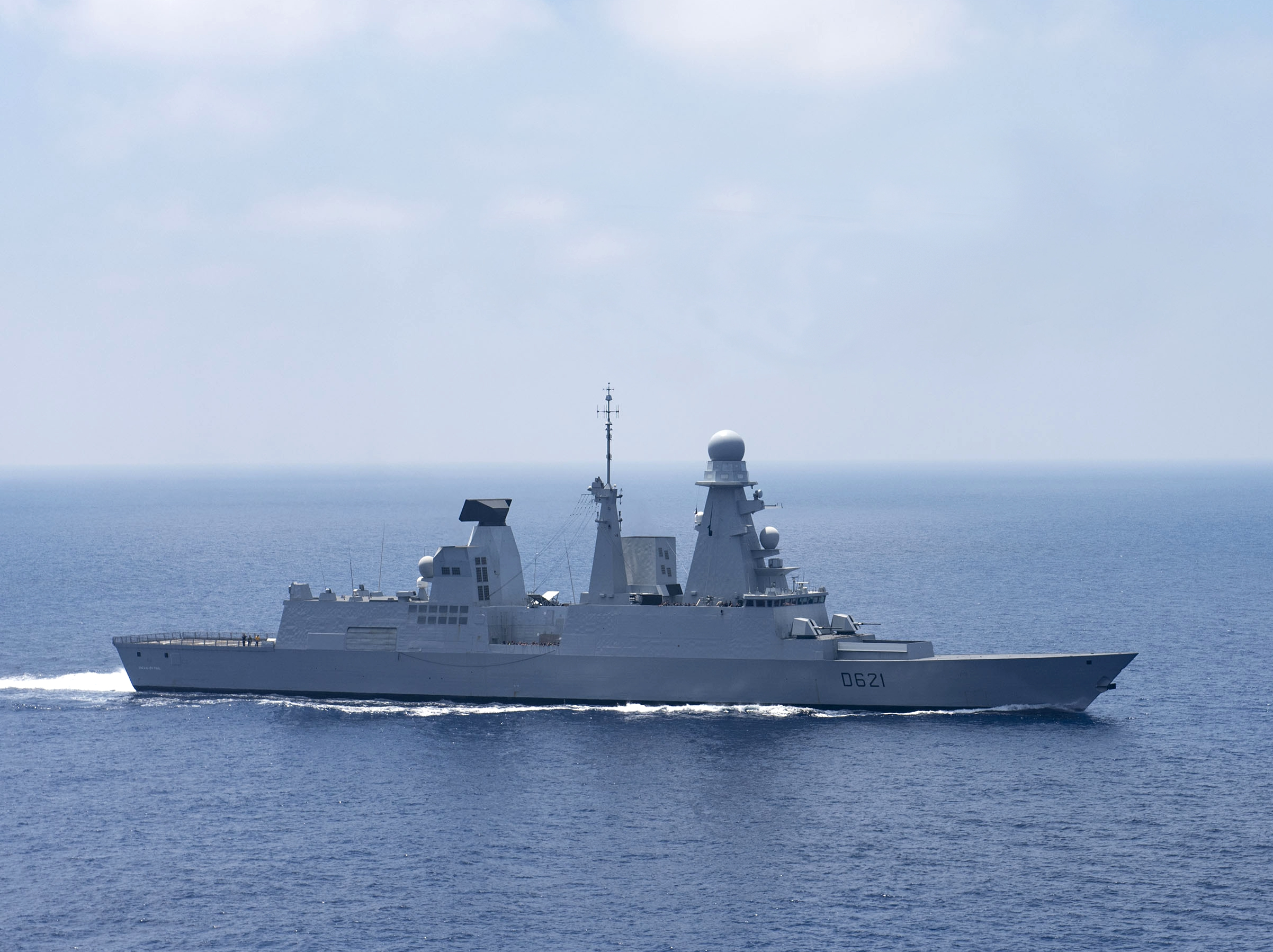
- Chevalier Paul underway in the Mediterranean Sea on 15 July 2017

History

France
- Name: Chevalier Paul
- Namesake: Chevalier Paul
- Ordered: 27 October 2000
- Builder: DCNS and Thales Group. Lorient shipyard
- Laid down: 13 January 2005
- Launched: 12 July 2006
- Commissioned: June 2009
- Home port: Toulon
- Identification: Pennant number: D 621; MMSI number: 228722000
- Status: Active

General characteristics
- Class & type: Horizon-class frigate
- Displacement: 7,050 tonnes
- Length: 152.87 m (501 ft 7 in)
- Beam: 20.3 m (66 ft 7 in)
- Draught: 5.4 m (17 ft 9 in)
- Propulsion: 2 × 31280 HP GE/Avio LM2500 gas turbines; 2 × 5875 HP SEMT Pielstick 12 PA6 STC diesels; 1 × beam propeller; 2 × 4-blade propellers
- Speed: 29 knots (54 km/h; 33 mph) (18 on diesel)
- Range: 7,000 nmi (13,000 km; 8,100 mi) at 18 knots (33 km/h; 21 mph)s, 3500 nmi at 25 knots
- Boats & landing craft carried: EDO, 20-seat EFRC, Hurricane 733
- Capacity: 32 passengers or admiral staff
- Complement: 26 officers; 110 petty officers; 38 sailors
- Sensors & processing systems: S-1850 LRR tri-dimensional sentry radar with IFF; ABF TUS 4110 CL hull sonar; Tugged linear antenna with Alto torpedo detector
- Electronic warfare & decoys: Radar jammer; Communication jammer; NGDS system (2 decoy launchers, REM, RIR, LAD); Contralto system (2 acoustic decoy launchers).
- Armament: Anti-air; 1 × PAAMS (48 × Aster 15 or 30 anti-air missiles in SYLVER A50 VLS.); For but not with: [1 × Sadral launcher with 6 Mistral missiles] space on starboard roof of hangar; Anti-ship; 8 × Exocet MM40 Block 3 anti-ship missiles (Block 3c variant entering service with the French Navy from December 2022); Anti-submarine; 2 × MU90 torpedo tubes; Guns; 2 × Otobreda 76 mm super rapid guns; 3 × Narwhal 20 mm remote-controlled naval gun
- Aircraft carried: 1 × NH90 helicopter

Chevalier Paul is a Horizon-class frigate of the French Marine Nationale commissioned in June 2009, the third vessel of the French Navy named after the 17th century admiral Chevalier Paul. The main mission of this type of ship is the escort and protection of a carrier strike group formed around an aircraft carrier, usually Charles de Gaulle or one of the aircraft carriers of the US Navy, or an amphibious operation carried out by amphibious helicopter carriers. The ship's specialty is air traffic control in a war zone, but it can be employed in a wide variety of missions, such as intelligence-gathering, special forces operations, or in protecting less well-armed vessels. Horizon-class frigates such as Chevalier Paul are the most powerful surface combatants that France has ever built. In service since the end of 2011, it bears the pennant number D621. Its namesake is Jean-Paul de Saumeur, better known as Chevalier Paul, a French naval officer born in Marseille in 1598.

Nantes is the godmother city of Chevalier Paul since 17 March 2012.

== Design and description ==
=== Aster missile ===
Aster missiles are the main weapon system of Chevalier Paul. The ship is equipped with 32 Aster 30 missiles and 16 Aster 15 missiles, housed in vertical silos of the Sylver A50 type, located on the foredeck. A main anti-air missile system (PAAMS), combined with an EMPAR multifunction radar operating in C-band, controls launch and target tracking.

The first launch of an Aster 30 against a target from sister ship Forbin took place in November 2008 at Toulon. It was the first fire of this machine since a frigate. The previous Aster 30 launches from the sea were carried out from a British barge and the Italian test ship Carabiniere. The missile was fired at an aerial target from the evolving building off the DGA's Le Levant test and launch center . The Aster 30 missiles of the air defense frigate are the second bulwark of protection of the carrier strike group, after the Rafale fighters, and provide 360° protection at a distance of 100 kilometers against aircraft and 30 kilometers against grazing and maneuvering anti-ship anti-ship missiles in service or in development. The French Navy has shown with the frigate Forbin its capacity to destroy a supersonic missile ( 3,000 km / h ) maneuvering ( SS-N-22, AS-17, BrahMos ) and at an altitude of less than 5 meters above water by shooting down a GQM-163 Coyote.

=== Exocet MM40 Block 3C ===
Chevalier Paul embarks eight sea-sea Exocet missiles installed on the upper deck amidships. The most recent version MM40 Block 3C of the Exocet missile was selected. It can operate at a distance of more than 180 kilometers from its objective.

=== Others ===
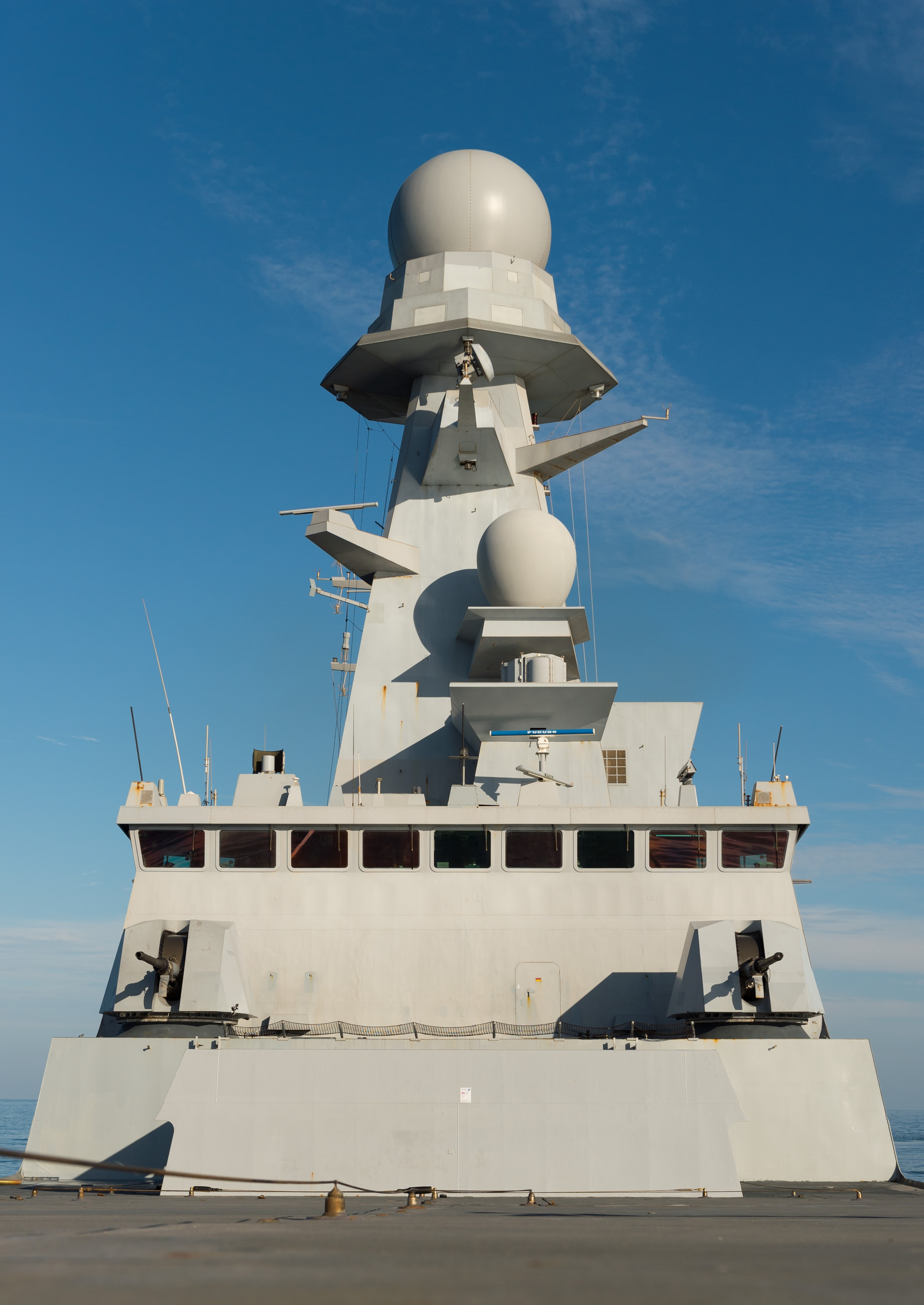
Twin OTO Melara 76 mm turrets on Chevalier Paul

Two turrets with fully automated OTO-Melara 76 mm cannon, controlled from Central Operations, with a rate of fire of 60 to 120 rounds per minute. Each turret, weighing 5.5 tonnes, is gyro-stabilized, in order to maintain the point-of-aim, despite the movements of the ship. It has a magazine containing 60 shells which can be refilled in real time by crew members moving ammunition from the main ammunition compartment via an elevator. More than 1,000 shells of different types (land, surface, or anti-aircraft) are stored, with a maximum range of 13 kilometers against surface targets, and 2 manual guns of 20 mm mod. replaced in 2018 by 3 Narwhal 20 mm automatic cannons.

== Service history ==
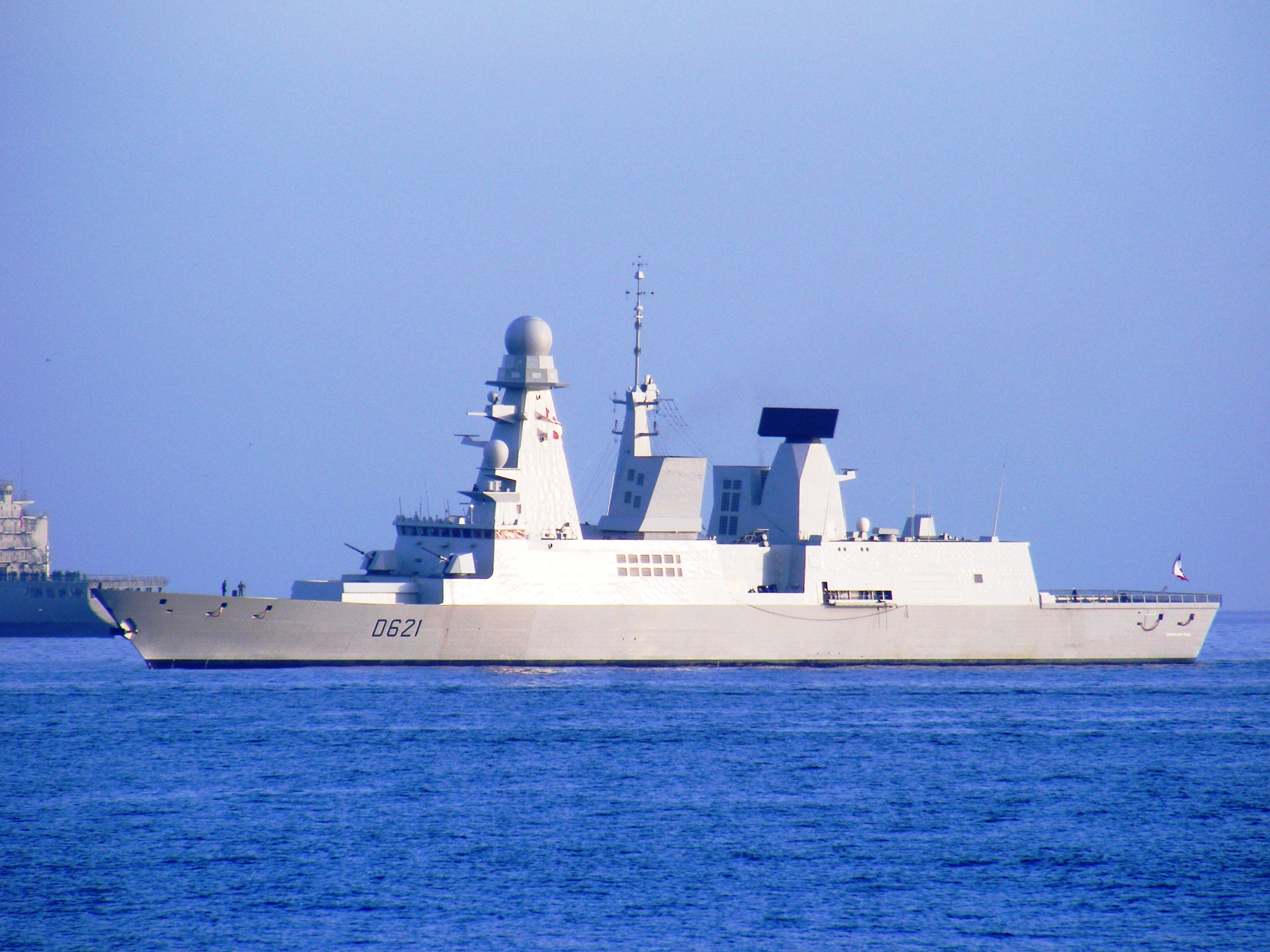
Chevalier Paul at Valparaíso

Chevalier Paul was launched by DCN at Lorient on 12 July 2006. She is a sister ship to Forbin. Chevalier Paul's first trip to the sea took place in November 2007. Two years later, the Navy accepted the ship into service. This ship was approved by the French Navy in December 2008 and is based in the military port of Toulon. On 5 May 2009, the four Horizon-class frigates of the French and Italian navies met off La Spezia, Italy. Chevalier Paul remained moored there until 7 May in the evening.

The ship made the first launch of an MM40 Block 3 missile by a French Navy ship on 17 March 2010. It made its first long-term crossing from 18 March 2010, which ended in mid-July/ Chevalier Paul sailed to the North Sea and briefly participated in the NATO exercise Brillant Mariner (12 to 22 April 2011), which also involves the aircraft carrier Charles de Gaulle and Mistral. Then the frigate crossed the Atlantic to reach the United States and Canada, before sailing south to the Caribbean, stopping over in Mexico and crossing the Panama Canal. She then began a tour of South America and arrived in Rio de Janeiro in June 2011. Chevalier Paul then re-crossed the Atlantic to reach Morocco and in mid-July, returned to the naval base of Toulon. Chevalier Paul was admitted to active service on 10 June 2011, when the ship was engaged three days later in Operation Harmattan, the French contribution to the 2011 military intervention in Libya.

On 29 August 2013, Chevalier Paul left Toulon. Some reports claimed she had been deployed to the eastern Mediterranean in response to the Syrian Civil War, but the navy authorities declined to confirm she was heading for Syria. From 13 to 26 October 2014, the frigate took part in the large international operational exercise Catamaran 2014 that practiced an amphibious assault. In November 2015, a French Navy press release stated that Chevalier Paul was to be part of the Charles de Gaulle task force launching strikes against the Islamic State of Iraq and the Levant. The ship was a component of the Charles de Gaulle Carrier Strike Group, which left Toulon on 13 January for a mission of approximately five months and engaged for eight weeks in the Persian Gulf.

On 18 November 2015, Charles de Gaulle set sail and joined its carrier strike group, of which Chevalier Paul is a member. It also consisted of the French frigate La Motte-Picquet, the Belgian frigate Leopold I , the British destroyer HMS Defender, the supply ship Marne, and a nuclear attack submarine.

On 6 July 2016, following Operation Arromanches 2 in the eastern Mediterranean, the frigate received the Belgian military cross.

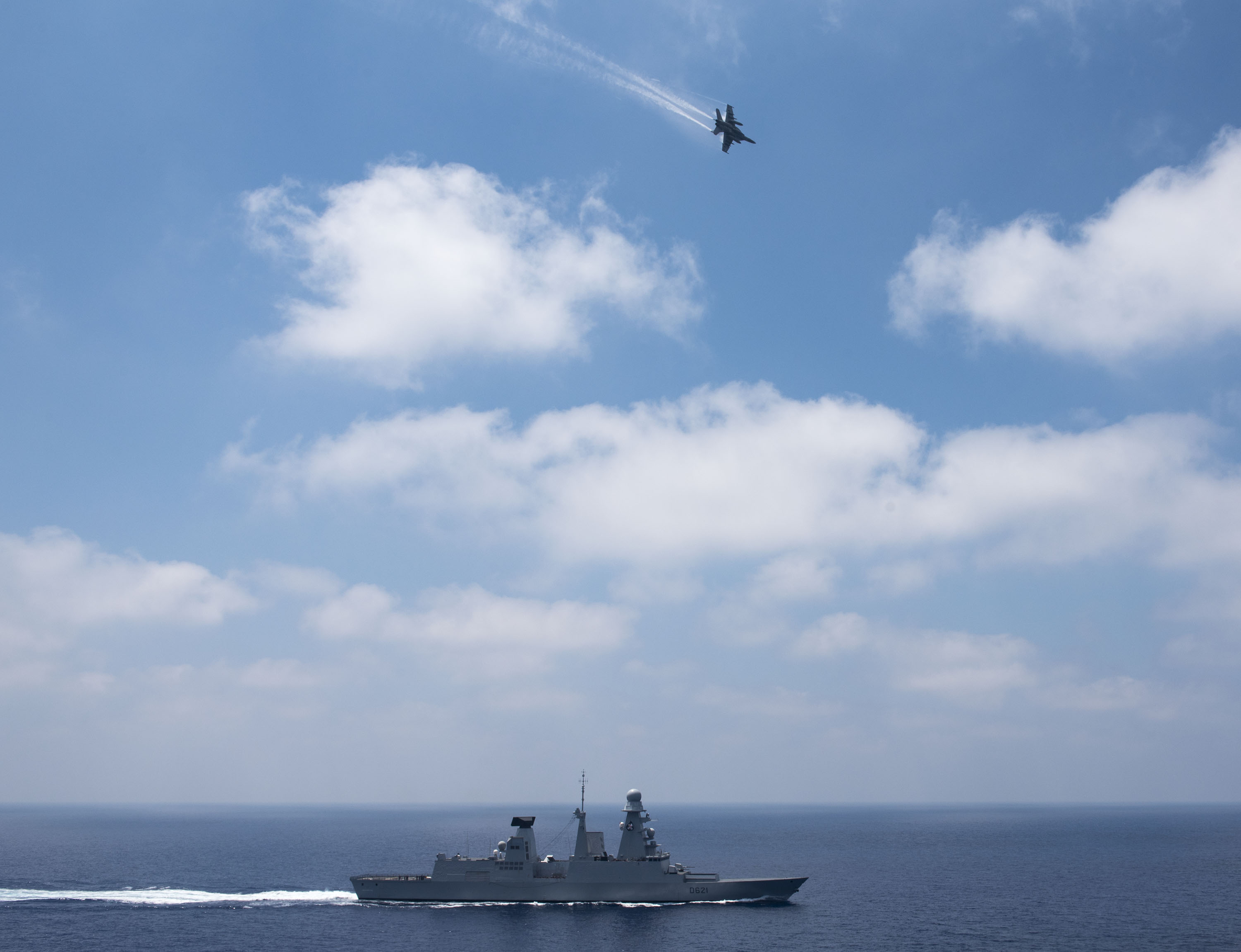
Chevalier Paul with an aircraft carrier in the Mediterranean Sea

In May 2017, Chevalier Paul completed its intermediate technical stop which saw the replacement of the two 76 mm turrets named "Hercule" and "Licorne".

=== Coronavirus pandemic ===
During the COVID-19 pandemic, on 15 April 2020, the Ministry of Armed Forces reported that, out of the 1,767 tests conducted on the members of the carrier battle group led by Charles de Gaulle, 668 returned positive. (Note: 30% of the tests were still inconclusive.) The vast majority of these cases were aboard Charles de Gaulle, and the remainder of the cases were aboard Chevalier Paul.

On 12 April the French Navy reported that Charles de Gaulle and accompanying air-defense frigate Chevalier Paul had returned to Toulon, while command and replenishment tanker Somme and anti-submarine frigate La Motte-Picquet had returned to Brest. The 200 sailors of Chevalier Paul were subsequently quarantined for two weeks.

On 15 April, the Ministry of Armed Forces reported that, out of the 1,767 tests that had been conducted on the members of the carrier battle group so far, 668 had returned positive. (Note: 30% of the tests were still inconclusive at the time.) The vast majority of these cases were aboard Charles de Gaulle, and the remainder of the cases were reported to be aboard Chevalier Paul.

On 17 April, Maryline Gygax Généro, Central Director of the Military Health Service, reported to the Senate Foreign Affairs, Defense, and Armed Forces Committee that all 2,300 sailors of the carrier battle group had been tested upon their return to Toulon, and so far, 940 had tested positive while 645 had tested negative. (Note: Her exact words were "Sur les 2300 marins du groupe aéronaval autour du porte-avions Charles de Gaulle, tous testés à leur retour à Toulon, 940 ont été testés positifs, 645 négatifs, les autres résultats de tests n'étant pas encore connus".) On the same day, Florence Parly, Minister of the Armed Forces, reported to the National Assembly's National Defense and Armed Forces Committee that 2,010 sailors of the carrier battle group had been tested, with 1,081 tests returning positive so far.

In total, 545 sailors had shown symptoms and 24 had been hospitalized at the Saint Anne Army Teaching Hospital, including one admitted to an ICU.

On 29 April 2020, the Navy stated that 19 sailors aboard Chevalier Paul had tested positive upon arrival at Toulon.

On 11 May 2020, Florence Parly reported to the National Assembly the conclusions of two investigations (Note: One investigation was epidemiological, while the other was of command.) into the outbreak on board the carrier, stating that the virus had first arrived before a stopover made in Brest, and that although the command and medical team aboard the carrier had "excessive confidence" (Note: The original words were "confiance excessive".) in their ability to deal with the virus, the investigations did not consider them at fault.

Parly further explained that the introduction of the virus on board the carrier happened sometime between when it left Limassol, Cyprus, on 26 February 2020, and when it arrived at Brest on 13 March. During this time, personnel had been brought on board via air from either Cyprus, Sicily, the Balearic Islands, Spain, or Portugal. The spread of the virus, however, was exacerbated by the stopover at Brest. Social distancing and other measures were taken after the stopover, but they weighed heavily on crew morale, so after enforcing the strict measures for a fortnight, they were relaxed, and a concert on board was authorized for 30 March.

Parly also noted that all soldiers aboard Charles de Gaulle have since recovered from the disease except for one sailor, who was still hospitalized after leaving the ICU.

=== Operation Aspides ===
On 16 August 2024 Chevalier Paul crossed the Suez Canal and joined the European Naval Force in the Red Sea. On 22 August, the frigate evacuated and assisted the crew of the Greek tanker Sounion, previously attacked by two Houti armed boats off Yemen and disabled. During the rescue Chevalier Paul destroyed a naval drone with its 20 mm Narwhal guns.

In May 2026, the frigate was again operating in the Indian Ocean, accompanying the aircraft carrier Charles de Gaulle and other French vessels, in response to the American/Israeli War with Iran.
