= French tanker Var =

French Navy command and replenishment ship

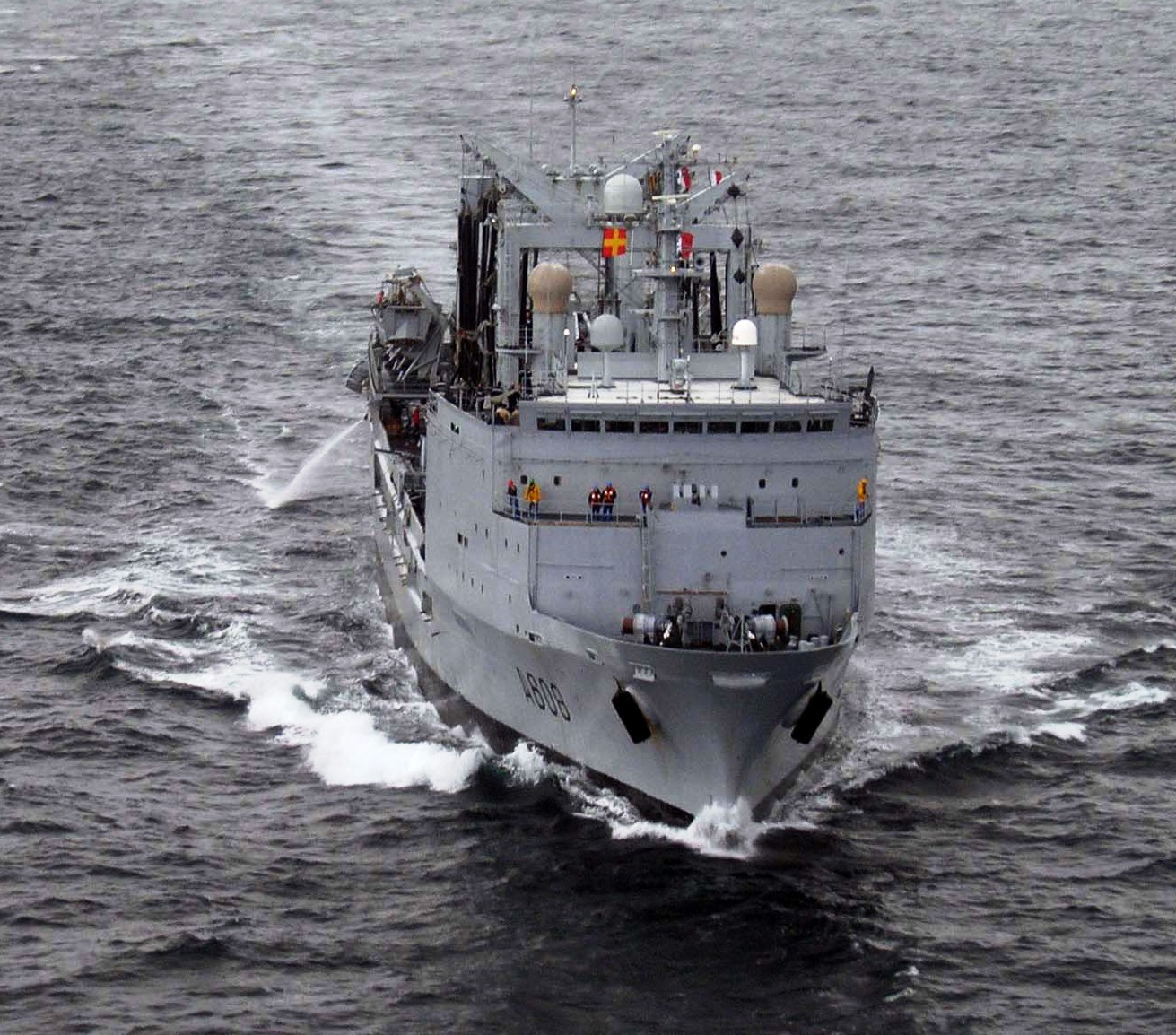
- Var underway on 4 December 2006

History

France
- Name: Var
- Namesake: Var
- Builder: Brest Arsenal, Brest
- Laid down: 8 May 1979
- Launched: 1 June 1981
- Commissioned: 29 January 1983
- Decommissioned: 1 July 2021
- Home port: Toulon
- Identification: MMSI number: 228781000; Callsign: FBVA; Pennant number: A 608
- Status: Decommissioned

General characteristics of French ships
- Type: Durance-class replenishment oiler and command ship
- Displacement: 7,900 t (7,800 long tons) standard; 18,800 t (18,500 long tons) (full load)
- Length: 157.2 m (515 ft 9 in)
- Beam: 21.2 m (69 ft 7 in)
- Draught: 8.65 m (28 ft 5 in) standard; 10.8 m (35 ft 5 in) full load
- Propulsion: 2 × SEMT Pielstick 16 PC2.5 V 400 diesel engines; 2 shafts, 15,000 kW (20,000 hp)
- Speed: 19 knots (35 km/h; 22 mph)
- Range: 9,000 nmi (17,000 km; 10,000 mi) at 15 knots (28 km/h; 17 mph)
- Complement: 162
- Sensors & processing systems: 2 x DRBN 34 radars
- Armament: 1 x Bofors 40 mm (1.6 in)/L60 gun; 4 x 12.7 mm (0.5 in) M2 Browning machine guns; 3 x Simbad Mistral missile launcher
- Aviation facilities: Medium helicopter pad

Var was a Durance-class command and replenishment tanker (French: Bâtiment de commandement et de ravitaillement, BCR) of the French Navy. In addition to its primary duty as a fleet tanker, Var was configured as a flagship and served as such in the Indian Ocean. The ship was laid down on 8 May 1979 by Brest Arsenal at their yard in Brest, France. She was launched on 1 June 1981, commissioned on 29 January 1983 and assigned to the Force d'action navale (FAN, "Naval Action Force"). Var took part in several multi-national operations. The tanker was decommissioned on 1 July 2021.

== Development and design ==
In French service, the final three Durance-class tankers are called Bâtiment de commandement et ravitailleur (BCR, "command and replenishment ship"). In addition to their role as a fleet tanker, the three ships dubbed BCR can accommodate an entire general staff and thus supervise naval operations as a command ship. The three ships of the class designated BCRs, Var, Marne and Somme all have superstructures that were extended aft by 8 m (26 ft) to accommodate the additional staff requirements. The BCRs have one crane positioned along the centreline.

Durance-class ships have a standard displacement of 7,900 tonnes (7,800 long tons) and 18,800 t (18,500 long tons) at full load. The oiler is 157.3 metres (516 ft 1 in) long overall and 149 metres (488 ft 10 in) between perpendiculars with a beam of 21.2 m (69 ft 7 in) and a draught of 8.65 m (28 ft 5 in) empty and 10.8 m (35 ft 5 in) at full load. Var is powered by two SEMT Pielstick 16 PC2.5 V 400 diesel engines turning two LIPS controllable pitch propellers rated at 15,000 kilowatts (20,000 hp). The vessel has a maximum speed of 19 knots (35 km/h; 22 mph) and a range of 9,000 nautical miles (17,000 km; 10,000 mi) at 15 knots (28 km/h; 17 mph).

They have two dual solid/liquid underway transfer stations per side and can replenish two ships per side and one astern. The ship initially had capacity for 5,170 t (5,090 long tons) of fuel oil, 3,360 t (3,310 long tons) of diesel fuel, 1,160 t (1,140 long tons) of JP-5 aviation fuel, 250 t (250 long tons) of distilled water, 180 t (180 long tons) of provisions, 170 t (170 long tons) of munitions and 15 t (15 long tons) of spare parts. These numbers change with the needs of the fleet.

The Durance-class tankers all mount a flight deck over the stern and a hangar. The ships utilise Aérospatiale Alouette III and Westland Lynx helicopters but are capable of operating larger ones from their flight deck. For defence, Var initially mounted one Bofors 40-millimetre (1.6 in)/L60 anti-aircraft (AA) gun in a single gun turret and two 20 mm (0.8 in) AA guns in a twin turret. The ship is equipped with two DRBN 34 navigational radars. The armament was later altered by removing the 20 mm guns and adding four 12.7 mm (0.5 in) M2 Browning machine guns and three launchers for Simbad Mistral surface-to-air missiles. The ship has a complement of 162 and is capable of accommodating 250 personnel.

== Construction and career ==
The third tanker of the Durance class was laid down on 8 May 1979 by Brest Arsenal at their yard in Brest, France. She was launched on 1 June 1981 and given the pennant number A 608. Var was commissioned into the French Navy on 29 January 1983. The Durance-class ships were assigned to the Force d'action navale (FAR, "Naval Action Force") after entering service. One of the BCRs is assigned to Indian Ocean as flagship of the French naval forces in the region. Her homeport is in Toulon. In addition to its mission of logistical support for other ships, Var like its sister ships Marne and Somme was able to carry additional command staff of 45 people.

Var was tasked with providing support for the French aircraft carrier Foch during Operation Trident airstrikes against Yugoslavia in 1999 . As the ship assigned to the Indian Ocean during the 11 September 2001 attacks on the United States, Var was one of the first French vessels to take part in Operation Enduring Freedom beginning on 3 October. In 2005, Var was sent to provide humanitarian relief following an earthquake in Pakistan. From 3 August 2006 to July 2009, the ship was the flagship of ALINDIEN (L'amiral, commandant la Zone Maritime Océan Indien).

In 2009, with the retirement of the ship dedicated to naval mine supply for the French Navy, Var became central to the Groupes Guerre des Mines (Mine Warfare Group). Var took part in mine warfare exercises with NATO in 2010 and in 2011, deployed with the Groupes Guerre des Mines for three months in the Persian Gulf. In November 2013, the ship was engaged in Operation Active Endeavour in the Eastern Mediterranean.

In April 2015, the ship took command of the Combined Task Force 150 (CTF 150) in Operation Enduring Freedom. In April 2018, Var participated in Operation Hamilton in Syria.

In June 2021, the ship returned to Toulon following a final deployment to the Indian Ocean and was withdrawn from service on 1 July.

== Gallery ==
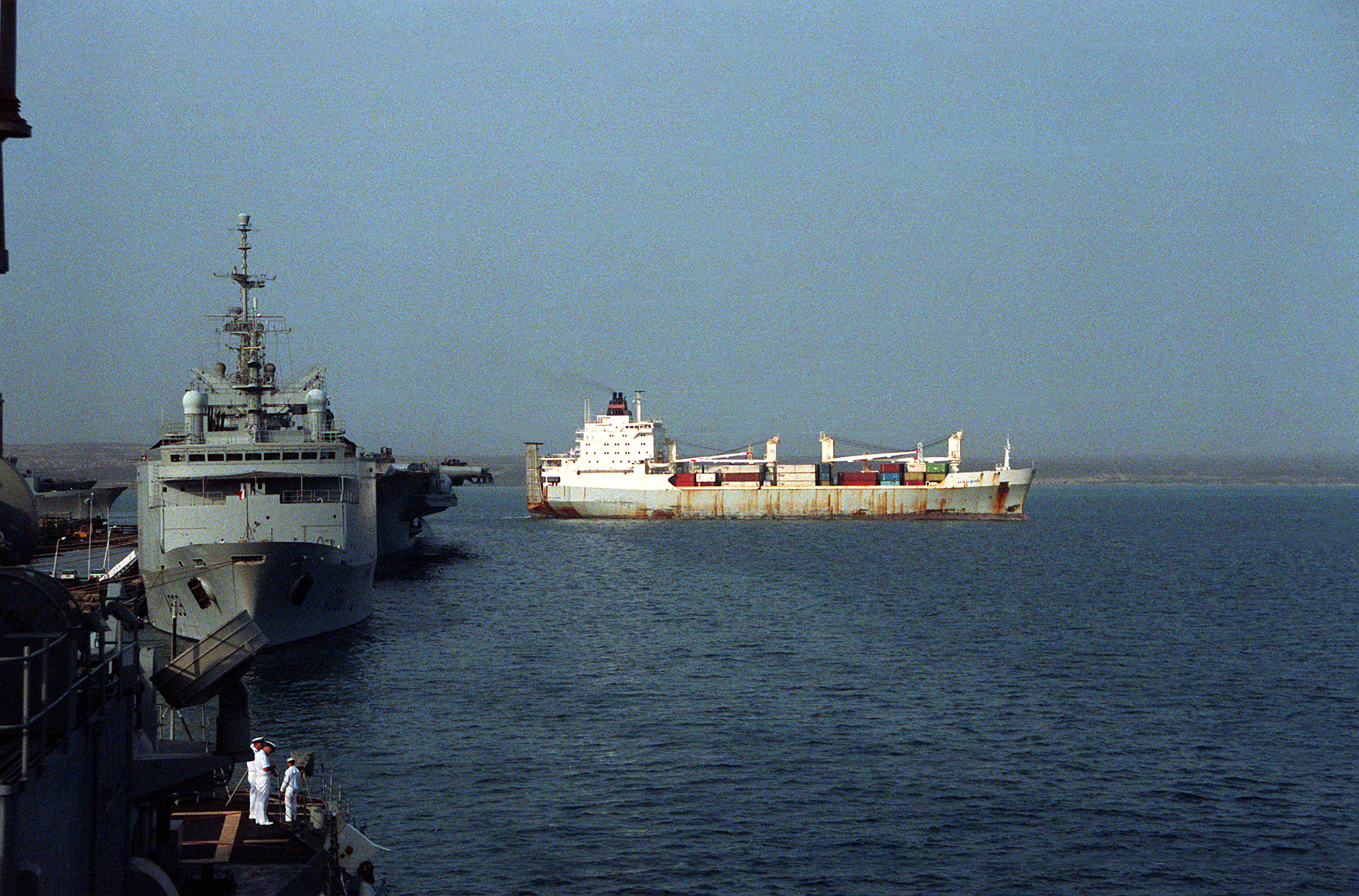
Var on 24 August 1990 during Operation Desert Shield.

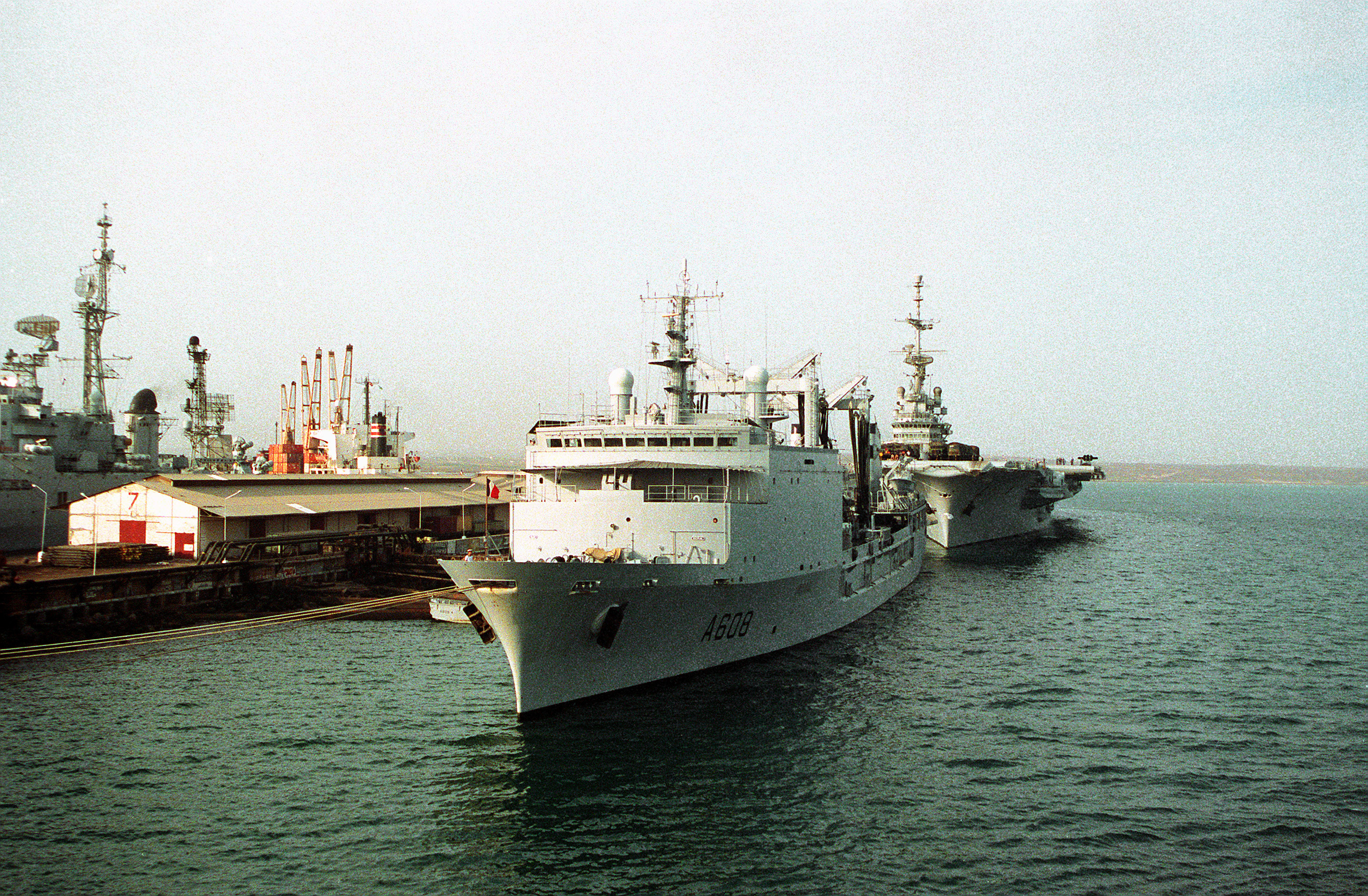
Var and Clemenceau on 24 August 1990 during Operation Desert Shield.

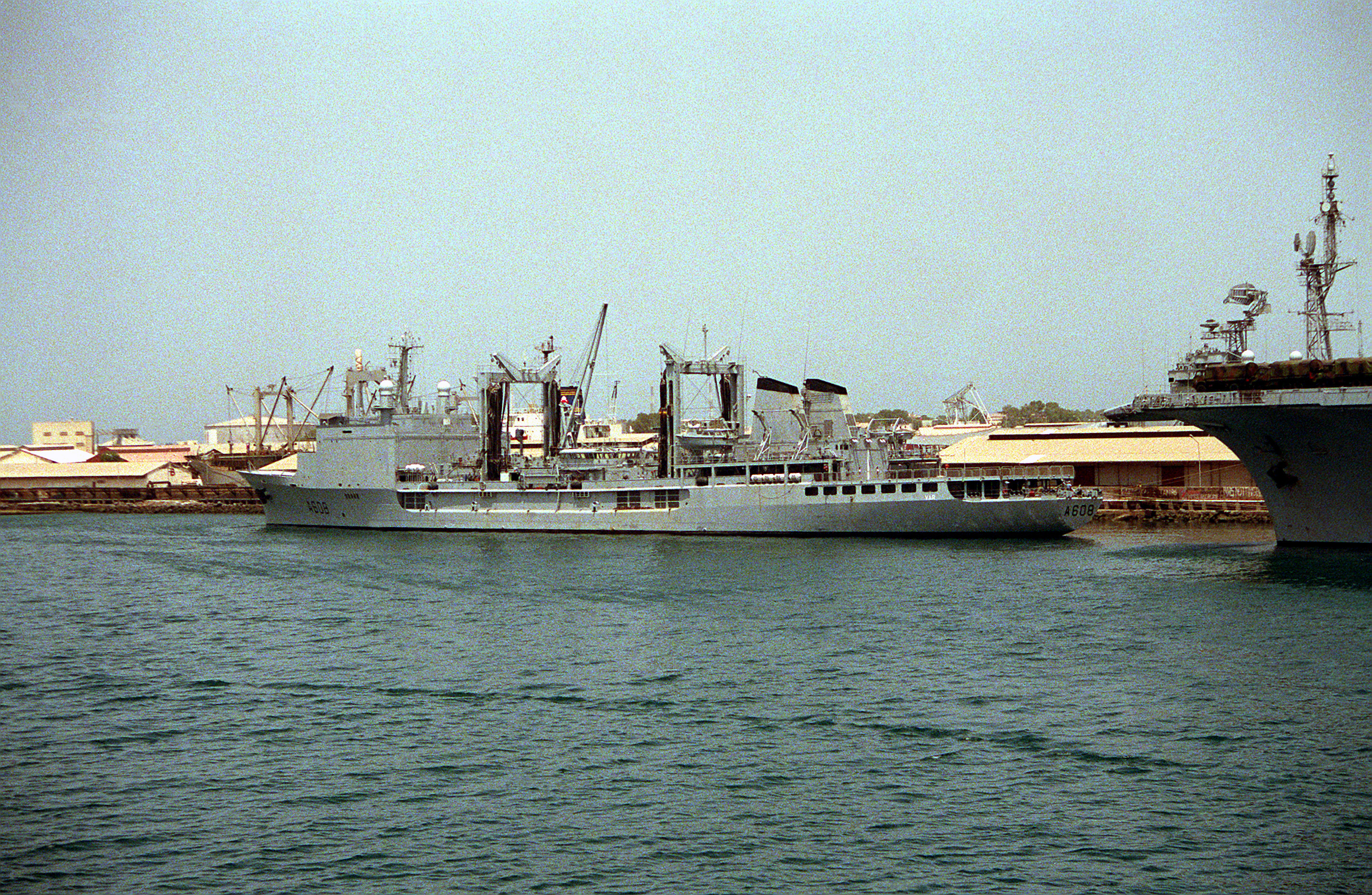
Var and Clemenceau on 24 August 1990 during Operation Desert Shield.

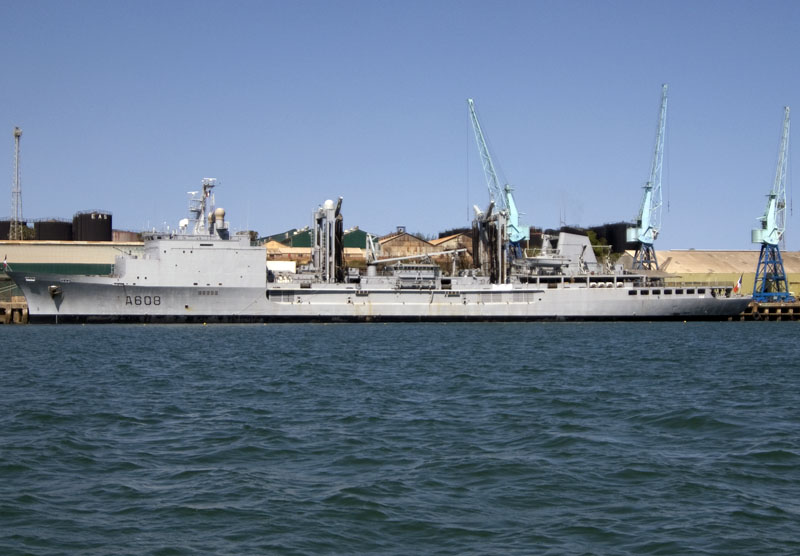
Var at Mombasa in March 2008.

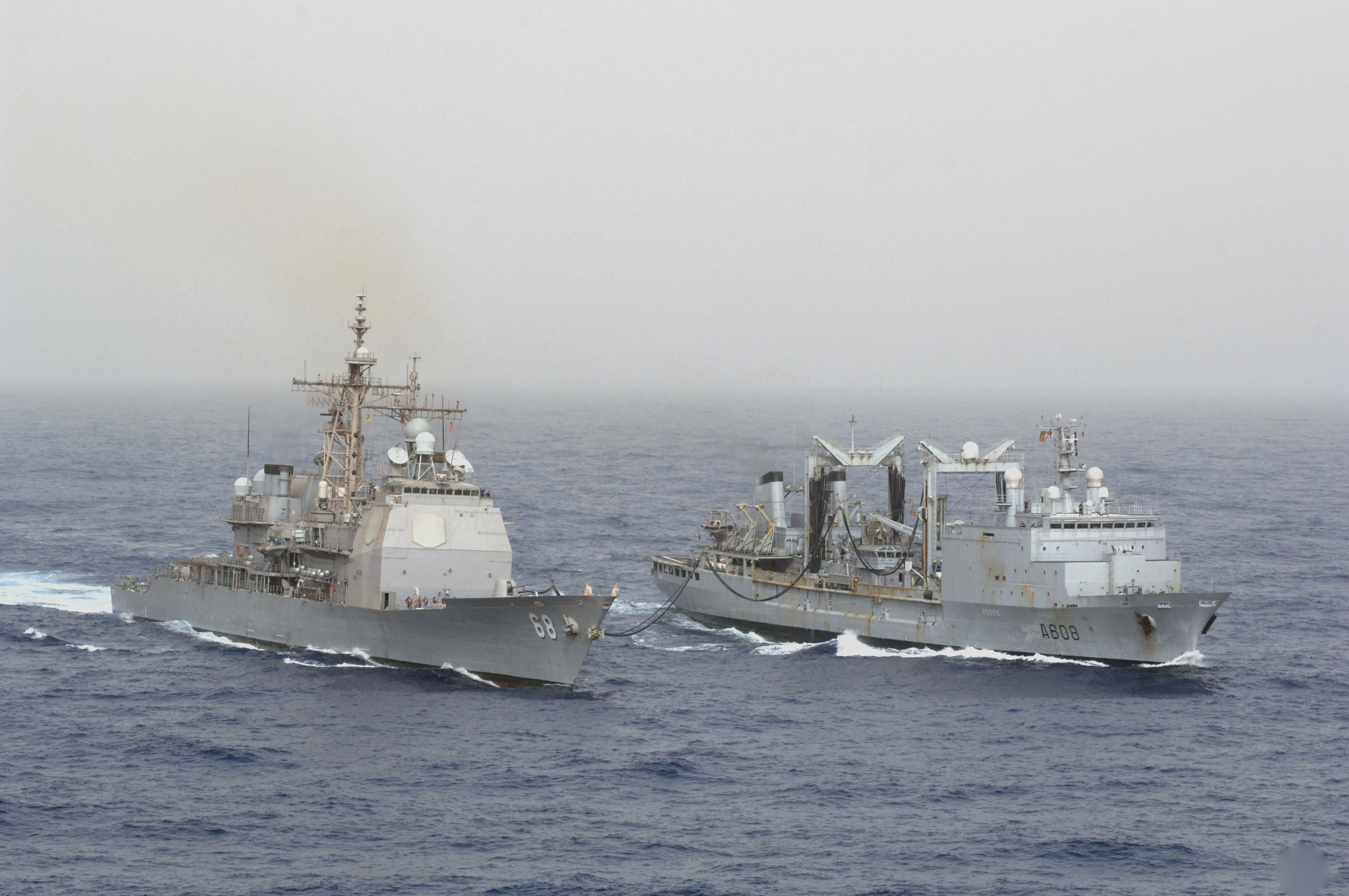
Var replenishes USS Anzio on 6 July 2009.

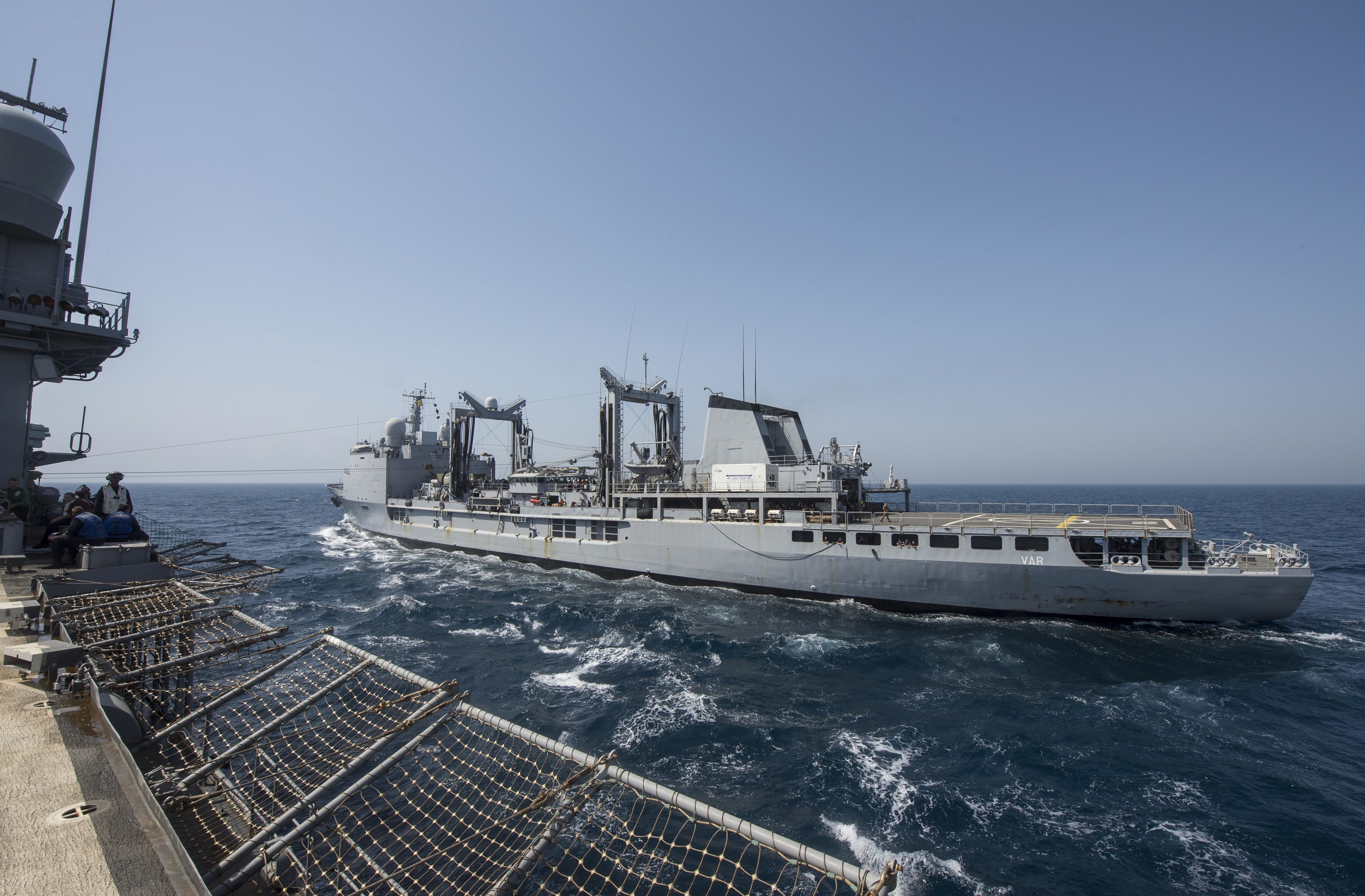
Var replenishes USS Vella Gulf in the Persian Gulf on 19 June 2017
