= French tanker Somme =

French Navy command and replenishment ship

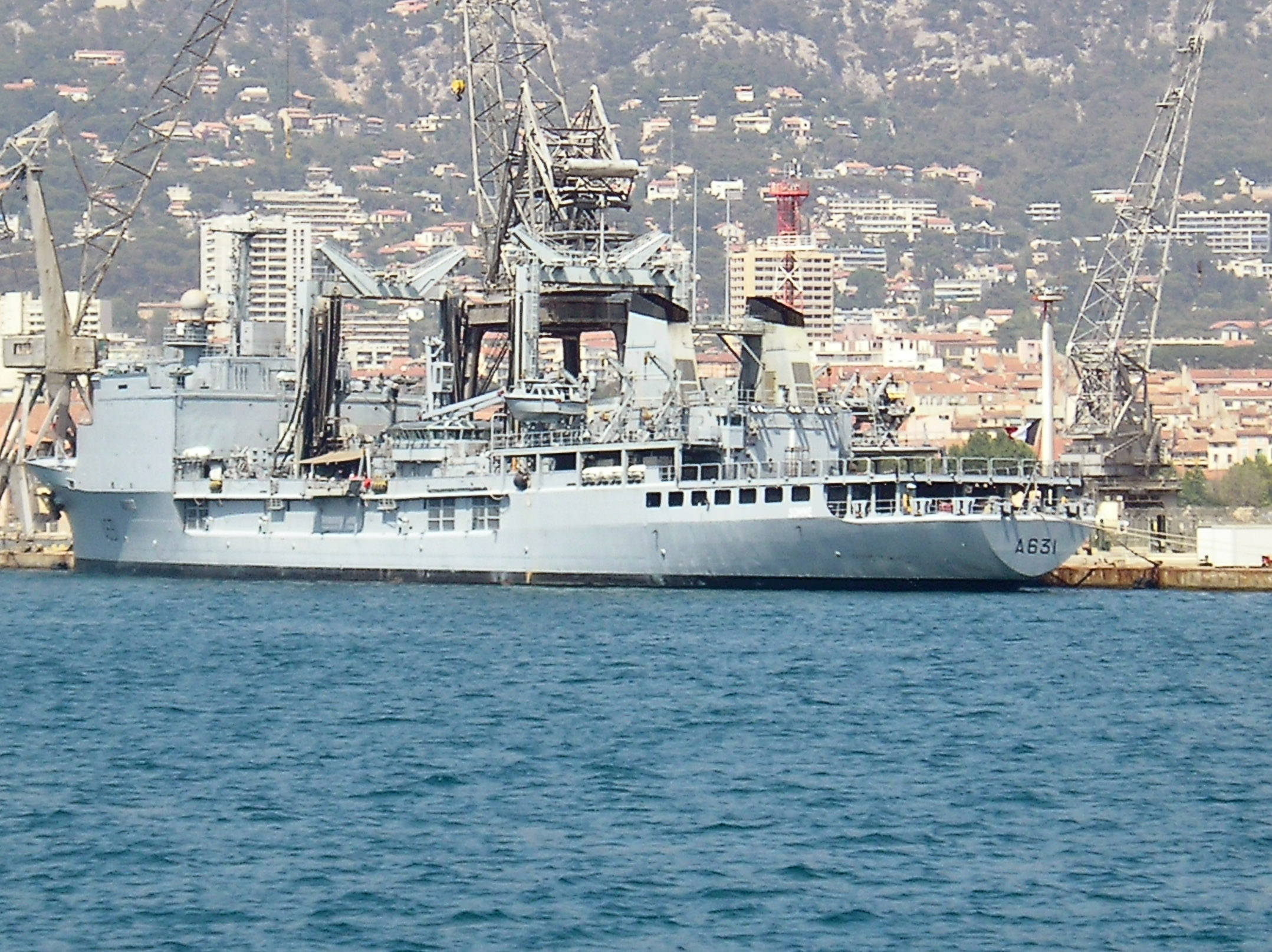
- Somme in Toulon harbour, May 2009

History

France
- Name: Somme
- Namesake: Somme river
- Builder: Normed, La Seyne, France
- Laid down: 3 May 1985
- Launched: 3 October 1987
- Commissioned: 7 March 1990
- Home port: Brest, France
- Identification: Pennant number: A 631; Call sign: FBSO; MMSI number: 228779000
- Fate: In service

General characteristics of French ships
- Type: Durance-class replenishment oiler and command ship
- Displacement: 7,900 t (7,800 long tons) standard; 18,800 t (18,500 long tons) (full load)
- Length: 157.2 m (515 ft 9 in)
- Beam: 21.2 m (69 ft 7 in)
- Draught: 8.65 m (28 ft 5 in) standard; 10.8 m (35 ft 5 in) full load
- Propulsion: 2 × SEMT Pielstick 16 PC2.5 V 400 diesel engines; 2 shafts, 15,000 kW (20,000 hp)
- Speed: 19 knots (35 km/h; 22 mph)
- Range: 9,000 nmi (17,000 km; 10,000 mi) at 15 knots (28 km/h; 17 mph)
- Complement: 162
- Sensors & processing systems: 2 x DRBN 34 radars
- Armament: 1 x Bofors 40 mm (1.6 in)/L60 gun; 4 x 12.7 mm (0.5 in) M2 Browning machine guns; 3 x Simbad Mistral missile launcher
- Aviation facilities: Medium helicopter pad

The French tanker Somme is a Durance-class command and replenishment tanker (French: Bâtiment de commandement et de ravitaillement, BCR) of the French Navy. In addition to its primary duty as a fleet tanker, Somme is configured as a flagship and has served as such in the Indian Ocean. The vessel was constructed at La Seyne, France beginning in 1985 and entered service in 1990. As of 2023, with the retirement of her sister ship Marne, she is the last vessel of her class in service with the French Navy.

In October 2009, the ship was mistakenly attacked by pirates off the coast of Somalia. The attack was repelled and the pirates captured.

== Design and description ==
In French service, the final three Durance-class tankers are called Bâtiment de commandement et ravitailleur (BCR, "command and replenishment ship"). In addition to their role as a fleet tanker, the three ships dubbed BCR can accommodate an entire general staff and thus supervise naval operations as a command ship. The three ships of the class designated BCRs, Var, Marne and Somme all have superstructures that were extended aft by 8 m (26 ft) to accommodate the additional staff requirements. The BCRs have one crane positioned along the centreline.

Somme has a standard displacement of 7,900 t (7,800 long tons) and 18,800 t (18,500 long tons) at full load. The oiler is 157.3 metres (516 ft 1 in) long overall and 149 m (488 ft 10 in) between perpendiculars with a beam of 21.2 m (69 ft 7 in) and a draught of 8.65 m (28 ft 5 in) empty and 10.8 m (35 ft 5 in) at full load. Somme is powered by two SEMT Pielstick 16 PC2.5 V 400 diesel engines turning two LIPS controllable pitch propellers rated at 15,000 kilowatts (20,000 hp). The vessel has a maximum speed of 19 knots (35 km/h; 22 mph) and a range of 9,000 nmi (17,000 km; 10,000 mi) at 15 knots (28 km/h; 17 mph).

Somme has two dual solid/liquid underway transfer stations per side and can replenish two ships per side and one astern. The ship initially had capacity for 5,170 t (5,090 long tons) of fuel oil, 3,360 t (3,310 long tons) of diesel fuel, 1,160 t (1,140 long tons) of JP-5 aviation fuel, 250 t (250 long tons) of distilled water, 180 t (180 long tons) of provisions, 170 t (170 long tons) of munitions and 15 t (15 long tons) of spare parts. These numbers change with the needs of the fleet.

The Durance-class tankers all mount a flight deck over the stern and a hangar. The ships utilise Aérospatiale Alouette III and Westland Lynx helicopters but are capable of operating larger ones from their flight deck. For defence, Somme initially mounted one Bofors 40 mm/L60 anti-aircraft (AA) gun in a single gun turret and two 20 mm (0.8 in) AA guns in a twin turret. The ship is equipped with two DRBN 34 navigational radars. The armament was later altered by removing the 20 mm guns and adding four 12.7 mm (0.5 in) M2 Browning machine guns and three launchers for Simbad Mistral surface-to-air missiles. The ship has a complement of 162 and is capable of accommodating 250 personnel.

== Construction and career ==
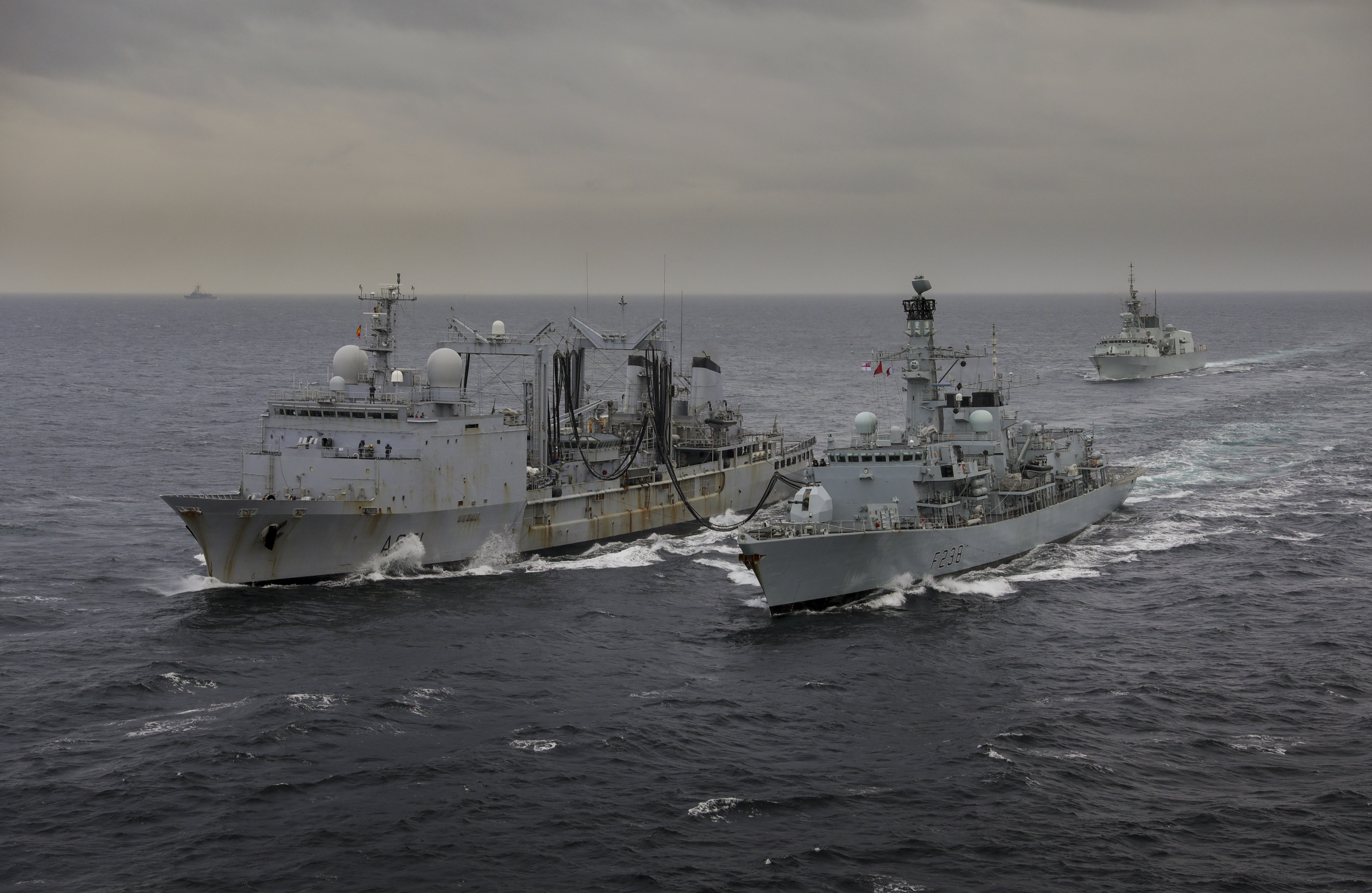
Somme (left) replenishes HMS Northumberland in 2018

The fifth and final tanker of the Durance class was ordered in March 1984 as part of the 1984–1988 plan. The vessel was laid down on 3 May 1985 by Normed at their yard in La Seyne, France. Named for a river in France, the ship was launched on 3 October 1987 and given the pennant number A 631. Somme was commissioned into the French Navy on 7 March 1990. The Durance-class ships were assigned to the Force d'action navale (FAR, "Naval Action Force") after entering service. One of the BCRs is assigned to Indian Ocean as flagship of the French naval forces in the region. The ship is home ported in Brest, France.

In April 2008, the commander of ALINDIEN, the French command in the Indian Ocean, commanded the strike from Somme that freed the yacht Le Ponant from Somali pirates. Serving as the command vessel for the French forces participating in Operation Atalanta, Somme was attacked approximately 250 nautical miles (460 km; 290 mi) off the Somali coast in the night of 6 to 7 October 2009 by two motorboats of Somali pirates who mistook Somme for a civilian ship. Somme repelled the assault rifle attack without sustaining damage or casualties and captured five of the pirates. Again on 20 April 2010, Somali pirates in a skiff mistakenly attacked Somme, firing at the vessel with automatic weapons. The French crew returned three warning shots and pursued the attackers, discovering a pirate mothership with two pirates on board. The four pirates in the skiff along with the two on the mothership were taken into custody.

At the end of 2018, Somme underwent a refit at Brest, returning to service on 5 June 2019. In October 2019, Somme was deployed as part of Operation Corymbe, the French naval mission to the Gulf of Guinea, marking the first time a command ship was deployed there. During the deployment, Somme participated in the African naval exercise Grand African Nemo with 18 African nations.

As of late 2021, of the original five Durance-class ships in the French Navy, only Somme and her sister ship Marne remained in service. The last two ships were expected to be replaced by the new Jacques Chevallier-class vessels and retire between 2022 and 2025. In 2022 it was indicated that Somme would continue in service until 2027 when she is planned to be replaced by the third of the Jacques Chevallier-class support ships, Émile Bertin. It was later reported that her out of service date had been extended to 2028.

In October 2025, Somme conducted the first at-sea replenishment of the new frigate Amiral Ronarc'h.
