= Camp de la Paix =

French military base in the United Arab Emirates

Coordinates: 24.52151°N 54.396107°E

- United Arab Emirates

Site information
- Operator: France
- Controlled by: French Armed Forces
- Condition: Operational

Site history
- Built for: Military Airbase, Joint base

Garrison information
- Occupants: 250-650 soldiers

Camp de la Paix (Arabic: معسكر السلام, lit. 'Peace Camp'), also known as Implantation militaire française aux Émirats arabes unis (Arabic: الوجود العسكري الفرنسي في الإمارات العربية المتحدة, lit. 'French Military Settlement in the United Arab Emirates') abbreviated IMFEAU, is a French Naval Air Station based in Abu Dhabi, United Arab Emirates, since 2009.

== History ==
France and the United Arab Emirates have previously signed a mutual defence agreement in 1995. In January 2008 during the visit of President Nicolas Sarkozy to the UAE, France and the UAE agreed to establish the base in Abu Dhabi. The base was inaugurated on 26 May 2009.

At inauguration, the base was the first foreign military installation established by France in 50 years and its first ever base outside Africa.

According to the agreement signed in 2008, the UAE financed the infrastructure while France will continue to finance the equipment and the operational costs of the base.

== Organisation ==
The base comprises three military camps of the French Army that harbour around 250 personnel.

The base operates under ALINDIEN, the Admiral who heads the French forces in the Indian Ocean.

=== Naval base ===
The naval base is located in Port Zayed, at the end of the commerce harbour. It comprises a 300-metre long dock with a 200-metre wide area, and can host ships up to 10 metres of draught. This allows docking of all French Navy ships, save for the French aircraft carrier Charles de Gaulle. The base faces the Straits of Hormuz, a position of vital economic importance. Approximately 40% of the world's oil passes through the Hormuz Strait. The naval component of the base will have 72 staff members. It will accommodate boat stops in the region and will serve as "the preferred support ships of the Navy in the region".

=== Air base ===
The United States 908th Expeditionary Air Refueling Squadron conducts an aerial refuel with a French Rafale over southwest Asia.

The air component is named "Air base 104 Al Dhafra". Since 1 October 2008, three fighters have been based there. The base parcel granted to the French Air Force can harbour up to six aircraft. The land base has 3 Mirage 2000-5 jet fighters currently on station in addition to 57 members of the military on staff.

=== Land base ===
A training camp was opened for the French Army, 50 km from Abu Dhabi. It is equipped to train soldiers for urban and desert operations. The land portion of the base holds 93 soldiers within. The soldiers tasked with maintaining the land portion of the base "will have the task to ensure the missions of education and training for fighting in urban areas and in the desert". In 2011, the 13th Demi-Brigade of the Foreign Legion moved from Djibouti to the base and was in turn replaced there by the 5th Cuirassier Regiment in 2016.

== See also ==
- France-United Arab Emirates relations
