= ALINDIEN =

French naval admiral in charge of the Indian Ocean maritime zone

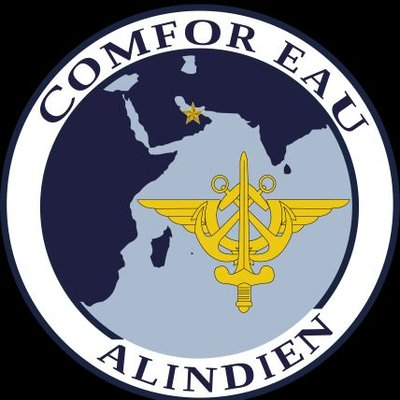

ALINDIEN is a French naval acronym designing the admiral in charge of the maritime zone of the Indian Ocean, and of the French forces there. The office has been held by Contre-amiral Didier Piaton since 8 September 2016.

== Organisation ==
=== Zone of authority ===
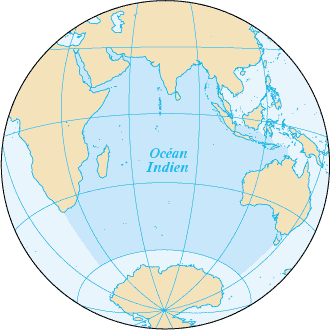
Indian Ocean

ALINDIEN's jurisdiction extends over the maritime zone of the Indian Ocean, dubbed "ZMOI" (zone maritime de l'océan Indien): it comprises the area bounded on its western part by the Red Sea and Africa, and on its eastern part by the Philippines and Vietnam. The zone notably comprises such strategic areas as the Persian Gulf, Southern Africa, India, Australia and Singapore.

The zones of La Réunion and of the French Southern and Antarctic Lands operate under a different hierarchy, fr:Forces armées de la zone sud de l'océan Indien.

=== Missions ===
In his role as a maritime zone commander, ALINDIEN operates directly under the Chief of the Defence Staff. As a fleet commander, he operates under ALFAN, Amiral FAN, the Admiral in charge of the Force d'action navale ( for matters of management, training and preparation of the units permanently stationed in the Indian Ocean. The units are mostly stationed in La Réunion and Djibouti.

ALINDIEN is tasked with the operational control of the naval forces deployed in his area, unless they are detached with their own general staff. This command is exercised from a Durance-class command and replenishment oiler (BCR) carrying the entire general staff. Which exact ship is deployed depends on unit turnover, as the ships are relieved every four years; Marne has served in this capacity from mid-2002. ALINDIEN was the only naval command of the French Navy that is permanently stationed at sea. In late 2010, the commanding staff moved ashore to the Abu Dhabi base and the permanently sea-stationed status of the command ended.

ALINDIEN also has defence diplomacy duties with all neighbouring countries. He supervises the French bases in Djibouti, La Réunion, and the Abu Dhabi base (since 2009).

=== Deployment ===
The following units are permanently under ALINDIEN command:

- Nivôse, Floréal-class frigate based in La Réunion
- Floréal, Floréal-class frigate based in La Réunion
- Commando Arta, a 60-man commando based in Djibouti
- One Atlantique 2 naval patrol plane, based in Djibouti

Reinforcements can be deployed under ALINDIEN's authority for punctual operations.

== History ==
During the Iran–Iraq War, ALINDIEN's office managed Opération Promethée, that aimed at preventing any action from either Iraq or Iran against oil shipping. Minesweepers were deployed in several occasions to secure shipping lines.

In January 1986, Vice-amiral Gilbert Le Meledo carried out evacuation of the foreign citizens from Aden. The French ship Jules Verne was particularly involved in the operation.

During the Gulf War, Contre-amiral Pierre Bonnot commanded a number of war actions, and was later involved in enforcing the Iraq sanctions, as well as minesweeping in Kuwaiti waters.

In 1992, Contre-amiral Gérard Gazzano and Hubert Foillard supported the United Nations Operation in Somalia I. From March 1993 until March 1995, Admirals Hubert Foillard and Jean-Luc Delaunay supported UNOSOM II. From 8 to 14 April 1994, Delaunay also supervised a second evacuation of foreign citizens from Aden, with Jules Verne playing a prominent role again.

In 1996, Contre-amiral Alain Béreau supervised Operation Condor, a UN mission to monitor Hanish Islands in the context of a mediation between Yemen and Eritrea.

In 1998, Contre-amiral Jean-Louis Battet supervised Operation Khor Angar, securing the shores of Djibouti during the Eritrean–Ethiopian War.

From 2001, Opération Héracles has been in force, in the context of the "war on terror".

In January 2005, Vice-amiral Xavier Rolin supervised Opération Beryx, a humanitarian mission to relieve populations victim of the 2004 Indian Ocean earthquake. Dupleix, Georges Leygues and Jeanne d'Arc were notably involved.

== Notes ==
- See also 'Interview,' Helmoed-Romer Heitman with Rear Admiral Alain Bereau (Alindien), Jane's Defence Weekly 4 December 1996, p. 40
