= Chevalier Paul =

French admiral and naval officer

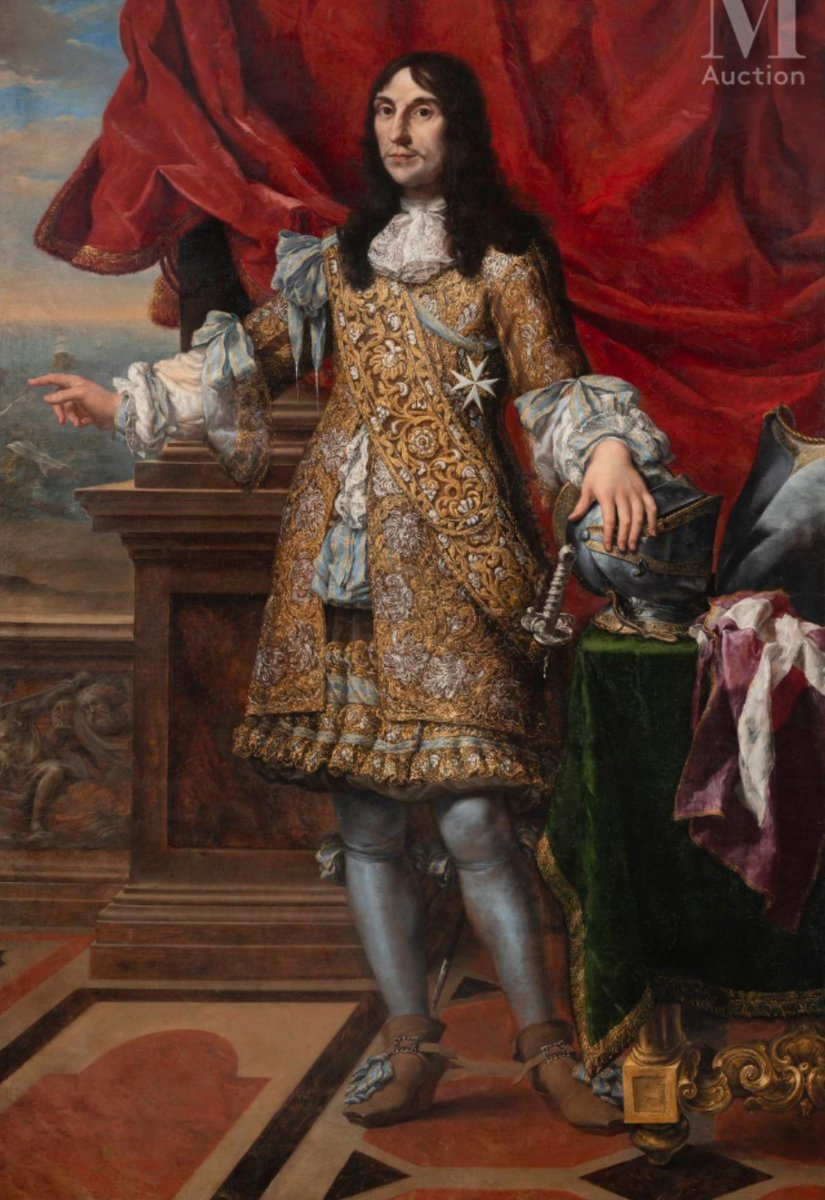
- Portrait of Paul
- Born: Jean-Paul de Saumeur; 1598; Marseille, France
- Died: 20 December 1667 (aged 68–69)
- Known for: Knight of Grace of the Order

Jean-Paul de Saumeur (1598 – 20 December 1667), often called Chevalier Paul, was a French admiral and naval officer who served in several Mediterranean campaigns. Despite his very modest origins, he was attracted to the Navy from a young age. After having been a simple seaman on behalf of the Order of Saint John of Jerusalem, from which he was excluded for having killed his corporal, he became a privateer in the Mediterranean Sea then joined the Royal Navy at the request of Cardinal Richelieu and fought during the entirety of the Franco-Spanish War (1635–1659). In 1649, he sunk an English ship which had 36 cannons with important cargo, that had refused to salute the French pavilion. From the enemy crew only three or four men were saved, and the other 140 crew members perished by drowning. His numerous victories earned him the appointment of lieutenant-general and vice-admiral of the Levant. He was named a knight of grace and a commander by the Grand Master Martin de Redin. He ended his career in 1666 by transporting the princess of Savoie-Nemours to Lisbon, who would later become the queen of Portugal. A skilled courtier, he did not forget his modest origins and knew how to be generous.

== Origins and Youth ==
According to unconfirmed rumors, he was the son of a laundress and of Paul de Fortia, Marquis of Piles, governor of the Chateau d'If. However, Captain Georges Bourgoin, Secretary of the Academy of Sciences, Letters and Fine Arts in Marseille, discovered that Chevalier Paul was not the natural child of the Marquis and a washerwoman. He highlighted Paul's legitimate parentage of an officer from a Catholic and bourgeois family in the Dauphiné, Captain Elzias Samuel and young lady Jeanne Riche, who were married in Marseille. The Council of the Grand Priory of Saint-Gilles, in view of the documents produced, concluded indeed, on November 14, 1633, he was "worthy to be received among the brothers-arms and go to the convent in Malta."

The transformation of his surname Samuel into Samuel or Saumeur would have been intended to avoid allusions to a distant Jewish origin, He always called himself "Capitaine Paul". He spent the first years of his life at Château d'If with Father Julien de Malaucène, but from a young age he felt the desire to travel. He travelled for three years before entering into the service of a commander of the order of St. John of Jerusalem as a sailor.

Saumeur began sailing at the age of twelve in the navy of the Order of Malta.

== Military career ==
=== In service of the Order of Saint John of Jerusalem ===
Several years later, Paul returned to Malta and served as a soldier at Fort Saint Elmo. In 1614, resenting his corporal, he challenged him to a duel and killed him. He was immediately arrested, but some French knights of the Order obtained pardon from the Grand Master Alof de Wignacourt, on condition that he leave the Order. (Note: “Paul was immediately arrested: there was everything to fear, had not some Marseillan knights acted powerfully in his favor with the Grand-Master. They obtained his pardon, broke his engagement, and he embarked on an armed brigantine.” (Guérin 1861, p.241).) They made him embarque on an armed brigantine bound for commerce raiding at La Ciotat.

=== Corsaire ===
On the brigantine, his courage and drive coupled with his natural nautical talent quickly caused him to be famed for his exploits against the Barbary Pirates. During combat against the Turks, the captain was killed and he was chosen by the crew to replace him (Note: “The frequent combat that this warship delivered to the Mohamedians were as much an occasion for Paul to distinguish himself; he soon won a reputation of bravery and of cold-blood while in danger that none surpassed, not equaled even aboard a brigantine. The captain, having been killed, Paul, by the wishes of all the crew, was chosen to fill his place.” (Guérin 1861, p.241)).

From then on he declared war on the Turks. Wherever he could, he stole merchandise and even raided buildings within their ports. This considerably augmented Paul's reputation. On the isle of Moscovici near Lesbos, he installed artillery guns in a tower, which carries to this day the name of Captain Paulo, in order to cannonade the enemy warships which were within their range.

With a single small boat, he fought against five Turkish galleys, forcing them to retreat after having broken their masts and sails. (Note: It is from this moment that he was called “Chevalier Paul”.)

=== In the royal navy during the franco-spanish war (1635-1659) ===
Cardinal Richelieu at this time was searching for marine officers to reorganize the French royal navy. In 1638 Paul entered into the Royale with the rank of Capitaine de Vaisseau (captain) and took command of the vessel Le Neptune. He joined the squadron of Henry de Sourdis, Archbishop of Bordeaux and Lieutenant General of the naval armies, and took a leading role in many instances of combat against the Spanish fleet. Aboard La Licorne, he took part in the Battle of Getaria, 22 August 1638. Richelieu wrote to Paul on this occasion to congratulate him. The same year, together with Abraham Duquesne, Paul saved (under fire from the guns of San Sebastian) French ships which were run aground and were about to be burned. Also in 1638, he stole an Algerian ship in the Malta Canal, and was received at Malta by the Grand Master Giovanni Paolo Lascaris.

On 9 August 1643, he distinguished himself in naval battle off the coast of Cap de Gata, won by Brezé. On 4 September, he commanded Le Grand Anglois during the Battle of Cartagena, the siege of Roses, and at Tarragona in 1645, as well as at Salines and Santo-Stefano. In the squadron of the Marquis de Brézé on 22 May 1646, Paul led the disembarkation of Talamone in Tuscany and on 14 June was prominent in the Battle of Orbetello during which he destroyed two enemy frigates.

Paul was promoted to chef d’escadre, and was sent to the gulf of Piombino in 1647 at the head of five ships and two fire ships, in order to assure the communication between the posts of Porto-Longone on the isle of Elba and Piombino on the mainland which had been taken over by the Marshal of Meilleraie. At the beginning of April 1647, Paul fought near Naples for five days against the Spanish fleet, which was much stronger, (Note: The Spanish fleet counted six ships and ten galleys.) commanded by the Duke of Arcos, the Viceroy of Naples, and won a victory which grew his reputation further still. Chevalier Paul was also present on 22 December 1647 in a battle off the coast of Castellammare against an Austro-Spanish fleet.

In June 1648, he attacked and stole, under cannon fire of the city of Pozzoli, a ship full of grain sent by Genoa for the Viceroy of Naples. Some time after, accompanied by a knight of Perriere, he took two other ships filled with goods and sailed them to Porto-Longone.

At the start of 1649, he crossed near Malta an English ship which had 36 cannons on its way to Smyrne with important cargo. This ship refused to salute the French pavilion and so Chevalier Paul attacked and sank the ship. From the enemy crew only three or four men were saved, and the other 140 crew members perished by drowning. During the same campaign, Paul captured many other goods, which were estimated to be worth more than 300 000 écus (silver coins).

Having left from Provence in April 1650 on the Flagship La Reine, 52 canons and 600 crewmen and troops, Chevalier Paul was escorting some small warships filled with munitions when he discovered between Cap Corsica and the isle of Capraja five Spanish warships which had crossed in order to stop reinforcements, rations and munitions that France sent to Porto-Longone on the isle of Elba. Not wishing to flee this superior force, Paul engaged in combat and received more than 150 bullets on the side of his ship when at the same time he sent 1200 to his enemies. At the end of four hours of combat, the badly damaged Spanish-Napolitan fleet retreated.

On 21 January 1651 he was rewarded with a Cross of the Knight of Grace by Grand Master Lascaris. (Note: “The Grand-Master Lascaris made him a knight of justice in 1651, and La Religion sent him a cross worth a considerable price. Chevalier Paul, though from obscure birth, had a high reputation; he in turn made a present, to La Religion, of an armed vessel, that one estimates three or four million livres.” (Achard 1787, p.45).) (Note: He could not be named knight of justice being not noble but was made knight of grace by Grand-Master Lascaris.)

In 1654, he was promoted to lieutenant-general and vice-admiral of the Levant Fleet. The same year, he met the king. Paul, who had never mounted a horse before, was noted for his handling and manner with his horse at the time of the cavalcade given for the coronation of Louis XIV. Returning to Toulon, he took back to sea at the head of three ships and six galleys, and fought outside of Castellammare near Naples against fifteen enemy galleys, which he was forced to withdraw from. This largely individual action turned out to be decisive for the survival of the French contingent disembarking at Tuscany.

In 1655, he returned to the French court. The Duke of Vendome presented him to Louis XIV who gave Paul an honorable welcome, praising his bravery and congratulating him on his many victories. In the same year Paul was posted to Barcelona by the Duke of Vendome. One source on the combat noted that “Chevalier Paul showed on this occasion such valor and conduct, that we do not know how to dignifiedly speak of it.”

Chevalier Paul entered into the port of Malta with three French galleys, and there received honors from Grand Master Rafael Cotoner. In 1657, he commanded a squadron of seven ships, and flew for the first time the flag of vice-admiral. In June–July 1658, he was sent by the Duke of Mercoeur, governor of Provence, to block the port of Marseille.

In 1659, he received the charge of commander of the Order of Saint John of Jerusalem.

== Missions in the mediterranean (1660-1666) ==
In 1661, Paul fought using the lone vessel L’Hercule, which had 28 cannons and 320 crewmen, against 25 Turkish ships for an entire day. Despite being overwhelmed, Paul nevertheless managed to escape during the night. Chevalier Paul led the first relief force sent by Louis XIV to the Venetians who were under siege by the Turks at Candia. In 1662, he commanded a squadron of six ships and flew the flag of vice-admiral. In 1663, again on board L’Hercule, he had the Duke of Beaufort and many other members of the gentry under his command, many of whom voluntarily wished to follow Paul. On 12 May, he confronted 25 Tunisian corsaires. After fighting for an entire day, he escaped the enemy fleet via a ruse. During the night, he placed a lit lantern at the top of the mast of a ship that he left to drift in the wind, while at the same time taking a different route with his ship which had its lights extinguished.

The same year, a considerable fleet was sent against the corsaires of Algeria under the command of the Duke of Beaufort, Paul's father, who had become admiral due to the resignation of the Duke of Vendome. Chevalier Paul was the vice-admiral of this fleet which sank more than twenty Algerian warships, and led the admiral to the ports of France.

After having crossed the Barbary Pirates on the shores of Italy and Provence, Paul took part in the Duke of Beaufort's expedition against Jijel and on 24 August 1664 he crushed an Algerian squadron at the Battle of Cherchell. Finally, he fought under the fort of La Goulette, near Tunisia, and took three ships from the enemy fleet, burning two of them.

The last campaign of Chevalier Paul was when he sailed in 1666 accompanying Maria Francisca of Savoy to Lisbon, where she was to mary King Alphonso VI. He arrived at the mouth of the river Tagus in August 1666. The Portuguese monarch showered him with gifts and honors and visited him aboard his warship. Chevalier Paul, notified of the king's visit several hours beforehand, served him as well as his court a splendid meal. Afterwards, Paul returned to Toulon with the ships he commanded.

He commanded the fleet to Toulon until his death. Gout and several other illnesses stopped him from serving. He died 20 December 1667 or 16 October 1667. His death was described in these words: “Monsieur Paul de Saumeur, knight of Saint John of Jerusalem, lieutenant-general of the king’s ships, a man strongly renowned for the valiant exploits and faithful services he gave to his majesty, died on the 20th day of the month of December and was buried in the same month in 1667, in the cemetery under the porte of St Lazare of this city of Toulon, with the sacraments, by myself.” - Father Villecrosi, oratory priest, announced the news several days after his speech at the funeral in the Cathedral of Toulon.

Paul's soldiers, who loved and esteemed him, wrote this epitaph for him:

You who pass so vilely,
Look at this sepulcher,
And consider an adventure,
Worthy of your astonishment:
He who was born to fight,
He who lived in combat;
Water, fire, iron, could not kill him
A light fever killed him.

== Viewed by contemporaries ==
=== The courtisan ===
Louis XIV held Paul in high esteem and made him a noble. In 1660, while in Toulon, the king honored Paul by visiting him in his property “La Cassine”, in the company of his court. While present, the poets Chapelle and Bachaumont recorded what ensued during the royal visit.

=== The visit of Louis XIV to the property of Chevalier Paul ===
“We found at Toulon, Monsieur Chevalier Paul, who, by his office, by his merit and by his expense, is the first and most considerable of the country.

It’s this Paul, which the experience
Greedy of the Sea and Wind;
Which the happiness and valiance
Made France formidable
To all the people of the Levant.

These verses are as magnificent as his face; but, in truth, though it has something proud to it, does not fail to be convenient, soft and entirely honest. He served us in his home, which is so clean and well maintained, that it seemed to be a small delightful palace.”

The provincial biographer Claude-François Achard, described:

Chevalier Paul was quite tall, he had something dark about his face: his mustache and tuft of hair formed a type of Maltese cross. He was however more polite than was usual for sailors, and so gentle that he was never angered. He had a very soft voice, and spoke little. He treated soldiers with extreme kindness. Never was there a man so intrepid in danger, nor a captain who carried out his duties better.

== A generous man with the disinherited ==
Never forgetting his modest origins, he bequeathed to the poor the entirety of his belongings, and asked to be buried among them at the cemetery of Toulon. He enjoyed reminding people of this. The same Achard told the following anecdote:

One day he was passing through the port of Marseille with a brilliant and numerous procession of officers which formed his court, he noticed at some distance a sailor that he thought he recognised; approaching him, he said to him:

-”My friend, why do you flee? Do you think that fortune has made me forget my first acquaintances?”

Then he turned to those that followed him:

-”Monsieurs,” he said, “here is one of my old camarades; we were crewmates on the same vessel; fortune has been favorable to me, to him the contrary; I do not esteem him less, allow me to speak with him for a half hour”.

He sat down at his side, and spoke with him of the adventures of youth, enquired if he had children, recommended to him to go and wait at his hotel; the same day procured for him in the navy an employ which allowed him to honorably support his family.

== Honors and posterity ==
Three warships of the French navy have successively carried this prestigious name:

- Chevalier Paul (1934–1941), a vauquelin-class destroyer
- Chevalier Paul (D626) (1956–1971), an escorteur d’escadre type T 47
- Chevalier Paul (D621), a horizon-class frigate entered into service 10 June 2011

The center of the Préparation Militaire Marine in Marseille also carried the name Chevalier Paul.
