= French tanker Marne =

French Navy command and replenishment ship

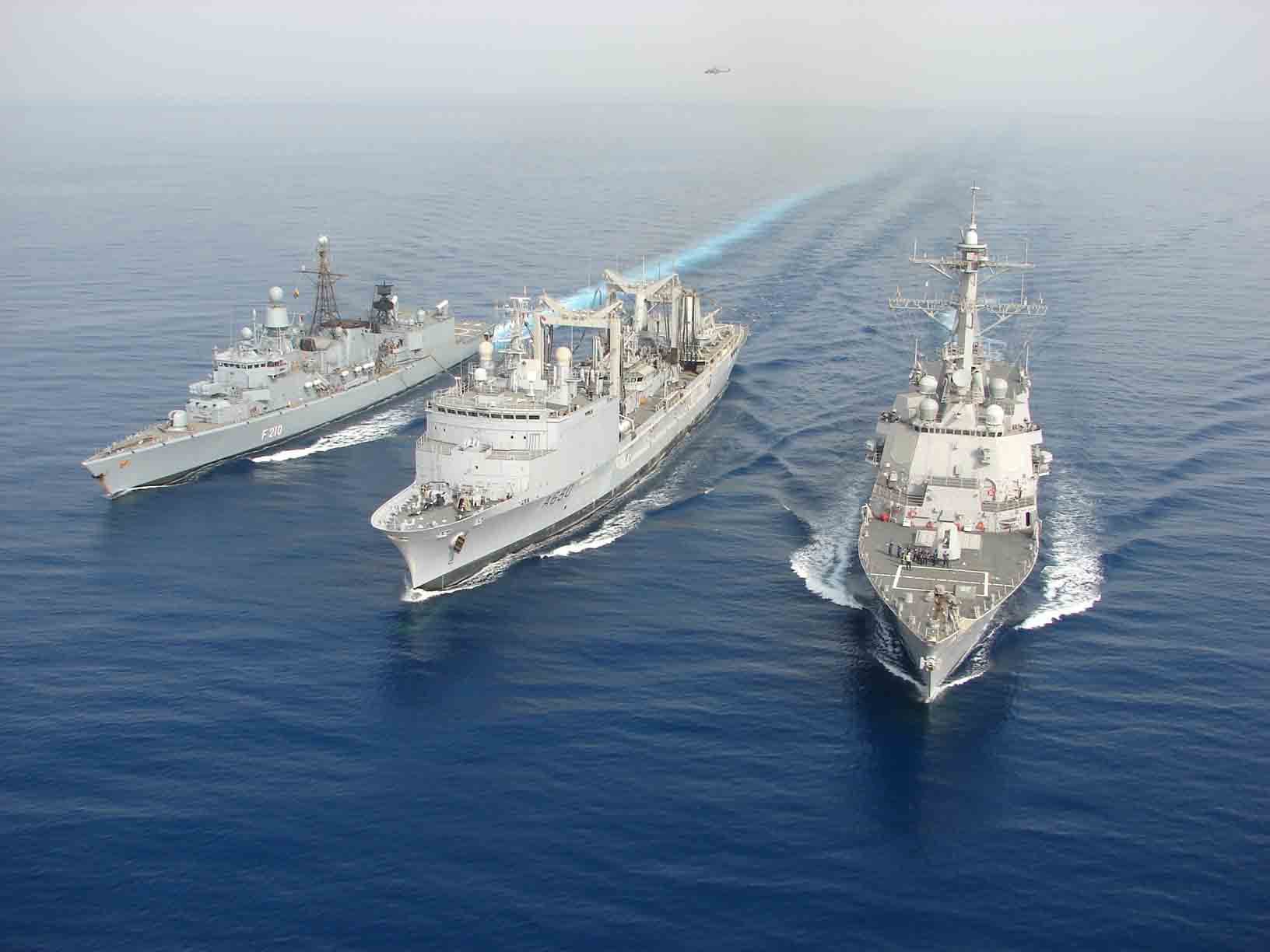
- Marne replenishes USS Shoup and the German frigate Emden on 4 December 2006

History

France
- Name: Marne
- Namesake: Marne
- Builder: Brest Arsenal, Brest
- Laid down: 4 August 1982
- Launched: 2 February 1985
- Commissioned: 16 January 1987
- Decommissioned: 20 October 2023
- Home port: Toulon
- Identification: MMSI number: 228782000; Callsign: FBMA; Pennant number: A 630
- Status: Decommissioned

General characteristics of French ships
- Type: Durance-class replenishment oiler and command ship
- Displacement: 7,900 t (7,800 long tons) standard; 18,800 t (18,500 long tons) (full load)
- Length: 157.2 m (515 ft 9 in)
- Beam: 21.2 m (69 ft 7 in)
- Draught: 8.65 m (28 ft 5 in) standard; 10.8 m (35 ft 5 in) full load
- Propulsion: 2 × SEMT Pielstick 16 PC2.5 V 400 diesel engines; 2 shafts, 15,000 kW (20,000 hp)
- Speed: 19 knots (35 km/h; 22 mph)
- Range: 9,000 nmi (17,000 km; 10,000 mi) at 15 knots (28 km/h; 17 mph)
- Complement: 162
- Sensors & processing systems: 2 x DRBN 34 radars
- Armament: 1 x Bofors 40 mm (1.6 in)/L60 gun; 4 x 12.7 mm (0.5 in) M2 Browning machine guns; 3 x Simbad Mistral missile launcher
- Aviation facilities: Medium helicopter pad

Marne was a Durance-class command and replenishment tanker (French: Bâtiment de commandement et de ravitaillement, BCR) of the French Navy. In addition to its primary duty as a fleet tanker, Marne was configured as a flagship and served as such in the Indian Ocean.

== Development and design ==
In French service, the final three Durance-class tankers are called Bâtiment de commandement et ravitailleur (BCR, "command and replenishment ship"). In addition to their role as a fleet tanker, the three ships dubbed BCR can accommodate an entire general staff and thus supervise naval operations as a command ship. The three ships of the class designated BCRs, Var, Marne and Somme all have superstructures that were extended aft by 8 m (26 ft) to accommodate the additional staff requirements. The BCRs have one crane positioned along the centreline.

Durance-class ships have a standard displacement of 7,900 t (7,800 long tons) and 18,800 t (18,500 long tons) at full load. The oiler is 157.3 metres (516 ft 1 in) long overall and 149 m (488 ft 10 in) between perpendiculars with a beam of 21.2 m (69 ft 7 in) and a draught of 8.65 m (28 ft 5 in) empty and 10.8 m (35 ft 5 in) at full load. Marne is powered by two SEMT Pielstick 16 PC2.5 V 400 diesel engines turning two LIPS controllable pitch propellers rated at 15,000 kilowatts (20,000 hp). The vessel has a maximum speed of 19 knots (35 km/h; 22 mph) and a range of 9,000 nautical miles (17,000 km; 10,000 mi) at 15 knots (28 km/h; 17 mph).

They have two dual solid/liquid underway transfer stations per side and can replenish two ships per side and one astern. The ship initially had capacity for 5,170 t (5,090 long tons) of fuel oil, 3,360 t (3,310 long tons) of diesel fuel, 1,160 t (1,140 long tons) of JP-5 aviation fuel, 250 t (250 long tons) of distilled water, 180 t (180 long tons) of provisions, 170 t (170 long tons) of munitions and 15 t (15 long tons) of spare parts. These numbers change with the needs of the fleet.

The Durance-class tankers all mount a flight deck over the stern and a hangar. The ships utilise Aérospatiale Alouette III and Westland Lynx helicopters but are capable of operating larger ones from their flight deck. For defence, Marne initially mounted one Bofors 40-millimetre (1.6 in)/L60 anti-aircraft (AA) gun in a single gun turret and two 20 mm (0.8 in) AA guns in a twin turret. The ship was equipped with two DRBN 34 navigational radars. The armament was later altered by removing the 20 mm guns and adding four 12.7 mm (0.5 in) M2 Browning machine guns and three launchers for Simbad Mistral surface-to-air missiles. The ship had a complement of 162 and was capable of accommodating 250 personnel.

== Construction and career ==
The fourth tanker of the Durance class was laid down on 4 August 1982 by Brest Arsenal at their yard in Brest, France. She was launched on 2 February 1985 and given the pennant number A 630. Marne was commissioned into the French Navy on 16 January 1987. The Durance-class ships were assigned to the Force d'action navale (FAR, "Naval Action Force") after entering service. One of the BCRs was assigned to Indian Ocean as flagship of the French naval forces in the region. In addition to its mission of logistical support for other ships, Marne like its sister ships Var and Somme could accommodate additional command staff of 45 people.

As of late 2021, only Marne and her sister ship Somme remained in service. The two ships were expected to be replaced by the new Jacques Chevallier-class vessels, with Marne's retirement anticipated in 2023. On 26 February 2023 Marne was said to have conducted her last at-sea replenishment of the aircraft carrier Charles de Gaulle. Her colours were lowered for the final time in October 2023, formally taking her out of service.

== Gallery ==
Marne, Jules Verne and Commandant Ducuing during Operation Desert Shield on 24 August 1990

Marne, Jules Verne and Commandant Ducuing during Operation Desert Shield on 24 August 1990

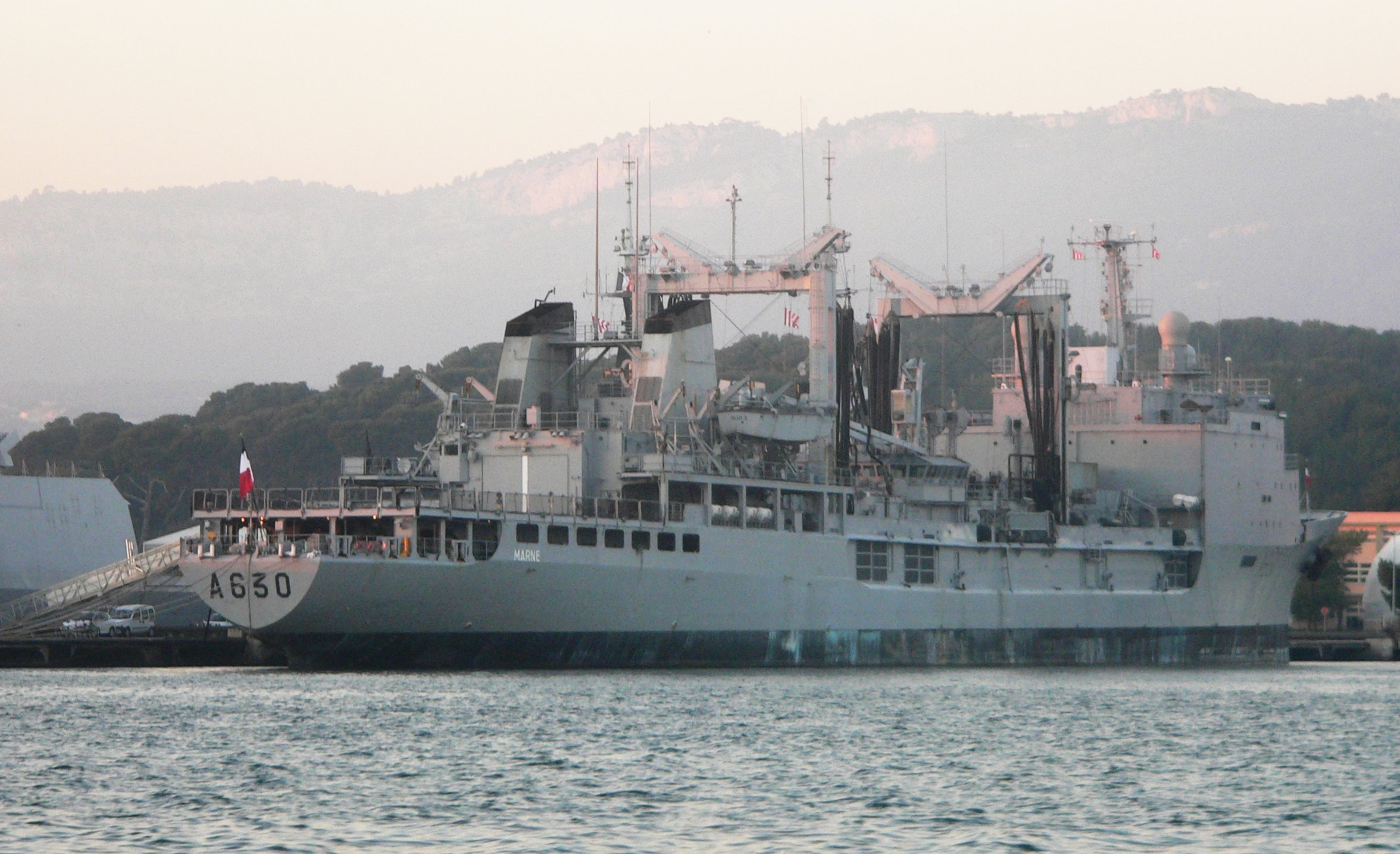
Marne on 28 December 2006

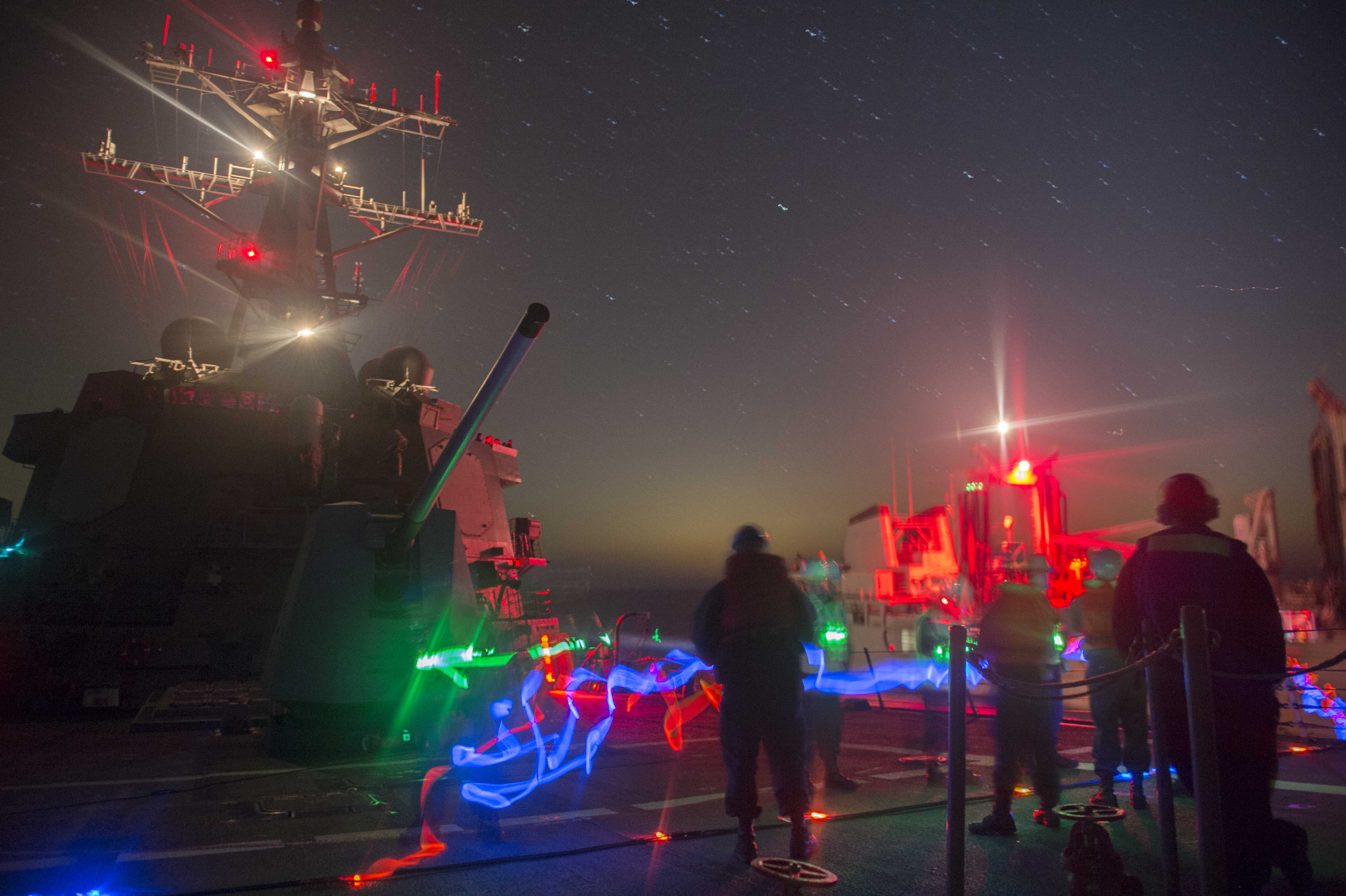
USS Bulkeley alongside Marne on 5 February 2016

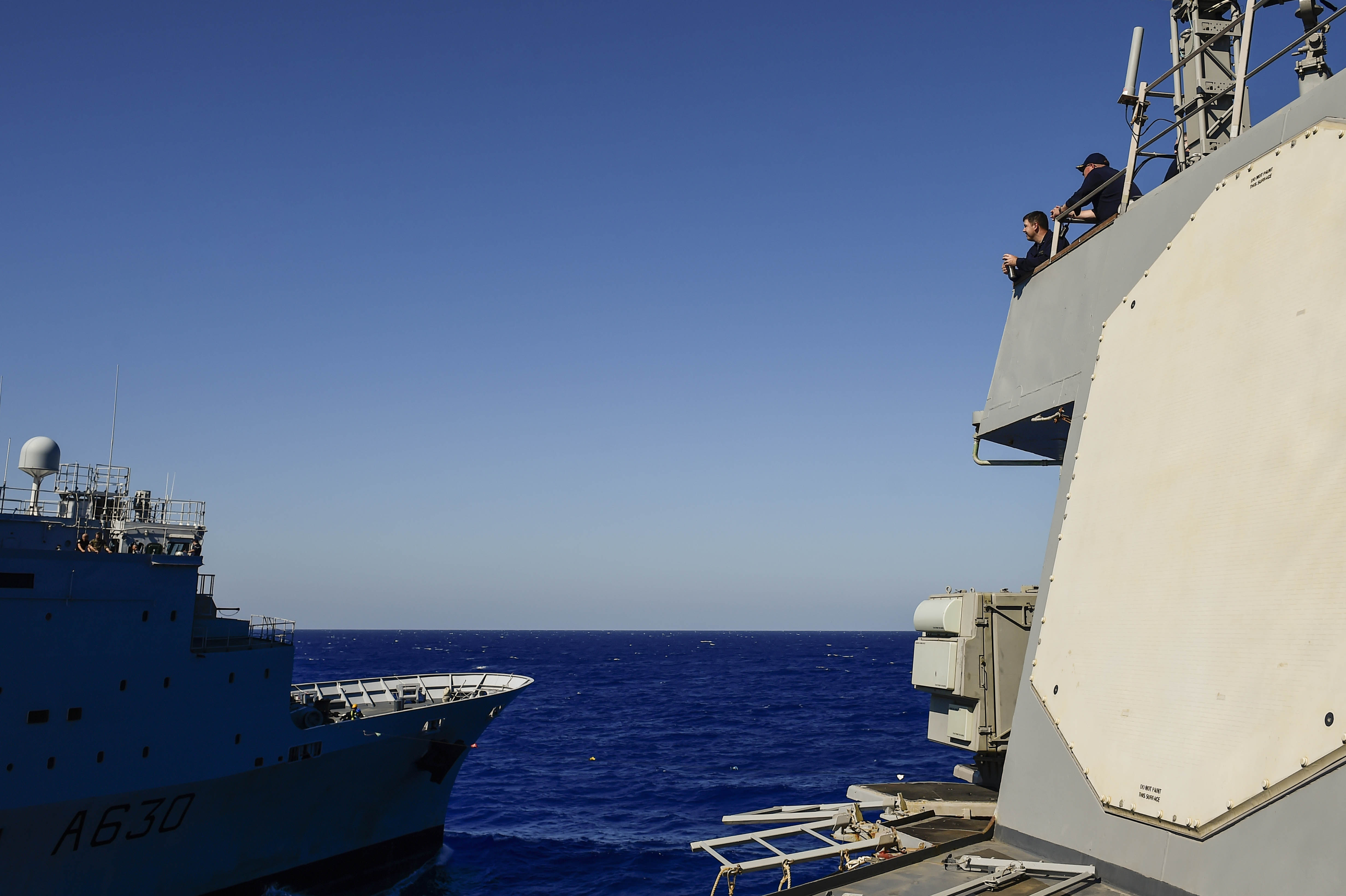
USS Ross alongside Marne on 16 October 2016
