= French ship Jules Verne (A620) =

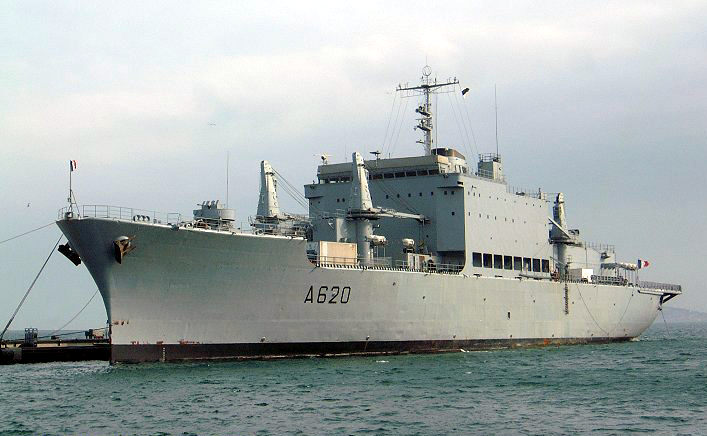
- Jules Verne moored at Toulon harbour in October 2001

History

France
- Name: Achéron
- Namesake: Acheron
- Ordered: 1961
- Builder: Brest
- Laid down: 1969
- Renamed: Jules Verne
- Namesake: Jules Verne
- Launched: 30 May 1970
- Commissioned: 17 September 1976
- Decommissioned: 17 September 2010
- Out of service: 20 February 2009
- Reclassified: to repair ship in 1973
- Homeport: Toulon
- Motto: Soutenir pour vaincre ("Support and overcome")
- Fate: Scrapped 2016

General characteristics
- Class & type: Unique auxiliary ship
- Displacement: 7,815 unloaded; 10,250 tonnes fully loaded
- Length: 151 m (495 ft)
- Beam: 21.56 m (70.7 ft)
- Draught: 6.50 m (21.3 ft)
- Propulsion: 2 Pielstick 12PC2V400 engines; One shaft; 12,000 shp (8,900 kW)
- Speed: 19 knots (35 km/h; 22 mph)
- Range: 9,385 nmi (17,381 km; 10,800 mi) at 18 knots (33 km/h; 21 mph)
- Boats & landing craft carried: On 9-metre VD9 boat; Two LCVP; One Dory 17; One 3.5-metre boat; One two-part hulk; Two Rigid-hulled inflatable boats (6 and 10 seats)
- Capacity: 300 tonnes of ammunition, 500 tonnes of matériel, 1000 tonnes of oil, 120 m3 of kerosene, 400m3 of water, 40 days worth of food for 300 men.
- Complement: 16 officers; 148 non-commissioned officers; 103 quarter-masters and sailors
- Armament: 2 Bofors 40 mm guns; 4 12.7mm M2 Browning machine guns

Jules Verne was a repair ship of the French Navy, named in honour of science-fiction writer Jules Verne.

Originally named Achéron and intended as an ammunition transport ship, she was converted to repair ship after her keel had been laid.

Jules Verne was long based in Djibouti (she was featured on the 10 000-Djiboutian francs banknote). In 1997, she was assigned to the Force d'Action Navale.

She was designed to replenish, refuel and repair the ships of an operational force at sea. She was fitted with a complete 240-m2 hospital including an operating theatre, a recompression chamber and 16 beds.

In May 2016 Jules Verne arrived at Ghent, Belgium for recycling by Galloo Group.
